= List of non-marine molluscs of Guadeloupe =

Location of Guadeloupe

The non-marine molluscs of Guadeloupe are a part of the molluscan fauna of Guadeloupe (wildlife of Guadeloupe). Guadeloupe is a Caribbean island in the Lesser Antilles. A number of species of non-marine molluscs are found in the wild in Guadeloupe.

== Freshwater gastropods ==
Ampullariidae

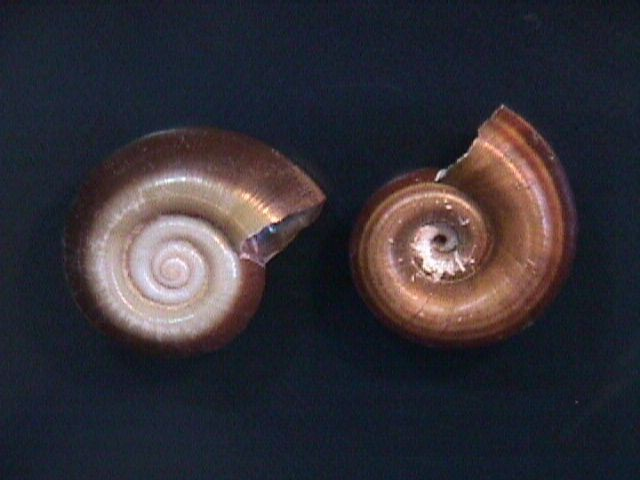
Marisa cornuarietis

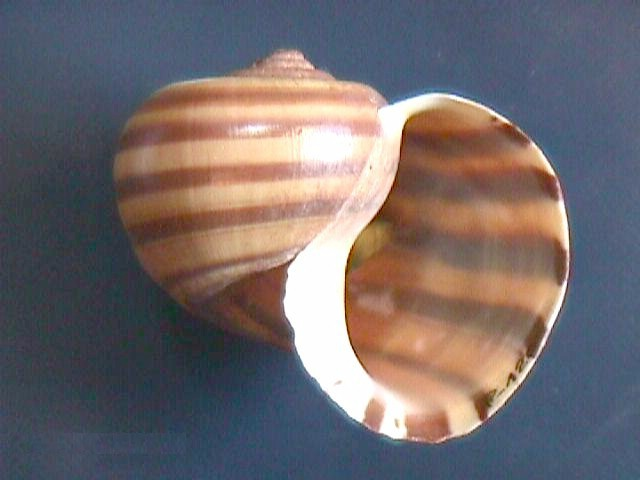
Pomacea glauca

- Marisa cornuarietis (Linnaeus, 1758)
- Pomacea glauca (Linnaeus, 1758)

Ancylidae

- Gundlachia radiata (Guilding, 1828)

Bulinidae

- Plesiophysa granulata (Shuttleworth in Sowerby, 1873)
- Plesiophysa guadeloupensis ("Fischer" Mazé, 1883)

Hydrobiidae

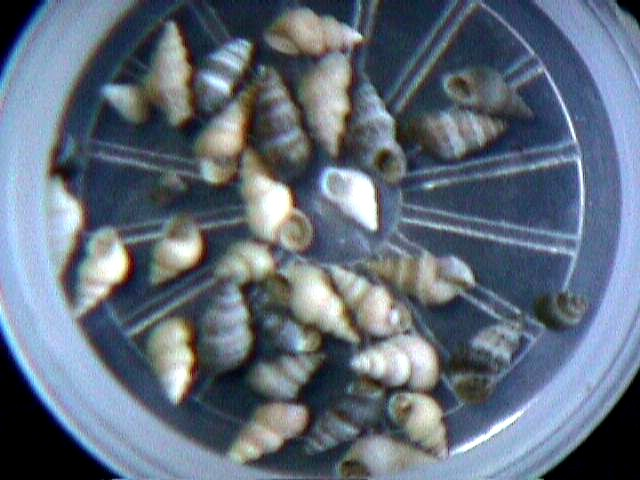
Potamopyrgus coronatus

- Potamopyrgus coronatus (Pfeiffer, 1840)
- Pyrgophorus parvulus (Guilding, 1828)

Lymnaeidae

- Lymnaea cubensis Pfeiffer, 1839

Neritidae

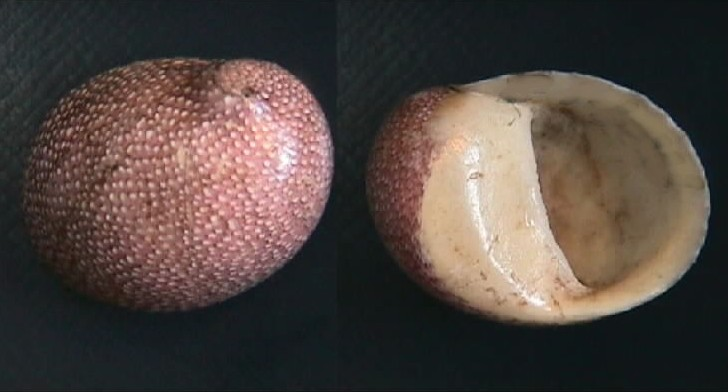
Neritina punctulata

- Neritina punctulata Lamarck, 1816
- Neritina succinea Recluz, 1841
- Neritina virginea (Linnaeus, 1758)

Planorbidae

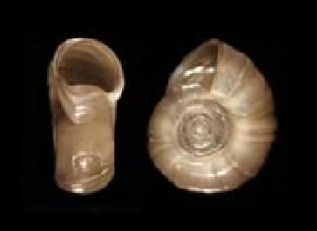
Helisoma duryi

- Biomphalaria glabrata (Say, 1818)
- Biomphalaria schrammi (Crosse, 1864)
- Biomphalaria straminea (Dunker, 1848)
- Drepanotrema aeruginosum (Morelet, 1851)
- Drepanotrema anatinum (d´Orbigny, 1835)
- Drepanotrema cimex (Monicand, 1837)
- Drepanotrema depressissimum (Moricand, 1839)
- Drepanotrema kermatoides (d´Orbigny, 1835)
- Drepanotrema lucidum (Pfeiffer, 1839)
- Gundlachia radiata (Guilding, 1828)
- Helisoma duryi (Wethrby, 1879)
- Helisoma foveale (Menke, 1830)
- Plesiophysa granulata (Shuttleworth in Sowerby, 1873)
- Plesiophysa guadeloupensis ("Fischer" Mazé, 1883)

Physidae

- Aplexa marmorata Guilding, 1828
- Physa cubensis Pfeiffer, 1839

Thiaridae

- Melanoides tuberculata (Müller, 1774)

== Land gastropods ==
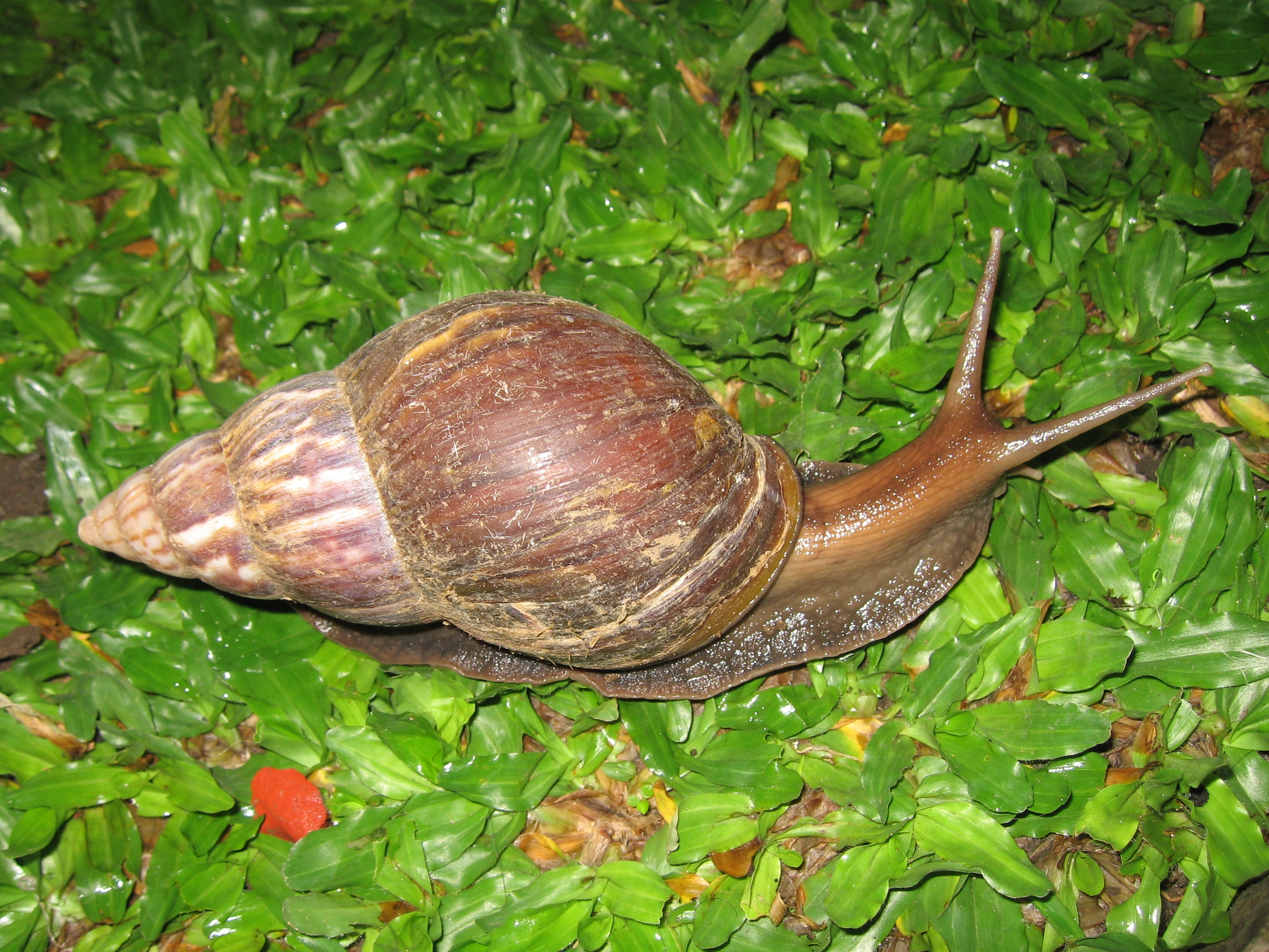
Achatina fulica

Achatinidae

- Achatina fulica Bowdich, 1822

Annulariidae

- Chondropoma crenulatum (Potiez & Michaud, 1838)
- Chondropoma julieni Pfeiffer, 1866

Amphibulimidae

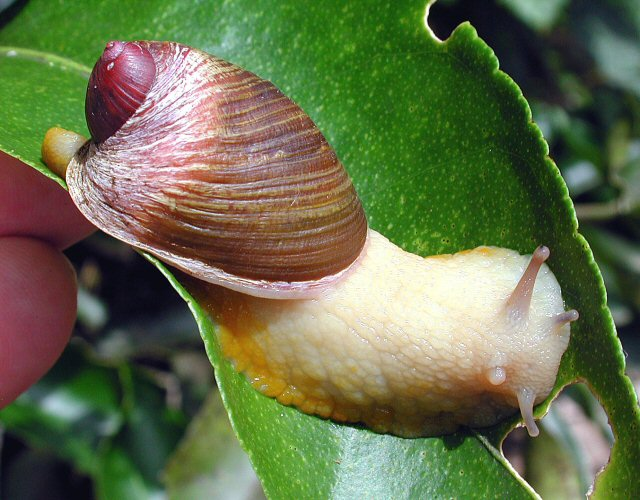
Amphibulima patula

- Amphibulima patula (Bruguière, 1789)
- Amphibulima rubescens (Deshayes, 1830)

Bulimulidae

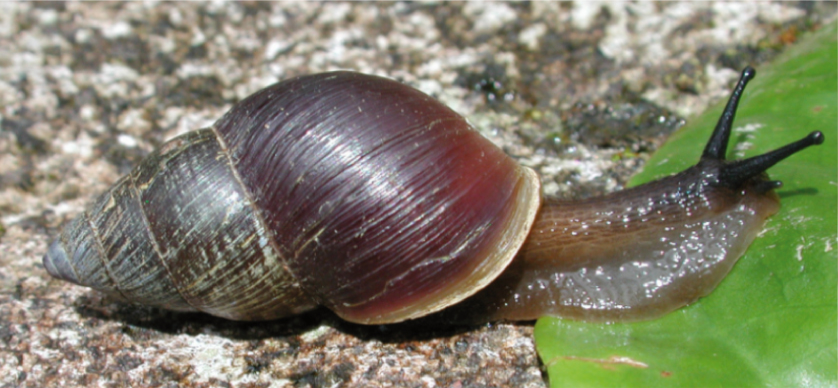
Bulimulus limnoides

- Bulimulus diaphanus (Pfeiffer, 1855)
- Bulimulus cf. eyriesii (Drouët, 1859)
- Bulimulus guadalupensis (Bruguière, 1789)
- Bulimulus iherminieri (Fischer, 1857)
- Bulimulus limnoides (Férussac, 1832)
- Drymaeus elongatus (Röding, 1798)
- Drymaeus multifasciatus (Lamarck, 1822)
- Naesiotus chrysalis (Pfeiffer, 1847)
- Pellicula depressa Rang, 1853

Euconulidae

- Guppya gunddlachi (Pfeiffer, 1840)

Ferussaciidae

- Geostilbia consobrina (d´Orbigny, 1845)
- Geostilbia gundlachi Pfeiffer, 1850

Gastrodontidae

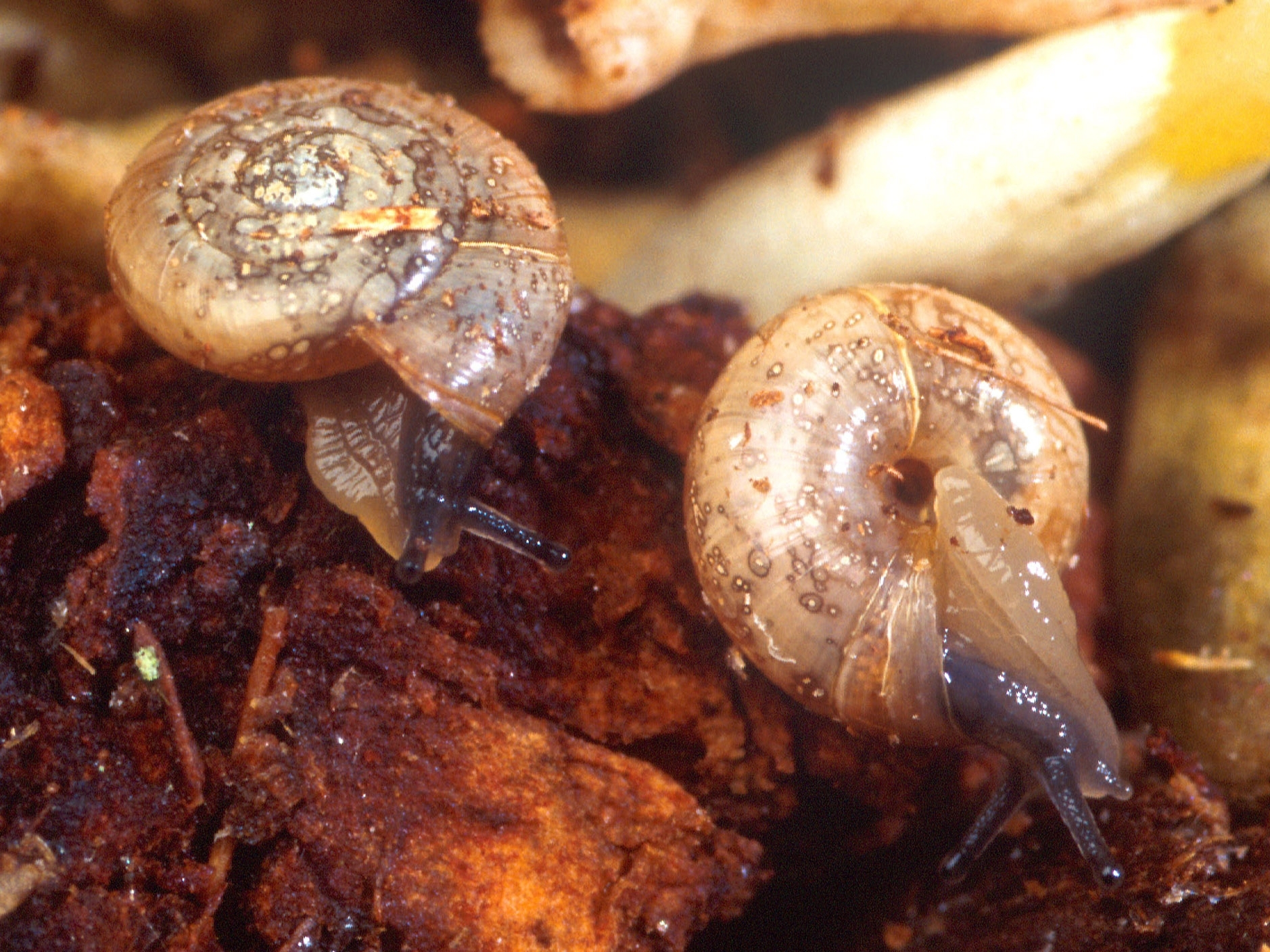
Zonitoides arboreus

- Zonitoides arboreus (say, 1816)

Helicinidae

- Alcadia guadaloupensis (Sowerby, 1842)
- Alcadia schrammi (Crosse, 1872)
- Helicina convexa Pfeiffer, 1848
- Helicina fasciata Lamarck, 1822
- Lucidella plicatula (Pfeiffer, 1848)

Hydrocenidae

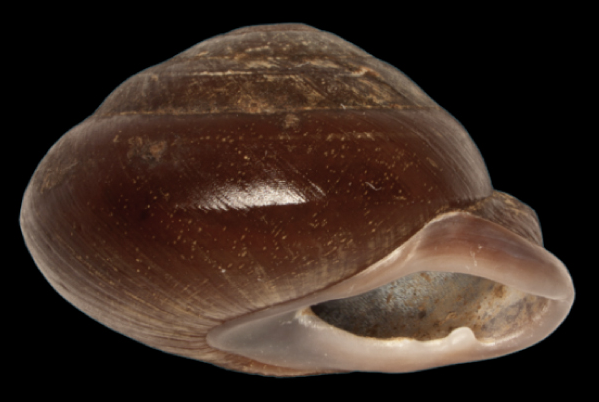
Pleurodonte dentiens

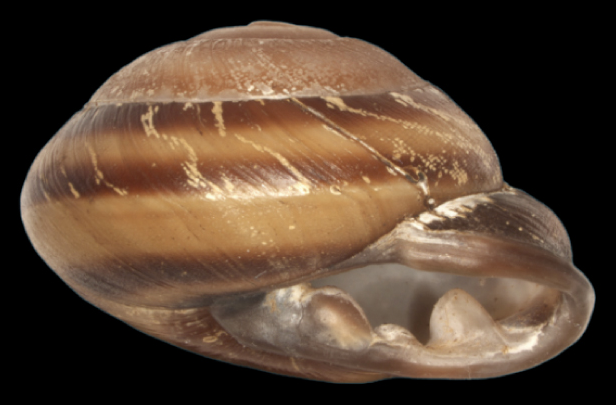
Pleurodonte josephinae

- Hydrocena dubiosa (C.B. Adams, 1851)

Neocyclotidae = (Poteridae)

- Amphicyclotulus beauianus (Petit, 1853)
- Amphicyclotulus guadeloupensis de la Torre, Bartsch & Morrison, 1942
- Amphicyclotulus perplexus de la Torre, Bartsch & Morrison, 1942
- Amphicyclotulus schrammi (Shuttleworth, 1857)

Oleacinidae

- Lavadicella guadeloupensis (Pfeiffer, 1856) - endemic, extinct

Pleurodontidae

- Pleurodonte dentiens (Férussac, 1822)
- Pleurodonte josephinae (Férussac, 1832)
- Pleurodonte lychnuchus (Müller, 1774)
- Pleurodonte orbiculata (Férussac, 1822)
- Pleurodonte pachygastra (Gray, 1834)

Pupillidae

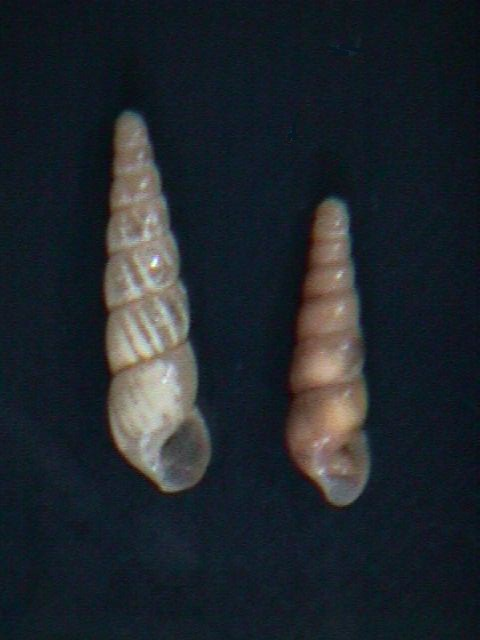
Subulina octona

- Pupoides marginatus (Say, 1821)

Subulinidae

- Beckianum beckianum (Pfeiffer, 1849)
- Lamellaxis micra (Houton, 1834)
- Leptinaria lamellata (Potiez & Michaud, 1838)
- Obeliscus swiftianus (Pfeiffer, 1852)
- Opeas pumilum (Pfeiffer, 1840)
- Subulina octona (Bruguière, 1789)

Succineidae

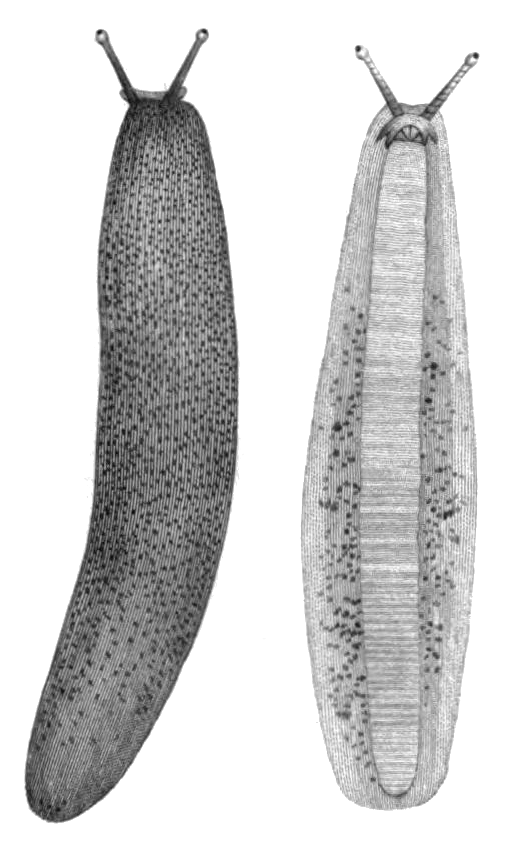
Vaginula occidentalis

- Succinea approximans Shuttleworth, 1854
- Succinea candeana Lea, 1841
- Omalonyx matheronii (Potiez & Michaud, 1838)

Systrophiidae

- Moerchia baudoni (Petit, 1853)

Truncatellidae

- Truncatella bilabiata Pfeiffer, 1840

Thysanophoridae

- Thysanophora vortex (Pfeiffer, 1839)

Urocoptidae

- Brachypodella collaris (Férussac, 1821)
- Pseudopineria viequensis (Pfeiffer, 1856)

Veronicellidae

- Vaginula occidentalis (Guilding, 1824)
- Sarasinula marginata (Semper, 1885)

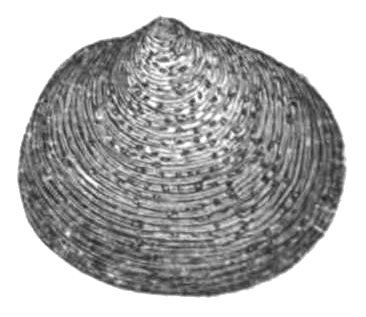
Pisidium punctiferum

Vertiginidae

- Gastrocopta servilis (Gould, 1843)
- Vertigo ovata Say, 1822

== Bivalvia ==
Sphaeriidae

- Eupera viridans (Prime 1875)
- Pisidium punctiferum (Guppy, 1867)

== See also ==
- List of marine molluscs of Guadeloupe

Lists of molluscs of surrounding countries:

- List of non-marine molluscs of Dominica
- List of non-marine molluscs of Antigua and Barbuda, Wildlife of Antigua and Barbuda
- List of non-marine molluscs of Montserrat, Wildlife of Montserrat
