= List of non-marine molluscs of Martinique =

Location of Martinique in the Caribbean

The non-marine molluscs of Martinique are a part of the molluscan fauna of Martinique (wildlife of Martinique). Martinique is a Caribbean island in the Lesser Antilles. A number of species of non-marine molluscs are found in the wild in Martinique.

There are at least 88 species of gastropods (10 native freshwater gastropods and 7 species of introduced freshwater gastropods, 60 species of land gastropods) and 3 species of freshwater bivalve living in the wild.

== Freshwater gastropods ==
Neritinidae

- Neritilia succinea (Récluz, 1841)
- Neritina punctulata Lamarck, 1816
- Neritina virginea (Linnaeus 1758)

Ampullariidae

- Marisa cornuarietis (Linnaeus, 1758) - introduced
- Pomacea glauca (Linnaeus, 1758)

Thiaridae

- Melanoides tuberculata (O. F. Müller, 1774) - introduced since 1980's

(Melanoides amabilis is reported as a second invasive Melanoides species, but not mentioned in more recent check lists)

- Tarebia granifera (Lamarck, 1822) - introduced since 1991

Cochliopidae

- Pyrgophorus parvulus (Guilding, 1828)

Lymnaeidae

- Galba cubensis (Pfeiffer, 1839)

Planorbidae

- Amerianna carinata (H. Adams, 1861) - introduced
- Biomphalaria glabrata (Say, 1818) - extinct on Martinique
- Biomphalaria kuhniana (Clessin, 1883) - introduced
- Biomphalaria schrammi (Crosse, 1864) - extinct on Martinique

(Biomphalaria straminea is reported as a second invasive Biomphalaria species, but not mentioned in more recent check lists)

- Drepanotrema cimex (Moricand, 1837)
- Drepanotrema surinamense (Clessin, 1884)

(Drepanotrema aeruginosum (Morelet, 1851) and Drepanotrema depressisimum (Moricand, 1839) were reported in the 1950's, but not found in recent years

- Gundlachia radiata (Guilding, 1828)
- Gyraulus chinensis (Dunker, 1848) - introduced
- Helisoma duryi (Wetherby, 1879) - introduced

Physidae

- Aplexa marmorata (Guilding, 1828)
- Physa acuta Draparnaud, 1805 - introduced

== Land gastropods ==
Helicinidae

- Helicina antillarum G.B. Sowerby II, 1842
- Helicina fasciata Lamarck, 1822
  - Helicina fasciata fasciata Lamarck, 1822
  - Helicina fasciala picturata Mazé, 1874 - endemic to Martinique
- Helicina guadeloupensis G.B. Sowerby 11, 1842
- Helicina platychila (Megerle von Mühlfeld, 1824)
- Helicina pudica Drouël, 1859 - not re-collected since the 19th century
- Helicina sp. 1 - probably endemic to Martinique
- Helicina sp. 2 - probably endemic to Martinique
- Lucidella striatula (Férussac, 1827)

Neocyclotidae

- Amphicyclotulus cinereus (Drouët, 1859) - endemic to Martinique, now globally extinct
- Amphicyclotulus martinicensis (Shuttleworth, 1857) - endemic to Martinique
- Amphicyclotulus rufescens (G. B. Sowerby I, 1843) - endemic to Martinique

Annulariidae

- Diplopoma crenulatum (Potiez & Michaud, 1836)

Veronicellidae

- Diplosolenodes occidentalis (Guilding, 1825) - probably introduced
- Sarasinula plebeia (P. Fischer, 1868) - introduced
- Semperula wallacei (Issel, 1874) - introduced

(Several additional veronicellid species may have introduced to Martinique)

Succineidae

- Omalonyx matheronii (Potiez & Michaud, 1835) - introduced
- Succinea cf. cuvierii Guilding, 1026

Valloniidae

- Pupisoma dioscoricola (C.B. Adams, 1845) - introduced

Gastrocoptidae

- Gastrocopta barbadensis (L. Pfeiffer, 1852)

Amphibulimidae

- Amphibulima rubescens (Deshayes, 1830) - endemic to Martinique

Bulimulidae

- Bulimulus guadalupensis (Bruguière, 1789) - introduced in the 19th century, probably extinct
- Drymaeus multifasciatus (Lamarck, 1822) - endemic to Martinique
- Protoglyptus chrysalis (L. Pfeiffer, 1847)
- Protoglyptus luciae (Pilsbry, 1897)
- Protoglyptus martinicensis (L. Pfeiffer, 1846) - endemic to Martinique
- Protoglyptus mazei (Crosse, 1874) - endemic to Martinique

Urocoptidae

- Brachypodella antiperversa (Férussac,"1832)

Achatinidae

- Allopeas clavulinum (Potiez & Michaud, 1838) - introduced
- Allopeas gracile (Hutton, 1834) - introduced
- Allopeas micra (d'Orbigny, 1835) - introduced
- Archachatina marginata (Swainson, 1821) - introduced
- Beckianum beckianum (L. Pfeiffer, 1846) - introduced
- Lissachatina fulica (Bowdich, 1822) - introduced
- Leptinaria lamellata (Potiez & Michaud,1835) - introduced
- Limicolaria aurora (Jay, 1839) - introduced
- Opeas hannense (Rang, 1831) - introduced
- Pseudopeas sp. - probably introduced
- Stenogyra sp. - probably introduced
- Subulina octona (Bruguière, 1789) - introduced

Ferussaciidae

- Karolus consobrinus (d'Orbigny, 1841)

Oleacinidae

- Laevaricella semitarum (L. Pfeiffer, 1842) - endemic to Martinique
- Laevaricella sp. - endemic to Martinique

Streptaxidae

- Huttonella bicolor (Hutton, 1834) - introduced
- Streptartemon glaber (L. Pfeiffer, 1849) - introduced
- Streptostele musaecola (Morelet, 1860) - introduced

Scolodontidae

- Tamayoa decolorata (Drouët, 1859) - introduced

Sagdidae

- Lacteoluna selenina (A.A. Gould, 1848) - could be introduced

Agriolimacidae

- Deroceras laeve (O. F. Müller, 1774) - introduced

Philomycidae

- Pallifera sp. - introduced

Pleurodontidae

- Discolepis desidens (Rang, 1834) - endemic to Martinique
- Gonostomopsis auridens (Rang, 1834) - endemic to Martinique
- Pleurodonte dentiens (Férussac, 1822)
- Pleurodonte discolor (Férussac, 1821) - endemic to Martinique
- Pleurodonte guadeloupensis roseolabrum (M. Smith, 1911) - endemic to Martinique
- Pleurodonte hippocastanum (Lamarck, 1792) - endemic to Martinique
- Pleurodonte nucleola (Rang, 1834) - endemic to Martinique
- Pleurodonte obesa (Beck, 1837) - endemic to Martinique
- Pleurodonte orbiculata (Férussac, 1822)
- Pteurodonte paritis (Férussac, 1822) - endemic to Martinique

Polygyridae

- Praticolella griseola (L. Pfeiffer, 1841) - could be introduced

Thysanophoridae

- Thysanophora vortex bracteola (Férussac & Deshayes, 1850)

== Freshwater bivalves ==
Dreissenidae

- Mytilopsis leucophaeata (Conrad, 1831) - introduced

Sphaeriidae

- Eupera viridans (Prime, 18651)
- Pisidium punctiferum (Guppy, 1867)

== See also ==
- List of marine molluscs of Martinique

Lists of molluscs of surrounding countries:

- List of non-marine molluscs of Dominica, Wildlife of Dominica
- List of non-marine molluscs of Saint Lucia, Wildlife of Saint Lucia
- List of non-marine molluscs of Barbados, Wildlife of Barbados
