= List of non-marine molluscs of Dominica =

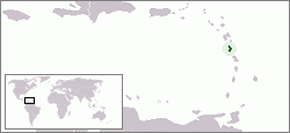
Location of Dominica in the Caribbean

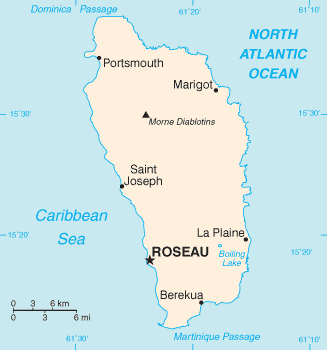
An outline map of Dominica

The non-marine molluscs of Dominica are species of land and freshwater molluscs, i.e. land snails, land slugs and one small freshwater clam that are part of the wildlife of Dominica, an island in the Lesser Antilles. In malacology, the non-marine molluscs of an area are traditionally listed separately from the marine molluscs (those molluscs that live in full-salinity saltwater).

Dominica is a Caribbean island, part of the Windward Island chain of the Lesser Antilles. Fifty-five species of non-marine molluscs have been found in the wild in Dominica, including sixteen endemic species of land snails, species which occur nowhere else on Earth.

Dominica is a mountainous, 750 square kilometres (290 mi^{2}), volcanic, tropical island. It is undeveloped compared with most other Caribbean islands, and it is known for its wildlife and unspoiled natural landscapes. The rugged terrain includes a great deal of tropical rainforest, numerous rivers, and several officially protected areas, including Morne Trois Pitons National Park and Cabrits National Park. The rich natural landscapes of Dominica provide suitable habitat for a wide range of different species of wildlife, including many rarities, and a relatively large number of species of non-marine molluscs, both native and introduced.

Living in the wild in Dominica there are 54 species of gastropods, (11 species of freshwater gastropods including 2 neritids that live in brackish water, 43 species of land gastropods) and 1 species of freshwater bivalve.

Summary table of number of species:
Numbers of molluscs by habitat	Number of species
Freshwater gastropods	11 (7 + 4)
Land gastropods	43 (42 + 1)
Total number of non-marine gastropods	54
Freshwater bivalves	1
Total number of non-marine molluscs	55

== History of surveys of land gastropods ==
The first records of land gastropods from Dominica were published by the English naturalist Robert John Lechmere Guppy in 1868. During his visit (a vacation which he turned into an active malacological field trip) Guppy collected a total of 20 species from Dominica. Out of these twenty, he described 9 as new species.

Subsequently, additional records were added by Thomas B. Bland (1869), A. D. Brown (1881), George French Angas (1884), Edgar Albert Smith (1888, 1888) and Henry Augustus Pilsbry (1892). Four surveys of the terrestrial malacofauna were carried out in the 2000s: 2001 (Ramnath), 2003, 2005 (Robinson, Fields & Zimmerman) and 2008 (Hovestadt). These studies were summarized in 2009.

== Land gastropods overview ==
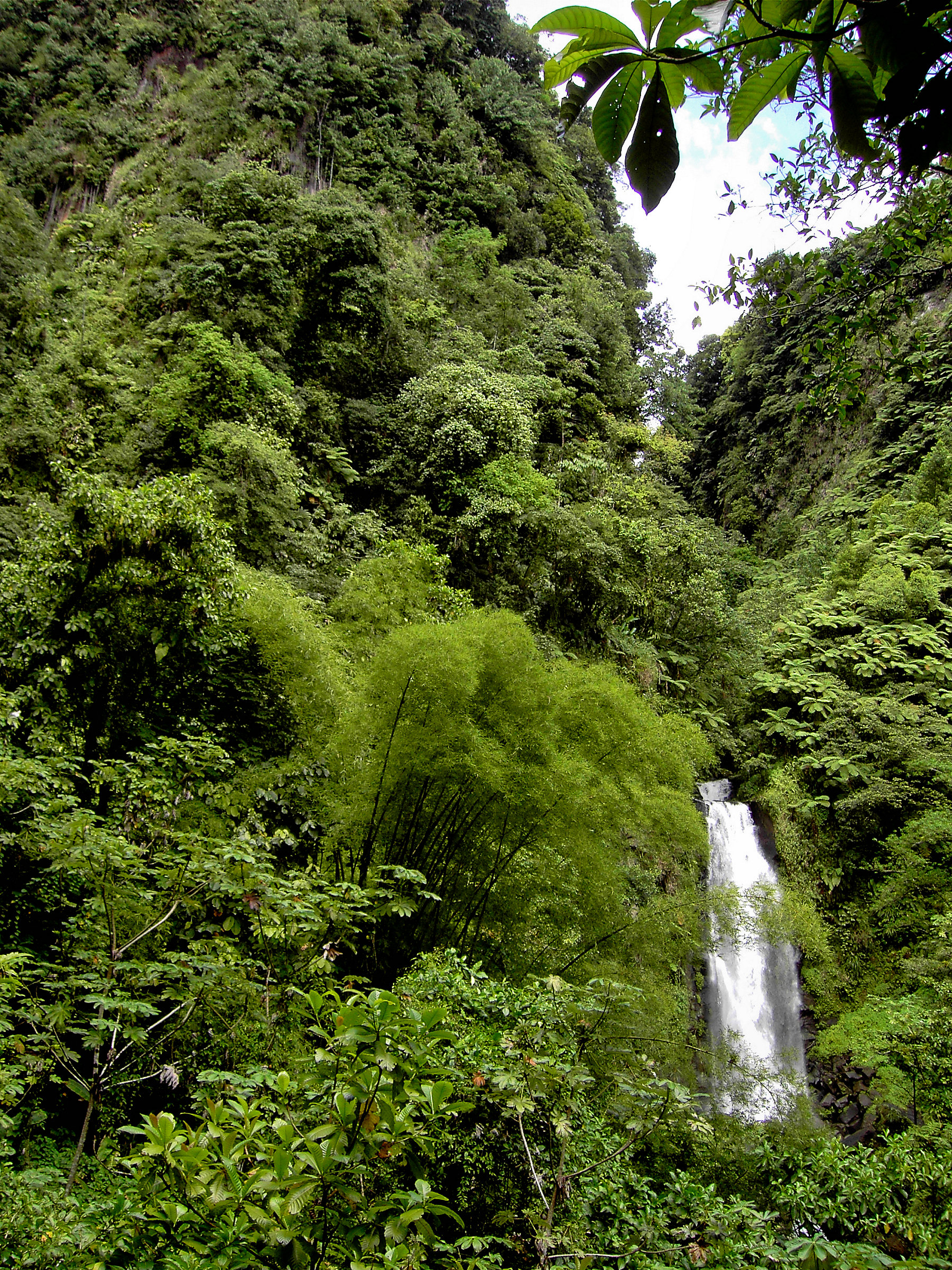
Rainforest habitats in Morne Trois Pitons National Park have a high biodiversity of land gastropods and other organisms.

The list of Dominican land gastropods contains 43 species, making it one of the richest known faunas of land snails and slugs in the Lesser Antilles.

Of these, 16 species (38%) are endemic to the island. The endemic species of Dominican gastropods are mainly found on the leeward (or Caribbean Sea) side of the island. Amphibulima pardalina, Diplopoma sp., Laevaricella perlucens, Naesiotus stenogyroides and Veronicella sp. are very restricted in range, and probably meet the IUCN-criteria for Critically Endangered species. Amphibulima browni and Lucidella sp. are likely to meet the criteria for being listed as endangered species.

There are striking faunal relationships with the islands of Guadeloupe and Martinique. Furthermore, 9 of the species (21%) are widespread, and 13 species are considered to have been introduced into Dominica.

The landsnail fauna can be analyzed according to the elevational range of the species. There is a distinction between the windward (east) and leeward (west) side of the island, according to the parishes in which the localities are situated. While most species exhibit a rather wide elevational range, several are restricted in this respect. Very few species only occur at lower elevations: Diplopoma, Allopeas, Beckianum and Huttonella species. These taxa are largely introduced species. Some species are restricted to higher localities: Lucidella sp., veronicellids (except the introduced Veronicella cubensis and Veronicella sloanei), Naesiotus stenogyroides, Amphibulima pardalina and Laevaricella perlucens. These do not occur, however, on the upper slopes of the higher peaks, but seem to be restricted to the hygrophytic vegetation zone, i.e. the cloud forest.

Many localities have a rather low species richness. For example, in surveys from 2001–2008, at six localities no snails were encountered; at the remaining 64, species richness ranged from 1 to 17 (mean 4.54). Taking into account the rareness of species, the southeast of the island scores well when the total diversity is considered.

The area of Freshwater Lake in Morne Trois Pitons National Park is a biodiversity hotspot for land snails. However, several other localities situated in the national parks are also important areas for the occurrence of endemic species: the Syndicate Parrot Preserve and the Lake Boeri area. These national parks lie on the leeward side of the island at relatively high elevations (above 600 m).

== Freshwater gastropods ==
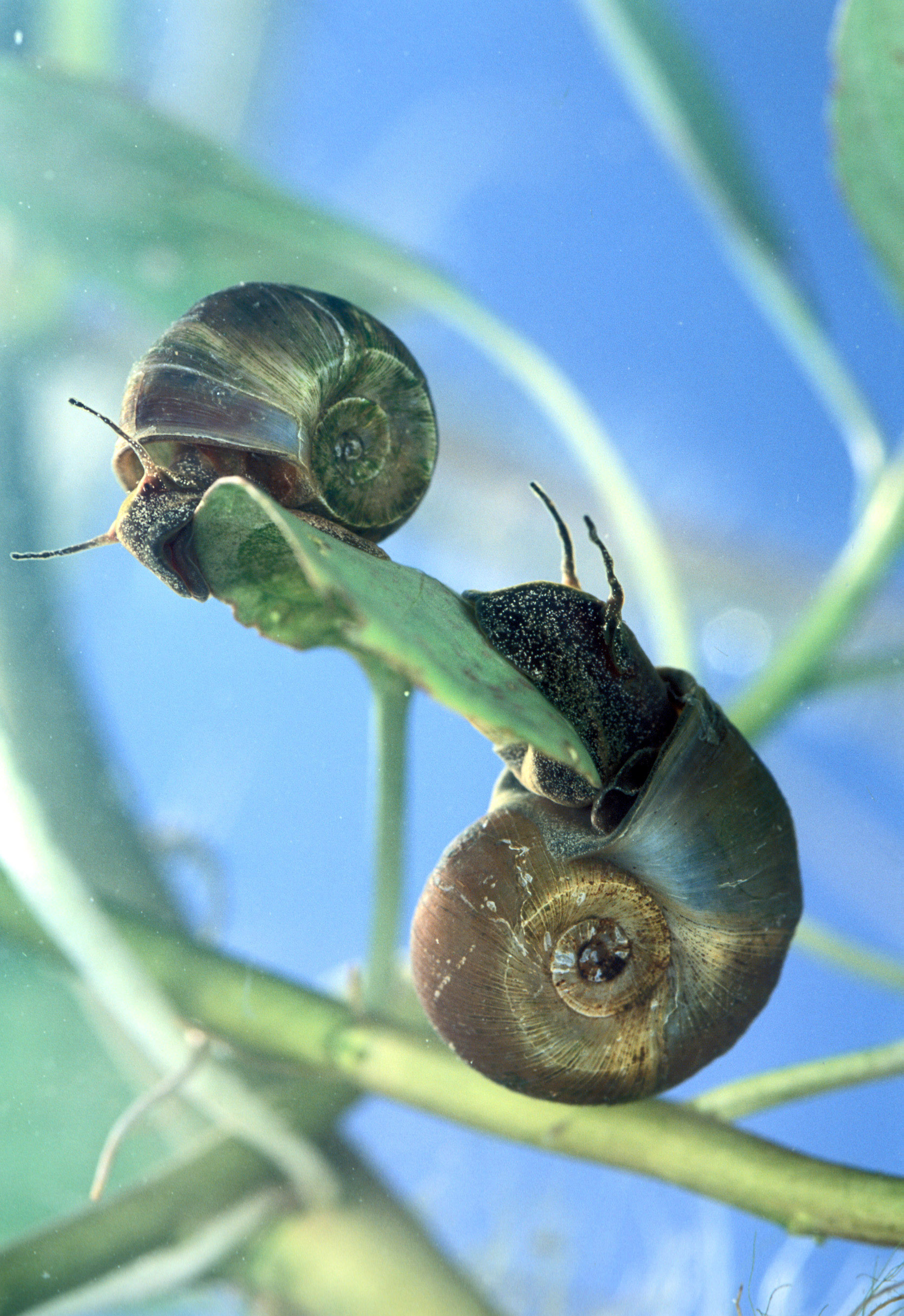
Helisoma trivolvis is an introduced species in Dominica.

The systematic list uses scientific names including the authority, and is arranged according to families:

Neritidae

- Neritina punctulata (Lamarck, 1816) – Native.
- Neritina virginea (Linnaeus, 1758) – In brackish water.
- Puperita pupa (Linnaeus, 1758) – In brackish water.

Planorbidae

- Biomphalaria glabrata (Say, 1818) – This species was reported from Dominica in 1980, but it seems that it was replaced by other Biomphalaria species, or it was eradicated (it was not found by Noblet & Damian (1991) nor by Reeves et al. (2008)).
- Biomphalaria kuhniana (Clessin, 1883) – Previous reports of Biomphalaria straminea were probably Biomphalaria kuhniana.
- Gundlachia radiata (Guilding, 1828) – First recorded in 2008.
- Helisoma trivolvis (Say, 1817) – Introduced.

Thiaridae

- Melanoides tuberculata (Müller, 1774) – Introduced. Its initial introduction to Dominica was probably around 1975. Previous reports of Tarebia granifera from Freshwater Lake in Dominica were probably large Melanoides tuberculata. (However, it may be possible to find Tarebia granifera on Dominica; this species does occur on the nearby island of Martinique.)

Physidae

- Physa marmorata (Guilding, 1828) – Previous reports of Physa cubensis = Physa acuta from Dominica were probably Physa marmorata.

Neritiliidae

- Neritilia succinea (Récluz, 1841) – On a riverbank.

Ampullariidae

- Pomacea glauca (Linnaeus, 1758) – Native.

== Land gastropods ==
Helicinidae

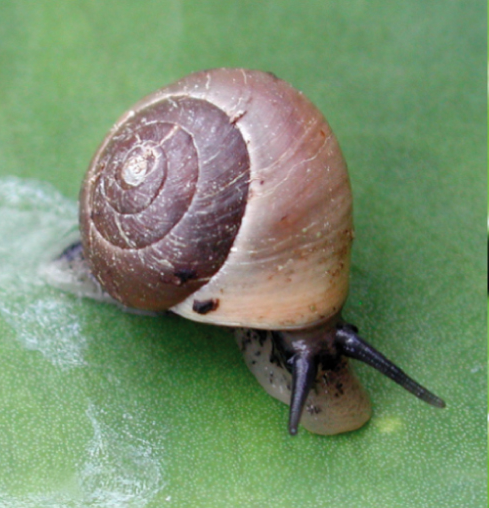
Helicina platychila

- Helicina fasciata (Lamarck, 1822) – First reported in 2009.
- Helicina guppyi Pease, 1871 – First reported in 2009.
- Helicina platychila (Megerle von Mühlfeld, 1824) – First reported in 2009.
- Helicina rhodostoma Gray, 1824 – Endemic.
- Lucidella sp. – Endemic. First reported in 2009. This species lives in moist leaf litter or on ferns in undisturbed forested areas of the island. Although Robert John Lechmere Guppy (1868) reported the Lesser Antillean Lucidella plicatula from Dominica, no evidence was found of the occurrence of that species. The endemic Dominican Lucidella is considerably larger and differs in sculptural details. Like many helicinid species, there are red and yellow colour morphs. Further research is required to establish the taxonomic position of these specimens.
- Alcadia conuloides (Guppy, 1868) – Endemic.

Neocyclotidae

- Amphicyclotulus amethystinus (Guppy, 1868) – Endemic.
- Amphicyclotulus dominicensis Bartsch, 1942 – Endemic.

Pomatiidae

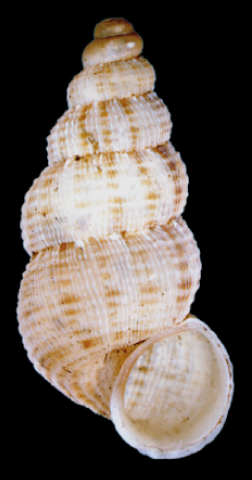
A shell of a Diplopoma sp. from Dominica.

- Diplopoma sp. – Endemic. A snail in the family Pomatiidae was first reported from Dominica in 2009. Most members of this family – and certainly of this genus – typically are obligate calciphiles, occurring only when the substrate contains high levels of environmental calcium carbonate. Therefore, the occurrence of this species on the island was unexpected. It closely resembles Diplopoma crenulatum crenulatum (Potiez & Michaud, 1835), which occurs in Guadeloupe, Marie-Galante and La Désirade. This species may have been introduced from one of those islands when the British and French struggled for possession of Dominica, at the end of the 18th century. The taxon appears to be restricted to the battlements of Fort Shirley at Cabrits Point. The Dominican specimens differ from those of Guadeloupe in having weaker sutural crenulation and in some other minor details. Further research is required in order to establish the taxonomic position of these specimens.

Veronicellidae

- Diplosolenodes occidentalis (Guilding, 1825) – First recorded in 1884, then in 1892
- Sarasinula plebeia (Fischer, 1868) – First reported in 2009.
- Sarasinula marginata (Semper, 1885) – First reported in 2009.
- Veronicella cubensis (L. Pfeiffer, 1840) – Introduced.
- Veronicella aff. floridana (Leidy, 1868) – Introduced. Superficially similar to Veronicella cubensis, it can be distinguished principally by differences in the male genitalia.
- Veronicella sloanei (Cuvier, 1817) – Introduced. First reported in 2009.
- Veronicella sp. – Endemic. First reported in 2009. A single specimen was found, in which the genitalia do not match those of any known species. Molecular analysis shows that it is related to Veronicella portoricensis (Semper, 1886) from the highland rainforests of Puerto Rico. It will be described in a forthcoming paper (Robinson, Barr & Fields, in preparation).

Succineidae

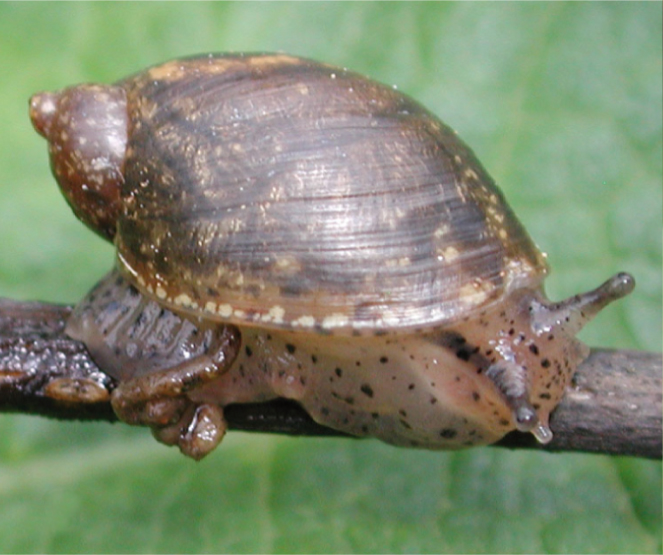
Endemic Succinea sp. from Dominica

- Succinea sp. – Endemic. First reported in 2009. Because West Indian succineid taxonomy is in complete disarray, Robinson et al. (2009) simply placed this material in the genus Succinea, pending a comprehensive study of this poorly understood group. More than one Succinea species appears to be present in Dominica.
- Omalonyx matheronii (Potiez & Michaud, 1838) – Introduced. There are slight differences in the mantle pattern (often a diagnostic feature in some succineids) compared to typical Omalonyx matheronii. Further work is needed to establish the taxonomic position of this material from Dominica.
- Omalonyx unguis (d’Orbigny, 1837) – This species was reported by the Austrian-French Hydrobiological Mission in 1979, but see also comments to Omalonyx matheronii above.

Subulinidae

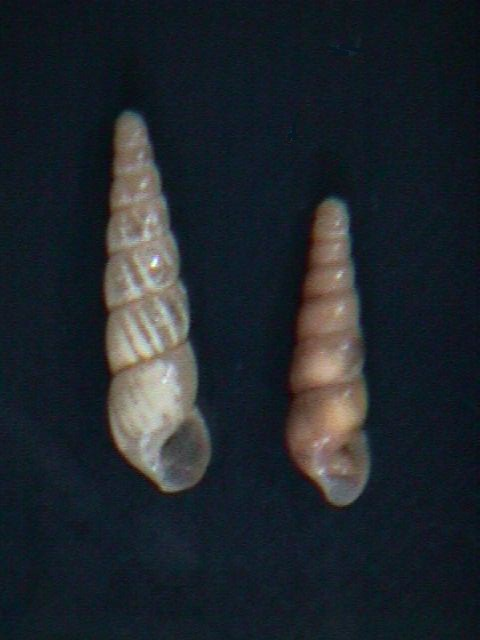
Subulina octona

- Allopeas gracile (Hutton, 1834) – Introduced. First reported in 2009.
- Allopeas micra (d’Orbigny, 1835) – Introduced. First reported in 2009.
- Beckianum beckianum (L. Pfeiffer, 1846) – Introduced. First reported in 2009.
- Leptinaria unilamellata (d’Orbigny, 1837) – Introduced.
- Subulina octona (Bruguière, 1789) – Introduced.

Streptaxidae

- Streptartemon glaber (L. Pfeiffer, 1849) – First reported in 2009.
- Huttonella bicolor (Hutton, 1834) – Introduced. First reported in 2009.
- Streptostele musaecola (Morelet, 1860) – Introduced. First reported in 2009.

Bulimulidae

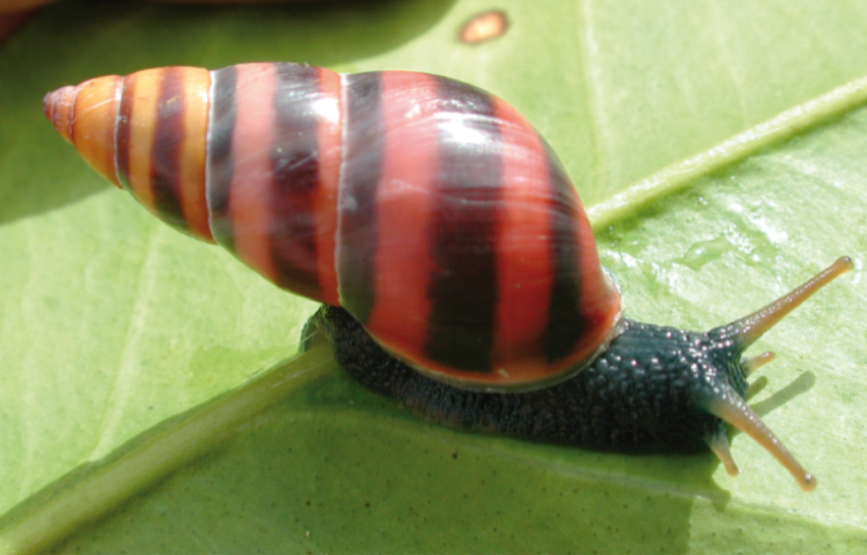
Banded form of Drymaeus laticinctus

- Bulimulus diaphanus fraterculus (Potiez & Michaud, 1835) – First reported in 2009. It is possible that it was introduced from one of the more northerly islands, where it was listed by Breure (1974).
- Bulimulus guadalupensis (Bruguière, 1789) – Introduced.
- Bulimulus limnoides (Férussac, 1832) – First reported in 2009.
- Drymaeus laticinctus (Guppy, 1868) – Endemic.
- Naesiotus stenogyroides (Guppy, 1868) – Endemic.

Amphibulimidae

- Amphibulima patula dominicensis Pilsbry, 1899 – Endemic.
- Amphibulima pardalina Guppy, 1868 – Endemic.
- Amphibulima browni Pilsbry, 1899 – Endemic.

Oleacinidae

- Laevaricella perlucens (Guppy, 1868) – Endemic.

Scolodontidae

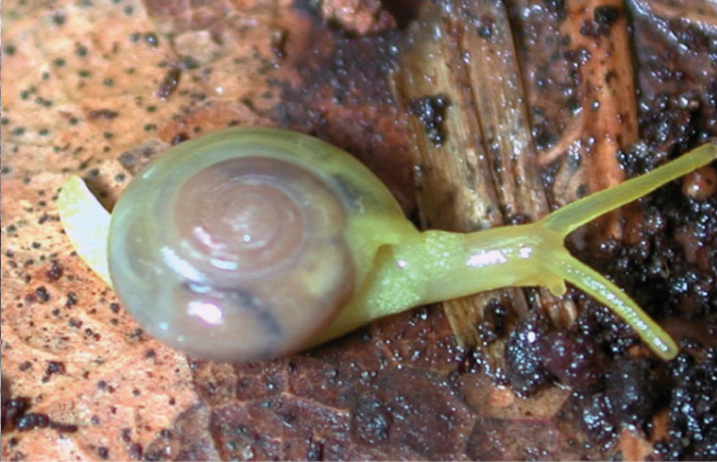
Tamayoa decolorata

- Tamayoa decolorata (Drouët, 1859) – This species is probably an introduced one, as it was found only in disturbed habitats.

Haplotrematidae

- Zophos cf. baudoni (Petit, 1853) – Guppy (1868) expressed some doubts whether the Dominican specimens belonged to this species, which was described by Petit de la Saussaye from Guadeloupe. Ramnath & Fields (2002) were of the same opinion, considering it possibly new to science.

Agriolimacidae

- Deroceras laeve (Müller, 1774) – Introduced. First reported in 2009. Although generally associated with cooler climates, it survives on the island at higher altitudes and is locally quite common.

Pleurodontidae

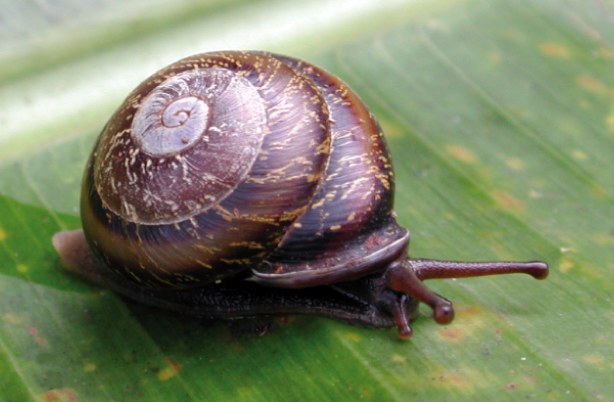
Pleurodonte guadeloupensis dominicana

- Pleurodonte dentiens (Férussac, 1822) – First reported in 2009.
- Pleurodonte guadeloupensis dominicana Pilsbry & Cockerell, 1937 – This subspecies is endemic to Dominica.
- Pleurodonte josephinae (Férussac, 1832) – First reported in 2009.
- Pleurodonte nigrescens (Wood, 1828) – First reported in 2009.

The following species have been reported from Dominica in the literature, but supporting material has not been found. These species, recorded due to inaccuracies of provenance of specimens or misidentifications, should be removed from the faunal list of the island:

- Helicina antillarum (G. B. Sowerby, 1842) – The identity of this taxon remains uncertain. Brown’s report (Brown, 1881) might be a misidentification of Helicina guppyi Pease, 1871.
- Lucidella plicatula (L. Pfeiffer, 1849) – This helicinid has been reported from throughout the West Indies. However, the Dominican Lucidella is clearly different.
- Amphicyclotulus schrammi (Shuttleworth, 1857) – Brown (1881) incorrectly synonymized the Dominican Amphicyclotulus amethystinus with the Guadeloupe taxon.
- Succinea approximans Shuttleworth, 1854 – This taxon occurs on Puerto Rico and has not been reported from intermediate islands. The reports from Thomas B. Bland (1869) and George French Angas (1884) are thus dubious.
- Vaginulus buergueri (Simroth, 1914) – This slug was reported from “Salilia, Dominica” by Forcart (1973). This locality is not known in the island and could not be found in any gazetteer. However, the taxon is reported from the Dominican Republic (Baker, 1925), so confusion seems likely.
- Veronicella tenax H. B. Baker, 1931 – This Cuban endemic species was reported from Dominica by Forcart (1973), based on some specimens that — judging from his descriptions — probably belong to either Veronicella cubensis or Veronicella floridana.
- Drymaeus liliaceus (Férussac, 1821) – This species was reported from Dominica by Angas (1884) and Smith (1888). Férussac’s species is from Puerto Rico and Pilsbry (1899) mentions that he had not seen Dominican specimens. So far, no trace was found of any material that could confirm the presence of this taxon on Dominica. However, the occurrence of a Drymaeus species with a “uniform pale primrose colour” from the island should be further investigated.
- Drymaeus multifasciatus (Lamarck, 1822) – This name was used by several authors for the endemic Dominican species that is here recognized as Drymaeus laticinctus (Guppy, 1868).
- Amphibulima rubescens (Deshayes, 1830) – This species has been reported by various workers from Guadeloupe, Marie-Galante, Dominica and Martinique. It is assumed now that this taxon is endemic to Martinique and that all other reports are misidentifications.

== Freshwater bivalves ==
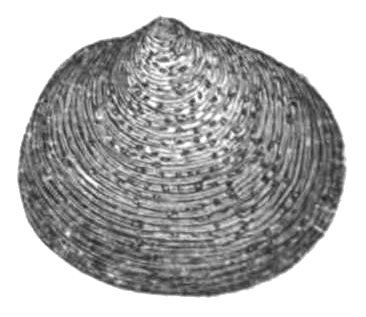
Drawing of Pisidium punctiferum, the only freshwater bivalve on Dominica.

Sphaeriidae

- Pisidium punctiferum (Guppy, 1867) – Up to the 1980s there were no reports of any freshwater bivalves on Dominica. This very small species is the only known freshwater bivalve on Dominica. It was discovered by the Austrian-French Hydrobiological Mission in 1979.

== See also ==
- List of non-marine molluscs of Guadeloupe
- List of non-marine molluscs of Martinique
