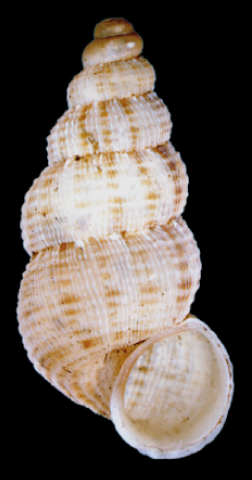

Scientific classification
- Kingdom: Animalia
- Phylum: Mollusca
- Class: Gastropoda
- Subclass: Caenogastropoda
- Order: Littorinimorpha
- Superfamily: Littorinoidea
- Family: Pomatiidae
- Genus: Diplopoma; Pfeiffer, 1859

= Diplopoma =

Genus of gastropods

Chondropoma (ex-Diplopoma) is a genus of operculate land snails, terrestrial gastropod molluscs gastropod in the family Pomatiidae.

== Species ==
Species within the genus Chondropoma include:

- Chondropoma crenulatum (Potiez & Michaud, 1835)
- Chondropoma sp. is known from Dominica
