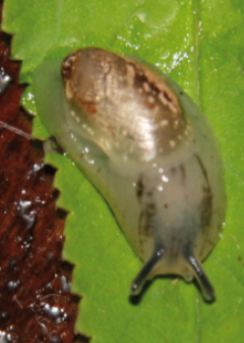
- A live individual of Amphibulima browni

Scientific classification
- Kingdom: Animalia
- Phylum: Mollusca
- Class: Gastropoda
- Order: Stylommatophora
- Family: Amphibulimidae
- Genus: Amphibulima
- Species: A. browni

Binomial name
- Amphibulima browni Pilsbry, 1899

= Amphibulima browni =

Species of gastropod

Amphibulima browni is a species of air-breathing land snail, a terrestrial pulmonate gastropod mollusk in the family Amphibulimidae.

This rare tropical land snail is endemic to the West Indian island of Dominica. The snail has been seen only very rarely since it was first discovered in the late 19th century, and it may eventually be listed as an endangered species. The shell of this snail is oblong and thin, but not fragile, and it has a large aperture.

== Distribution ==
Amphibulima browni is endemic to the West Indian island of Dominica. The type locality is Dominica, the altitude 330 m, "on bananas".

The status of this species, which is one of three species of Amphibulima on Dominica, has been somewhat doubtful for a long period, since this taxon has not been reported since its original description. The collection of a few live specimens during the recent surveys in the 2000s confirmed its presence, and although it appears rare, it seems to be less restricted in distribution than Amphibulima pardalina.

Amphibulima browni is likely to meet the IUCN-criteria for listing as Endangered species.

== Description ==
Amphibulima browni was firstly collected by biologist A. D. Brown and it was originally described by an American malacologist Henry Augustus Pilsbry in 1899.

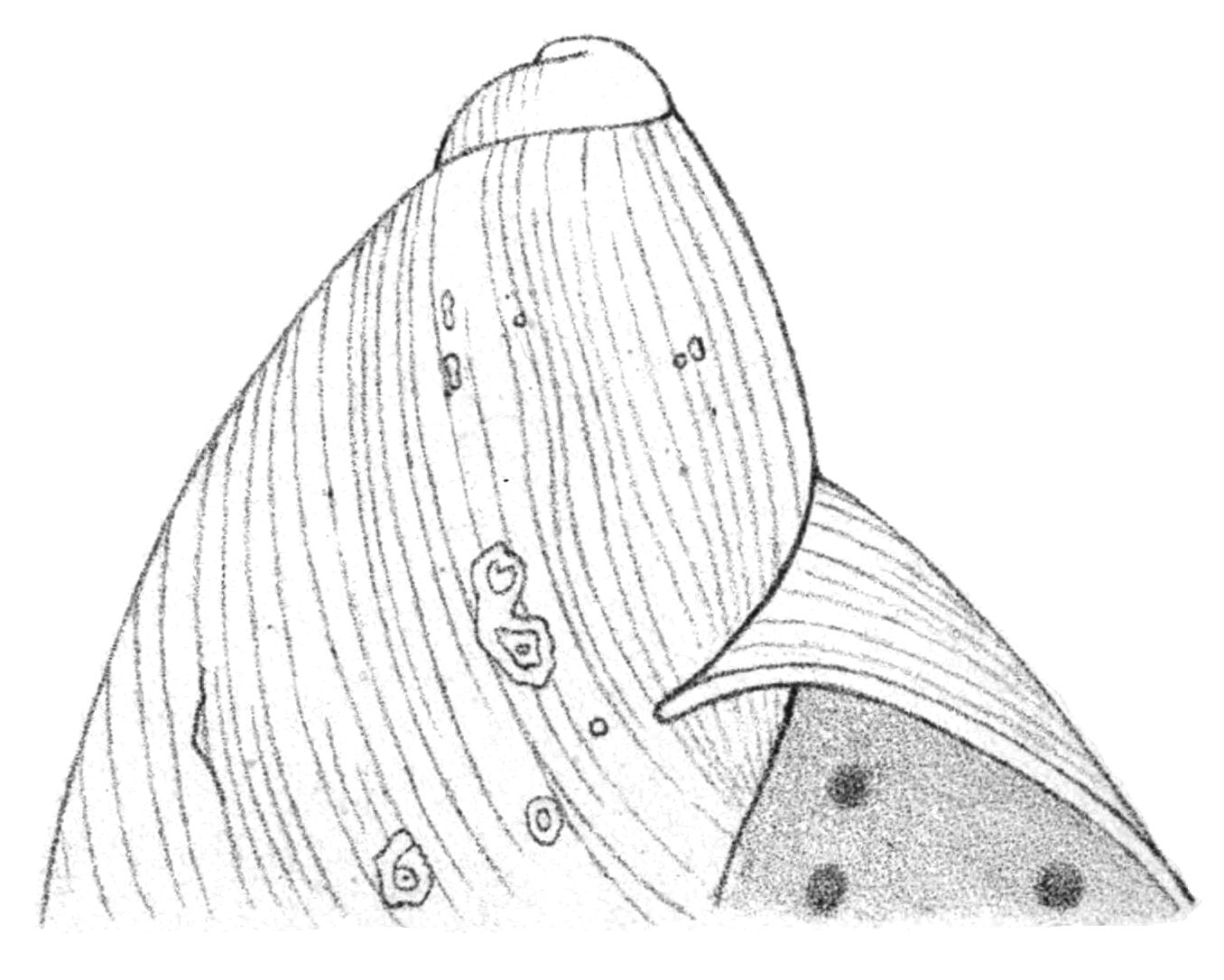
Drawing of the spire of Amphibulima browni.

The shell is oblong, thin, but not elastic or fragile, corneous-olivaceous, with numerous irregularly scattered reddish dots. The surface is somewhat wrinkled with growth-striae and showing numerous very low but coarse irregular spirals. The shell has 2½ whorls. The apex is decidedly raised. The suture of the last half whorl is rapidly descending. The spire is rather slender and its length contained from 4½ to 4¾ times in that of the shell.

The aperture is large, irregularly oblong. The outer lip is somewhat blunt, strongly arcuate above, retracted or waved backward at the position of the slight "shoulder" and somewhat effuse below. The columella is arcuate and thin.

The height of the shell is from 18.5 to 19 mm. The width of the shell is from 10 to 10.5 mm. The height of the aperture is 14.7–15 mm. The height of the spire is 3.8-4.3 mm.

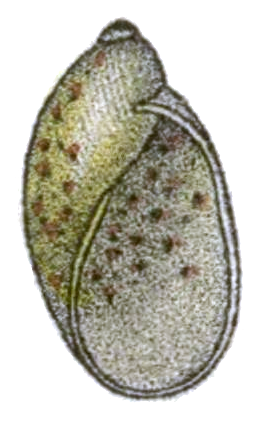
Drawing of apertural view.

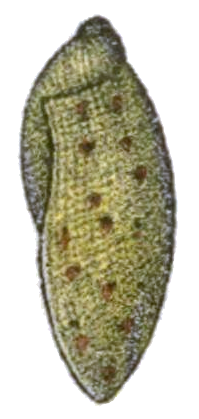
Drawing of lateral view.

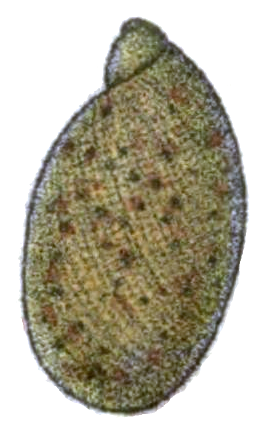
Drawing of abapertural view.
