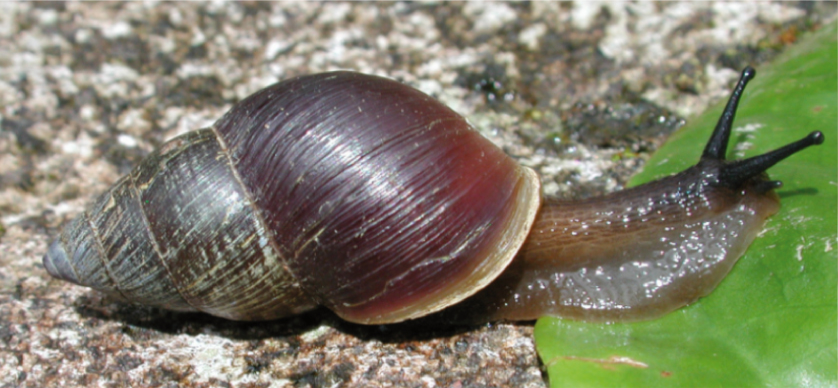

Scientific classification
- Domain: Eukaryota
- Kingdom: Animalia
- Phylum: Mollusca
- Class: Gastropoda
- Order: Stylommatophora
- Family: Bulimulidae
- Genus: Bulimulus
- Species: B. limnoides

Binomial name
- Bulimulus limnoides (Férussac, 1832)

Synonyms
- Bulimus nichollsi Brown, 1881 nomen nudum

= Bulimulus limnoides =

Species of gastropod

Bulimulus limnoides is a species of tropical air-breathing land snail, a pulmonate gastropod mollusk in the subfamily Bulimulinae.

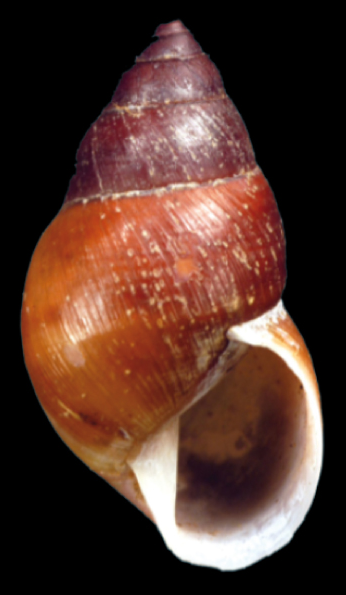
Apertural view of the shell of Bulimulus limnoides

== Distribution ==
Distribution of Bulimulus limnoides include:

- Guadeloupe
- Dominica - Breure (1974), after having compared the type material of Bulimulus limnoides in the Muséum national d'histoire naturelle, Paris, France, placed the Dominican taxon in the synonymy of Férussac’s species. Apart from the locality given by George French Angas (1884), the first precise records of this species from the island have been published in 2009.
- Martinique
- ? Saint Vincent

== Ecology ==
Living specimens were found on small shrubs in Dominica.
