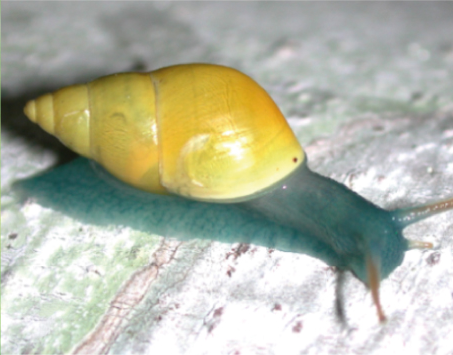
- yellow form of Antidrymaeus laticinctus
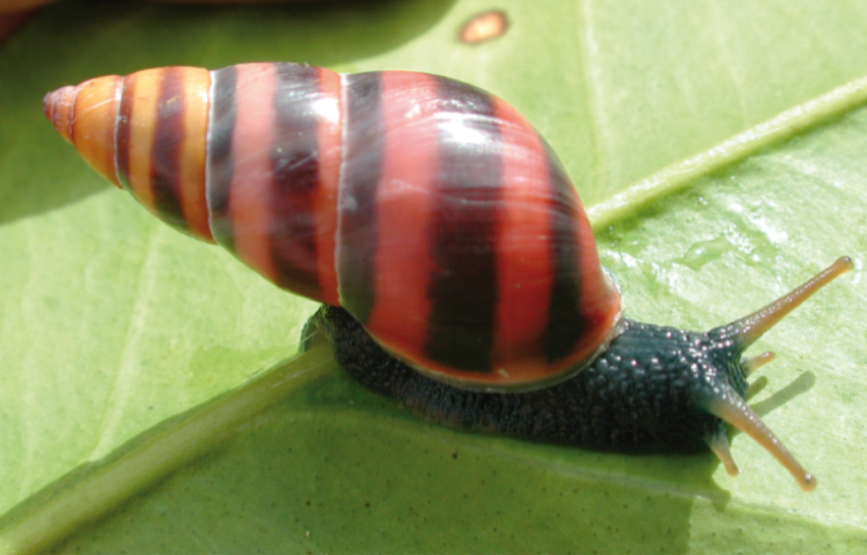
- banded form of Antidrymaeus laticinctus

Scientific classification
- Kingdom: Animalia
- Phylum: Mollusca
- Class: Gastropoda
- Order: Stylommatophora
- Family: Bulimulidae
- Genus: Antidrymaeus
- Species: A. laticinctus

Binomial name
- Antidrymaeus laticinctus (Guppy, 1868)

Synonyms
- Bulimulus laticinctus Guppy, 1868; Bulimus (Leptomerus) multifasciatus Lamarck; Drymaeus virginalis var. dominicanus Pilsbry, 1899; Drymaeus laticinctus

= Antidrymaeus laticinctus =

Species of gastropod

Antidrymaeus laticinctus is a species of tropical air-breathing land snail, a pulmonate gastropod mollusk in the family Bulimulidae.

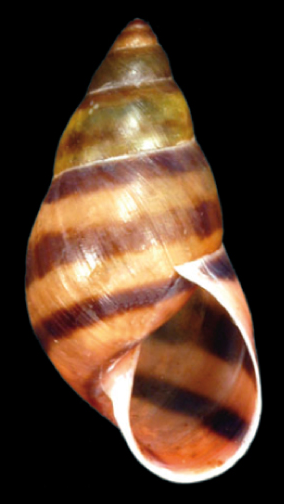
Apertural view of the shell of banded form of Antidrymaeus laticinctus. The height of the shell is 24.5 mm.

== Distribution ==
Antidrymaeus laticinctus is endemic to Dominica. This appears to be a relatively rare species, only observed in some isolated localities.

== Description ==
There are spirally banded and unicoloured forms. In collections the colour of the latter usually fades away and becomes white, as already observed by Henry Augustus Pilsbry (1899). His variety dominicanus of Drymaeus virginalis – a mainland taxon – appears a white specimen. This species is part of the Antidrymaeus multifasciatus species complex, of which a revision is pending (Breure, in preparation).

== Ecology ==
Live animals were collected among fallen leaves and detritus on the ground.
