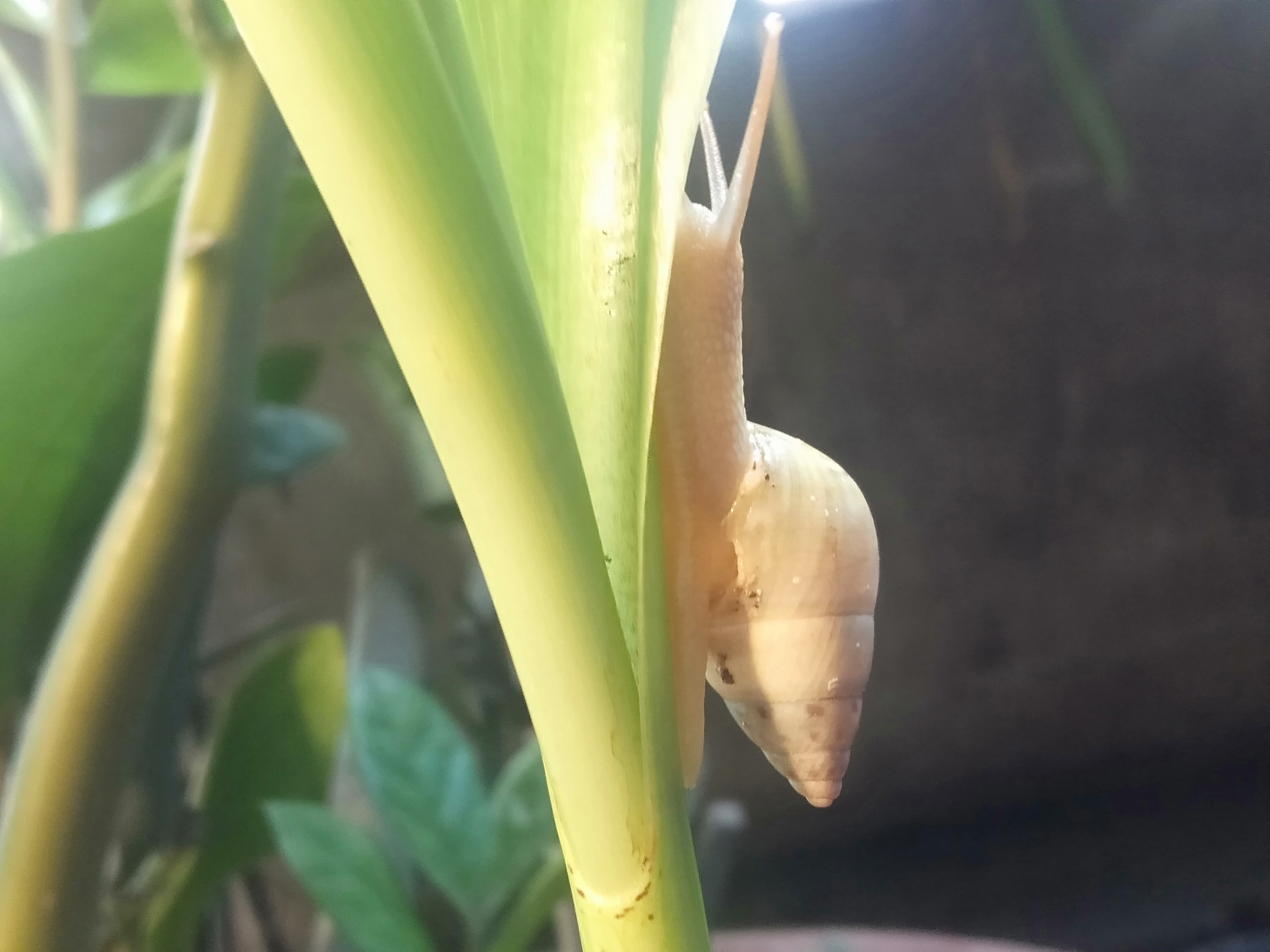

Conservation status
- Secure (NatureServe)

Scientific classification
- Kingdom: Animalia
- Phylum: Mollusca
- Class: Gastropoda
- Order: Stylommatophora
- Family: Bulimulidae
- Genus: Bulimulus
- Species: B. guadalupensis

Binomial name
- Bulimulus guadalupensis (Bruguière, 1789)

Synonyms
- Bulimulus exilis (Gmelin); Bulimus (Leptomerus) exilis

= Bulimulus guadalupensis =

Species of gastropod

Bulimulus guadalupensis is a species of tropical air-breathing land snail, a pulmonate gastropod mollusk in the subfamily Bulimulinae.

The specific name guadalupensis refers to the West Indian island of Guadeloupe.

== Distribution ==
Bulimulus guadalupensis probably originated in the Windward Islands (Breure, 1974). Now it is distributed throughout the Caribbean Basin, including Florida.

- Dominica - introduced It is a highly variable species, which was recorded by Breure (1974) from one locality only: Roseau, Botanical Gardens. Angas (1884) reports it as “abundant on the lower slopes”. It is widely distributed in disturbed habitats throughout lowland Dominica.
- Guadeloupe - introduced
- Martinique - introduced
