= Nereina =

Scientific classification
- Domain: Eukaryota
- Kingdom: Animalia
- Phylum: Mollusca
- Class: Gastropoda
- Subclass: Neritimorpha
- Order: Cycloneritida
- Superfamily: Neritoidea
- Family: Neritidae
- Genus: Nereina de Cristofori & Jan, 1832

Type species
- Nereina lacustris de Cristofori & Jan, 1832

Genus of gastropods

Nereina is a genus of brackish water and freshwater snails with an operculum, aquatic gastropod mollusks in the subfamily Neritininae of the family Neritidae, the nerites.

== Species ==
- Nereina afra (G. B. Sowerby I, 1836)
- Nereina cresswelli Eichhorst, 2016
- Nereina haemastoma (Martens, 1878)
- Nereina punctulata (Lamarck, 1816)

Species brought into synonymy

- Nereina lacustris de Cristofori & Jan, 1832: synonym of Nereina punctulata (Lamarck, 1816)
