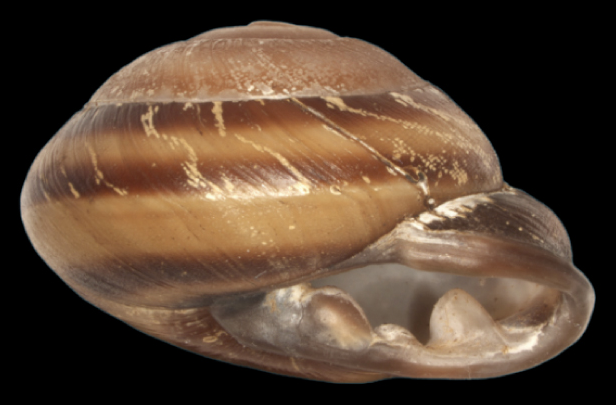
- Apertural view of a shell of Pleurodonte josephinae. The height of the shell is 12.5 mm.

Scientific classification
- Kingdom: Animalia
- Phylum: Mollusca
- Class: Gastropoda
- Order: Stylommatophora
- Family: Pleurodontidae
- Genus: Pleurodonte
- Species: P. josephinae

Binomial name
- Pleurodonte josephinae (Férussac, 1832)

= Pleurodonte josephinae =

Species of gastropod

Pleurodonte josephinae is a species of tropical air-breathing land snail, a pulmonate gastropod mollusk in the family Pleurodontidae.

== Distribution ==
The distribution of Pleurodonte josephinae includes:

- Saint Kitts
- Nevis
- Montserrat
- Guadeloupe
- Dominica

== Description ==
Pleurodonte josephinae differs in shell characters from the typical form described from Guadeloupe. In Dominica thicker- and thinner-shelled forms have been found, which require further research to establish their precise taxonomic relationship.

== Ecology ==
Pleurodonte josephinae lives in damp litter on the ground. This species is generally associated with relatively undisturbed habitats at higher altitudes in Dominica.
