= Sarasinula marginata =

Scientific classification
- Kingdom: Animalia
- Phylum: Mollusca
- Class: Gastropoda
- Order: Systellommatophora
- Family: Veronicellidae
- Genus: Sarasinula
- Species: S. marginata

Binomial name
- Sarasinula marginata (Semper, 1885)

Species of gastropod

Sarasinula marginata is a species of air-breathing land slug, a terrestrial pulmonate gastropod mollusk in the family Veronicellidae, the leatherleaf slugs.

== Description ==
Sarasinula marginata is superficially very similar to Sarasinula plebeia, however it can be distinguished from that species by minor differences in the male genitalia.

== Distribution ==
Sarasinula marginata is found in countries and islands including:

- Dominica. First reported in 2009.
- Guadeloupe
- Brazil, (Paraiba to Rio Grande do Sul)
- Peru
- Colombia

== Ecology ==
This species was found in a dasheen (Colocasia esculenta) field in the Caribbean island of Dominica. It appears to be a minor pest in the agriculture of Dominica.
