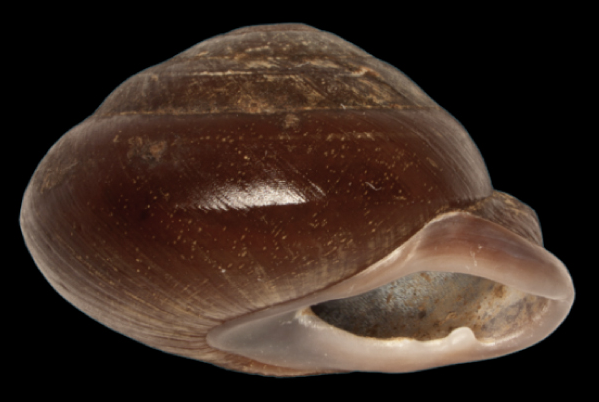
- Apertural view of the shell of Pleurodonte dentiens. The height of the shell is 11.7 mm.

Scientific classification
- Kingdom: Animalia
- Phylum: Mollusca
- Class: Gastropoda
- Order: Stylommatophora
- Family: Pleurodontidae
- Genus: Pleurodonte
- Species: P. dentiens

Binomial name
- Pleurodonte dentiens (Férussac, 1822)

Synonyms
- Helix dentiens

= Pleurodonte dentiens =

Species of gastropod

Pleurodonte dentiens is a species of tropical air-breathing land snail, a pulmonate gastropod mollusk in the family Pleurodontidae.

== Distribution ==
The distribution of Pleurodonte dentiens includes:

- Guadeloupe
- Dominica
- Martinique

== Ecology ==
This species is widespread on the Dominica, especially in disturbed habitats and agricultural areas. It is suspected to cause feeding damage to various crops.
