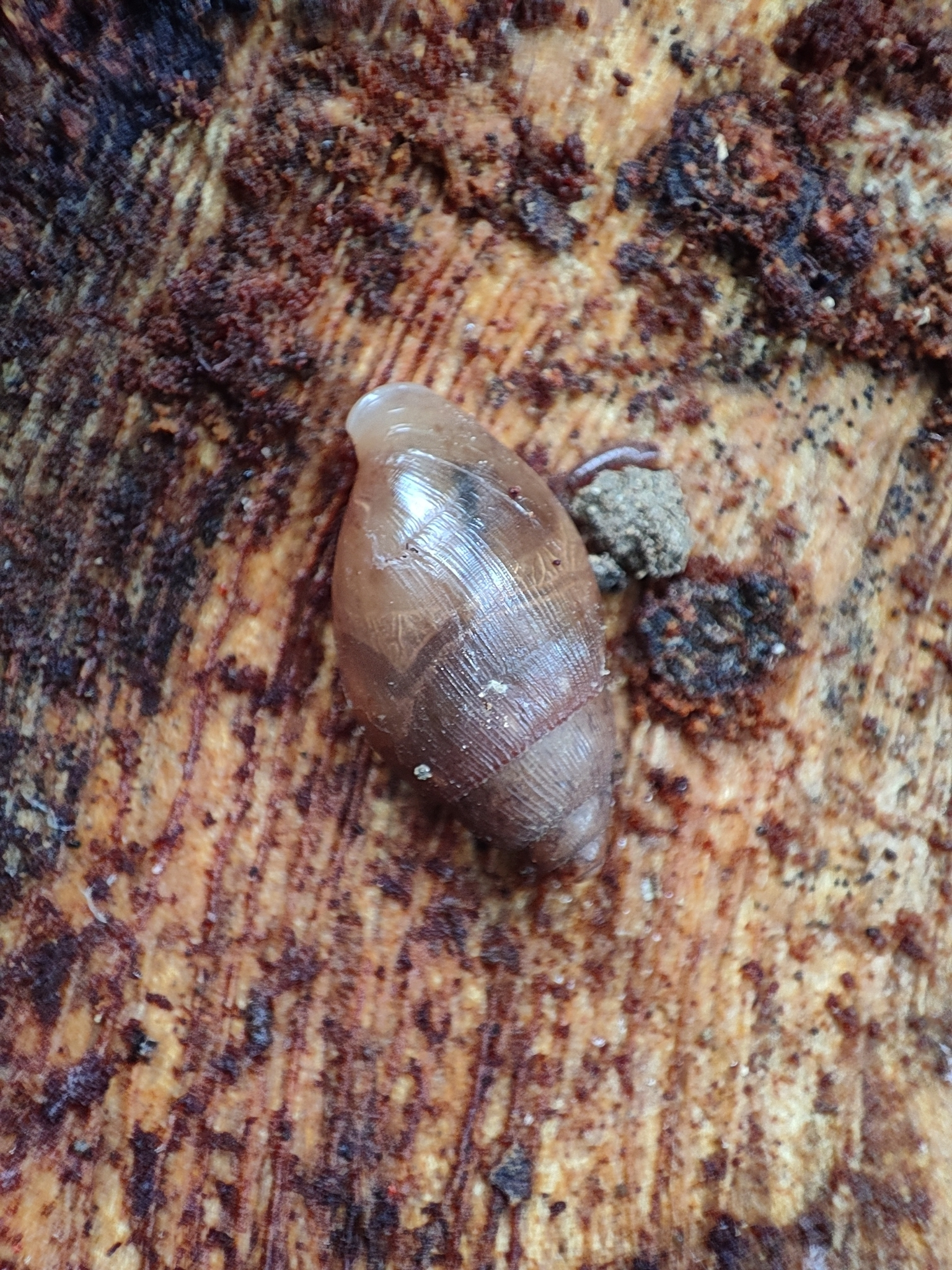

Scientific classification
- Kingdom: Animalia
- Phylum: Mollusca
- Class: Gastropoda
- Order: Stylommatophora
- Family: Achatinidae
- Genus: Leptinaria
- Species: L. unilamellata

Binomial name
- Leptinaria unilamellata (d'Orbigny, 1837)

Synonyms
- Tornatellina (Leptinaria) lamellata Potiez & Michaud

= Leptinaria unilamellata =

Species of gastropod

Leptinaria unilamellata is a species of tropical, air-breathing land snail, a terrestrial pulmonate gastropod mollusk in the family Achatinidae.

== Distribution ==
Leptinaria unilamellata is a widespread species throughout the Caribbean Basin.

The distribution of Leptinaria unilamellata includes:

- West Indies
- Dominica - introduced
- Guadeloupe - introduced
- Martinique - introduced
- other in the Lesser Antilles - introduced
- Central America
- Venezuela
- Peru

== Ecology ==
It is generally found in damp leaf litter and under rotten logs in Dominica.

It is ovoviviparous species.
