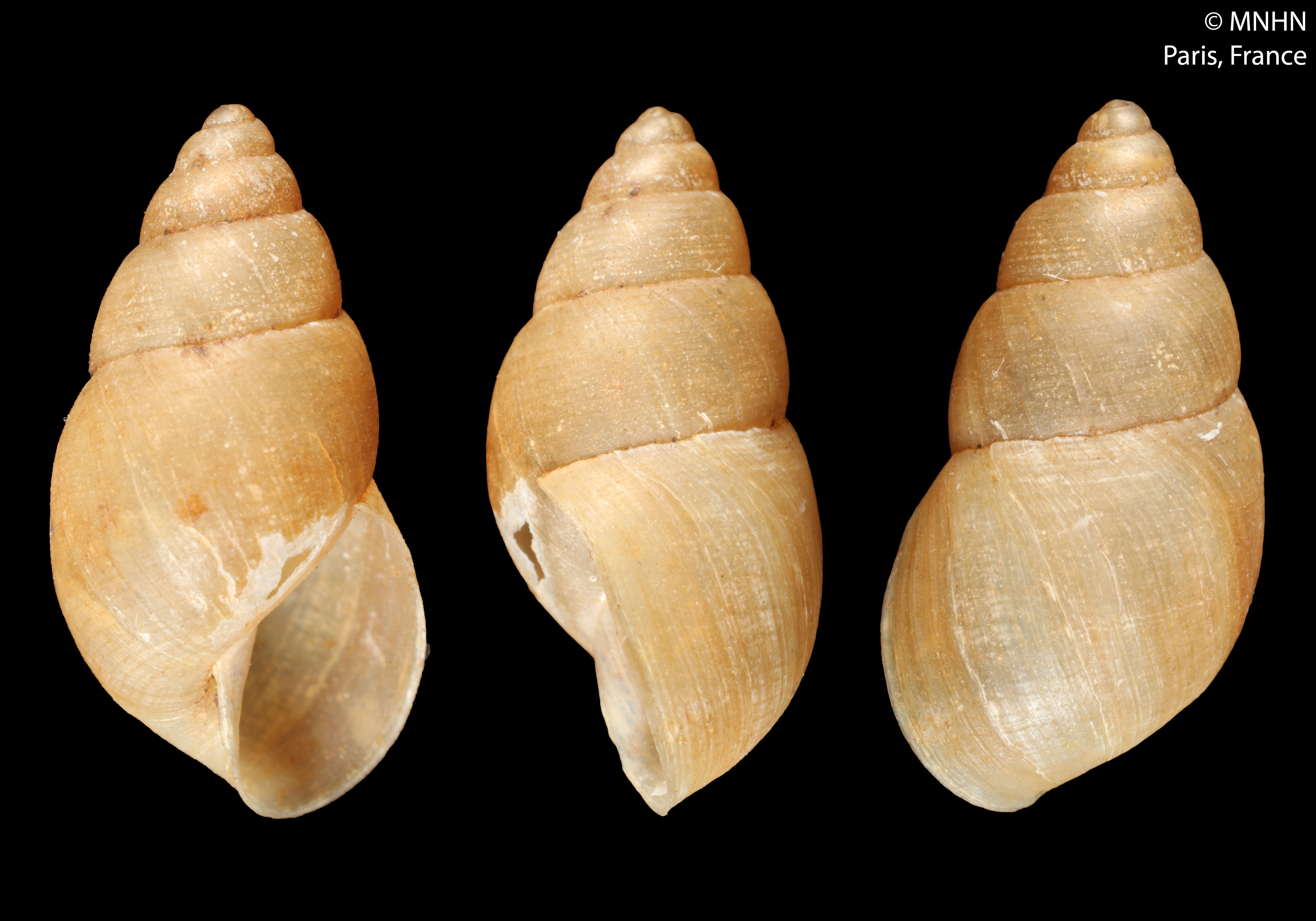
- Shell of Bulimulus diaphanus (lectotype at MNHN, Paris)

Scientific classification
- Kingdom: Animalia
- Phylum: Mollusca
- Class: Gastropoda
- Order: Stylommatophora
- Family: Bulimulidae
- Genus: Bulimulus
- Species: B. diaphanus

Binomial name
- Bulimulus diaphanus (L. Pfeiffer, 1855)

Synonyms
- Bulimulus diaphanus tenuissimus (Férussac, 1832); Bulimus diaphanus L. Pfeiffer, 1855 (original combination); Helix tenuissima Férussac, 1832

= Bulimulus diaphanus =

Species of gastropod

Bulimulus diaphanus is a species of tropical air-breathing land snail, a pulmonate gastropod mollusk in the subfamily Bulimulinae.

== Subspecies ==
- Bulimulus diaphanus fraterculus (Potiez & Michaud, 1835)

== Distribution ==
Distribution of Bulimulus diaphanus fraterculus include Lesser Antilles:

- Saint Martin
- Saint Barts
- Saint Kitts
- Barbuda
- Antigua
- Guadeloupe
- Les Saintes
- Dominica - The first record for Dominica of this taxon has been in 2009. It is possible that Bulimulus diaphanus fraterculus was introduced to Dominica from one of the more northerly islands, where it was listed by Breure (1974).
