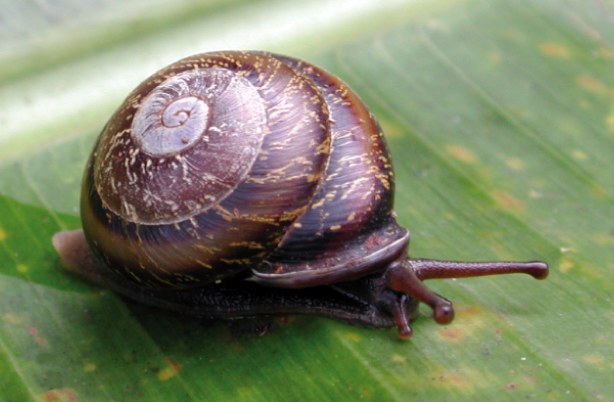
- Pleurodonte guadeloupensis dominicana

Scientific classification
- Kingdom: Animalia
- Phylum: Mollusca
- Class: Gastropoda
- Order: Stylommatophora
- Family: Pleurodontidae
- Genus: Pleurodonte
- Species: P. guadeloupensis

Binomial name
- Pleurodonte guadeloupensis (Pilsbry, 1889)

Synonyms
- Helix (Dentellaria) badia Férussac, 1832 (invalid; not Gmelin, 1791); Helix (Dentellaria) badia var. guadeloupensis Pilsbry, 1889 (basionym); Helix (Helicodonta) badia Férussac, 1832 (invalid: junior homonym of Helix badia Gmelin, 1791); Helix badia Férussac, 1832 (invalid; not Gmelin, 1791)

= Pleurodonte guadeloupensis =

Species of gastropod

Pleurodonte guadeloupensis is a species of tropical air-breathing land snail, a pulmonate gastropod mollusc in the family Pleurodontidae. It occurs in the Lesser Antilles (the Caribbean).

== Subspecies ==
There are four subspecies:

- Pleurodonte guadeloupensis dominicana Pilsbry & Cockerell, 1937 – endemic to Dominica
- Pleurodonte guadeloupensis guadeloupensis (Pilsbry, 1889) – Guadeloupe
- Pleurodonte guadeloupensis martinensis Hovestadt & Neckheim, 2020 – endemic to Saint Martin
- Pleurodonte guadeloupensis roseolabrum (M. Smith, 1911) – Martinique

== Description ==
This is the smallest Pleurodonte species on Dominica. It has a velvety periostracum on the shell surface.

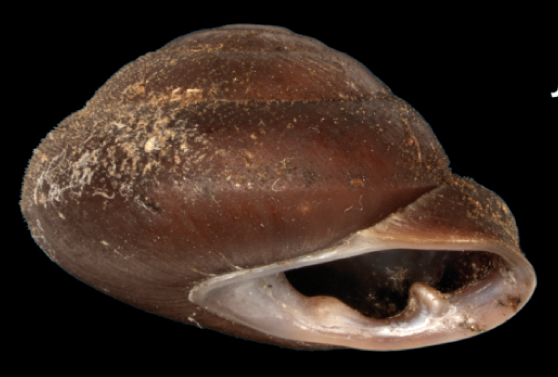
Apertural view of the shell of Pleurodonte guadeloupensis dominicana. The height of the shell is 9.52 mm.

== Distribution ==
The distribution of Pleurodonte guadeloupensis consists of:

- Dominica
- Guadeloupe
- Martinique
- Saint Martin

== Ecology ==
This species is widespread on Dominica and can be found in disturbed habitats and agricultural areas. On Saint Martin, it only occurs in the central part of the island, on the densely wooded hills.
