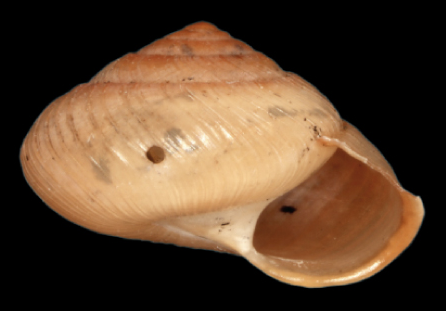
- Photo of an apertural view of the shell of Lucidella sp. from Dominica.

Scientific classification
- Kingdom: Animalia
- Phylum: Mollusca
- Class: Gastropoda
- Order: Cycloneritida
- Superfamily: Helicinoidea
- Family: Helicinidae
- Genus: Lucidella; Swainson, 1840

Type species
- Helicina aureola Gray, 1824

Synonyms
- Lucernella (Lucidella) Swainson, 1840 (original rank); Lucidella (Lucidella) Swainson, 1840· accepted, alternate representation; Lucidella (Perenna) Guppy, 1867 (junior synonym); Lucidella (Poenia) H. Adams & A. Adams, 1856· accepted, alternate representation; Lucidella (Poeniella) H. B. Baker, 1923· accepted, alternate representation; Perenna Guppy, 1867; Prosopis Weinland, 1862; Urichia Guppy, 1895

= Lucidella =

Genus of gastropods

Lucidella is a genus of land snails with an operculum, terrestrial gastropod mollusks in the subfamily Vianinae of the family Helicinidae.

== Distribution ==
Distribution of the genus include Central America and Caribbean:

- Dominica - one undescribed species
- Jamaica - 12 species
- Cuba - 4 species: Lucidella granulum, Lucidella granum, Lucidella rugosa, Lucidella tantilla.
- Dominican Republic - 1 specie:Lucidella beatensis
- Haiti - At least three undetermined species.
- From Mexico to Costa Rica - Lucidella lirata
- Honduras
- South Florida
- French Guiana

== Species ==
Thompson (2008) recognized four subgenera: Lucidella Swainson, 1840, Poeniella H. B. Baker, 1923, Lidsleya Chitty, 1857, Poenia H. & A. Adams, 1856.

But Rosenberg & Muratov (2006) recognized also subgenus Perenna on Jamaica.

Species within the genus Lucidella include:

subgenus Lucidella Swainson, 1840

- Lucidella aureola (Férussac, 1822) - type species
  - Lucidella aureola montegoensis Brown, 1913
- Lucidella granulosa C. B. Adams, 1850
  - Lucidella granulosa undulata Pfeiffer, 1862
- Lucidella inaequalis (Pfeiffer, 1859)
- Lucidella kobelti Wagner, 1910

subgenus Perenna

- Lucidella foxi Pilsbry, 1899
- Lucidella lineata (C. B. Adams, 1845)
- Lucidella nana Pfeiffer, 1857
- Lucidella persculpta Pilsbry & Brown, 1912
- Lucidella yallahsensis Pilsbry & Brown, 1912

subgenus Poenia H. Adams & A. Adams, 1856

- Lucidella adamsiana (Pfeiffer, 1849)
  - Lucidella adamsiana sublaevis H. B. Baker, 1934
- Lucidella coronula (Pfeiffer, 1862)
- Lucidella depressa Gray, 1825
  - Lucidella depressa valida (C. B. Adams, 1851)
- Lucidella pilsbryi Clapp, 1914 - from Honduras
  - Lucidella pilsbryi indecora Pilsbry, 1930
- Lucidella midyetti Richards, 1938 - from Honduras

subgenus ?

- Lucidella granulum (Gundlach in Pfeiffer, 1864)
- Lucidella granum (Pfeiffer, 1856)
- Lucidella lirata (L. Pfeiffer, 1847) - from Mexico to Costa Rica
- Lucidella rugosa (Pfeiffer, 1839)
- Lucidella tantilla (Pilsbry, 1902) - ochre drop
- Lucidella sp. from Dominica
