= Drymaeus liliaceus =

Scientific classification
- Kingdom: Animalia
- Phylum: Mollusca
- Class: Gastropoda
- Order: Stylommatophora
- Family: Bulimulidae
- Genus: Drymaeus
- Species: D. liliaceus

Binomial name
- Drymaeus liliaceus (Férussac, 1821)

Synonyms
- Bulimus (Leiostracus) liliaceus

Species of gastropod

Drymaeus liliaceus is a species of tropical air-breathing land snail, a pulmonate gastropod mollusk in the family Bulimulidae.
