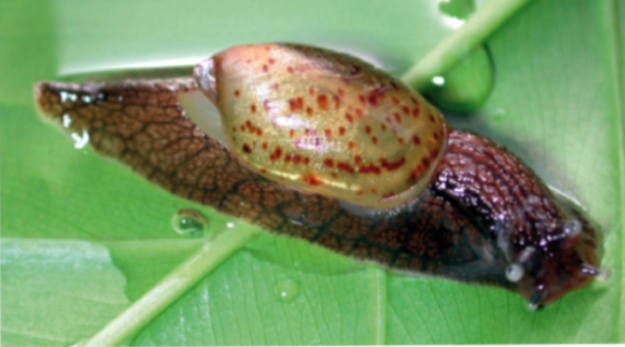
- a darker form of Amphibulima pardalina

Scientific classification
- Kingdom: Animalia
- Phylum: Mollusca
- Class: Gastropoda
- Order: Stylommatophora
- Family: Amphibulimidae
- Genus: Amphibulima
- Species: A. pardalina

Binomial name
- Amphibulima pardalina Guppy, 1868

= Amphibulima pardalina =

Species of gastropod

Amphibulima pardalina is a species of tropical air-breathing land snail, a pulmonate gastropod mollusk in the family Amphibulimidae.

== Distribution ==
Amphibulima pardalina is endemic to Dominica. The type locality is Mount Kuliabon and Morne Diablotin, Dominica.

Amphibulima pardalina is very restricted in range and probably meet the IUCN-criteria of Critically Endangered species. This species is restricted to higher localities.

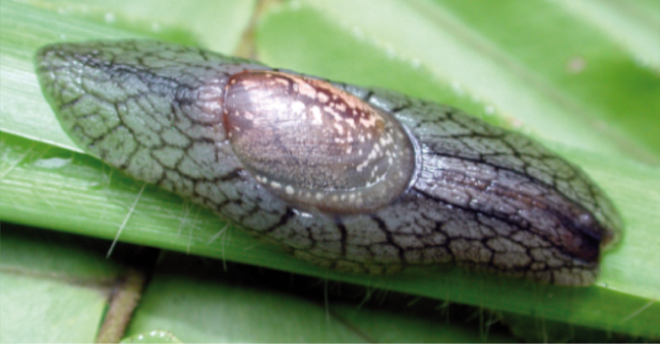
a lighter form of Amphibulima pardalina

== Description ==
This rare species, considered by Henry Augustus Pilsbry (1899) to be distinct on account of its coarse sculpture, can be found both as a light and a dark colour form.

The length of the shell attains 20 mm, its diameter 11 mm.

(original description in Latin) The shell is elongate-oval in shape and amber-like in coloratio. It is characterized by its thin, flexible, and transparent nature. It displays a lightly decussate texture and is marked with tawny hues.

The shell consists of three whorls, with a small, rounded spire. The aperture is large and widens towards the front. The peristome is simple, with its upper portion bent inward. The suture descends along the shell's length.

(original description in English) The shell, oval-elongate and resembling Succinea in form, is characterized by its thin, flexible, and somewhat translucent nature. It displays a finely decussate surface texture and is typically marked by irregular rows of small, elongate, tawny spots. The shell possesses a small, rounded spire and a notably large, significantly dilated aperture.

== Ecology ==
It was found in very damp and cool habitats in cloud forest at higher altitudes.
