= Lucidella plicatula =

Scientific classification
- Kingdom: Animalia
- Phylum: Mollusca
- Class: Gastropoda
- Order: Cycloneritida
- Family: Helicinidae
- Genus: Lucidella
- Species: L. plicatula

Binomial name
- Lucidella plicatula (L. Pfeiffer, 1849)

Species of gastropod

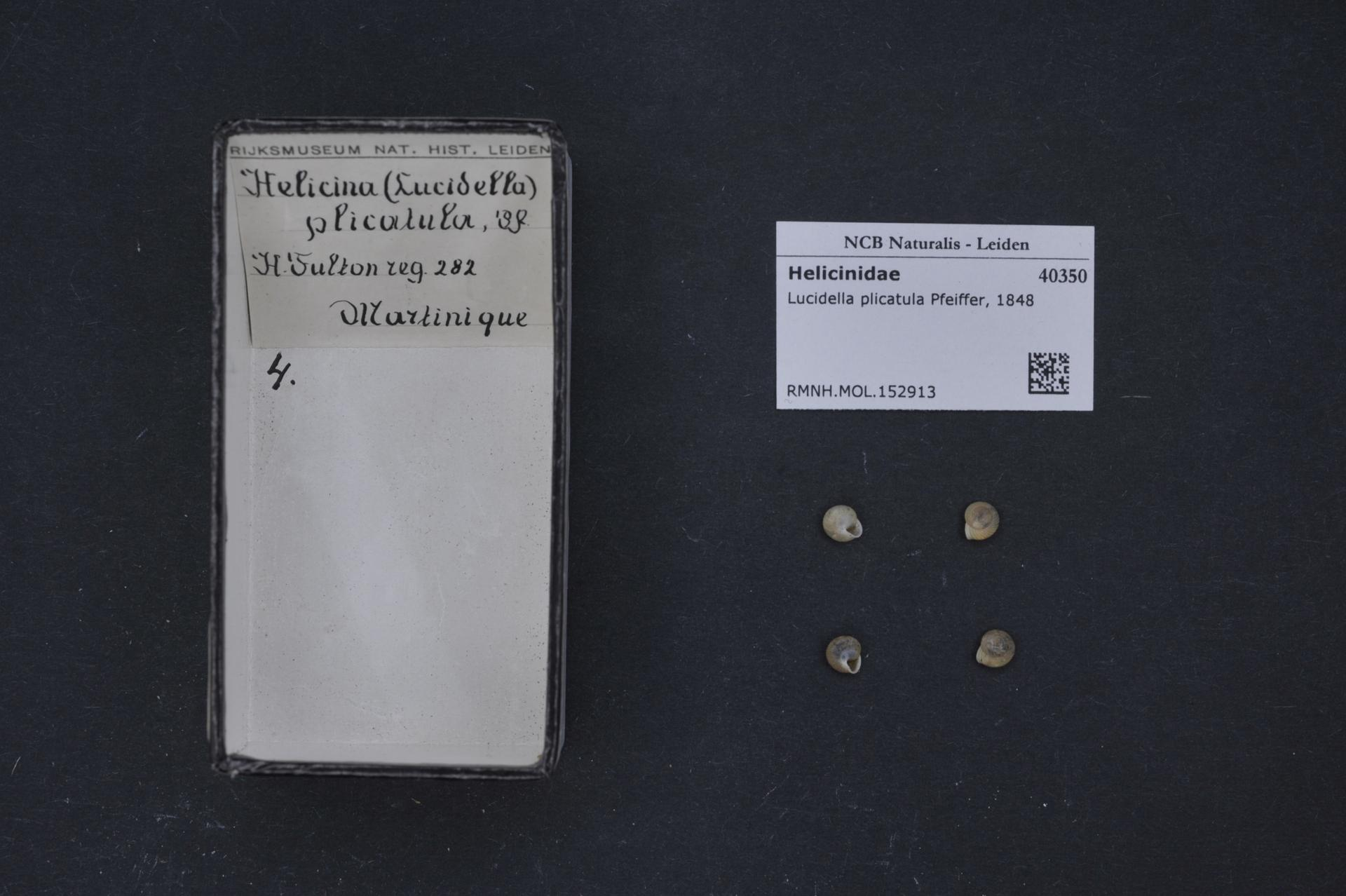
Lucidella plicatula Pfeiffer, 1848.

Lucidella plicatula is a species of land snail with an operculum, terrestrial gastropod mollusk in the family Helicinidae.

== Distribution ==
Distribution of Lucidella plicatula includes West Indies.
