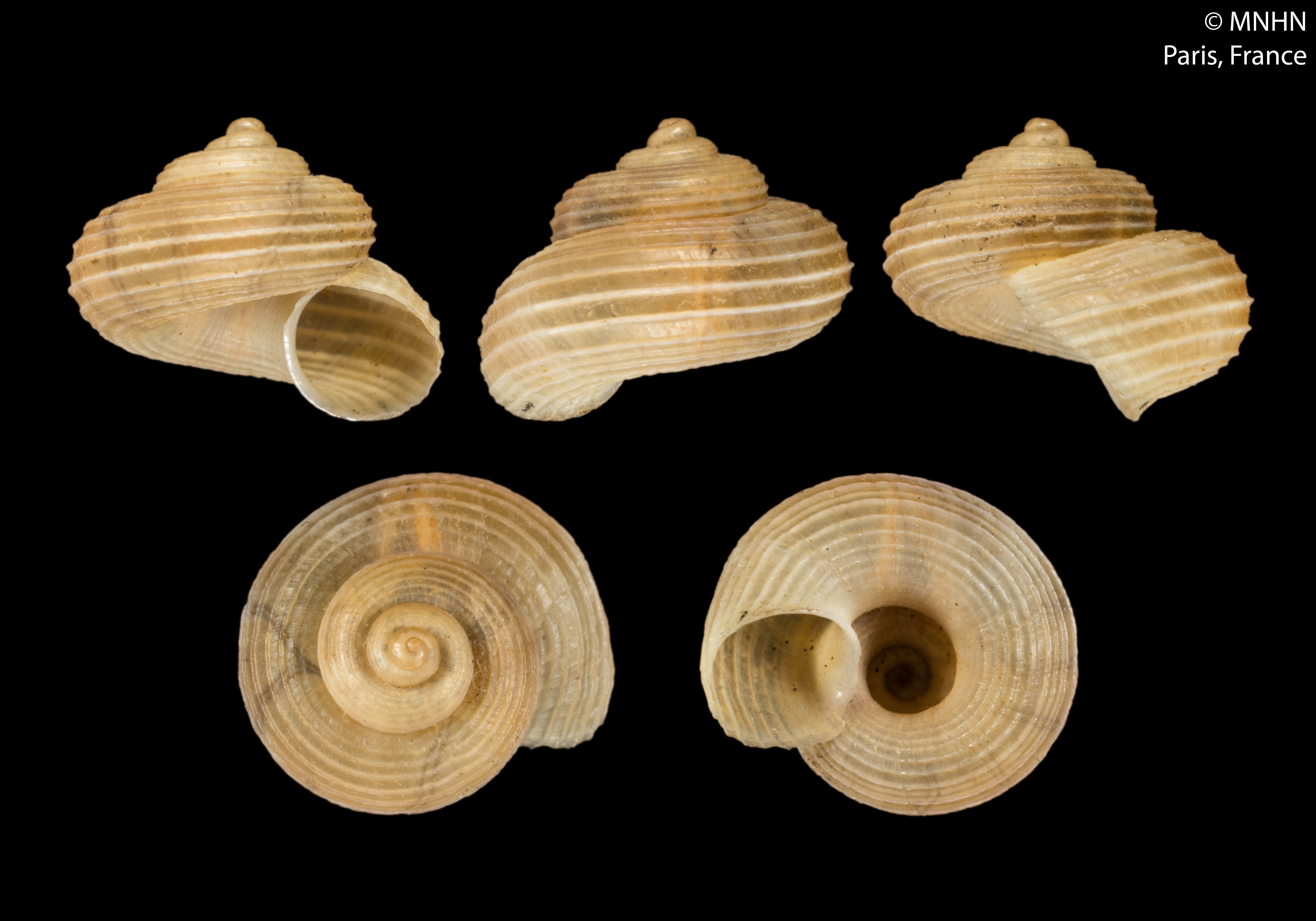
- Shell of Amphicyclotulus schrammi (syntype at MNHN, Paris)

Scientific classification
- Kingdom: Animalia
- Phylum: Mollusca
- Class: Gastropoda
- Subclass: Caenogastropoda
- Order: Architaenioglossa
- Family: Neocyclotidae
- Genus: Amphicyclotulus
- Species: A. schrammi

Binomial name
- Amphicyclotulus schrammi (Shuttleworth, 1857)

Synonyms
- Amphicyclotulus (Amphicyclotulus) schrammi (Shuttleworth, 1857)· accepted, alternate representation; Amphicyclotus schrammi (Shuttleworth, 1857) (unaccepted combination); Cyclostoma (Cyclophorus) schrammi Shuttleworth, 1857 (original combination)

= Amphicyclotulus schrammi =

Species of gastropod

Amphicyclotulus schrammi is a species of tropical land snail with a gill and an operculum, a terrestrial gastropod mollusc in the family Neocyclotidae.

== Description ==
The height of the shell attains 56.5 mm, its diameter 9.3 mm.

(Original description in Latin) This thin shell is broadly umbilicate, subdepressed orbicular. It exhibits dense, fine striations and is encircled by somewhat spaced, elevated, sharp and spiral lirae. The shell is olive-green, slightly shiny, and translucent. The spire is slightly elevated with a somewhat sharp apex, and the suture is moderate. It comprises 4.5 convex whorls, with the body whorl barely descending. The aperture is subcircular and nearly non-oblique. The peristome is simple, sharp, briefly disjunct at the penultimate whorl, and features a somewhat dilated columellar margin. The operculum is horny, translucent, deeply concave externally, tightly spiraled, and consists of approximately 8 whorls.

== Distribution ==
Guadeloupe
