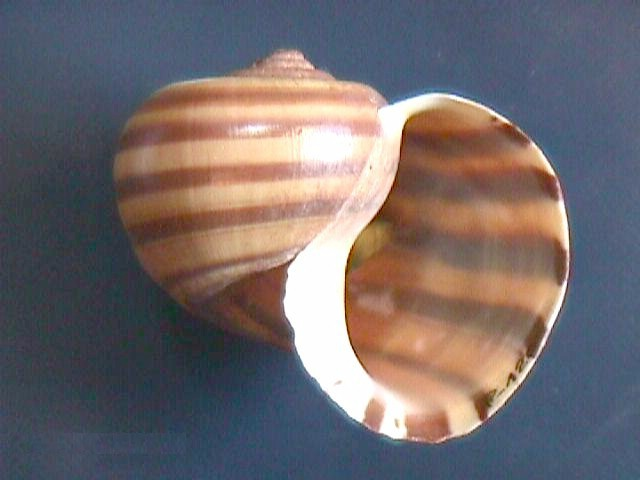
- Apertural view of a shell of Pomacea glauca

Conservation status
- Least Concern (IUCN 3.1)

Scientific classification
- Kingdom: Animalia
- Phylum: Mollusca
- Class: Gastropoda
- Subclass: Caenogastropoda
- Order: Architaenioglossa
- Family: Ampullariidae
- Genus: Pomacea
- Species: P. glauca

Binomial name
- Pomacea glauca (Linnaeus, 1758)

= Pomacea glauca =

Species of gastropod

Pomacea glauca is a species of freshwater snails, an aquatic gastropod mollusk in the family Ampullariidae, the apple snails.

The species varies greatly in color, shape and size, growing to around 70 mm. Its colors include a pale yellow with brown spiral bands to darker shades of brown or purple with darker bands.

== Distribution ==
The species is found in the Dominican Republic, the Lesser Antilles and northern South America including Venezuela, Colombia, Brazil and on the West Indian island of Dominica.

== Ecology ==
This snail generally inhabits clean and clear water, where it can reach high population densities. The eggs are bright green and around the size of a small pea.
