= Succinea approximans =

Scientific classification
- Kingdom: Animalia
- Phylum: Mollusca
- Class: Gastropoda
- Order: Stylommatophora
- Family: Succineidae
- Genus: Succinea
- Species: S. approximans

Binomial name
- Succinea approximans Shuttleworth, 1854

Species of gastropod

Succinea approximans is a species of air-breathing land snail, a terrestrial pulmonate gastropod mollusc in the family Succineidae, the amber snails.

== Distribution ==
The type locality is in Puerto Rico. Robert James Shuttleworth, the authority of this species mentioned six localities in his original description: "prope San Juan, Fajardo, Ceiba, Humacao, Luquillo et ad Rio Blanco".

Other reports of Succinea approximans include:

- Grenada - occurs widely
- "Lesser Antilles", but not in Dominica
- Saint Lucia

Robinson et al. (2009) commented that it has not been reported from any intermediate islands. They considered reports of this species by Thomas B. Bland (1869) and George French Angas (1884) to be dubious.

== Description ==
The dimensions of the shell of the type specimen are as follows: the height of the shell is 12 mm; the width of the shell is 7 mm; the height of the aperture is 9 mm.

In Grenada, the height of the shell of this species is 10 mm.

== Ecology ==
The habitat of Succinea approximans ranges from relatively dry places to wet areas. In Grenada, Succinea approximans lives among leaf litter.
