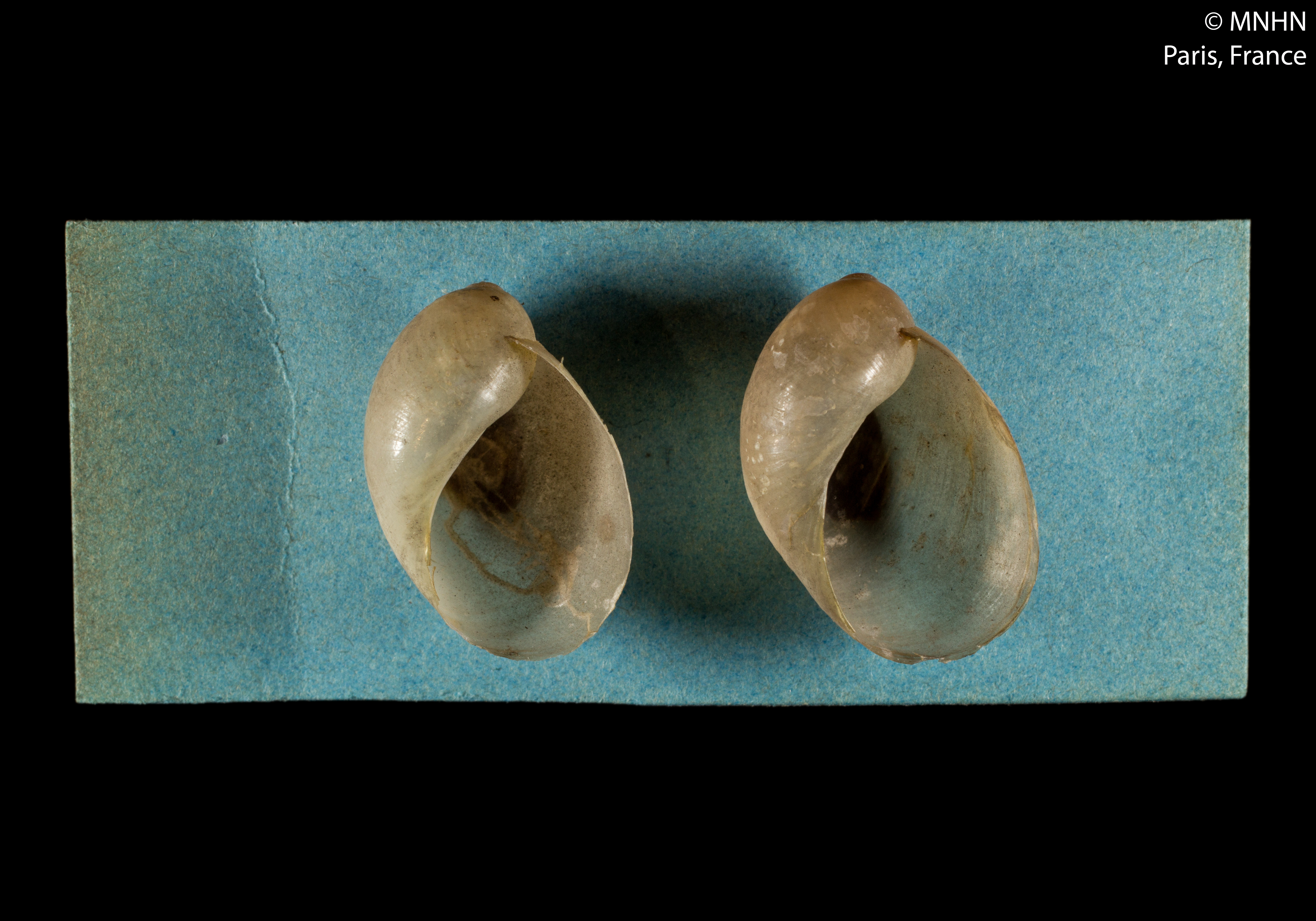

Scientific classification
- Kingdom: Animalia
- Phylum: Mollusca
- Class: Gastropoda
- Order: Stylommatophora
- Family: Amphibulimidae
- Genus: Rhodonyx; P. Fischer, 1873
- Species: R. rubescens

Binomial name
- Rhodonyx rubescens (Deshayes, 1830)

Synonyms
- Amphibulima (Rhodonyx) rubescens (Deshayes, 1830 ); Succinea rubescens Deshayes, 1830

= Rhodonyx =

Species of mollusc

Rhodonyx rubescens is a species of tropical air-breathing land snail, a pulmonate gastropod mollusk in the family Amphibulimidae. It is the only species in the genus Rhodonyx.

== Distribution ==
Rhodonyx rubescens has been reported by various workers from Guadeloupe, Marie-Galante, Dominica and Martinique. It is assumed now that this taxon is endemic to Martinique and all other reports are misidentifications.
