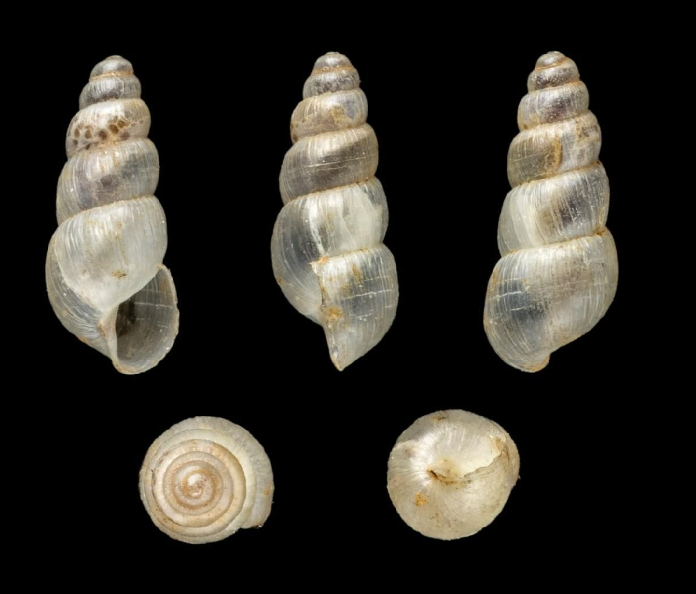
- Shell of Allopeas micra (specimen at the National History Museum, London)

Conservation status
- Secure (NatureServe)

Scientific classification
- Kingdom: Animalia
- Phylum: Mollusca
- Class: Gastropoda
- Order: Stylommatophora
- Family: Achatinidae
- Genus: Allopeas
- Species: A. micra

Binomial name
- Allopeas micra (d'Orbigny, 1835)
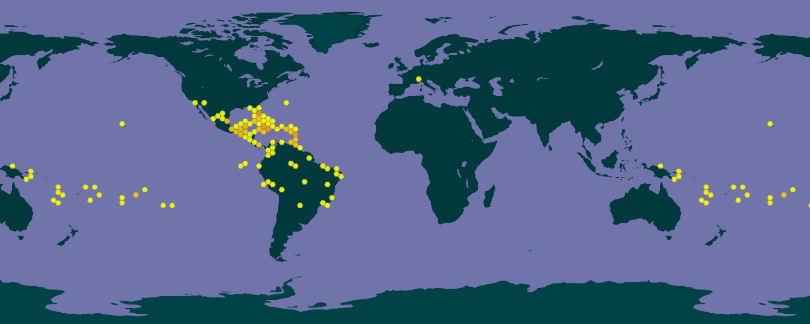

Synonyms
- See list

= Allopeas micra =

Species of gastropod

Allopeas micra is a species of small, tropical, air-breathing land snail, a terrestrial pulmonate gastropod mollusk in the family Achatinidae.

Subspecies

- Allopeas micra mazatlanicum (Pilsbry, 1931)
- Allopeas micra micra (A. d'Orbigny, 1835)

== Description ==
The shell is elongated and turreted, thin and translucent. It shows very pronounced striations formed by small, sharp, raised ribs. It is nearly umbilicate, with a long, almost conical spire that ends in an obtuse apex. The shell is composed of 8 whorls that are slightly rounded. The aperture is oval with sharp, well-defined margins, and the columella is straight. The shell exhibits a yellowish-white color.

== Distribution ==
The distribution of Allopeas micra includes:

- West Indies
- from Mexico to Bolivia
- Dominica - introduced. First reported in 2009.

== Synonyms ==
- Achatina lucida Poey, 1852 junior subjective synonym
- Bulimus contractus Poey, 1853 junior subjective synonym
- Bulimus octonoides C. B. Adams, 1845 junior subjective synonym
- Bulimus tryonianus Tate, 1870 junior subjective synonym
- Helix (Cochlitoma) micra A. d'Orbigny, 1835 superseded combination
- Helix micra A. d'Orbigny, 1835 superseded combination
- Lamellaxis (Allopeas) micron (A. d'Orbigny, 1835) incorrect grammatical agreement of specific epithet
- Lamellaxis (Allopeas) micrus (A. d'Orbigny, 1835) incorrect grammatical agreement of specific epithet
- Lamellaxis (Leptopeas) micra (A. d'Orbigny, 1835) superseded combination
- Lamellaxis micra (A. d'Orbigny, 1835) superseded combination
- Lamellaxis micrus A. d'Orbigny, 1835 incorrect grammatical agreement of specific epithet
- Leptopeas micra (A. d'Orbigny, 1835) superseded combination
- Opeas dresseli (K. Miller, 1879) junior subjective synonym
- Opeas lucida (Poey, 1852) unaccepted
- Opeas micra (A. d'Orbigny, 1835) superseded combination
- Opeas octonoides (C. B. Adams, 1845) junior subjective synonym
- Opeas tryonianum (Tate, 1870) junior subjective synonym
- Opeas tryonianum var. subovale E. von Martens, 1898 junior subjective synonym
- Stenogyra (Opeas) dresseli K. Miller, 1879 junior subjective synonym
- Stenogyra (Opeas) octonoides (C. B. Adams, 1845) junior subjective synonym
- Stenogyra octonoides (C. B. Adams, 1845) junior subjective synonym
