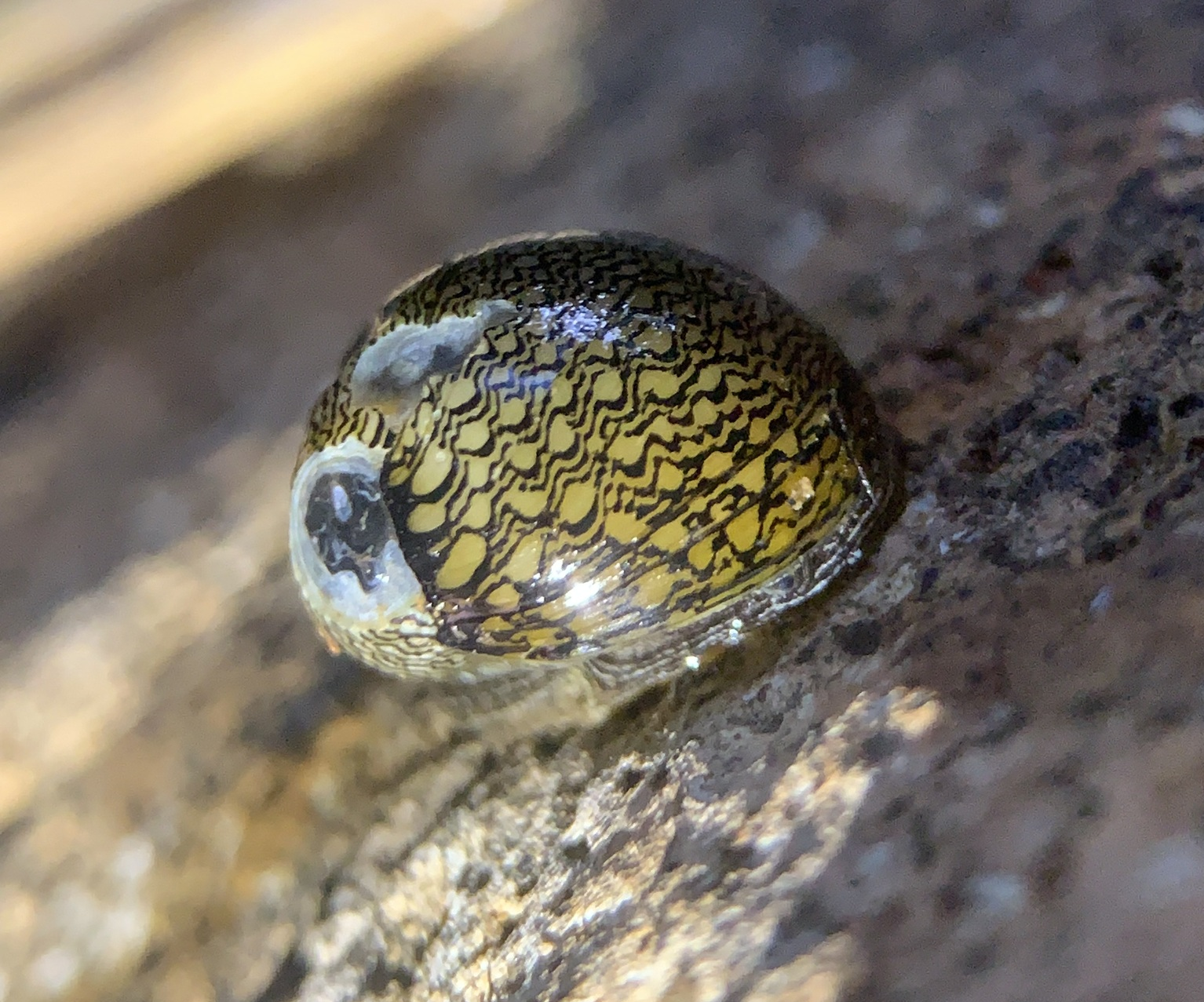

Scientific classification
- Kingdom: Animalia
- Phylum: Mollusca
- Class: Gastropoda
- Subclass: Neritimorpha
- Order: Cycloneritida
- Family: Neritidae
- Genus: Nereina
- Species: N. punctulata

Binomial name
- Nereina punctulata Lamarck, 1816

Synonyms
- Nereina lacustris de Cristofori & Jan, 1832; Neritina aperta G. B. Sowerby I, 1825; Neritina crassiculum G. B. Sowerby I, 1836; Neritina punctulata Lamarck, 1816 (original combination); Neritina sargi Crosse & P. Fischer, 1893

= Nereina punctulata =

Species of gastropod

Nereina punctulata is a species of freshwater snail with an operculum, an aquatic gastropod mollusk in the family Neritidae, the nerites.

== Distribution ==
Distribution of Nereina punctulata include:

- Puerto Rico
- Dominica

== Ecology ==
Nereina punctulata lives in rivers.

The estimation of the lifespan is at least 3–7 years. Neritina punctulata migrates upstream during lifespan.

It is a grazer, that feeds on algae. It is dominant grazer in Río Mameyes.
