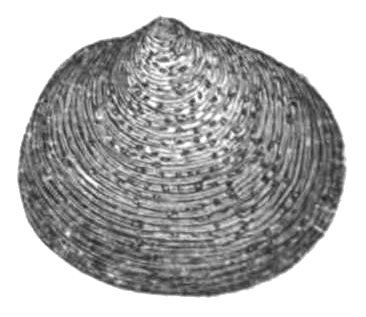
- Drawing of Pisidium punctiferum
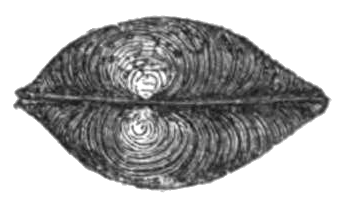
- Drawing of Pisidium punctiferum

Conservation status
- Apparently Secure (NatureServe)

Scientific classification
- Kingdom: Animalia
- Phylum: Mollusca
- Class: Bivalvia
- Order: Sphaeriida
- Family: Sphaeriidae
- Genus: Pisidium
- Species: P. punctiferum

Binomial name
- Pisidium punctiferum (Guppy, 1867)

Synonyms
- Cyclas punctifera Guppy, 1867

= Pisidium punctiferum =

Striate peaclam

Species of bivalve

Pisidium punctiferum, the striate peaclam, is a freshwater bivalve of the family Sphaeriidae.

== Distribution ==
The type locality is a pond at Saint Ann's River, near Port of Spain, Trinidad. They were collected by the government botanist Mr. H. Prestoe and by Robert John Lechmere Guppy in 1867.

- USA:
  - Kentucky
  - Virginia
  - Illinois
  - northeast Florida
- Dominica
- Brazil

== Description ==
The shell is somewhat subquadrately oval, thin, diaphanous, close, finely striate concentrically, whitish horny, or slightly tinted with fuscous patches near the umbones, and covered with numerous granular points, which are finer and more crowded on the umbones, where the concentric striation is less evident. The shell is anteriorly rather short and subangulate, posteriorly a little truncate. The hinge is with well-developed lateral teeth in both valves, 1-1/1-1. The cardinal teeth is small 2/2.

This curious little shell varies somewhat, and specimens are sometimes more oval and compressed than the one figured. Occasionally they are higher and shorter, with a steeper posterior slope. The granular points are more easily seen in dead shells, which are opaque. In living examples they seem, under a strong lens, to bear short hairs. The length of a large example is 4 mm, the height is 3.5 mm, the thickness is 2.5 mm. Of an average example the length is 3 mm, the height is 2.5 mm, the thickness is 2 mm.

Among species of the genus Pisidium the shell appear to resemble most Cyclas argentina D'Orb. (=? Pisidium argentina), and Cyclas calyculata Drap. (=? Pisidium calyculata). It is usually more equilateral than either of those species. The epidermis is thin and colourless, so that the striate gills may be seen through the shell. The umbones are not so prominent as those of Pisidium calyculata, but they are occasionally flattened or otherwise distorted. The foot is whitish, translucid, and may be extruded to a length more than equalling that of the shell, the body being brought up to it with a jerk, as in allied species. Full-grown examples are slightly more equilateral and more angulate than young ones.
