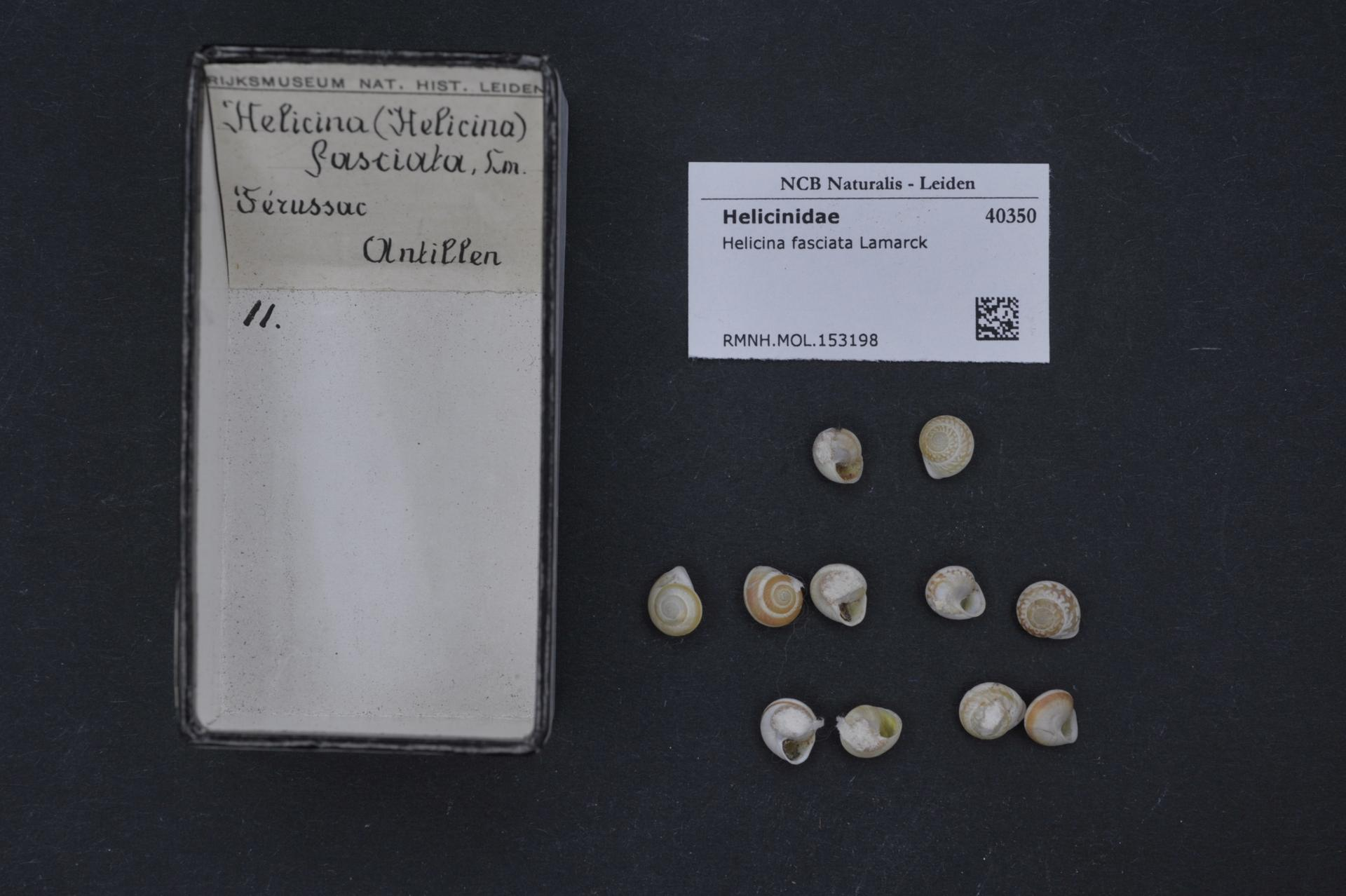

Scientific classification
- Kingdom: Animalia
- Phylum: Mollusca
- Class: Gastropoda
- Order: Cycloneritida
- Family: Helicinidae
- Genus: Helicina
- Species: H. fasciata

Binomial name
- Helicina fasciata (Lamarck, 1822)

= Helicina fasciata =

Species of gastropod

Helicina fasciata is a species of tropical land snail with an operculum, a terrestrial gastropod mollusc in the family Helicinidae.

== Distribution ==
This species lives in the Lesser Antilles.

Although this taxon was not collected during the surveys in Dominica in 2000s, it is considered as a part of land snail fauna of Dominica. Thirteen specimens that were part of the collection by Benjamin Sharp definitely belong to this taxon. These specimens also lend credence to the record by A. D. Brown (1881). As the species appears to be widespread in the Lesser Antilles as a result of human activities, it is quite possible that Helicina fasciata once had a population on the Dominica island; this may still be the case.
