= Omalonyx matheronii =

Scientific classification
- Kingdom: Animalia
- Phylum: Mollusca
- Class: Gastropoda
- Order: Stylommatophora
- Family: Succineidae
- Genus: Omalonyx
- Species: O. matheronii

Binomial name
- Omalonyx matheronii (Potiez & Michaud, 1838)

Synonyms
- Succinea (Omalonyx) guadaloupensis Lesson

Species of gastropod

Omalonyx matheronii is a species of air-breathing land snail, a terrestrial pulmonate gastropod mollusc in the family Succineidae, the amber snails.

== Distribution ==
The distribution of Omalonyx matheronii includes the Lesser Antilles, West Indies in Dominica (where it is introduced - there are slight differences in mantle pattern, often a diagnostic feature in some succineids, compared to typical Omalonyx matheroni),Trinidad and South America.
