= Chondropoma crenulatum =

Scientific classification
- Kingdom: Animalia
- Phylum: Mollusca
- Class: Gastropoda
- Subclass: Caenogastropoda
- Order: Littorinimorpha
- Family: Annulariidae
- Genus: Chondropoma
- Species: C. crenulatum

Binomial name
- Chondropoma crenulatum (Potiez & Michaud, 1835)

Species of gastropod

Chondropoma crenulatum (ex Diplopoma crenulatum) is a species of operculate land snail, terrestrial gastropod mollusk gastropod in the family Pomatiidae.

== Distribution ==
Distribution of Chondropoma crenulatum include:

- Saint Barthélemy.
- Saint Martin
- Antigua
- Barbuda
- Guadeloupe
- Petite Terre
- Marie-Galante
- La Désirade
- Martinica

Shells of Chondropoma sp. were also collected in Dominica.
