= Gundlachia radiata =

Scientific classification
- Kingdom: Animalia
- Phylum: Mollusca
- Class: Gastropoda
- Superorder: Hygrophila
- Family: Planorbidae
- Genus: Gundlachia
- Species: G. radiata

Binomial name
- Gundlachia radiata (Guilding, 1828)

Species of gastropod

Gundlachia radiata is a species of small freshwater snail or limpet, an aquatic pulmonate gastropod mollusk or micromollusk in the family Planorbidae.

== Distribution ==
The current distribution of G. radiata ranges from southern United States to northwestern Argentina.
