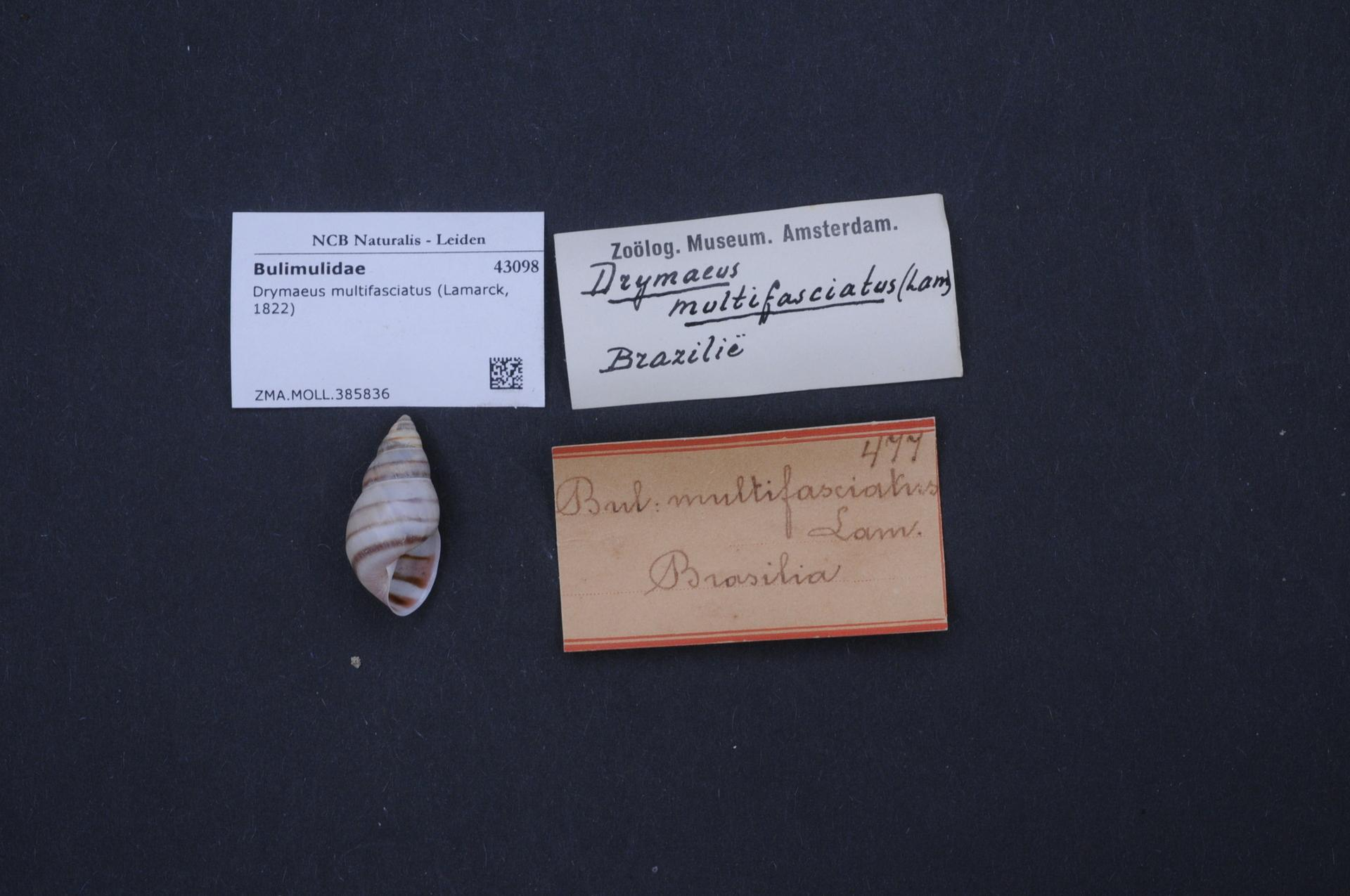
- Antidrymaeus multifasciatus specimen from Zoological Museum Amsterdam

Scientific classification
- Kingdom: Animalia
- Phylum: Mollusca
- Class: Gastropoda
- Order: Stylommatophora
- Family: Bulimulidae
- Genus: Antidrymaeus
- Species: A. multifasciatus

Binomial name
- Antidrymaeus multifasciatus (Lamarck, 1822)

Synonyms
- Bulimus multifasciatus Lamarck; Bulimus (Leiostracus) multifasciatus; Drymaeus multifasciatus

= Antidrymaeus multifasciatus =

Species of gastropod

Antidrymaeus multifasciatus is a species of tropical air-breathing land snail, a pulmonate gastropod mollusk in the family Bulimulidae.
