= List of non-marine molluscs of Trinidad and Tobago =

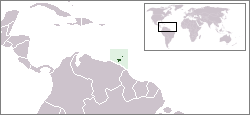
Location of Trinidad and Tobago in the Caribbean

The non-marine molluscs of the republic of Trinidad and Tobago (which comprises two West Indian islands) are a part of the molluscan fauna of Trinidad and Tobago, part of the Natural history of Trinidad and Tobago.

Starting in the 1860s, the terrestrial and freshwater molluscs of Trinidad and Tobago have been fairly well studied. Thomas Bland published the first paper mentioning terrestrial molluscs in 1861. Robert John Lechmere Guppy discovered and identified many more species from 1864 onwards, and along with Edgar Albert Smith was responsible for the earliest comprehensive species lists. The list here includes all the non-marine mollusks found in Trinidad and Tobago's ecosystem including native, introduced and invasive species alike.

== Freshwater gastropods ==
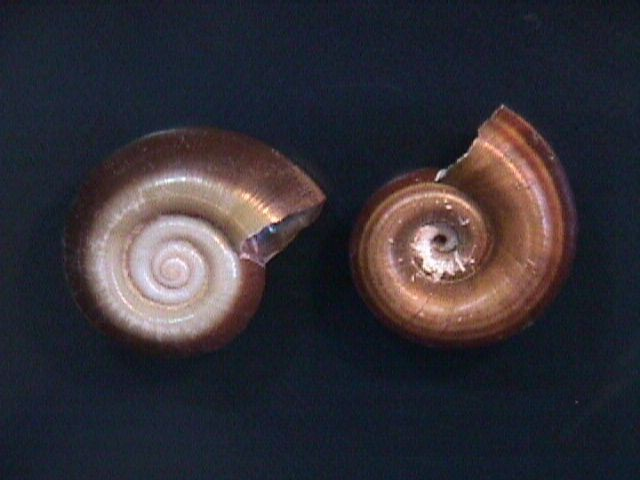
Marisa cornuarietis

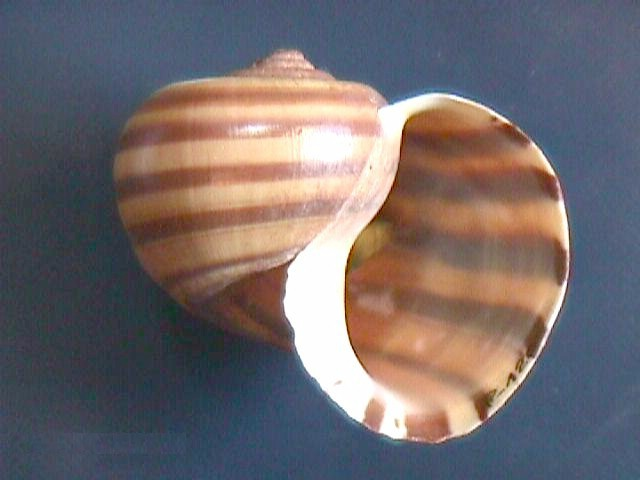
Pomacea glauca

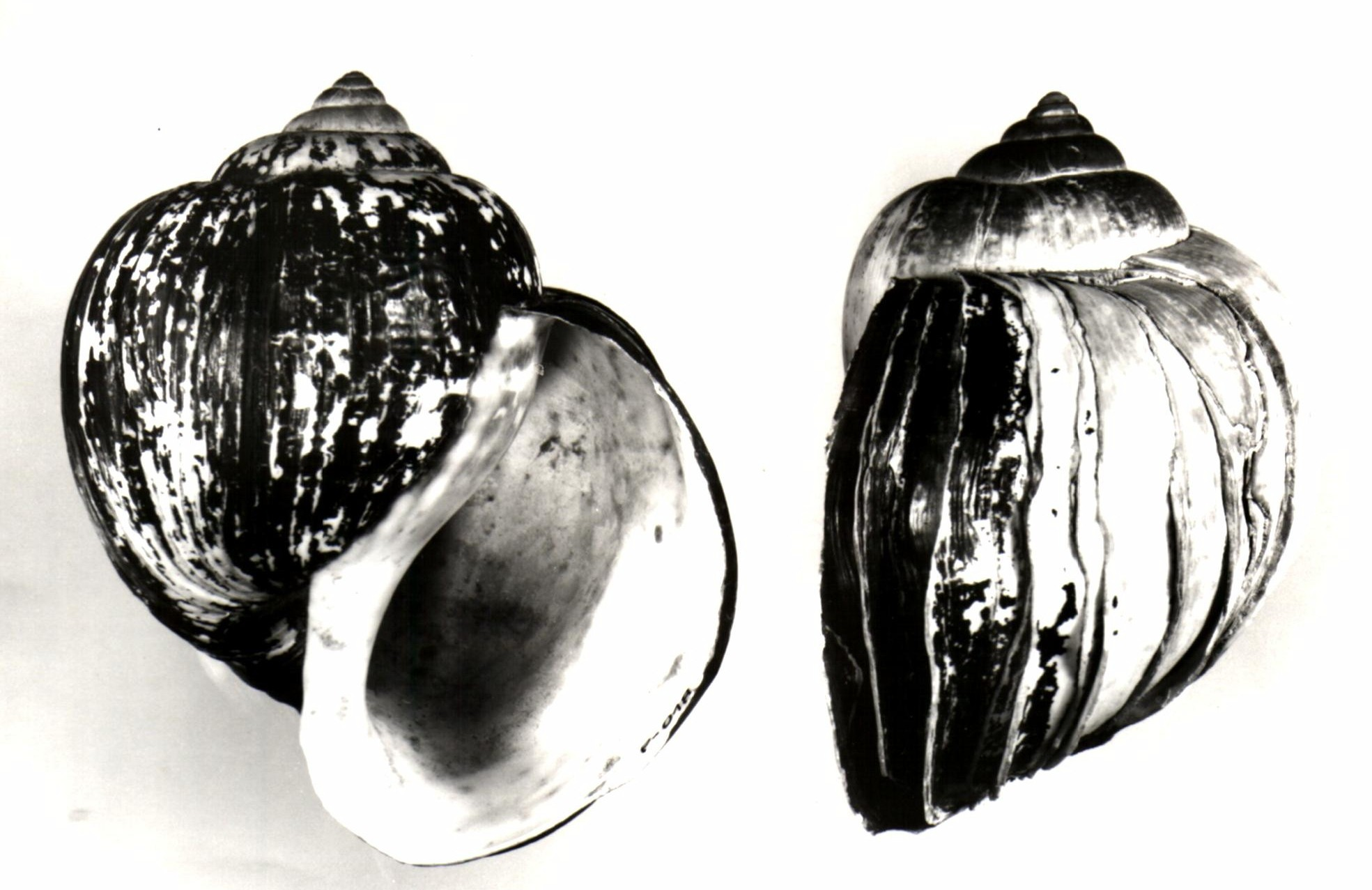
Pomacea urceus

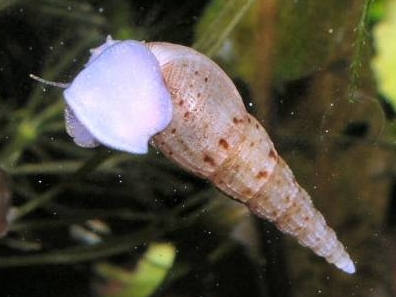
Melanoides tuberculata

Freshwater gastropods include:

Ampullariidae

- Marisa cornuarietis (Linnaeus, 1758) - Colombian ramshorn apple snail
- Pomacea glauca (Linné, 1758)
- Pomacea urceus (Müller, 1774)

Ancylidae

- Hebetancylus excentricus (Morelet, 1851) - excentric ancylid

Hydrobiidae

- Pyrgophorus parvulus (Guilding, 1828)

Physidae

- Physella cubensis (Pfeiffer, 1839)

Planorbidae

- Tropicorbis pallidus (C.B. Adams, 1846)

Thiaridae

- Melanoides tuberculata (O. F. Müller, 1774) - Malayan livebearing snail

== Land gastropods ==
Land gastropods include:

Helicinidae

- Helicina nemoralis Guppy, 1866
- Helicina dysoni (L. Pfeiffer, 1849)
- Lucidella ignicoma (Guppy, 1868) Endemic to Trinidad
- Lucidella lirata (L. Pfeiffer, 1847)

Neocyclotidae

- Aperostoma translucidum trinitense (Guppy, 1864)
- Neocyclotus rugatus (Guppy, 1864)

Diplommatinidae

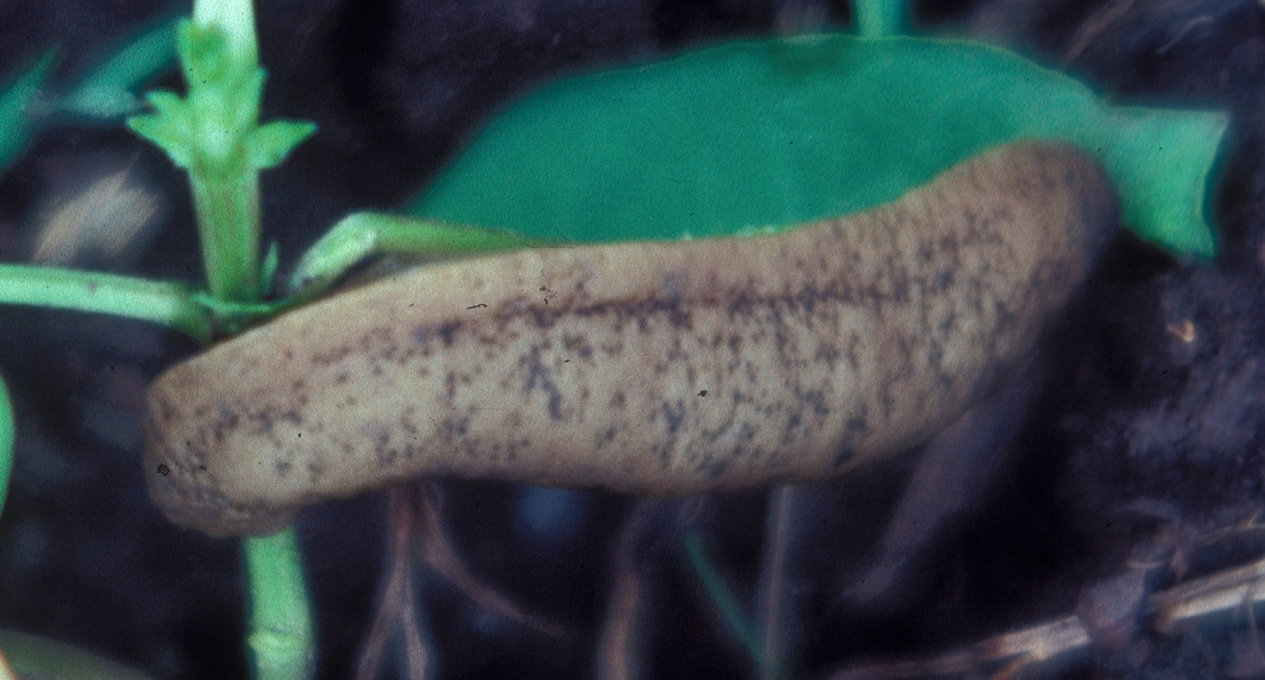
Sarasinula plebeia

- Adelopoma occidentale (Guppy, 1872)

Annulariidae

- Halotudora aripensis (Guppy, 1864) Endemic to Trinidad

Truncatellidae

- Truncatella reclusa (Guppy, 1871) Endemic to Trinidad

Veronicellidae

- Diplosolenodea bielenbergi (Semper, 1885)
- Sarasinula plebeia (Fischer, 1868) - bean slug

Achatinidae

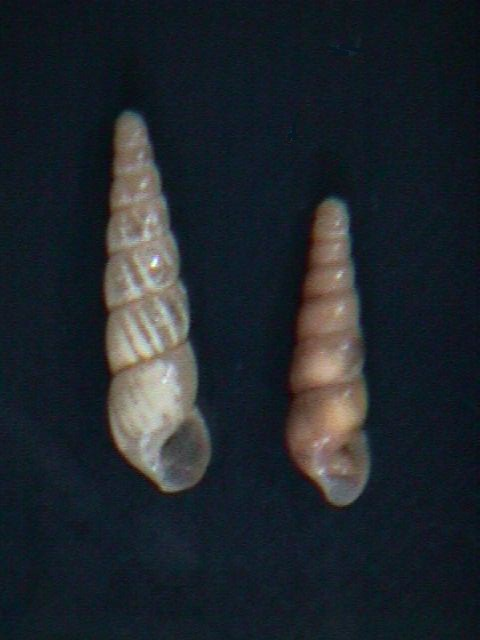
Subulina octona

- Lissachatina fulica (Bowdich, 1822) Invasive - giant African land snail
- Allopeas gracile (Hutton, 1834) - graceful awlsnail
- Allopeas micra (d’Orbigny, 1835)
- Beckianum beckianum (L. Pfeiffer, 1846)
- Leptopeas simplex (Guppy, 1868)
- Leptinaria unilamellata (d’Orbigny, 1835)
- Leptinaria urichi (E.A. Smith, 1896) Endemic to Trinidad
- Stenogyra octogyra (L. Pfeiffer, 1856)
- Subulina octona (Bruguière, 1798)

Ferussaciidae

- Karolus consobrinus (d’Orbigny, 1841)

Streptaxidae

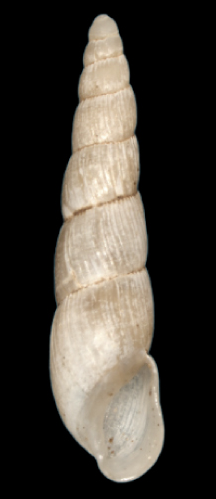
Streptostele musaecola

- Gulella bicolor (Hutton, 1834) Introduced - two-toned gulella
- Streptartemon glaber (L. Pfeiffer, 1850)
- Streptostele musaecola (Morelet, 1860) Introduced

Succineidae

- Succinea sp.
- Omalonyx unguis (d'Orbigny, 1836)

Vertiginidae

- Bothriopupa conoidea (L. Pfeiffer, 1853)
- Bothriopupa tenuidens (C.B. Adams, 1845)
- Sterkia eyriesii (Drouet, 1859)

Gastrocoptidae

- Gastrocopta barbadensis (L. Pfeiffer, 1853)
- Gastrocopta iheringi (Suter, 1900)
- Gastrocopta pellucida (L. Pfeiffer, 1840)
- Gastrocopta servilis riisei (L. Pfeiffer, 1852)
- Gastrocopta rupicola marginalba (L. Pfeiffer, 1840)
- Gastrocopta geminidens (Pilsbry, 1917)

Valloniidae

- Pupisoma dioscoricola (C. B. Adams, 1845)

Amphibulimidae

- Plekocheilus glaber (Gmelin, 1791)

Bulimulidae

- Bulimulus sp.
- Mesembrinus aureolus (Guppy, 1866) Endemic to Trinidad
- Mesembrinus broadwayi (E.A. Smith, 1896) Endemic to Trinidad
- Mesembrinus imperfectus (Guppy, 1866) Endemic to Trinidad
- Mesembrinus mossi (E.A. Smith, 1896) Endemic to Trinidad
- Mesembrinus rawsoni (Guppy, 1871) Endemic to Tobago
- Mesembrinus vincentinus (L. Pfeiffer, 1846)
- Protoglyptus pilosus (Guppy, 1871)

Orthalicidae

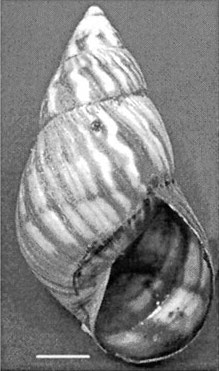
Orthalicus undatus

- Orthalicus undatus (Bruguière, 1792)

Simpulopsidae

- Simpulopsis corrugata Guppy, 1866

Urocoptidae

- Brachypodella trinitaria (L. Pfeiffer, 1860)
- Brachypodella oropuchensis Spence (Possible synonym of above)

Scolodontidae

- Happia guildingi (Bland, 1865)
- Miradiscops implicans (Guppy, 1868)
- Miradiscops lunti (E.A. Smith, 1898)
- Systrophia alicea (Guppy, 1871)
- Tamayoa decolorata (Drouët, 1859)
- Tamayoa trinitaria (E.A. Smith, 1898)

Gastrodontidae

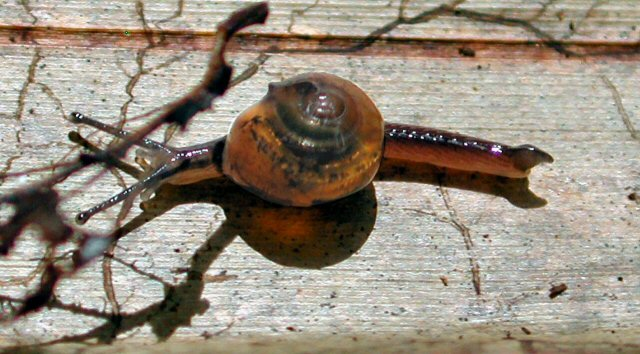
Ovachlamys fulgens

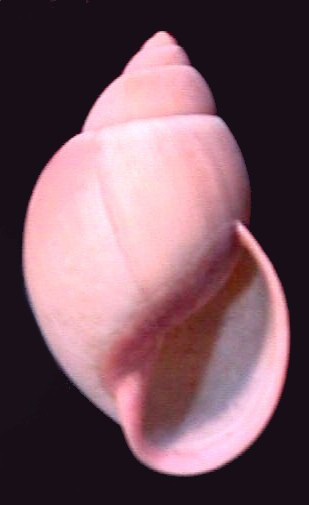
Megalobulimus oblongus

- Pseudohyalina umbratilis (Guppy, 1868)

Philomycidae

- Pallifera sp.

Euconulidae

- Guppya gundlachi (L. Pfeiffer, 1840)
- Habroconus ernsti (Jousseaume, 1889)
- Habroconus cassiquiensis (L. Pfeiffer, 1853)

Helicarionidae

- Ovachlamys fulgens (Gude, 1900) Introduced

Strophocheilidae

- Megalobulimus oblongus (Müller, 1774) - guácara
  - Megalobulimus oblongus var. tobagoensis (Pilsbry, 1895)

Charopidae

- Radioconus bactricola (Guppy, 1868)
- Radiodiscus hollidayi Rutherford, 2020

Trichodisccinidae

- Trichodiscina coactiliata (Férussac, 1838)

Thysanophoridae

- Lyroconus plagioptycha (Shuttleworth, 1854)

== Freshwater bivalves ==
Freshwater bivalves include:

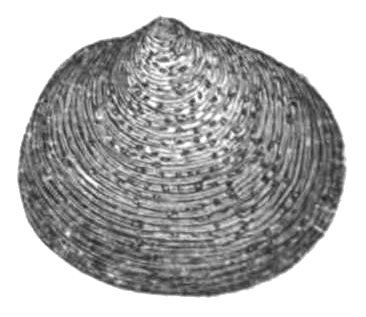
Pisidium punctiferum

Mycetopodidae

- Anodontites leotaudi (Guppy, 1864)
- Mycetopoda siliquosa (Spix, 1827)

Sphaeriidae (=Pisidiidae)

- Pisidium punctiferum (Guppy, 1867) - striate peaclam
- Eupera cubensis (Prime, 1865)

== See also ==
Lists of non-marine molluscs of nearby countries and islands:

- List of non-marine molluscs of Venezuela
- List of non-marine molluscs of Grenada
- List of non-marine molluscs of Barbados
- List of non-marine molluscs of Curaçao
- List of non-marine molluscs of Aruba
- List of non-marine molluscs of Guyana
