= List of non-marine molluscs of Venezuela =

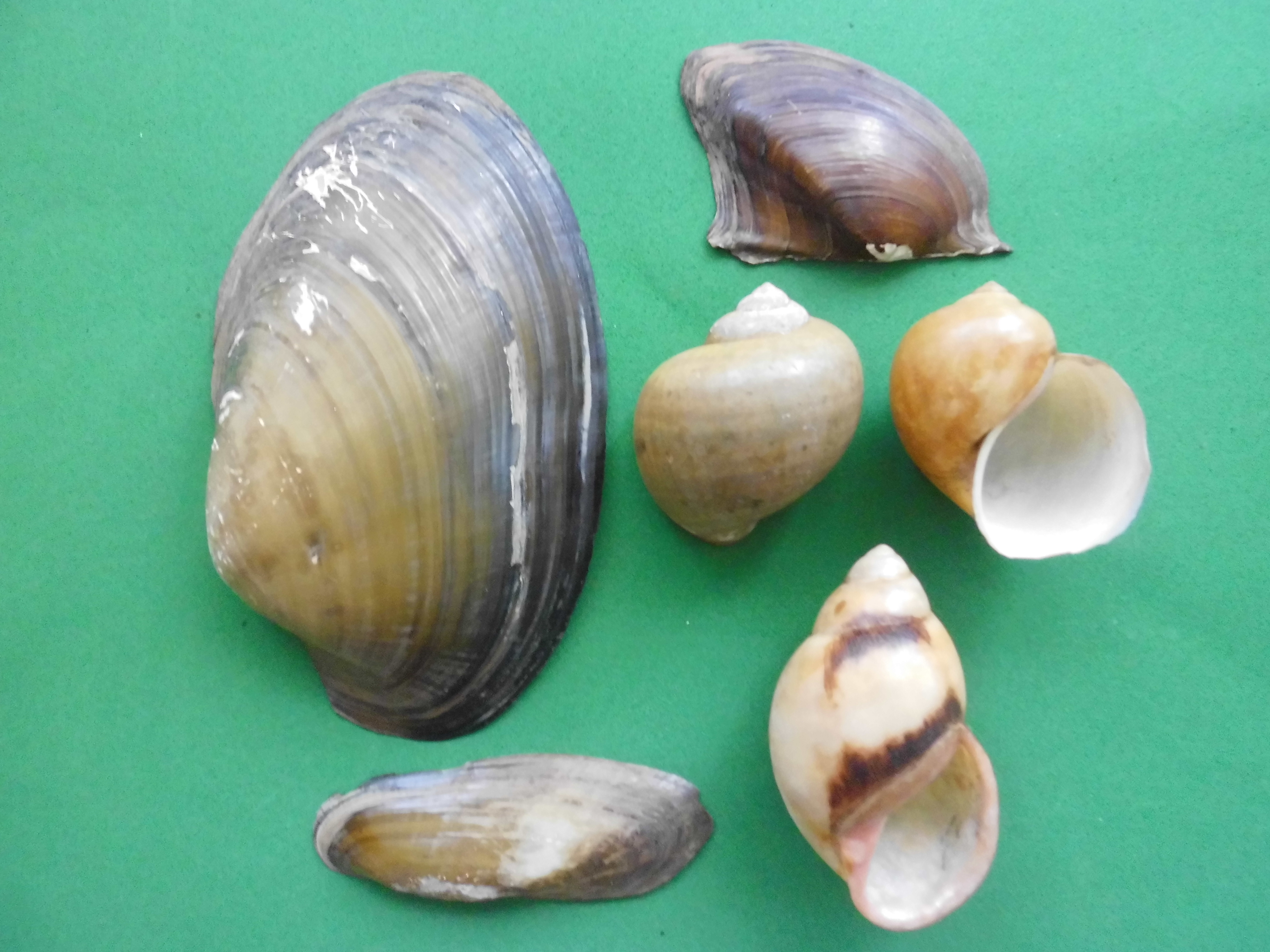
Shells of non marine molluscs from Venezuela. Bivalves: Anodontites trapesalis; Paxyodon syrmatophorus; Mycetopoda pittieri. Gastropods: Pomacea doliodes; Megalobulimus oblongus.

Location of Venezuela

The non-marine molluscs of Venezuela are a part of the molluscan fauna of Venezuela (which is part of the wildlife of Venezuela). Non-marine molluscs are the snails, clams, and mussels that live in freshwater habitats, and the snails and slugs that live on land. Sea-dwelling molluscs are not included in this list.

A number of species of non-marine molluscs are found in the wild in Venezuela.

== Historical background ==
Studies on the knowledge of the Venezuelan malacofauna begin in the nineteenth century with the work of German malacologist Eduard von Martens around 1873 who published the first list of the mollusks Venezuela. Three years later, the German-Venezuelan Adolfo Ernst, taking as its starting point and extending Martens' list, published a second list in 1876. Subsequent to these two pioneering nineteenth century works, only sporadic descriptions were published in foreign publications. It took about half a century for new listings of malacofauna of Venezuela to be published, this time by American H. B. Baker in the mid-1920s.

Following Baker's work is beginning to make as many Venezuelan species descriptions and numerous national and regional listings, including: Adolfo Lutz, who in 1928 listed and made observations on malacofauna of Valencia Lake and surrounding areas; H. Richards, G. Hummelinck, & P. W. Malacofauna 1940 describing the island of Margarita; Arias in 1952 and 1953, in which he describes the fauna of the regions of Baruta, El Hatillo and Perija region; Thompson, who in 1957 described the shellfish of National Park Henri Pittier and surrounding areas; Martinez and Miranda in 1968 who described pulmonate molluscs of Caracas and surrounding areas; Fernández in 1982, who describes sitecueros of slugs and Venezuela; Martinez et al. in 2004 who described freshwater bivalve fauna of Venezuela ; and Lasso and collaborators in 2009, who described the fauna of the basin of the Orinoco.

== Diversity ==
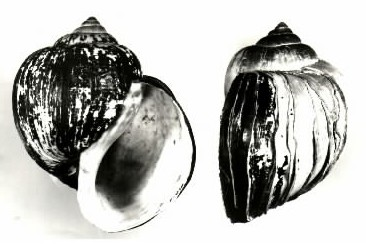
Pomacea urceus family Ampullariidae member, one of the most diverse

The non-marine molluscs of Venezuela are composed of classes Gastropoda and Bivalvia.

The freshwater gastropod families with the greatest number of species are Ampullariidae (35 spp.) and Planorbidae (15 spp.). Terrestrial gastropod families include Ortalicidae (35 spp.) and Subulinidae (16 spp.).

Among the bivalve families with the most species are Mycetopodidade (17 spp.) and Hyriidae (10 spp.)

Regarding introduced species, the largest number of species is between terrestrial mollusks, primarily on families Subulinidae (6 spp.), Limacidae (4 spp.), and Helicidae (3 spp.)

== Distribution ==
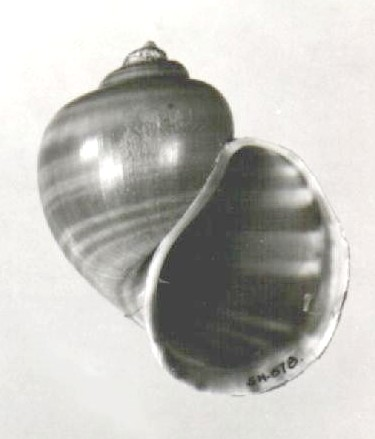
Pomacea dolioides

The Venezuelan non-marine malacofauna are distributed throughout the entire Venezuelan territory, but the greatest number of species and greatest distribution has been reported for the river basin Orinoco. The vast majority of species live in calm water, pipes, or flooded rivers and lakes. Many of the species have local distributions such as slugs and seven of leathers that often live primarily in the areas of cultivation in the north and the Andean region, However, very widely distributed species that can be located throughout the country as in the case of molluscs Ampullariidae amphibians and within the family which include Marisa cornuarietis, Pomacea urceus (Guarura), Pomacea glauca, Pomacea dolioides. Among the highlights is Megalobulimus oblongus (Guacara).

In relation to introduced species is noteworthy that some of it was spread widely by middle natural environment among them are: Achatina fulica (Giant African Snail), Arion subfuscus Subulina octona, and Thiara granifera Melanoides tuberculata.

== List of non-marine molluscs of Venezuela ==
The list of non-marine molluscs of Venezuela consists of:

- Freshwater gastropods: 9 families, 19 genera, 82 species.
- Terrestrial gastropods: 26 families, 58 genera, 116 species.
- Freshwater bivalves: 5 families, 11 genera, 31 species.

In total, 30 families, 88 genera, and 229 species are listed.

=== Freshwater gastropods ===
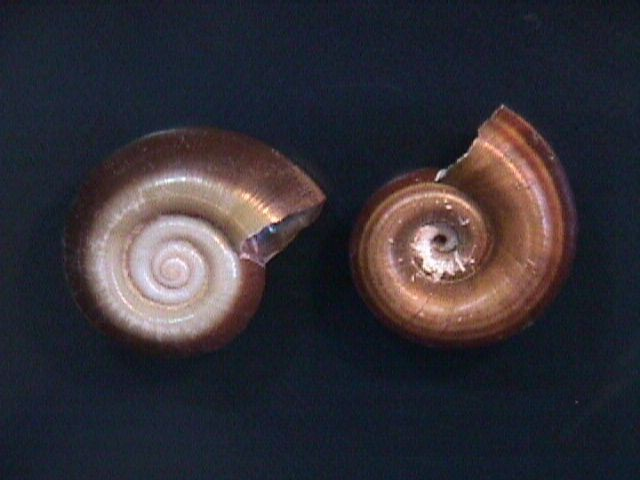
Two shells of Marisa cornuarietis

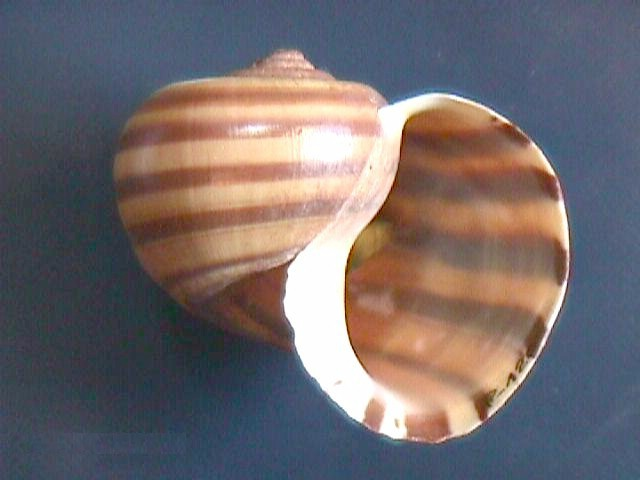
A shell of Pomacea glauca

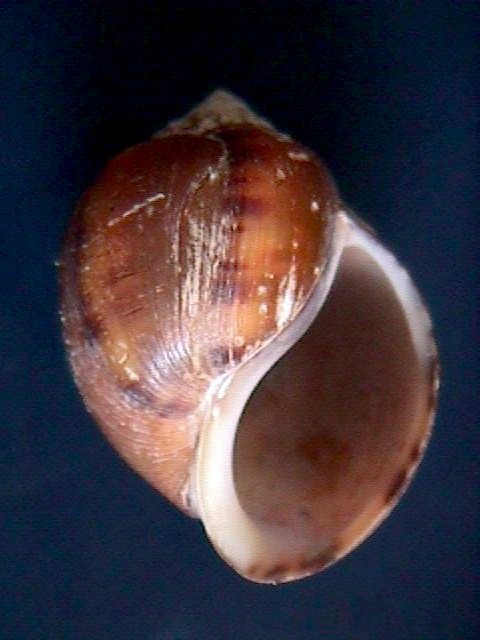
A shell of Pomacea interrupta

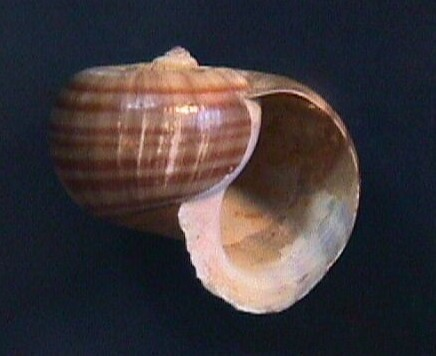
A shell of Pomacea glauca orinocensis

Freshwater gastropods include:

Family Ampullariidae

- Asolene crassa (Swainson, 1823)
- Marisa cornuarietis (Linnaeus, 1758) - Colombian ramshorn apple snail
- Pomacea amazonica (Revee, 1856) - island apple snail
- Pomacea aurostoma (Lea, 1856)
- Pomacea avellana (Sowerby, 1909)
- Pomacea bridgesii (Reeve, 1856) - spike-topped apple snail (introduced species)
- Pomacea camena (Pain, 1956)
- Pomacea canaliculata (Lamarck, 1819) - golden apple snail (introduced species)
- Pomacea chemnitzii (Philippi, 1887)
- Pomacea cingulata (Philippi, 1851)
- Pomacea crassa (Swainson, 1823)
- Pomacea dolioides (Revee, 1856)
- Pomacea eximia (Dunker, 1853)
- Pomacea falconensis Pain y Arias, 1958
- Pomacea glauca (Linnaeus, 1758)
  - Pomacea glauca crocostoma (Philippi, 1852)
  - Pomacea glauca gevesensis (Deshayes, 1801)
  - Pomacea glauca luteostoma (Swainson, 1822 )
  - Pomacea glauca orinocensis (Troschel, 1848)
- Pomacea haustrum (Revee, 1856) - titan apple snail
- Pomacea interrupta (Sowerby, 1909)
- Pomacea lineata (Spix, 1827)
- Pomacea minuscula Baker 1930
- Pomacea nobilis (Revee, 1856)
- Pomacea oblonga (Swainson, 1823)
- Pomacea papyracea (Spix, 1827)
- Pomacea patula (Revee, 1856)
- Pomacea semitecta (Mousson, 1873)
- Pomacea superba (Marshall, 1928)
- Pomacea swainsoni (Revee, 1856)
- Pomacea tamsiana (Philippi, 1852)
- Pomacea urceus (Müller, 1774)
  - Pomacea urceus guyanensis (Lamarck, 1810)
  - Pomacea urceus olivacea (Spix, 1827)
- Pomacea vexillum (Revee, 1856)

Family Ancylidae

- Gundlachia saulcyana (Bourguignat, 1853)
- Hebetancylus moricandi (D’Orbigny, 1837)

Family Hydrobiidae

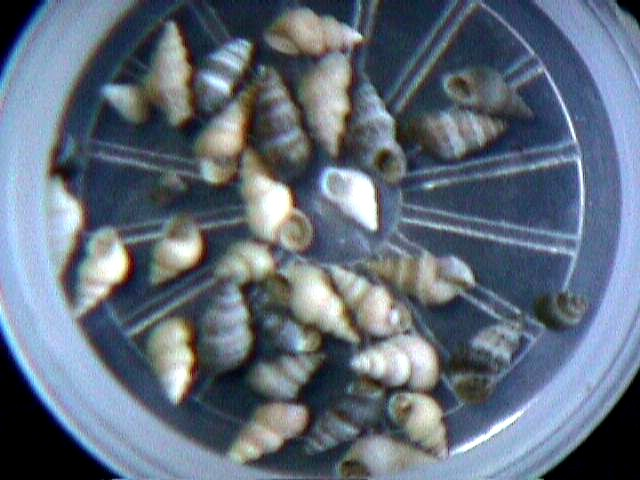
Over 30 individuals of Pyrgophorus coronatus

- Pyrgophorus coronatus (Pfeiffer, 1840)
- Pyrgophorus ernesti (Martens, 1873)
- Pyrgophorus globulus (Baker, 1930)
- Pyrgophorus parvulus (Guilding, 1828)
- Pyrgophorus putialis (Baker, 1930)
- Pyrgophorus platyrachis Thompson, 1968

Family Lymnaeidae

- Lymnaea meridensis Bargues, Artigas & Mas-Coma, 2011 - synonym: Galba cousini (Jousseaume, 1887) hitherto known from Venezuelan highlands - native
- Galba neotropica (Bargues, Artigas, Mera y Sierra, Pointier & Mas-Coma, 2007) (native)
- Galba cubensis (Pfeiffer, 1839) (introduced from the Caribbean area)
- Pseudosuccinea columella (Say, 1817) - American ribbed fluke snail (introduced from the Caribbean area)
- Galba truncatula (O. F. Müller, 1774) (introduced from the Old World)
- Galba viatrix (D’Orbigny, 1835) (from Venezuela was identified as Galba truncatula)
- Galba schirazensis (Küster, 1862) (introduced from the Old World)

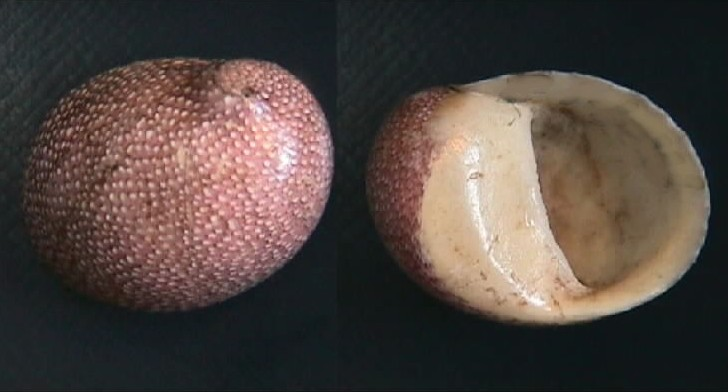
Two shells of Neritina puncticulata

Family Neritidae

- Neritina meleagris (Lamarck, 1822)
- Neritina piratica Russell, 1943
- Neritina punctulata (Lamarck, 1816)
- Neritina reclivata (Say, 1822)
- Neritina virginea (Linnaeus 1758) - virgin nerite

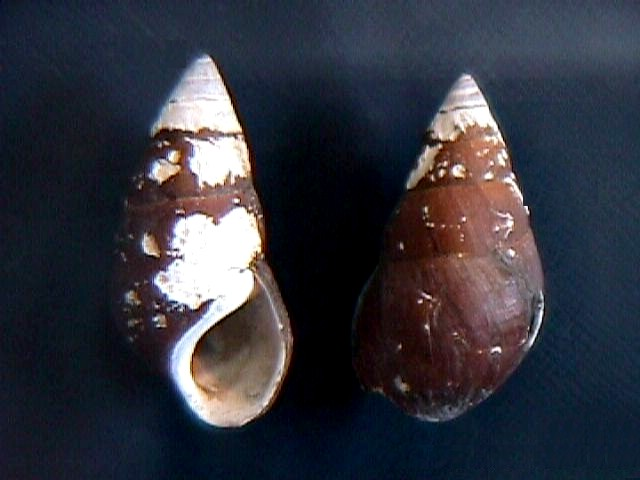
Two shells of Pachychilus laevissimus

Family Pachychilidae

- Doryssa atra (Bruguièri, 1792)
- Doryssa consolidata (Bruguièri, 1789)
- Doryssa grunei (Jonas, 1844)
- Doryssa lamarckiana (Brot, 1870)
- Doryssa hohenackeri (Philippi, 1851)
- Doryssa kappleri (Vernhout, 1914)
- Doryssa transversa (Lea, 1850)
- Pachychilus laevissimus (Sowerby, 1824)

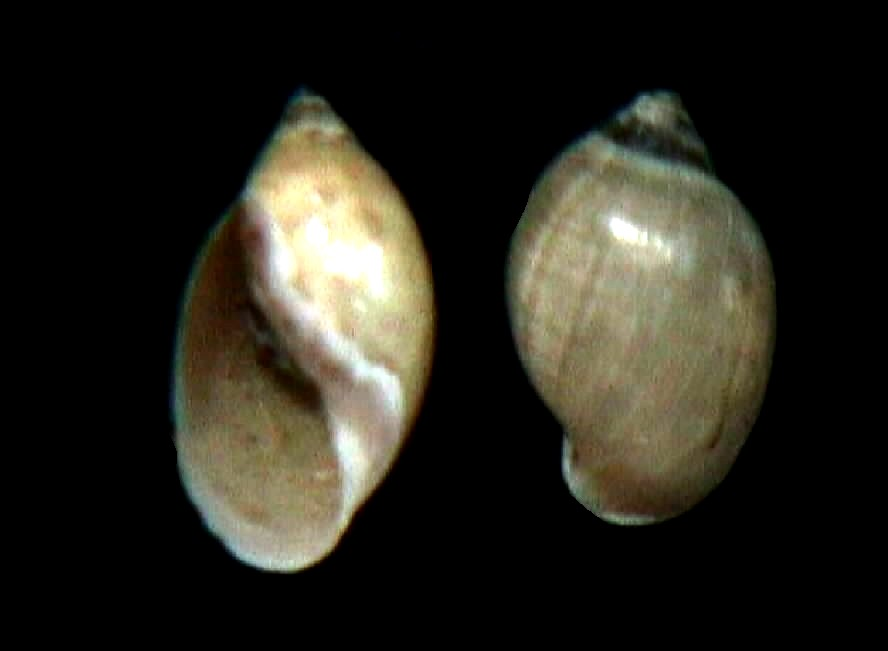
Two shells of Aplexa rivalis

Family Physidae

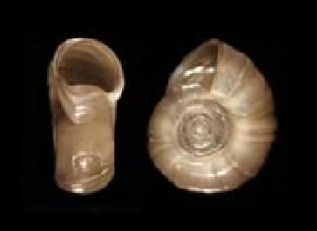
Two views of a shell of Planorbella duryi

- Aplexa rivalis (Manton & Rackett, 1807)
- Stenophysa acuminata (Gray & Sowerby, 1873)

Family Planorbidae

- Biomphalaria glabrata (Say, 1818)
- Biomphalaria havanensis (Dunker, 1850) - ghost rams-horn
- Biomphalaria kuhniana (Clessin, 1883)
- Biomphalaria peregrina (D’Orbigny, 1835)
- Bionphalaria pronum (Von Martens 1873)
- Biomphalaria straminea (Dunker, 1848)
- Biomphalaria tenagophila (D’Orbigny, 1835)
- Drepanotrema anatinum (D’Orbigny, 1835)
- Drepanotrema cimex (Moricand, 1839) - ridged ramshorn
- Drepanotrema depressissmum (Moricand, 1839)
- Drepanotrema kermatoides (D’Orbigny, 1835)
- Drepanotrema lucidum (Pfeiffer, 1839)
- Drepanotrema surinamensis (Dunker & Clessin, 1884)

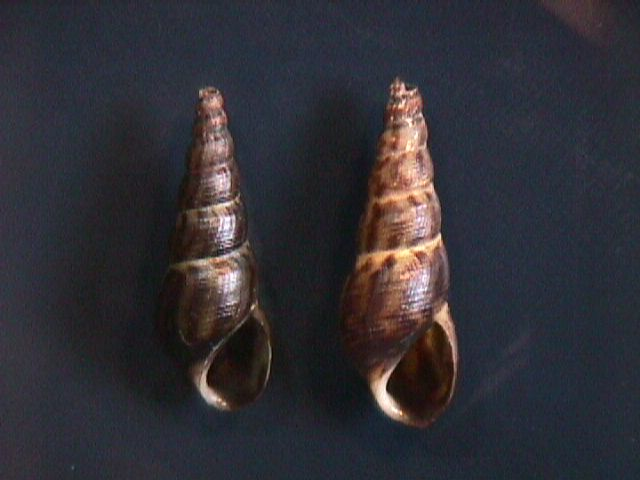
Two shells of Melanoides tuberculata

- Planorbella duryi (Wetherby 1879) - Seminole rams-horn (introduced species)
- Planorbis circumlineatus Shuttleworth, 1854

Family Thiaridae

- Aylacostoma lineolata (Gray, 1828)
- Aylacostoma stringillata (Dumker, 1843)
- Aylacostoma venezuelensis (Dumker & Revee, 1859)
- Melanoides tuberculata (Müller, 1774) - red-rimmed melania (introduced species)
- Thiara granifera (Lamarck, 1822) - quilted melania (introduced species)

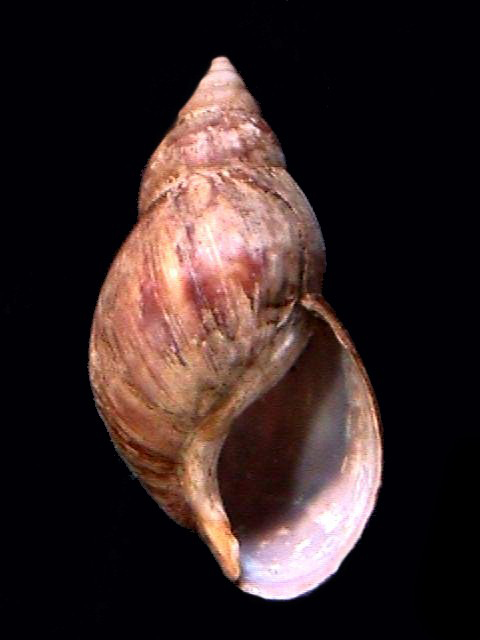
A shell of Achatina fulica

=== Land gastropods ===
Land gastropods include:

Family Achatinidae

- Achatina fulica (Bowdich, 1822) - giant African land snail (introduced species)

Family Arionidae

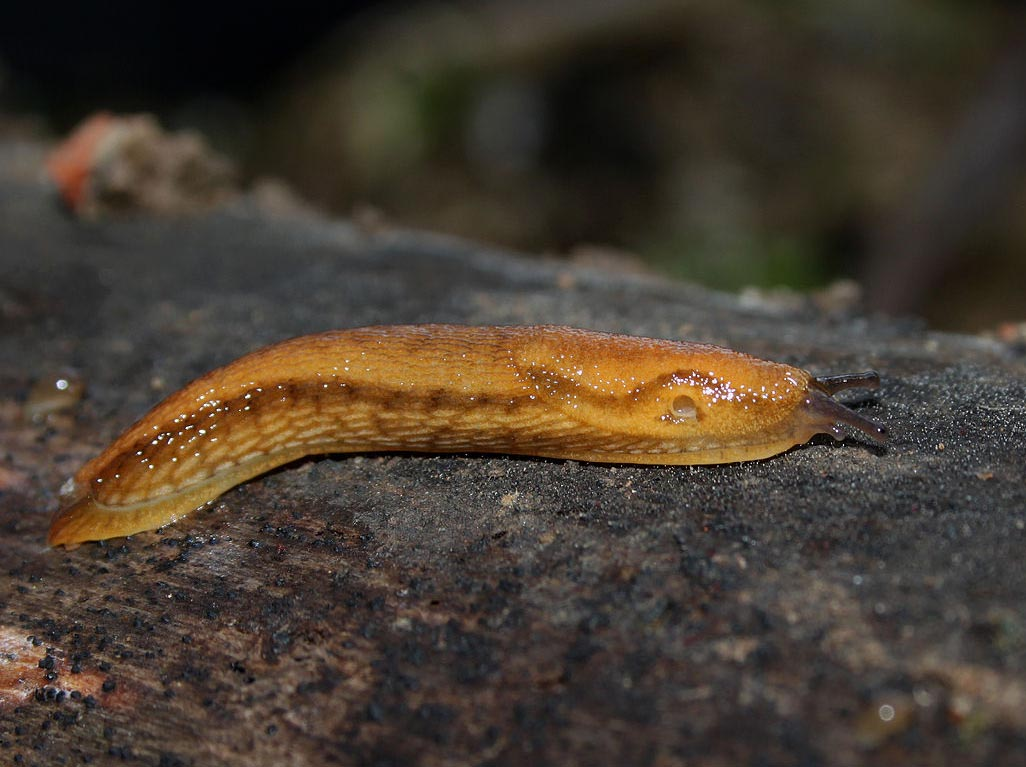
An active individual of Arion subfuscus

- Arion subfuscus (Draparnaud, 1805) (introduced species)

Family Bradybaenidae

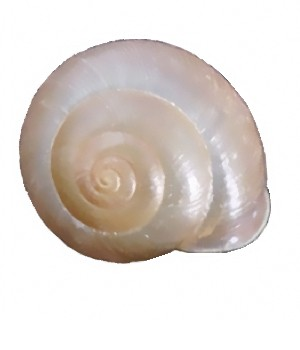
A shell of Bradybaena similaris

- Bradybaena similaris (Fèrussac, 1821) - Asian trampsnail (introduced species)

Family Clausiliidae

- Bequaertinenia bequaerti (Arias, 1953)
- Columbina cyclostoma (Pfeiffer, 1849)
- Gonionenia dohrni (Pfeiffer, 1860)
- Nenia geayi (Jousseaume, 1849)

Family Euconulidae

- Guppya gundlachi (Pfeiffer)
- Habroconus cassiquiensis (Pfeiffer, 1853)
- Habroconus ernsti (Jousseaume)

Family Ferussaciidae

- Cecilioides acicula (Müller 1774) - blind awlsnail (introduced species)
- Cecilioides aperta (Swainson, 1840) (introduced species)
- Cecilioides consobrina (d’Orbigny, 1842)

Family Helicidae

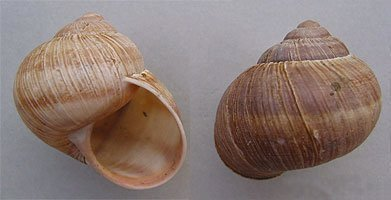
Two shells of Helix pomatia

- Cornu aspersum = Helix aspersa (Müller, 1774) - garden snail (introduced species)
- Helix pomatia Linnaeus, 1758 - Roman snail (introduced species)
- Theba pisana (Müller, 1774) - white garden snail (introduced species)

Family Helicinidae

- Helicina microdina (Morelet, 1854)
  - Helicina microdina huberi Breure, 1976

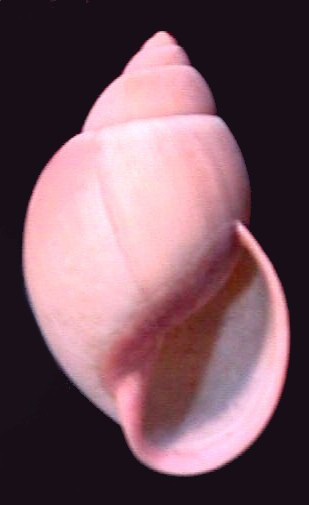
A shell of Megalobulimus oblongus

- Helicina tamsiana (Pfeiffer, 1850)
  - Helicina tamsiana appuni (Von Marten, 1873)

Family Limacidae

- Agriolimax laevis (Müller, 1774) (introduced species)
- Deroceras reticulatum (Müller, 1774) - grey field slug (introduced species)
- Lehmannia valentiana (Férussac, 1822) (introduced species)
- Milax gagates (Draparnaud) - greenhouse slug (introduced species)

Family Strophocheilidae

- Megalobulimus oblongus (Müller, 1774)

Family Neocyclotidae

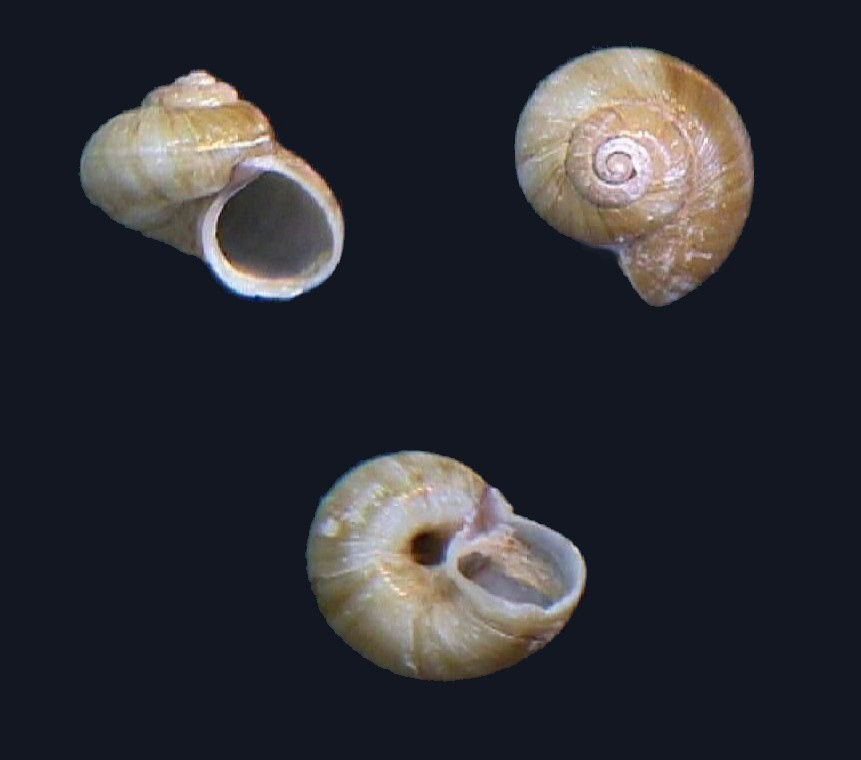
Three views of a shell of Poteria translucida

- Incidostoma nanun (Bartsch & Morrison, 1942)
- Poteria fasciatum (Kobelt & Schwanheim, 1912)
- Poteria translucida (Sowerby, 1843)

Family Amphibulimidae

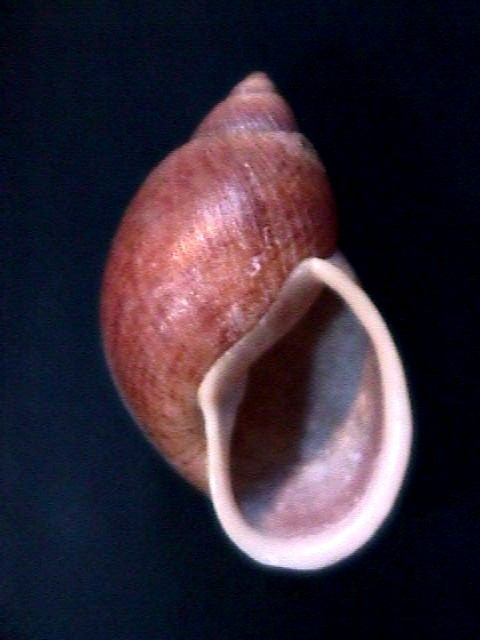
A shell of Dryptus marmoratus

- Dryptus marmoratus (Dunker, 1844)
- Plekocheilus blainvilleanus (Pfeiffer, 1848)
- Plekocheilus breweri Breure & Schlögl, 2010
- Plekocheilus coloratus (Nyst, 1845)
- Plekocheilus gibber (Oberwimmer, 1931)
- Plekocheilus huberi Breure, 2009
- Plekocheilus nebulosus Breure, 2009
- Plekocheilus pardalis (Férrusac, 1821)
- Plekocheilus sophiae Breure, 2009
- Plekocheilus tatei Haas, 1955
- Plekocheilus tepuiensis Breure, 2009
- Plekocheilus veranyi (Pfeiffer, 1847)
- Plekocheilus vlceki Breure & Schlögl, 2010
- Eudolichotis aurissciuri (Guppy, 1866)
- Eudolichotis distorta (Bruguière)
- Eudolichotis euryomphala (Jonas, 1844)

Family Orthalicidae

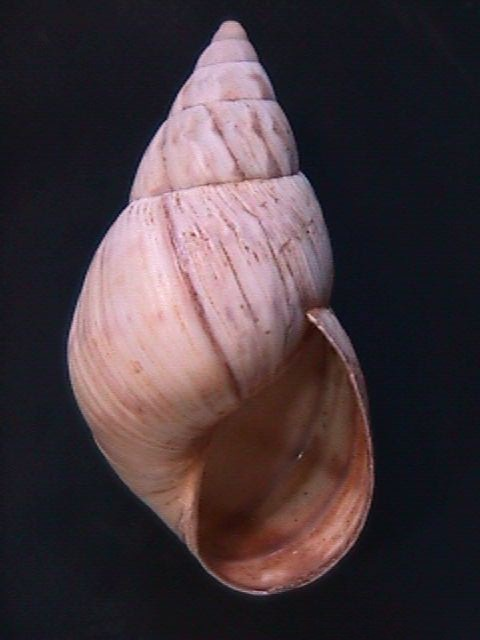
A shell of Oxistila maracaibensis

- Auris sinuata (Albers, 1854)
- Oxystyla abducta (Shuttleworth, 1856)
- Oxystyla maracaibensis (Pfeiffer, 1899)

Family Bulimulidae

- Bulimulus dysoni Pfeiffer
- Bulimulus cacticolus Reeve
- Bulimulus constrictus Pfeiffer
- Bulimulus krebsianus Pilsbry, 1897
- Drymaeus extraneus (Haas, 1955) - synonym: Drymaeus griffini Haas, 1955
- Drymaeus grandensis (Pfeiffer, 1847)
- Drymaeus imperfectus (Guppy, 1866)
- Drymaeus meridanus (Pfeiffer)
- Drymaeus multilineatus (Say, 1825) - lined treesnail
- Drymaeus rex Breure, 2009
- Drymaeus ruthveni Baker, 1926
- Drymaeus trigonostomus (Jonas, 1844)
  - Drymaeus trigonostomus knorri (Pfeiffer, 1846)
- Drymaeus virgulatus (Férussac)

Family Simpulopsidae

- Simpulopsis magnus gg

Family Odontostomidae

- Tomigerus cumingi Pfeiffer

Family Pleurodontidae

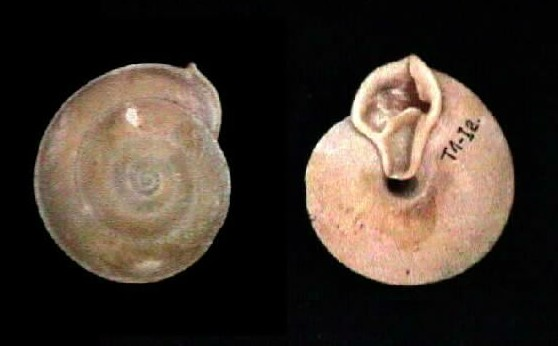
Two shells of Labyrinthus leucodon

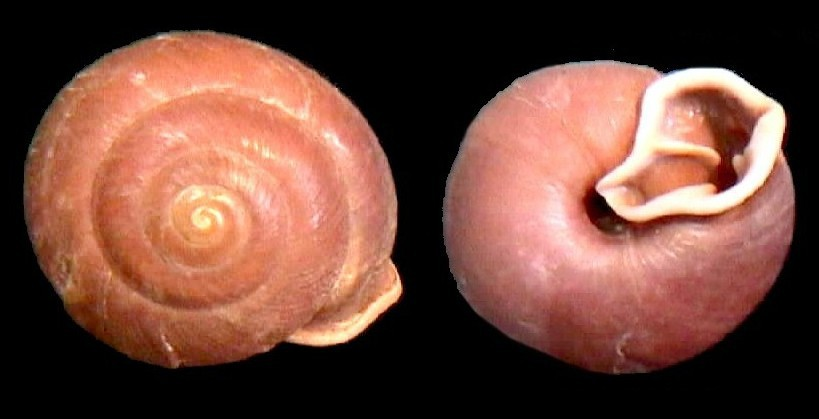
Two shells of Labyrinthus plicatus

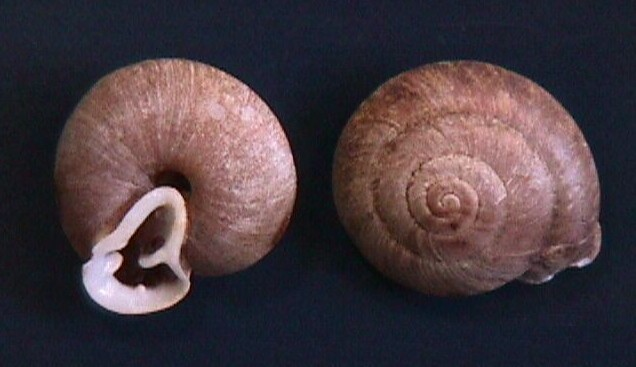
Two shells of Labyrinthus umbrus

- Labyrinthus leucodon (Pfeiffer, 1847)
- Labyrinthus plicatus (Born, 1780)
- Labyrinthus tamsiana (Dunker, 1847) )
- Labyrinthus umbrus (Thompson, 1957)
- Solaropsis venezuelensis Preston, 1909

Family Pupillidae

- Pupoides marginatus nitidulus (Pfeiffer, 1839)
- Bothriopupa tenuidens (Adams)

Family Sagdidae

- Xenodiscula venezuelensis Pilsbry, 1919

Family Scolodontidae

- Systrophia starkii (H. B. Baker)

Family Systrophiidae

- Drepanostomella pinchoti Pilsbry, 1930

Family Spiraxidae

- Pseudosubulina decussata Baker, 1926
- Pseudosubulina chaperi (Jousseaume 1889)
- Spiraxis blandi (Crosse, 1874)

Family Streptaxidae

- Gulella bicolor (Hutton, 1834) - two-toned gulella (introduced species)
- Streptaxis glaber Pfeiffer

Family Subulinidae

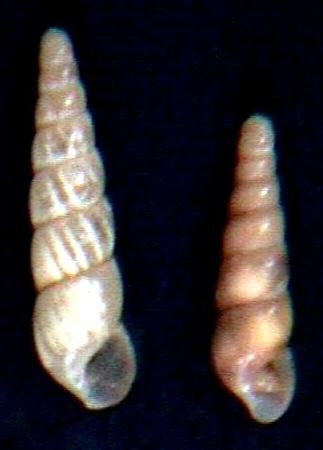
An empty shell and a whole but retracted individual of Subulina octona

- Allopeas gracile (Hutton, 1834) - graceful awlsnail
- Allopeas micra (d’Orbigny, 1835) (introduced species)
- Beckianum beckianum (L. Pfeiffer, 1846)
- Dysopeas subopacum (Baker, 1927)
- Dysopeas translucidum (Baker, 1927)
- Lamellaxis martensiana (Baker, 1927)
- Lamellaxis mauritianus (Pfeiffer, 1952) (introduced species)
- Lamellaxis pachyspira Pilsbry 1905
- Leptinaria unilamellata (D’Orbigny, 1837)
- Leptopeas venezuelensis (Pfeiffer, 1856)
- Obeliscus octogyrus (Pfeiffer, 1850)
- Obeliscus rectus Baker, 1927
- Opeas gracile (Hutton, 1834) (introduced species)
- Opeas pellucidum (Pfeiffer, 1847)
- Opeas pumilum (Pfeiffer, 1847) - dwarf awlsnail (introduced species)
- Opeas pyrgula Schmacker and Boettger, 1891 (introduced species)
- Subulina octona (Bruguière, 1798) (introduced species)
- Subulina striatella (Rang, 1831) (introduced species)

Family Succineidae

- Omalonyx felina Guppy 1878
- Omalonyx pattersonae Tillier, 1891
- Succinea tamsiana Pfeiffer

Family Thysanophoridae

- Thysanophora canalis (Pilsbry, 1910)
- Thysanophora plagiptycha (Shuttleworth, 1854)
- Thysanophora satanaensis (Pfeiffer, 1854)

Family Urocoptidae

- Brachypodella hanleyana (Pfeiffer, 1847)
- Brachypodella leucopleura (Menke, 1847)
- Brachypodella nidicostata Spence, 1920

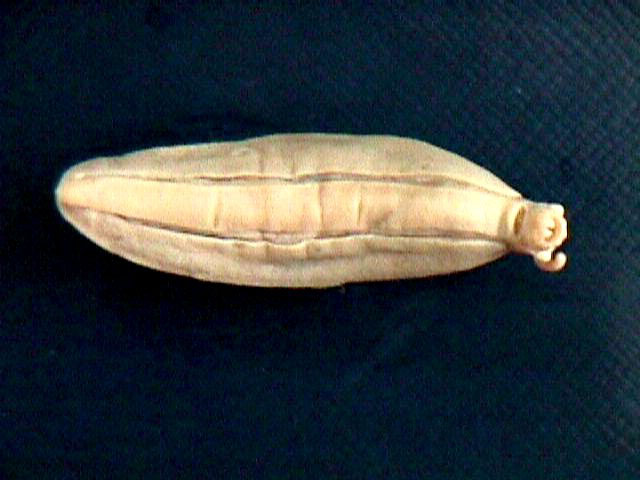
A preserved specimen of Diplosolenodes occidentalis

Family Veronicellidae

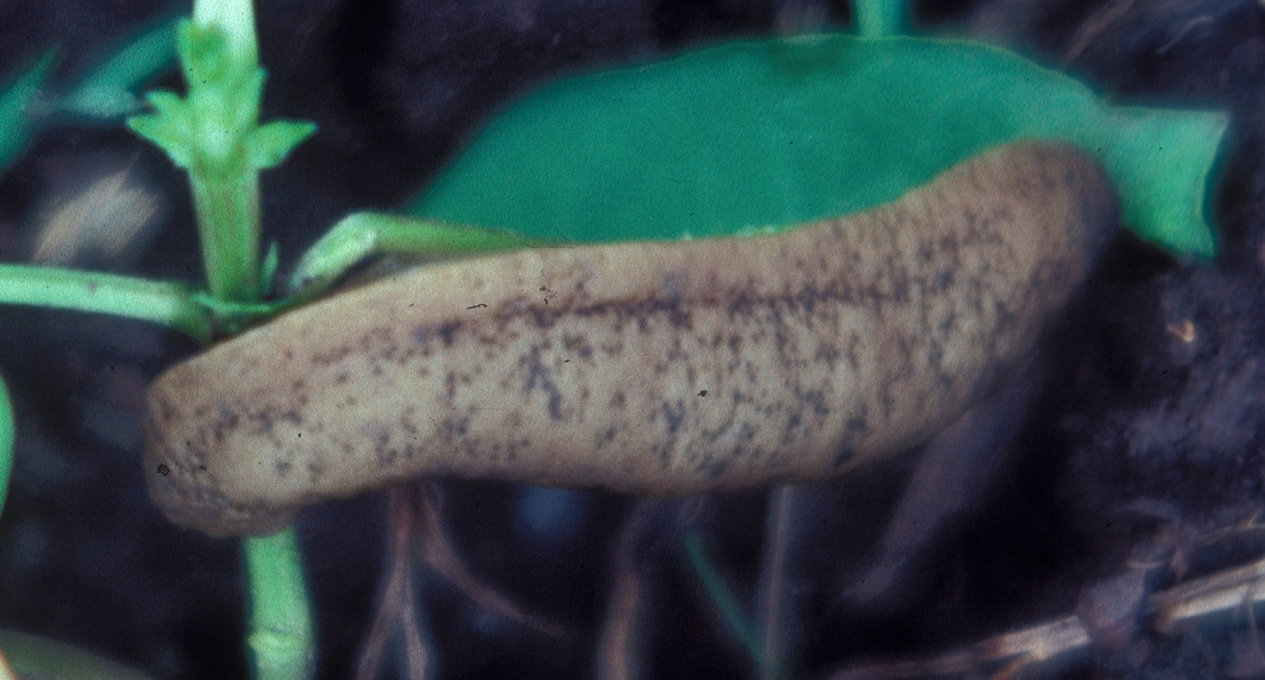
A live individual of Sarasinula plebeia

- Diplosolenodes occidentalis (Guilding, 1825)
- Diplosolenodes bielenbergii (Semper, 1885)
- Forcatulus coerulescens (Semper, 1885)
- Latipes pterocaulis (Simroth, 1914)
- Microveronicella diminuta (Simroth, 1914)
- Sarasinula linguaeformis (Semper, 1885)
- Sarasinula plebeia (Fischer, 1868)

Family Vertiginidae

- Gastrocopta barbadensis (Pfeiffer, 1853)
- Gastrocopta iheringi (Suter, 1900)
- Gastrocopta geminidens (Pilsbry)

Family Xanthonychidae

- Averellia coactiliata (Férrussac, 1838)

=== Freshwater bivalves ===
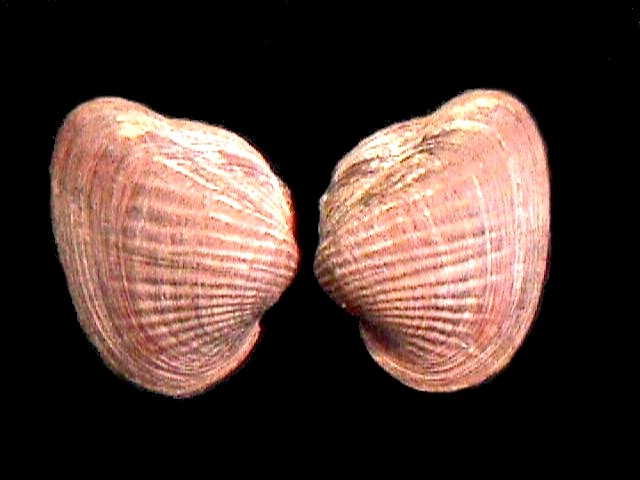
A whole shell of Castalia schombergiana

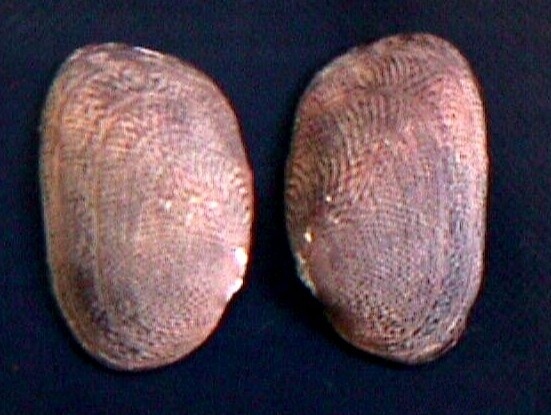
A whole shell of Diplodon granosus

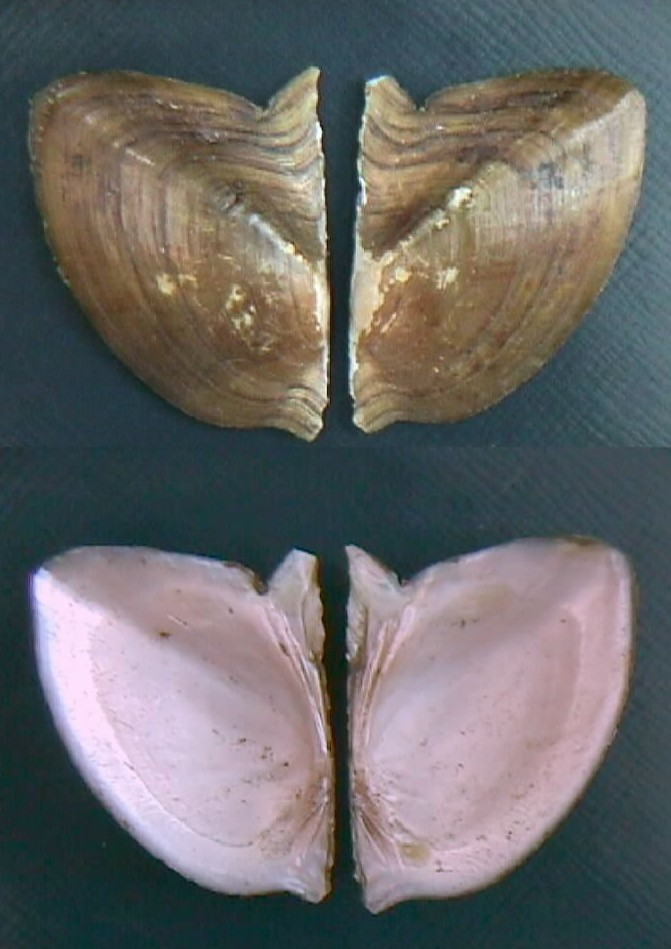
Two whole shells of Paxydon syrmatophorus

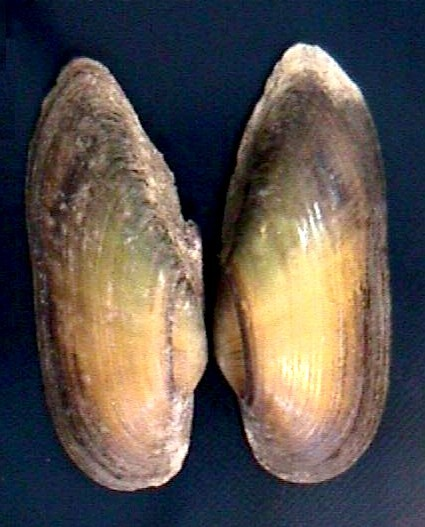
A whole shell of Tamsiella tamsiana

Family Corbiculidae

- Corbicula fluminalis (Múller, 1774) (introduced species)

Family Corbulidae

- Cyanocyclas cuneata Say, 1822

Family Hyriidae

- Castalia ambigua Lamarck, 1819
- Castalia orinocensis Morrison, 1943
- Castalia schombergiana Sowerby, 1869
- Castalia stevensi (Baker, 1930)
- Dilodon granosus Bruguiere, 1782
- Dilodon losadae Haas, 1819
- Dilodon flucki Morrison 1943
- Paxyodon syrmatophorus Meuschen, 1781
- Prisodon obliquus (Schumacher, 1871)
- Triplodon stevensii Lea, 1871

Family Mycetopodidae

- Anodontites crispatus Bruguiere, 1792
- Anodontites elongatus (Swainson, 1823)
- Anodontites ensiformes (Spix, 1827)
- Anodontites guanarensis Marshall, 1928
- Anodontites infossa Baker, 1930
- Anodontites pittieri Marshall, 1922
- Anodontites schombergianus Sowerby, 1870
- Anodontites leotaudi (Guppy, 1866)
- Anodontites tenebricosus D’Orbigny, 1835
- Anodontites tortilis (Lea, 1852)
- Anodontites trapezeus (Spix, 1827)
- Anodontites trapesialis Lamarck, 1819
- Anodontites trigona (Spix, 1827)
- Mycetopoda pittieri Marshall, 1919
- Mycetopoda soleniformes D’Orbigny, 1835
- Tamsiella tamsiana Dunker, 1895

Family Pisidiidae

- Eupera bahiensis (Spix, 1827)
- Eupera modioliforme Anton, 1837
- Eupera simoni Jousseaume, 1889

== See also ==
- List of echinoderms of Venezuela
- List of Poriferans of Venezuela
- List of introduced molluscs of Venezuela
- List of marine molluscs of Venezuela
- List of molluscs of Falcón state, Venezuela
- List of non-marine molluscs of El Hatillo Municipality, Miranda, Venezuela
- List of birds of Venezuela
- List of mammals of Venezuela

Lists of molluscs of surrounding countries:

- List of non-marine molluscs of Colombia
- List of non-marine molluscs of Guyana
- List of non-marine molluscs of Brazil

Overseas:

- List of non-marine molluscs of Trinidad and Tobago
- List of non-marine molluscs of Grenada
- List of non-marine molluscs of Curaçao
- List of non-marine molluscs of Aruba
