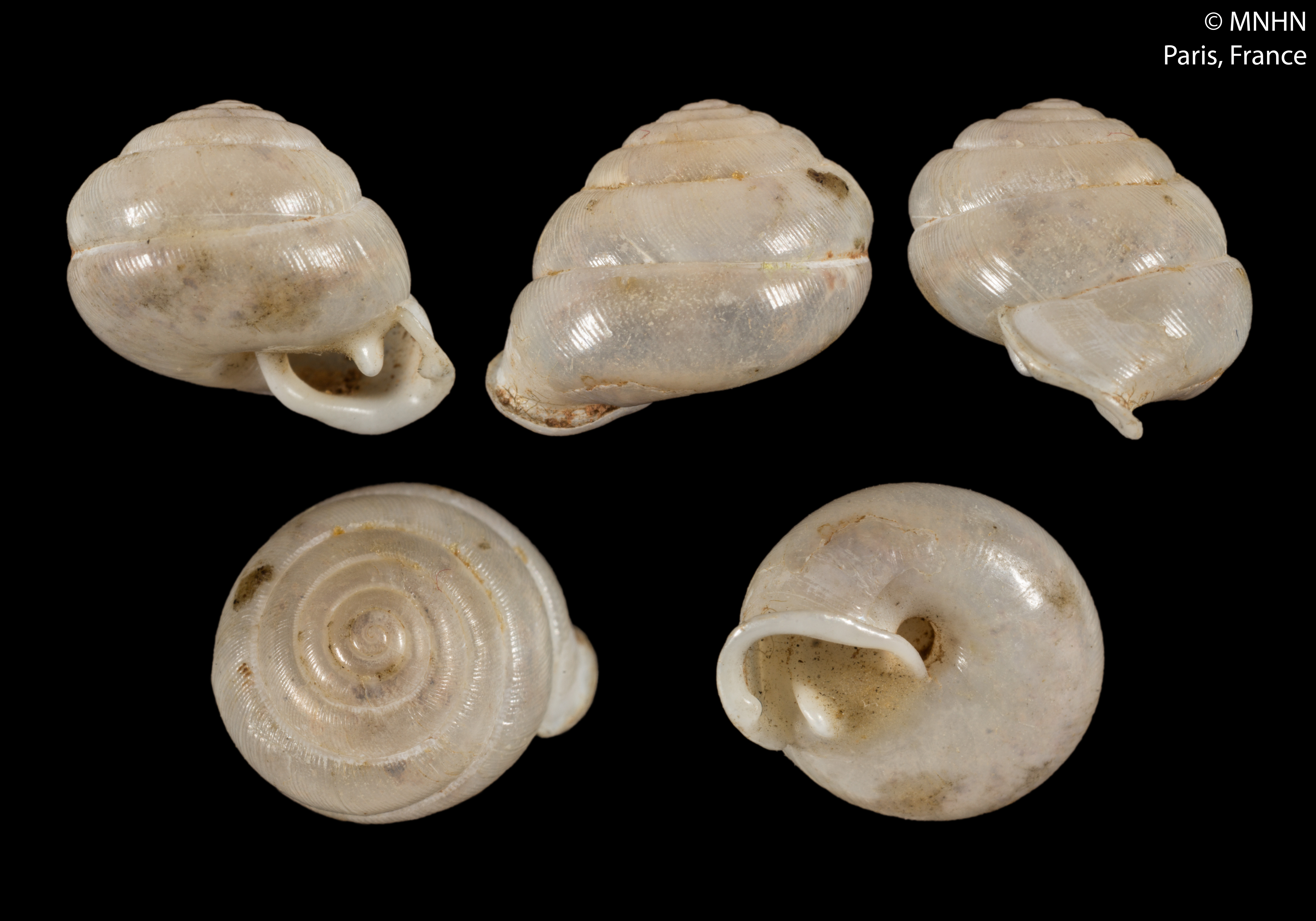
- Shell of Streptartemon comboides (syntype at MNHN, Paris)

Scientific classification
- Kingdom: Animalia
- Phylum: Mollusca
- Class: Gastropoda
- Order: Stylommatophora
- Suborder: Achatinina
- Superfamily: Streptaxoidea
- Family: Streptaxidae
- Genus: Streptartemon; Kobelt, 1905

Type species
- Helix (Streptaxis) streptodon S. Moricand, 1851

Synonyms
- Streptaxis (Streptartemon) Kobelt, 1905 (original rank)

= Streptartemon =

Genus of gastropods

Streptartemon is a genus of air-breathing land snails, terrestrial pulmonate gastropod mollusks in the subfamily Streptaxinae of the family Streptaxidae.

== Distribution ==
The distribution of the genus Streptartemon includes South America:

- Brazil
- Bolivia
- Colombia
- Venezuela
- Guyana

== Species ==
Species within the genus Streptartemon include:

- Streptartemon abunaensis (Baker, 1914)
- Streptartemon comboides (d’Orbigny, 1835)
- Streptartemon cookeanus (Baker, 1914)
- Streptartemon crossei (Pfeiffer, 1867)
- Streptartemon cryptodon (Moricand, 1851)
- Streptartemon cumingianus (Pfeiffer, 1849)
- Streptartemon decipiens (Crosse, 1865)
- Streptartemon deformis (Férussac, 1821)
- Streptartemon deplanchei (Drouet, 1859)
- Streptartemon elatus (Moricand, 1846)
- Streptartemon extraneus Haas, 1955
- Streptartemon glaber (Pfeiffer, 1849)
- Streptartemon laevigatus (d'Orbigny, 1835)
- Streptartemon quixadensis (Baker, 1914)
- Streptartemon streptodon (Moricand, 1851)
- Streptartemon waukeen Salvador & C.M. Cunha, 2020
- Streptartemon zischkai (Haas, 1952)

Species brought into synonymy

- Streptartemon candeanus (Petit, 1842): synonym of Streptaxis candei Petit de la Saussaye, 1842
- Streptartemon dejectus (Petit, 1842): synonym of Odontartemon dejectus (Moricand, 1836) (junior homonym of Helix dejecta Moricand, 1836)
- Streptartemon huberi Thach, 2016: synonym of Indoartemon huberi (Thach, 2016) (original combination)
- Streptartemon quixadensis [sic] accepted as Streptartemon quixadaensis (F. Baker, 1914) (misspelling)
