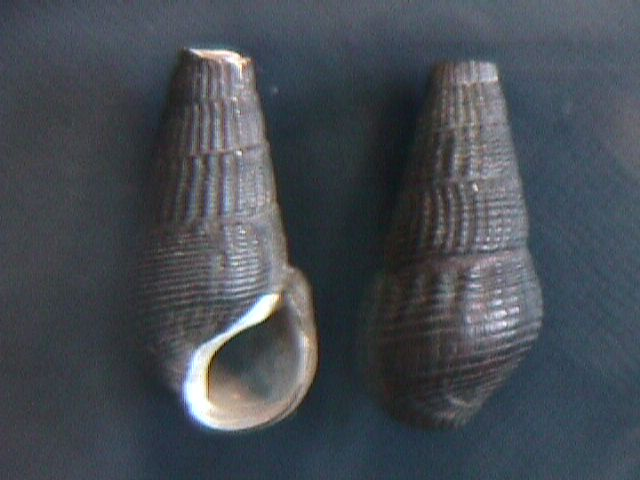
- Two shells of Doryssa consolidata

Scientific classification
- Kingdom: Animalia
- Phylum: Mollusca
- Class: Gastropoda
- Subclass: Caenogastropoda
- Order: incertae sedis
- Family: Pachychilidae
- Genus: Doryssa; H. Adams & A. Adams, 1854

= Doryssa =

Genus of gastropods

Doryssa is a genus of freshwater snails which have an operculum, aquatic gastropod mollusks in the family Pachychilidae.

== Distribution ==
These freshwater snails are endemic to South America.

== Species ==
Species within the genus Doryssa include:

- Doryssa atra (Bruguière, 1792)
- Doryssa brevior (Troschel, 1848) - type species of the genus Doryssa
- Doryssa consolidata (Bruguière, 1790)
- Doryssa derivans Brot, 1874
- Doryssa geijskesi (Pain, 1956)
- Doryssa gruneri (Jonas, 1844)
- Doryssa hohenackeri (Philippi, 1851)
- Doryssa kappleri (Vernhout, 1914)
- Doryssa lamarckiana (Brot, 1870)
- Doryssa petechialis (Brot, 1860)
- Doryssa schuppi (Ihering, 1902)
- Doryssa transversa (Lea, 1850)
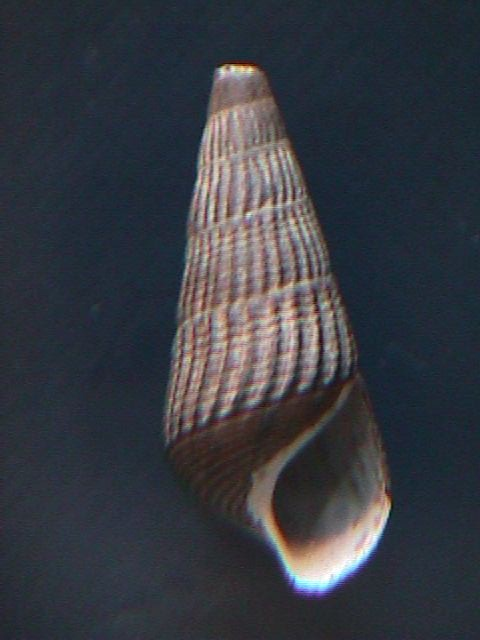
Doryssa atra

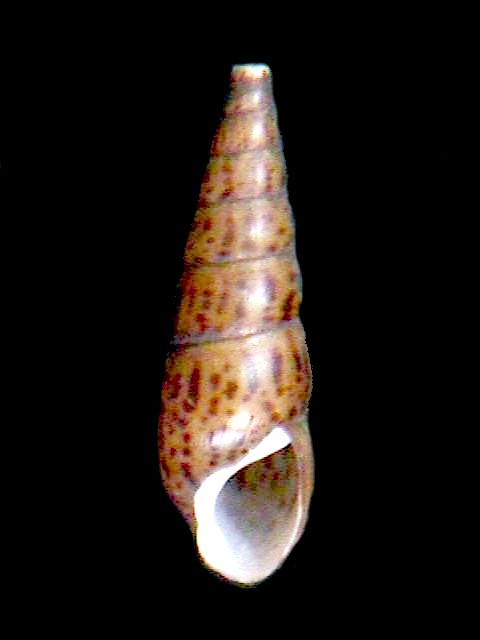
Doryssa hohenackeri

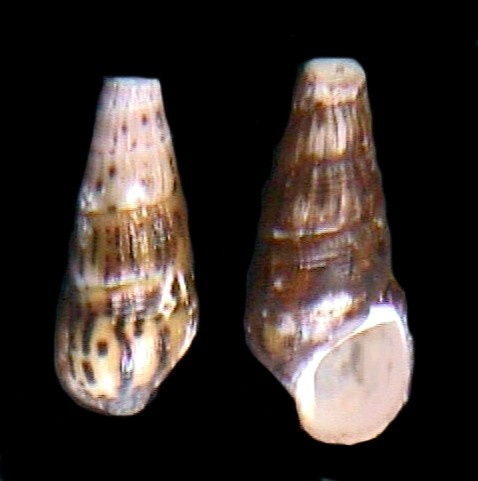
Doryssa kappleri
