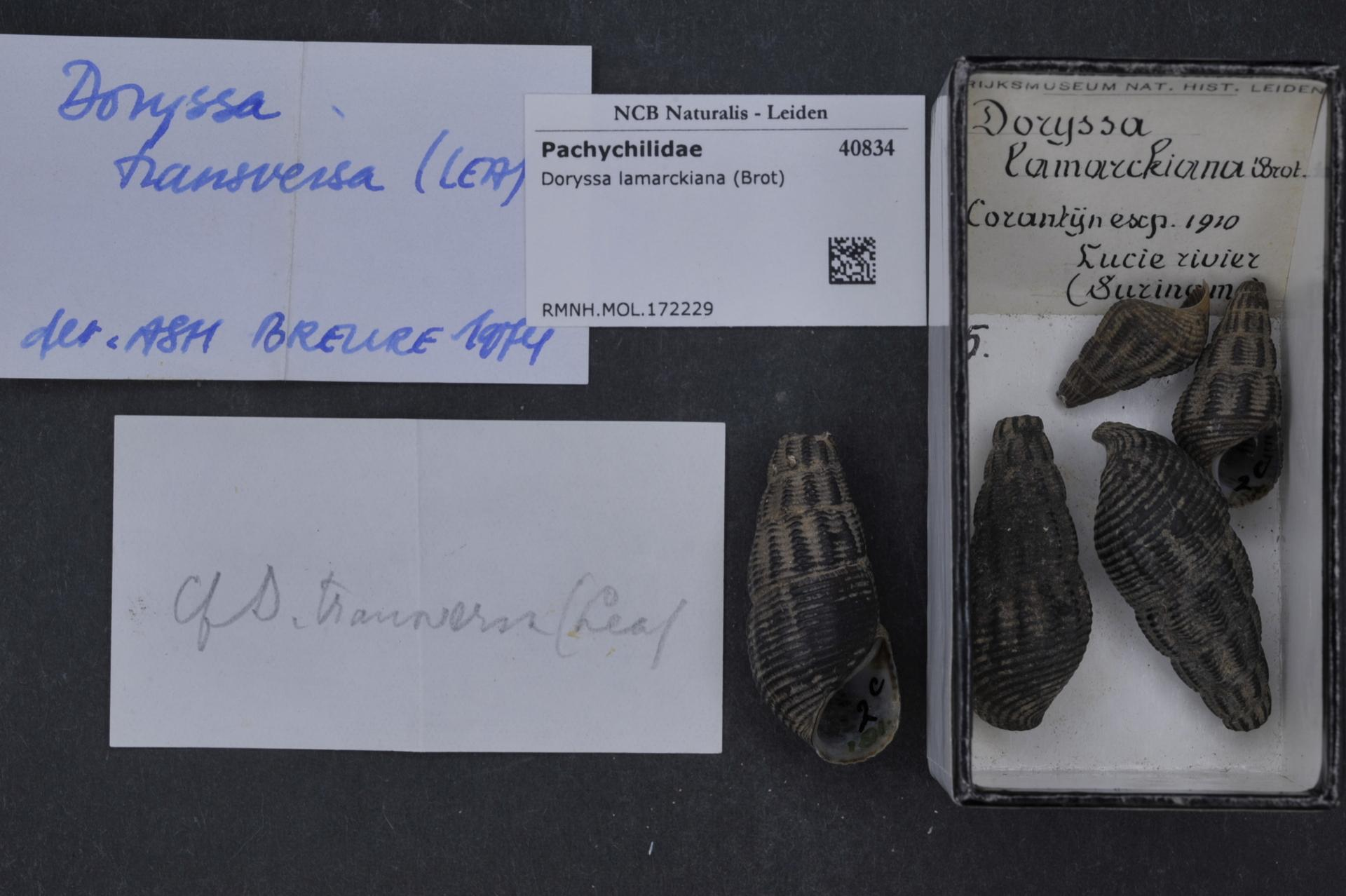
- Shells of Doryssa lamarckiana

Scientific classification
- Domain: Eukaryota
- Kingdom: Animalia
- Phylum: Mollusca
- Class: Gastropoda
- Subclass: Caenogastropoda
- Family: Pachychilidae
- Genus: Doryssa
- Species: D. lamarckiana

Binomial name
- Doryssa lamarckiana (Brot, 1870)

= Doryssa lamarckiana =

Species of gastropod

Doryssa lamarckiana is a species of freshwater snail with an operculum, an aquatic gastropod mollusc in the family Pachychilidae.

== Distribution ==
Distribution of Doryssa lamarckiana include Venezuela.
