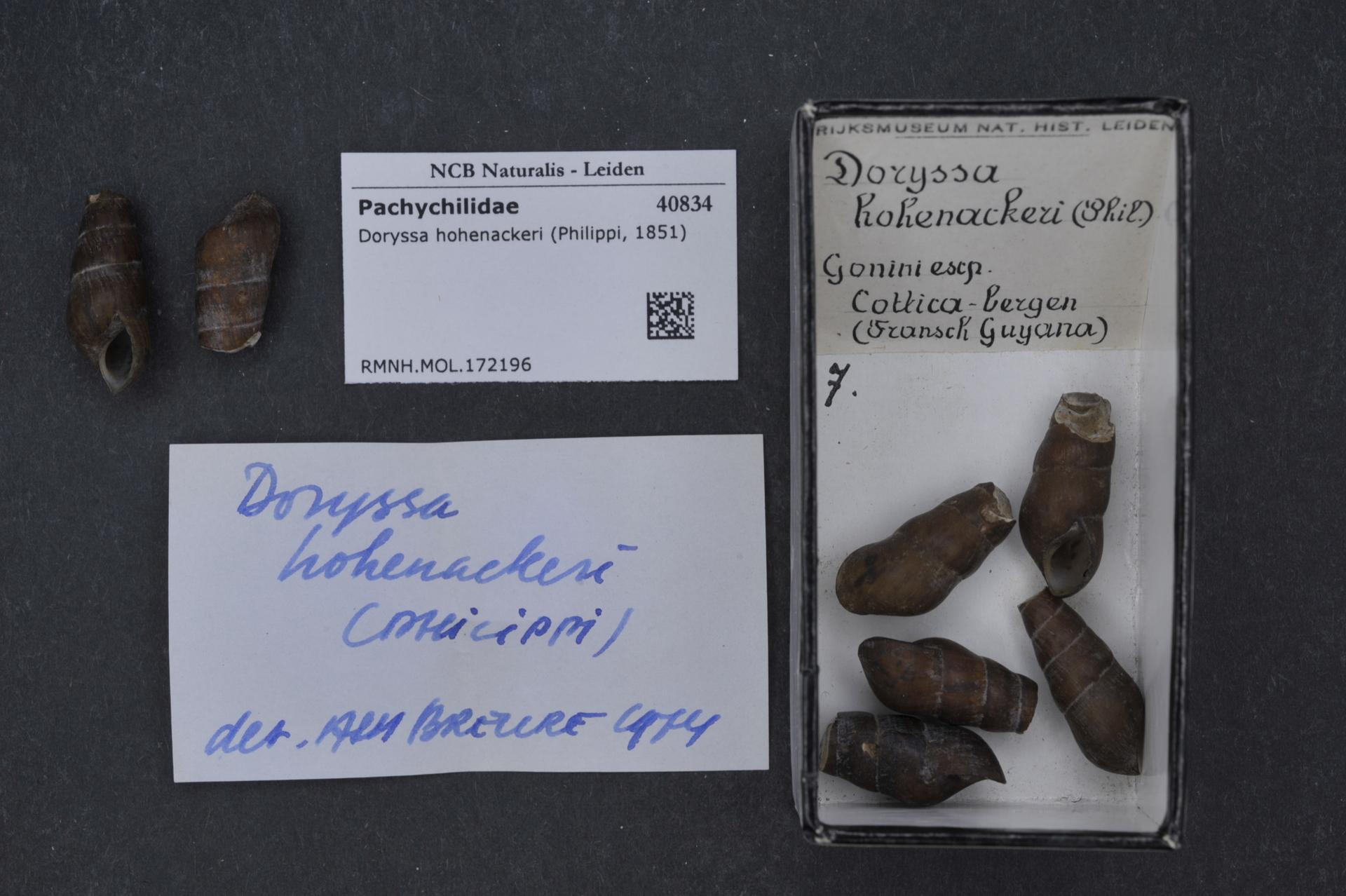
- Shells of Doryssa hohenackeri.

Conservation status
- Least Concern (IUCN 3.1)

Scientific classification
- Kingdom: Animalia
- Phylum: Mollusca
- Class: Gastropoda
- Subclass: Caenogastropoda
- Order: incertae sedis
- Family: Pachychilidae
- Genus: Doryssa
- Species: D. hohenackeri

Binomial name
- Doryssa hohenackeri (Philippi, 1851)

Synonyms
- Melania hohenackeri Philippi, 1851

= Doryssa hohenackeri =

Species of gastropod

Doryssa hohenackeri is a species of freshwater snail with an operculum, an aquatic gastropod mollusc in the family Pachychilidae.

== Distribution ==
This species occurs in the South America:

- Venezuela
- Guyana
- Puerto Rico
- Suriname
