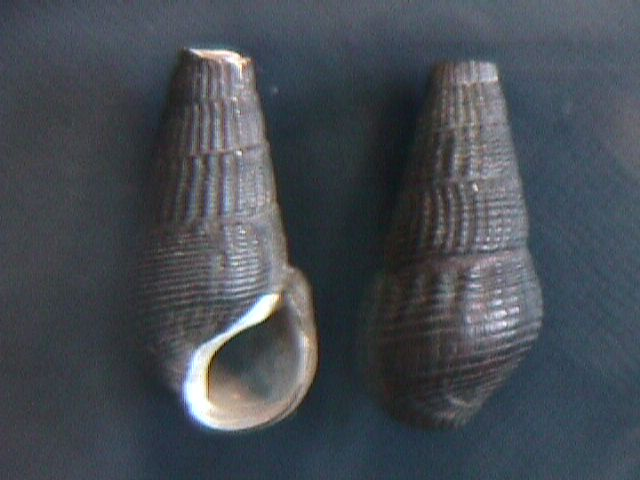
- Two shells of Doryssa consolidata

Scientific classification
- Domain: Eukaryota
- Kingdom: Animalia
- Phylum: Mollusca
- Class: Gastropoda
- Subclass: Caenogastropoda
- Family: Pachychilidae
- Genus: Doryssa
- Species: D. consolidata

Binomial name
- Doryssa consolidata (Bruguière, 1790)

Synonyms
- Bulimus consolidatus Bruguière, 1790

= Doryssa consolidata =

Species of gastropod

Doryssa consolidata is a species of freshwater snail with an operculum, an aquatic gastropod mollusk in the family Pachychilidae.

== Distribution ==
This species occurs in the South America:

- Venezuela
- Guyana
