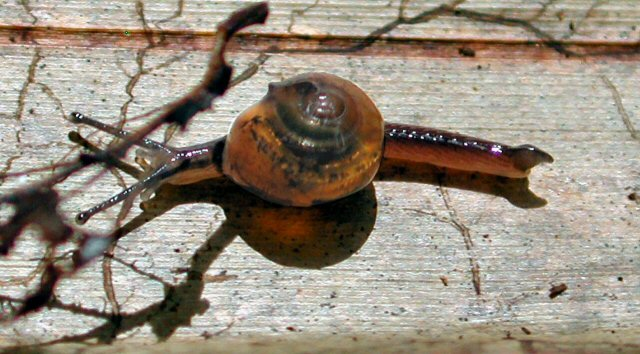
- A live individual of Ovachlamys fulgens, notice the caudal horn on the tail end of the foot

Conservation status
- Secure (NatureServe)

Scientific classification
- Kingdom: Animalia
- Phylum: Mollusca
- Class: Gastropoda
- Order: Stylommatophora
- Family: Helicarionidae
- Genus: Ovachlamys
- Species: O. fulgens

Binomial name
- Ovachlamys fulgens (Gude, 1900)

Synonyms
- Macrochlamys fulgens Gude, 1900

= Ovachlamys fulgens =

Species of gastropod

Ovachlamys fulgens is a species of air-breathing land snail, a terrestrial pulmonate gastropod mollusk in the family Helicarionidae.

Ovachlamys fulgens was originally discovered and described as Macrochlamys fulgens by the British malacologist Gerard Pierre Laurent Kalshoven Gude in 1900.

== Distribution ==
The type locality for this species is Ryukyu Islands (Loo-Choo Islands). The type specimens are stored in the Florida Museum of Natural History.

The snail is thought to be originally from the Ryukyu Islands.

Ovachlamys fulgens has spread to various countries, most probably accidentally introduced with the orchid trade. Non-indigenous distribution of Ovachlamys fulgens include:

Americas:

- Costa Rica The most frequent non-indigenous distribution has this species in Costa Rica.
- USA:
  - Miami-Dade County, Florida - it has been reported since 2003, but its wide distribution in the areas sampled strongly indicates that it has been established in southern Florida for some time.
  - Broward County, Florida - it has been reported since 2003.
- Trinidad and Tobago
- Colombia
- Brazil - since 2015

Pacific:

- Hawaii

Several Southeast Asian countries:

- Thailand
- Singapore

This species is already established in the US, and is considered to represent a potentially serious threat as a pest, an invasive species which could negatively affect agriculture, natural ecosystems, human health or commerce. Therefore, it has been suggested that this species be given top national quarantine significance in the USA.

== Description ==
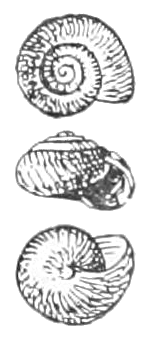
The drawings in the type description were created by the illustrator John Nugent Fitch and show apical, apertural and umbilical views of the shell of Ovachlamys fulgens.

The shell of this species is perforate, trochoid, thin, shining, pellucid and dark corneous,with a depressed spire. The apex is obtuse. Sutures are linear and margined. The shell has four whorls, that are increasing rather suddenly. The last whorl is convex and a little inflated and it is twice as wide as the penultimate whorl. Whorls are finely striated, decussated by microscopic spiral lines. The last whorl is not descending and it is slightly excavated in the umbilical region.

The aperture is slightly oblique and lunate. The peristome is thin, straight, and acute. The margins of the aperture are distant and sub-parallel, and the columellar margin is a little reflected and nearly covering the very narrow umbilical perforation.

The width of the shell is 6–7 mm and the height of the shell is 4,5 mm.

These snails are sometimes called "jumping snails" because the tail is modified with a caudal horn and the posterior part of the foot acts as a catapult to push off from contiguous substrates, allowing the snail to suddenly move several inches.

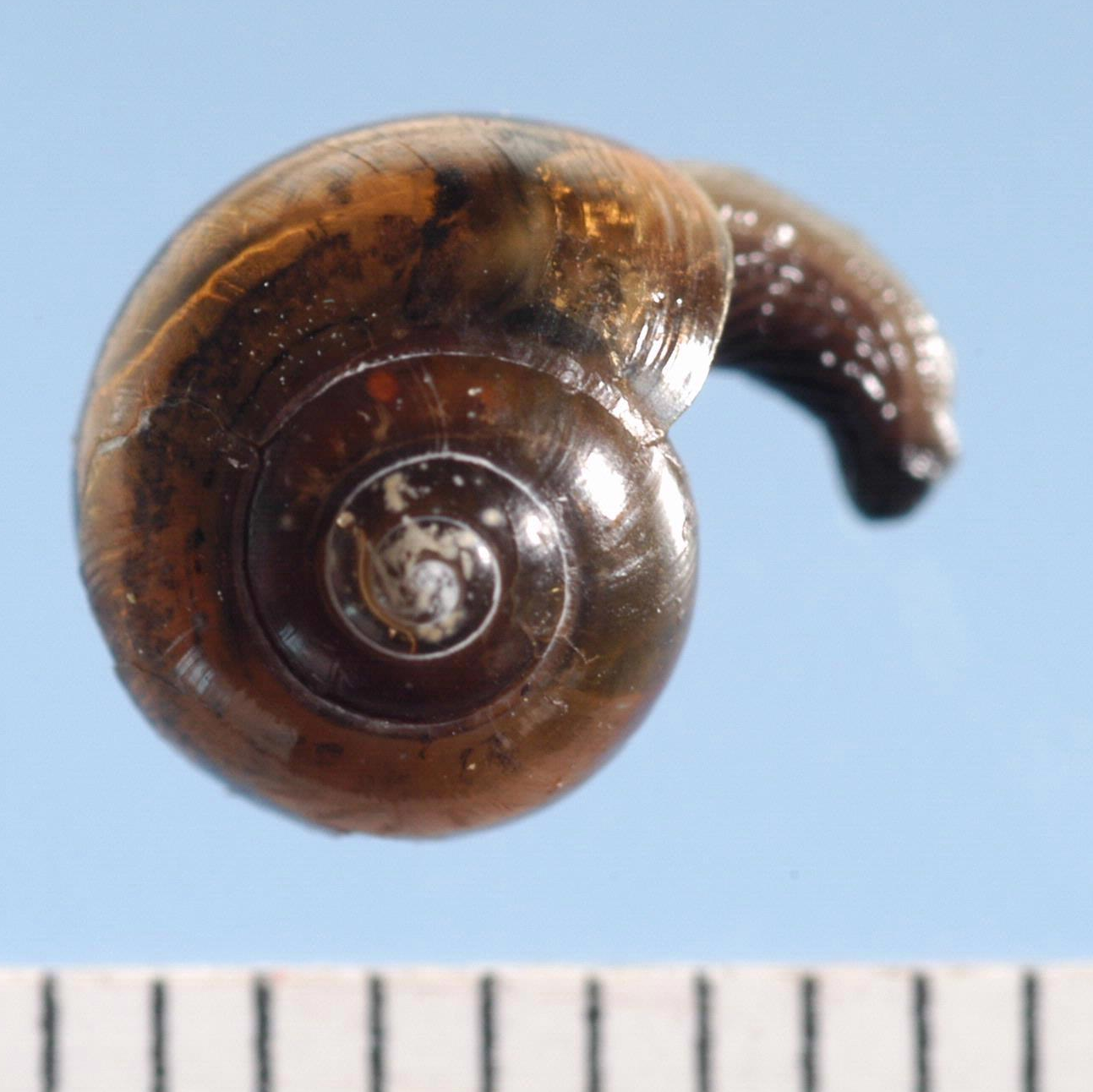
Apical view of a preserved specimen of Ovachlamys fulgens. The scale bar is in mm

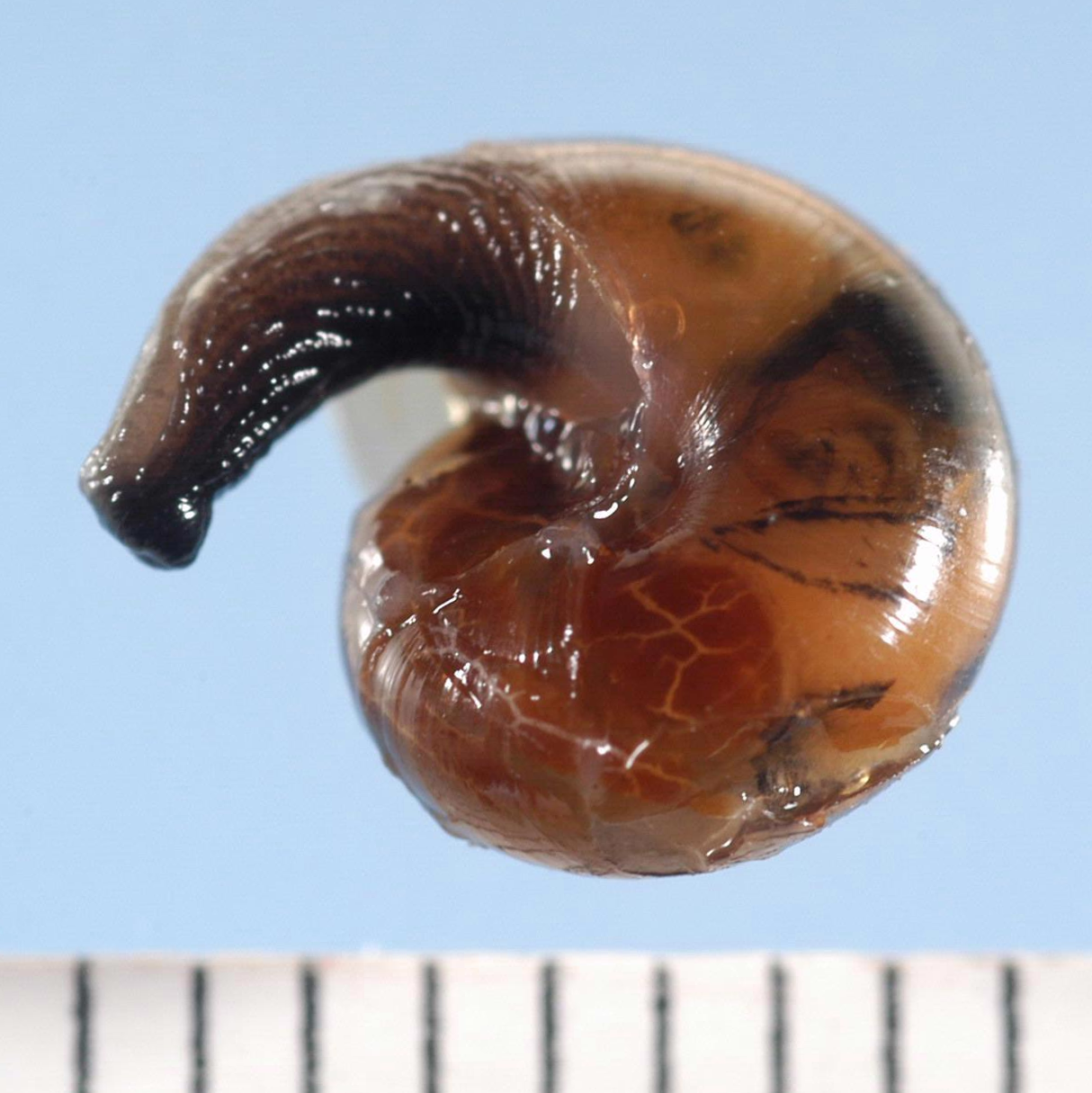
Umbilical view of a preserved specimen of Ovachlamys fulgens. The scale bar is in mm.

== Ecology ==
The habitats of Ovachlamys fulgens include pastures and crop fields with moisture and with deep leaf litter cover. For example, habitats with Yucca guatemalensis provide good conditions for this species. The snails are mostly found in soil litter and on plants up to 8 feet in height in areas of secondary growth and tree plantations. The ideal collection time is after rainfall.

This species is considered an important orchid pest. It is phytophagous and is reported to attack a wide variety of horticultural plants, but the snails are mostly found among soil litter and become dormant during dry periods. It has been found on avocado, mango, Heliconia and Dracaena. Leaves of the avocado can be also used to raise juveniles in lab settings.

Little scientific data has been gathered on the biology of this species.

Individuals of Ovachlamys fulgens can lay eggs at the age of 42 days and are considered mature when their shell width reaches 5.12 mm. There is no need for the snails to mate in order to lay eggs and for successful reproduction. Eggs are laid in clutches of three in soil or leaf litter where they absorb more water from the environment.

The lifespan of Ovachlamys fulgens is 9 months in lab settings.

=== Parasites ===
Parasites of Ovachlamys fulgens include Angiostrongylus cantonensis.
