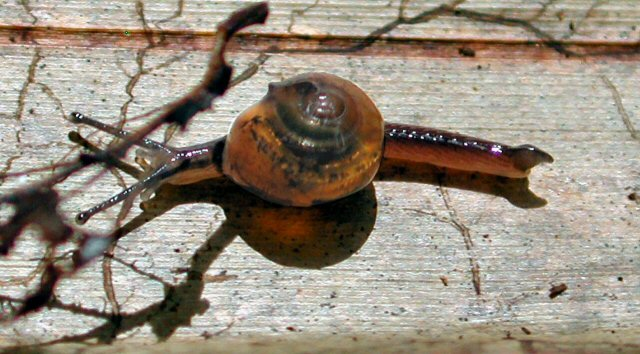
- Ovachlamys fulgens

Scientific classification
- Kingdom: Animalia
- Phylum: Mollusca
- Class: Gastropoda
- Order: Stylommatophora
- Family: Helicarionidae
- Genus: Ovachlamys; Habe, 1946

= Ovachlamys =

Genus of gastropods

Ovachlamys is a genus of land snails in the family Helicarionidae.

== Species ==
Species include:

- Ovachlamys fulgens – jumping snail
- Ovachlamys fulgida
- Ovachlamys kandai
- Ovachlamys kotosyonis
