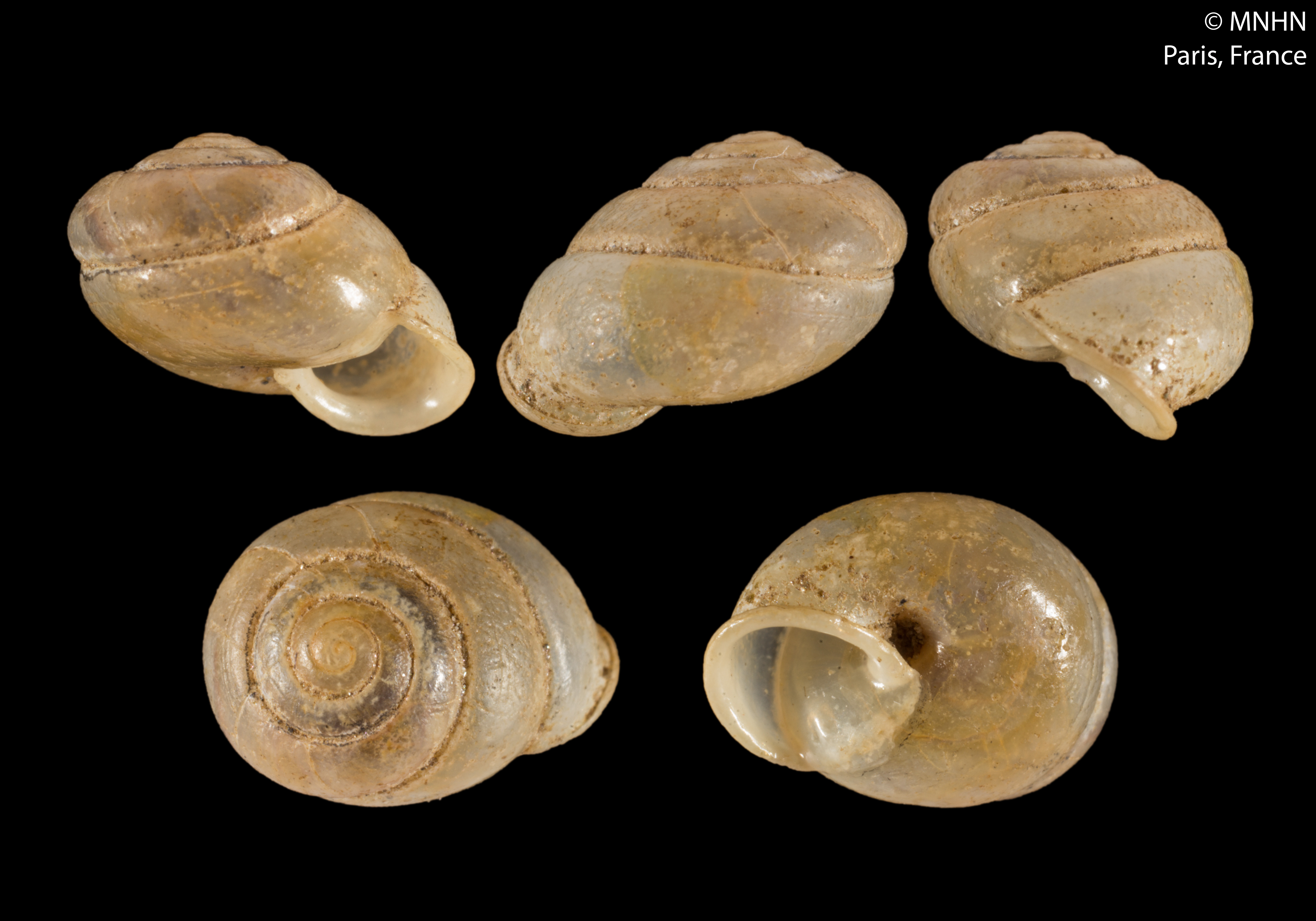
- Shell of Streptartemon glaber normalis (syntype at MNHN, Paris)

Scientific classification
- Kingdom: Animalia
- Phylum: Mollusca
- Class: Gastropoda
- Order: Stylommatophora
- Family: Streptaxidae
- Genus: Streptartemon
- Species: S. glaber

Binomial name
- Streptartemon glaber (L. Pfeiffer, 1849)

Synonyms
- Streptaxis (Odontartemon) glaber L. Pfeiffer, 1850 ·; Streptaxis (Streptartemon) glaber L. Pfeiffer, 1850; Streptaxis glaber L. Pfeiffer, 1850 (unaccepted combination); Streptaxis glabra L. Pfeiffer, 1850

= Streptartemon glaber =

Species of gastropod

Streptartemon glaber is a species of air-breathing land snail, terrestrial pulmonate gastropod mollusk in the family Streptaxidae.

Subspecies

- Streptartemon glaber aroae (H. B. Baker, 1925)
- Streptartemon glaber glaber (L. Pfeiffer, 1850)
- Streptartemon glaber normalis (Jousseaume, 1889)

== Distribution ==
The distribution of Streptartemon glaber includes:

- Puerto Rico
- U.S. Virgin Islands
- Saint Thomas
- Saint Croix
- Dominica - The effect of this introduced, carnivorous species on the native Dominican malacofauna is undocumented as yet.
- Barbados
- Trinidad
- Tobago
- Venezuela
- Guyana
- Suriname
- Brazil
