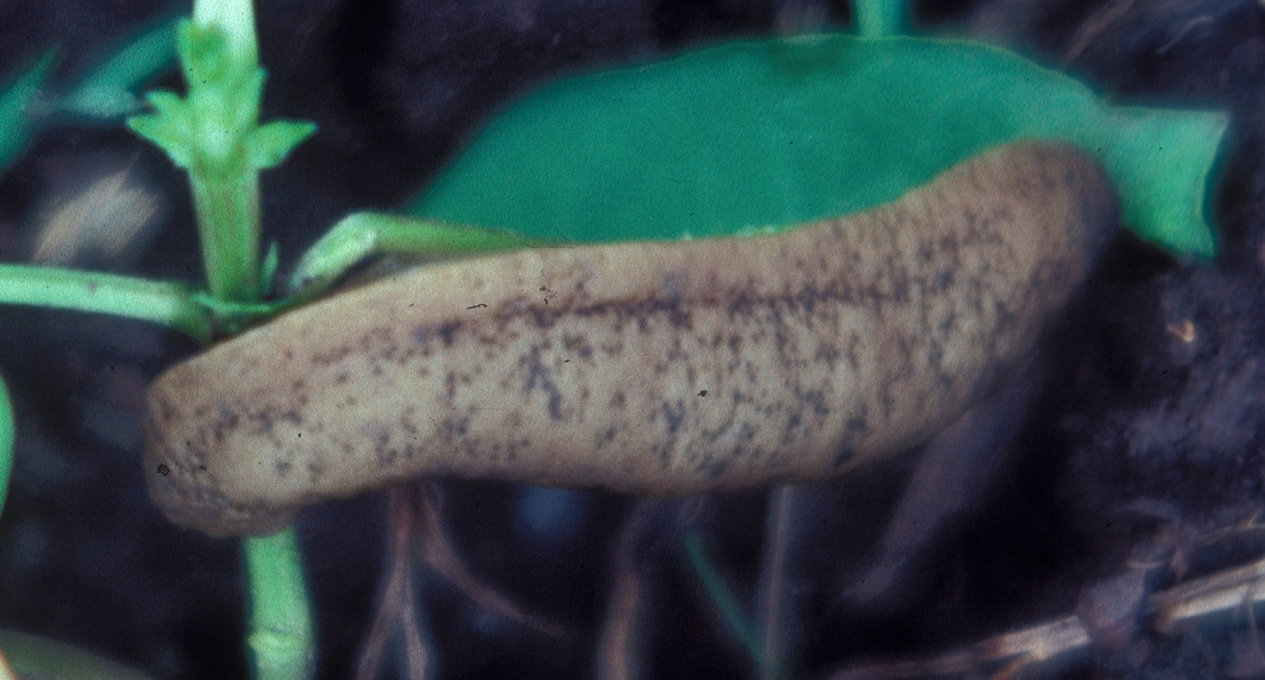
- A live individual of Sarasinula plebeia

Conservation status
- Secure (NatureServe)

Scientific classification
- Kingdom: Animalia
- Phylum: Mollusca
- Class: Gastropoda
- Order: Systellommatophora
- Family: Veronicellidae
- Genus: Sarasinula
- Species: S. plebeia

Binomial name
- Sarasinula plebeia (P. Fischer, 1868)

Synonyms
- List: Angustipes dubia; Angustipes dubius; Angustipes plebeius; Imerimia plebeja; Sarasinula dubia (Semper); Sarasinula lemei (Thomé, 1967); Sarasinula plebeja (Grimpe & Hoffman, 1925); Vaginula behni (Semper, 1885); Vaginula dubia; Vaginula moerchi; Vaginula plebeja (Fischer, 1868); Vaginula plebeius; Vaginulus dubius; Vaginulus plebeius (Fischer, 1868); Vernicella plebeius; Viginula dubia; Viginula moerchi

= Sarasinula plebeia =

Species of slug

Sarasinula plebeia, commonly called the bean slug or the Caribbean leatherleaf slug, is a species of air-breathing land slug, terrestrial pulmonate gastropod mollusks in the family Veronicellidae.

== Distribution ==
Sarasinula plebeia was originally discovered by French zoologist Paul Henri Fischer from New Caledonia and described under the name Vaginulus plebeius in 1868. The type locality of the species is New Caledonia.

The distribution of Sarasinula plebeia includes:

- Cuba
- Jamaica
- Saint Martin, Leeward Islands
- Dominica
- Canouan
- Saba Island
- Southern USA
- from Mexico to Panama:
  - Mexico
  - Costa Rica
- Rio Grande do Sul, Brazil
- Venezuela
- China (introduced)
- Saipan, Mariana Islands (introduced)
- Ritidian Point, Guam (introduced)
- San José, Leyte, Philippines (introduced)
- Wasi, Ambon Island, Moluccas(introduced)
- Vate, Aoba Island, Malakula Island, Espiritu Santo and Malo Island, New Hebrides(introduced)

The species is already established in the USA and is considered to represent a potentially serious threat as an invasive species, particularly to agriculture. It has therefore been suggested that this species be given top national quarantine significance in the USA.

== Ecology ==
Parasites of Sarasinula plebeia include:

- Angiostrongylus cantonensis

== As a pest ==
In Central America, Sarasinula plebeia is considered a major pest to agriculture.

== Genetics ==
The species is economically important, but as of 2001, only partial sequences of the 28S ribosomal RNA gene of the species had been published, by Dayrat et al. No further genetic data was made available until April 2010.
