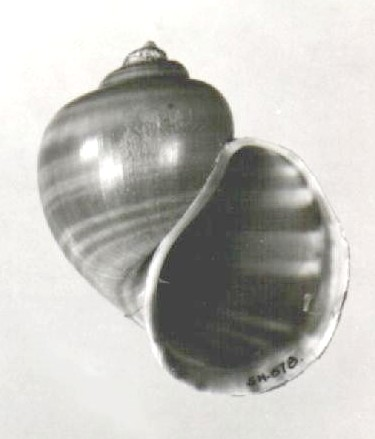
- Apertural view of a shell of Pomacea dolioides

Scientific classification
- Kingdom: Animalia
- Phylum: Mollusca
- Class: Gastropoda
- Subclass: Caenogastropoda
- Order: Architaenioglossa
- Family: Ampullariidae
- Genus: Pomacea
- Species: P. dolioides

Binomial name
- Pomacea dolioides (Reeve, 1856)

= Pomacea dolioides =

Species of gastropod

Pomacea dolioides is a South American species of freshwater snail with gills and an operculum, an aquatic gastropod mollusk in the family Ampullariidae, the apple snails. It was identified by Lovell Augustus Reeve in 1856.

== Distribution ==
The native distribution of this snail is Brazil.
