= Gastrocopta iheringi =

Scientific classification
- Kingdom: Animalia
- Phylum: Mollusca
- Class: Gastropoda
- Order: Stylommatophora
- Family: Gastrocoptidae
- Genus: Gastrocopta
- Species: G. iheringi

Binomial name
- Gastrocopta iheringi (Suter, 1900)

Synonyms
- Pupa iheringi Suter, 1900

Species of gastropod

Gastrocopta iheringi is a species of very small air-breathing land snail, a terrestrial pulmonate gastropod mollusc in the family Gastrocoptidae.

The specific name iheringi is in honor of the zoologist Hermann von Ihering, who collected the type specimen.

Veitenheimer-Mendes & Oliveira redescribed the type material in 2012.

== Distribution ==
This species occurs in Brazil and Venezuela.
