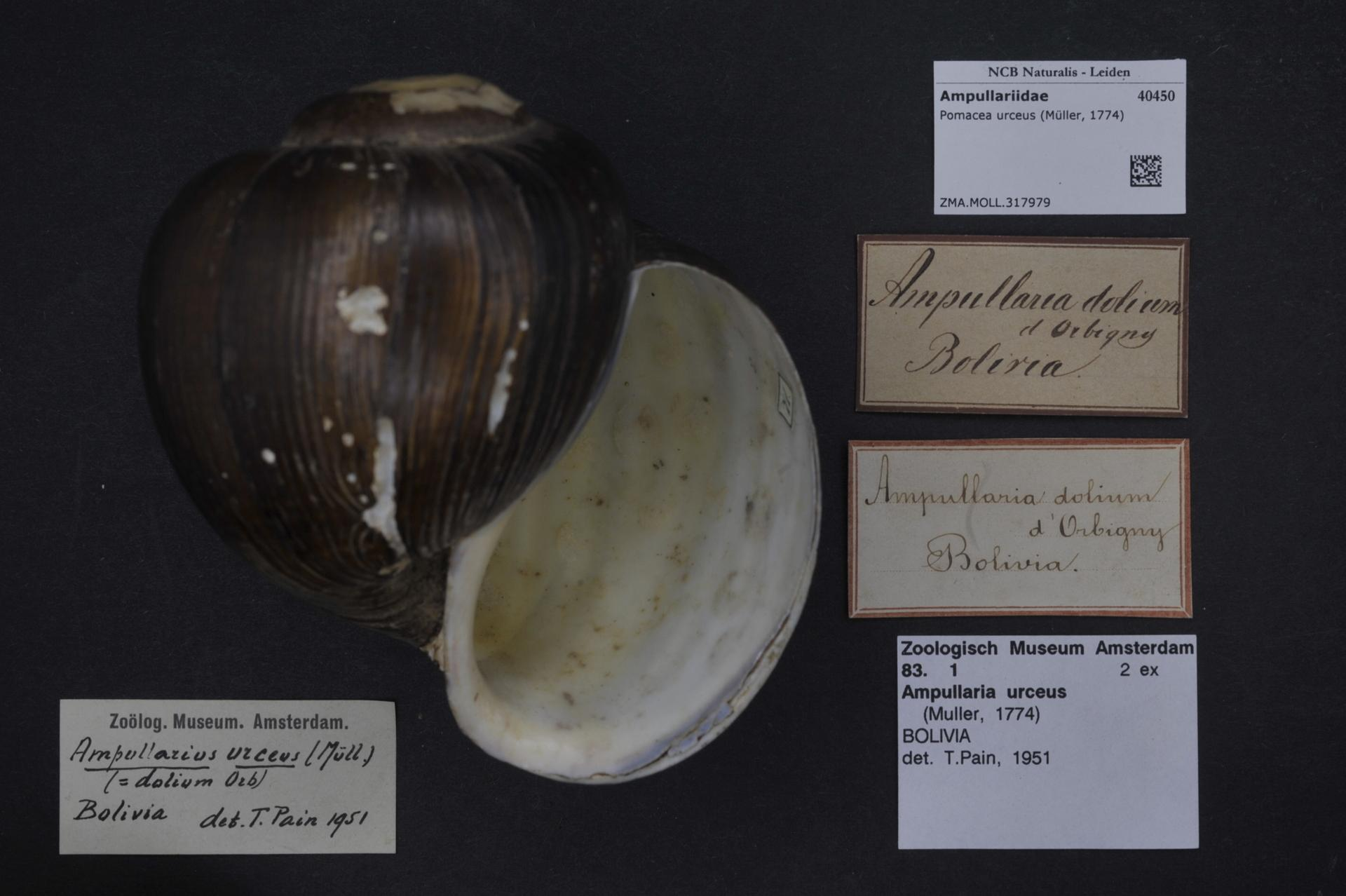
- Pomacea urceus from the Naturalis Biodiversity Center Collection

Scientific classification
- Domain: Eukaryota
- Kingdom: Animalia
- Phylum: Mollusca
- Class: Gastropoda
- Subclass: Caenogastropoda
- Order: Architaenioglossa
- Family: Ampullariidae
- Genus: Pomacea
- Species: P. urceus

Binomial name
- Pomacea urceus (Müller, 1774)

= Pomacea urceus =

Species of gastropod

Pomacea urceus is a species of freshwater gastropod in the family Ampullariidae, native to South America. It is a particularly large species of Pomacea, some specimens of which have been measured 115 mm in height.

The eggs of Pomacea urceus vary in color from pale green to orange. Eggs are placed between the undersurface of the operculum and the aperture of the female when she estivates after the mating season.
