= Pyrgophorus parvulus =

Conservation status
- Least Concern (IUCN 3.1)

Scientific classification
- Kingdom: Animalia
- Phylum: Mollusca
- Class: Gastropoda
- Subclass: Caenogastropoda
- Order: Littorinimorpha
- Family: Cochliopidae
- Genus: Pyrgophorus
- Species: P. parvulus

Binomial name
- Pyrgophorus parvulus (Guilding, 1828)

Species of gastropod

Pyrgophorus parvulus is a species of gastropods belonging to the family Cochliopidae.

The species is found in Central America.
