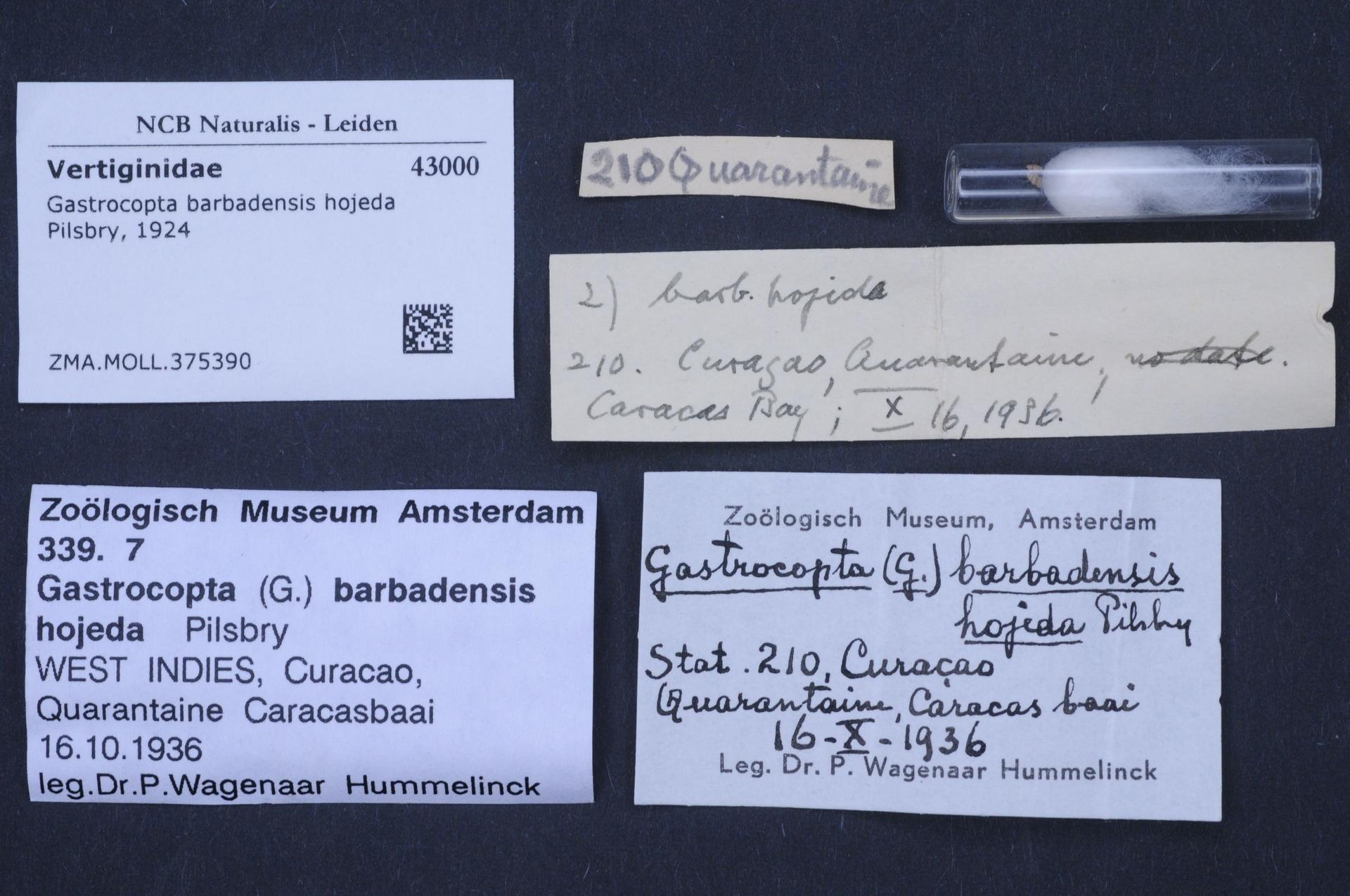

Scientific classification
- Kingdom: Animalia
- Phylum: Mollusca
- Class: Gastropoda
- Order: Stylommatophora
- Family: Gastrocoptidae
- Genus: Gastrocopta
- Species: G. barbadensis

Binomial name
- Gastrocopta barbadensis (Pfeiffer, 1853)

= Gastrocopta barbadensis =

Species of gastropod

Gastrocopta barbadensis is a species of gastropods belonging to the family Gastrocoptidae.

The species is found in Central America.
