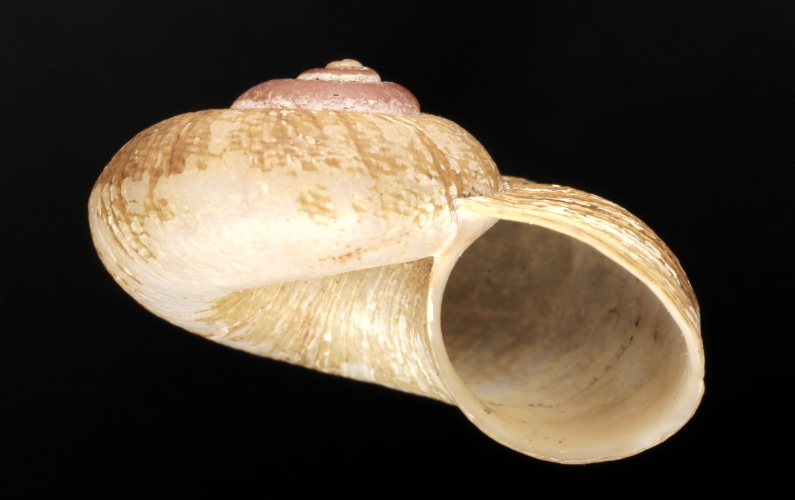
- Shell of Amphicyclotus maleri (syntype at MNHN, Paris)

Scientific classification
- Kingdom: Animalia
- Phylum: Mollusca
- Class: Gastropoda
- Subclass: Caenogastropoda
- Order: Architaenioglossa
- Family: Neocyclotidae
- Subfamily: Amphicyclotinae
- Genus: Amphicyclotus; Crosse & P. Fischer, 1879

Type species
- Cyclostoma (Cyclophorus) boucardi L. Pfeiffer, 1857

Species
- See text

Synonyms
- Aperostoma (Amphicyclotus) Crosse & P. Fischer, 1879 (unaccepted rank); Megacyclotus Bartsch & J. P. E. Morrison, 1942 junior subjective synonym

= Amphicyclotus =

Genus of gastropods

Amphicyclotus is a genus of tropical land snails with gills and an operculum, terrestrial gastropod mollusks in the family Neocyclotidae (according to the taxonomy of the Gastropoda by Bouchet & Rocroi, 2005).

Amphicyclotus is the type genus of the family Neocyclotidae.

== Characteristics ==
(Original description in French) The shell is broadly and deeply umbilicate, globose-turbinate, and subdepressed. The aperture is nearly circular, exhibiting minimal angulation near the insertion point. The peristome is simple and non-reflected, with edges joined by a variable callus deposit. The columellar edge is poorly developed externally, while the basal and outer edges are thin and sharp, slightly thickened internally.

The operculum is orbicular, corneous, and variably thick, thinning towards the edge. It is slightly concave externally, with numerous tightly coiled whorls, particularly concentrated centrally where they constrict. The whorl edges are slightly salient and nearly free. The inner surface is glossy, thickened centrally, resembling an obtuse, flattened nipple.

The radula resembles that of Tomocyclus. The central tooth is subtrapezoidal, slightly arched basally, slightly narrowed medially, and tricuspid with short cusps on its reflected edge. The lateral tooth is elongated, attenuated basally, oblique, and tricuspid, with a dominant median cusp. The inner marginal tooth is arched and tricuspid. The outer marginal tooth is contoured, tricuspid, with a narrow, weaker inner cusp.

== Species ==
Species within the genus Amphicyclotus include:

- Amphicyclotus boucardi (L. Pfeiffer, 1857)
- Amphicyclotus cinereus (Drouët, 1859)
- Amphicyclotus gayi (Hupée, 1854)
- Amphicyclotus maleri Crosse & P. Fischer, 1883
- Amphicyclotus megaplanus J. P. E. Morrison, 1955
- Amphicyclotus palenquensis (Pilsbry, 1935)
- Amphicyclotus parvus F. G. Thompson, 1963
- Amphicyclotus paulsonorum F. G. Thompson, 1969
- Amphicyclotus ponderosus (L. Pfeiffer, 1853)
- Amphicyclotus texturatus (G. B. Sowerby I, 1850)
- Amphicyclotus vesconesi (Jousseaume, 1897)

== Synonyms ==
- Amphicyclotus acutiliratus (Drouët, 1859): synonym of Amphicyclotus rufescens (G. B. Sowerby I, 1843) : synonym of Amphicyclotulus rufescens (G. B. Sowerby I, 1843) (junior subjective synonym)
- Amphicyclotus amethystinus (Guppy, 1868): synonym of Amphicyclotulus amethystinus (Guppy, 1868) (unaccepted combination)
- Amphicyclotus beauianus (Petit de la Saussaye, 1853): synonym of Amphicyclotulus beauianus (Petit de la Saussaye, 1853) (unaccepted combination)
- Amphicyclotus bourcieri (L. Pfeiffer, 1852): synonym of Calaperostoma bourcieri (L. Pfeiffer, 1852) (superseded combination)
- Amphicyclotus cayennensis (Shuttleworth, 1852): synonym of Neocyclotus cayennensis (Shuttleworth, 1852) (unaccepted combination)
- Amphicyclotus chanchapoyasensis S. I. Da Costa, 1906: synonym of Calaperostoma chanchapoyasense (S. I. Da Costa, 1906) (superseded combination)
- Amphicyclotus cousini (Jousseaume, 1884): synonym of Calaperostoma cousini (Jousseaume, 1884) (superseded combination)
- Amphicyclotus crosseanus (Hidalgo, 1866): synonym of Lagocyclus crosseanus (Hidalgo, 1866) (superseded combination)
- Amphicyclotus cumingi (G. B. Sowerby I, 1832): synonym of Calaperostoma cumingii (G. B. Sowerby I, 1832) (unaccepted combination, incorrect subsequent spelling)
- Amphicyclotus cumingii (G. B. Sowerby I, 1832): synonym of Calaperostoma cumingii (G. B. Sowerby I, 1832) (superseded combination)
- Amphicyclotus delphinulus (Mousson, 1869): synonym of Filocyclus delphinulus (Mousson, 1869) (superseded combination)
- Amphicyclotus disjunctus (S. Moricand, 1846): synonym of Cyclopomops moricandi (L. Pfeiffer, 1852)
- Amphicyclotus esmeraldensis (K. Miller, 1879): synonym of Calaperostoma esmeraldense (K. Miller, 1879) (superseded combination)
- Amphicyclotus goldfussi (O. Boettger, 1892): synonym of Amphicyclotus texturatus goldfussi (O. Boettger, 1892) (unaccepted combination)
- Amphicyclotus guayaquilensis (G. B. Sowerby I, 1850): synonym of Calaperostoma guayaquilense (G. B. Sowerby I, 1850) (superseded combination)
- Amphicyclotus haematomma (L. Pfeiffer, 1863): synonym of Lagocyclus haematomma (L. Pfeiffer, 1863) (superseded combination)
- Amphicyclotus hidalgoi (Crosse, 1866): synonym of Calaperostoma hidalgoi (Crosse, 1866) (superseded combination)
- Amphicyclotus liratus (Drouët, 1859): synonym of Amphicyclotulus martinicensis (Shuttleworth, 1857) (junior subjective synonym)
- Amphicyclotus lutescens (L. Pfeiffer, 1853): synonym of Mexcyclotus lutescens (L. Pfeiffer, 1853) (superseded combination)
- Amphicyclotus moricandi (L. Pfeiffer, 1852): synonym of Cyclopomops moricandi (L. Pfeiffer, 1852) (superseded combination)
- Amphicyclotus nigrofasciatus (K. Miller, 1879): synonym of Calaperostoma bourcieri (L. Pfeiffer, 1852) (junior subjective synonym)
- Amphicyclotus olssoni Pilsbry, 1926: synonym of Calacyclotus olssoni (Pilsbry, 1926) (superseded combination)
- Amphicyclotus orbignyi (Ancey, 1892): synonym of Calaperostoma orbignyi (Ancey, 1892) (superseded combination)
- Amphicyclotus psilomitus (L. Pfeiffer, 1853): synonym of Liracyclotus psilomitus (L. Pfeiffer, 1853) (superseded combination)
- Amphicyclotus purus (Forbes, 1850): synonym of Calaperostoma purum (Forbes, 1850) (unaccepted combination)
- Amphicyclotus rosenbergi (S. I. Da Costa, 1898): synonym of Calaperostoma rosenbergi (S. I. Da Costa, 1898) (superseded combination)
- Amphicyclotus rufescens (G. B. Sowerby I, 1843): synonym of Amphicyclotulus rufescens (G. B. Sowerby I, 1843) (unaccepted combination)
- Amphicyclotus schrammi (Shuttleworth, 1857): synonym of Amphicyclotulus schrammi (Shuttleworth, 1857) (superseded combination)
- Amphicyclotus underwoodi (S. I. Da Costa, 1900): synonym of Barbacyclus underwoodi (S. I. Da Costa, 1900) (superseded combination)
- Amphicyclotus vasconesi (Jousseaume, 1897): synonym of Lagocyclus vasconesi (Jousseaume, 1897) (superseded combination)
