= Prócer =

Prócer (Spanish: Hero; plural próceres) may refer to:

- Prócer Que Creó Bandera Patria, a nickname for Antonio Vélez Alvarado
- Panteón de los Próceres, crypt inside the old Church of the Real Colegio de San Carlos
- Gran Centro Los Próceres, shopping complex in Guatemala City, Guatemala
- Parque de los Próceres, park in Mayagüez, Puerto Rico
- Monumento a los Próceres de la Independencia, see Obelisco (Guatemala City)
- Paseo Los Próceres (Walk of the Heroes), in Caracas, Venezuela
- Columna a los próceres del 9 de octubre (Column of the heroes of the October 9) a monument in Guayaquil
- Estamento de próceres, a Senate-like institution outlined in the Spanish Royal Statute of 1834

== See also ==
- Procer (disambiguation)
- Libertadores in Latin American wars of independence
