= Obelisco =

Obelisco may refer to:

- Obelisk of Buenos Aires, in Argentina
- Obelisco (Guatemala City), in Guatemala
