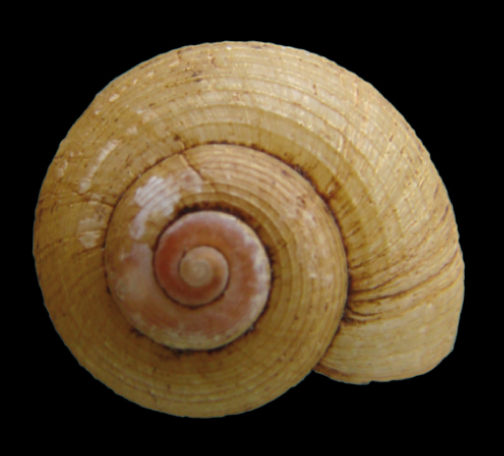
- Apical view of a shell of Amphicyclotulus dominicensis. Width of the shell is 13.2 mm.
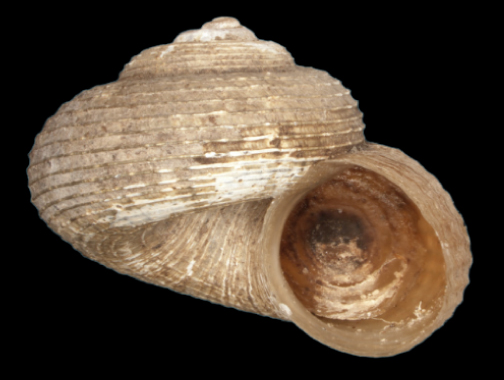
- Apertural view of a shell of Amphicyclotulus dominicensis. Width of the shell is 11.8 mm.

Scientific classification
- Domain: Eukaryota
- Kingdom: Animalia
- Phylum: Mollusca
- Class: Gastropoda
- Subclass: Caenogastropoda
- Order: Architaenioglossa
- Superfamily: Cyclophoroidea
- Family: Neocyclotidae
- Genus: Amphicyclotulus
- Species: A. dominicensis

Binomial name
- Amphicyclotulus dominicensis Bartsch, 1942

Synonyms
- Cyclotus amethystinus var. α Guppy, 1868 (in part)

= Amphicyclotulus dominicensis =

Species of gastropod

Amphicyclotulus dominicensis is a species of tropical land snail with a gill and an operculum, a terrestrial gastropod mollusc in the family Neocyclotidae.

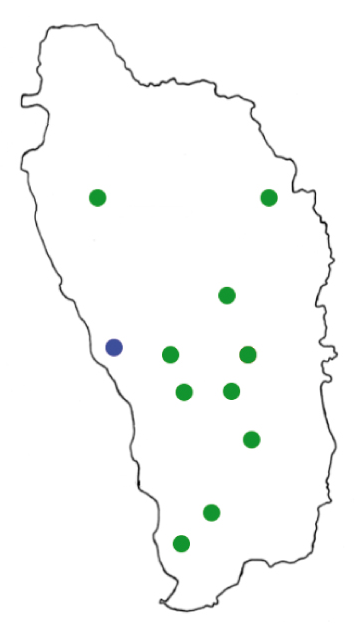
Distribution of Amphicyclotulus dominicensis (one blue dot) and Amphicyclotulus amethystinus (green dots) in Dominica.

== Distribution ==
This species is endemic to the West Indian island of Dominica.

The type locality is Long Dilton, Dominica. The holotype is in National Museum of Natural History under number 535857.

== Shell description ==
Amphicyclotulus dominicensis has spiral cords which are clearly visible and raised.

There are only two species in the genus Amphicyclotulus in Dominica. The other species is Amphicyclotulus amethystinus, which has either no spiral threads or ones that are only weakly present.

Amphicyclotulus dominicensis is smaller than the Amphicyclotulus amethystinus. Amphicyclotulus dominicensis is more coarsely sculptured and has a higher spire. It has been found on the leeward and windward sides of the island of Dominica, at low elevations only.
