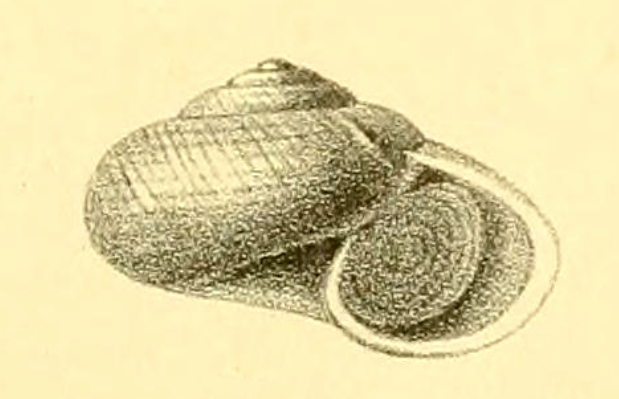
- Shell of Amphicyclotulus portoricensis (holotype)

Scientific classification
- Kingdom: Animalia
- Phylum: Mollusca
- Class: Gastropoda
- Subclass: Caenogastropoda
- Order: Architaenioglossa
- Family: Neocyclotidae
- Genus: Amphicyclotulus
- Species: A. portoricensis

Binomial name
- Amphicyclotulus portoricensis (O. Boettger, 1887)

Synonyms
- Amphicyclotulus (Amphicyclotulus) portoricensis (O. Boettger, 1887) alternative representation; Cyclotus portoricensis O. Boettger, 1887 (original combination); Neocyclotus (Plectocyclotus) portoricensis (O. Boettger, 1887) (unaccepted combination)

= Amphicyclotulus portoricensis =

Species of gastropod

Amphicyclotulus portoricensis is a species of tropical land snail with a gill and an operculum, a terrestrial gastropod mollusc in the family Neocyclotidae.

== Description ==
The height of the shell attains 13.5 mm, its diameter 20.5 mm.

(Original description in Latin) This shell is broadly and perspectively umbilicate, with the umbilicus comprising one-fifth of the base. It is turbinate-depressed, solid, and olive-colored, with a slightly lighter base and a shiny surface. The spire is slightly elevated and convex, featuring a small, somewhat obtuse, usually decorticated red apex. The shell consists of 5 to 5.5 regularly growing, convex whorls, separated by an impressed suture. The whorls are minutely rugose-striated and densely spirally lirate, with 13-15 lirae on the penultimate whorl. The body whorl is rounded, more convex at the base, slightly expanded at the aperture, and either non-descending or minimally descending. The aperture is relatively large, oblique, and triangular-oval, with an orange, shiny interior. The peristome is continuous, straight, sharp, and whitish, with all margins slightly thickened. The columellar margin is slightly retracted and reflexed. The operculum is immersed, horny, 11-spiraled, and has a concave nucleus.

== Distribution ==
This Caribbean species is endemic to the island of Puerto Rico.
