= Ostodes =

Ostodes can be:

- Ostodes (plant), a genus of plants
- Ostodes (gastropod), a genus of land snails
