= Ostodes brazieri =

Conservation status
- Data Deficient (IUCN 2.3)

Scientific classification
- Kingdom: Animalia
- Phylum: Mollusca
- Class: Gastropoda
- Subclass: Caenogastropoda
- Order: Architaenioglossa
- Family: Neocyclotidae
- Genus: Ostodes
- Species: O. brazieri

Binomial name
- Ostodes brazieri (Clench, 1949)

Species of gastropod

Ostodes brazieri is a species of tropical land snail with gills and an operculum, a terrestrial gastropod mollusk in the family Neocyclotidae This species is endemic to Micronesia.
