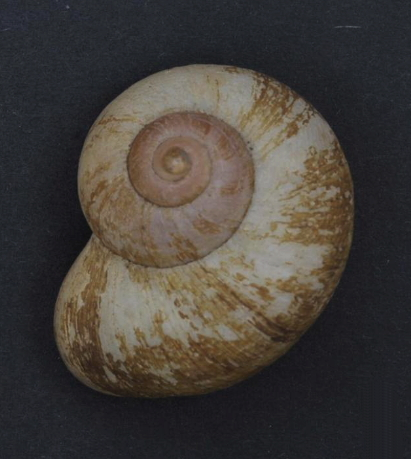
- Shell of Amphicyclotus ponderosus (specimen at Naturalis Biodiversity Center)

Scientific classification
- Kingdom: Animalia
- Phylum: Mollusca
- Class: Gastropoda
- Subclass: Caenogastropoda
- Order: Architaenioglossa
- Family: Neocyclotidae
- Genus: Amphicyclotus
- Species: A. ponderosus

Binomial name
- Amphicyclotus ponderosus (L. Pfeiffer, 1853)

Synonyms
- Cyclophorus ponderosus (L. Pfeiffer, 1853) superseded combination; Cyclostoma ponderosum L. Pfeiffer, 1853 superseded combination; Megacyclotus ponderosus (L. Pfeiffer, 1853) superseded combination

= Amphicyclotus ponderosus =

Species of gastropod

Amphicyclotus ponderosus is a species of tropical land snails with gills and an operculum, terrestrial gastropod mollusks in the family Neocyclotidae.

== Description ==
The height of the shell attains 22 mm, its diameter 46 mm.

(Original description in French) The shell is broadly umbilicate, depressed-conical, thick, and heavy. It is covered with rough malleations, oriented somewhat obliquely. The ground color is a dirty white, beneath a thin, persistent, pellicle-like, light olivaceous-brown periostracum. The spire is briefly conical, terminating in an obtuse apex that transitions from pink to purplish-violet. The suture is well-defined, with a flattened depression in its vicinity. There are five weakly convex, rapidly expanding whorls. The body whorl is wide, subdepressed, and bears an obtuse, funiculariform keel at the periphery. The aperture is oblique, subcircular, becoming angular at its superior margin, and glossy pure white internally. The peristome is straight, thick, subcontinuous, white, and exhibits an angular expansion near its insertion. The margins are joined by a thick, white callus deposit. The columellar margin is strongly arched, the basal margin is rounded, and the outer margin is barely attenuated.

The operculum is subcircular, corneous, and light brown. The outer surface is generally concave, polygyrate with indistinct whorls, and has a somewhat rough texture. It is tightly coiled and more concave centrally. The inner surface is moderately convex, glossy, and slightly darker brown, marked with faint concentric striae around a central, flattened mammilla.

== Distribution ==
This species was found in Guatemala.
