= Attempted assassination of Rómulo Betancourt =

Assassination attempt in Venezuela

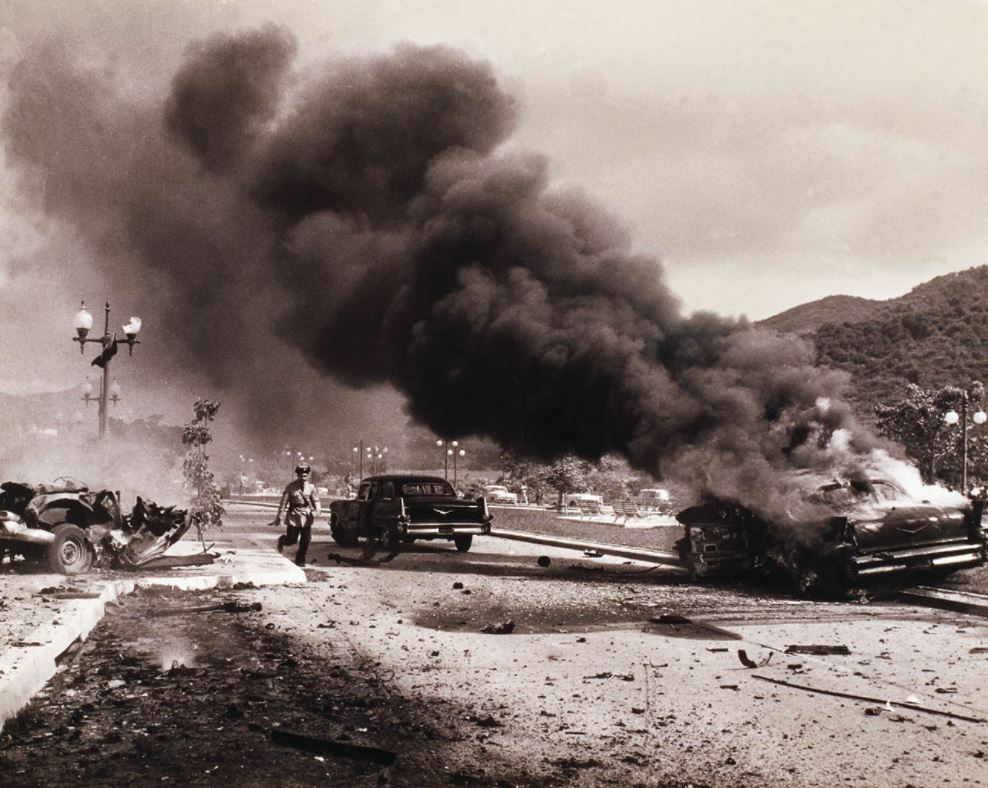
- Explosion in Paseo Los Próceres during Betancourt's assassination attempt, 24 June 1960
- Native name: Intento de asesinato de Rómulo Betancourt
- Date: June 21, 1960
- Time: 09:20 (Frmr. Venezuela legal time)
- Location: Paseo Los Próceres, Caracas, Republic of Venezuela
- Target: Rómulo Betancourt
- Perpetrator: Groups financed by Rafael Trujillo
- Deaths: 2
- Injuries: 4

On 24 June 1960, Venezuelan President Rómulo Betancourt was wounded in an assassination attempt allegedly ordered by the Dominican dictator Rafael Leónidas Trujillo.

The assassination attempt gained worldwide coverage and would boost Betancourt's image in both Venezuela and the greater Latin community in South America. While there was no definitive link to Trujillo, the failed attempt would be a major blow to his reputation and to relations between the Dominican Republic and the USA, with the latter effectively cutting ties with the dictator by the end of the year.

== Background ==
Betancourt had denounced Rafael Trujillo's dictatorship in the Dominican Republic. In turn, Trujillo had developed an obsessive personal hatred of Betancourt and supported many plots by Venezuelan exiles to overthrow him. The Venezuelan government took its case against Trujillo to the Organization of American States, turning to diplomacy first over armed response to resolve the political conflict. This infuriated Trujillo, who ordered his foreign agents to assassinate Betancourt in Caracas.

== Attempt ==
After multiple failed attempts, which were stopped by Trujillo's allies against his wishes, an incendiary car bomb was detonated on 24 June 1960. The bomb was placed in a parked vehicle and detonated as Betancourt's presidential car drove by Paseo Los Próceres, one of the main avenues of Caracas. In the assassination attempt, Betancourt was badly burned, the driver was severely injured, and his head of security was killed.

== Reactions ==
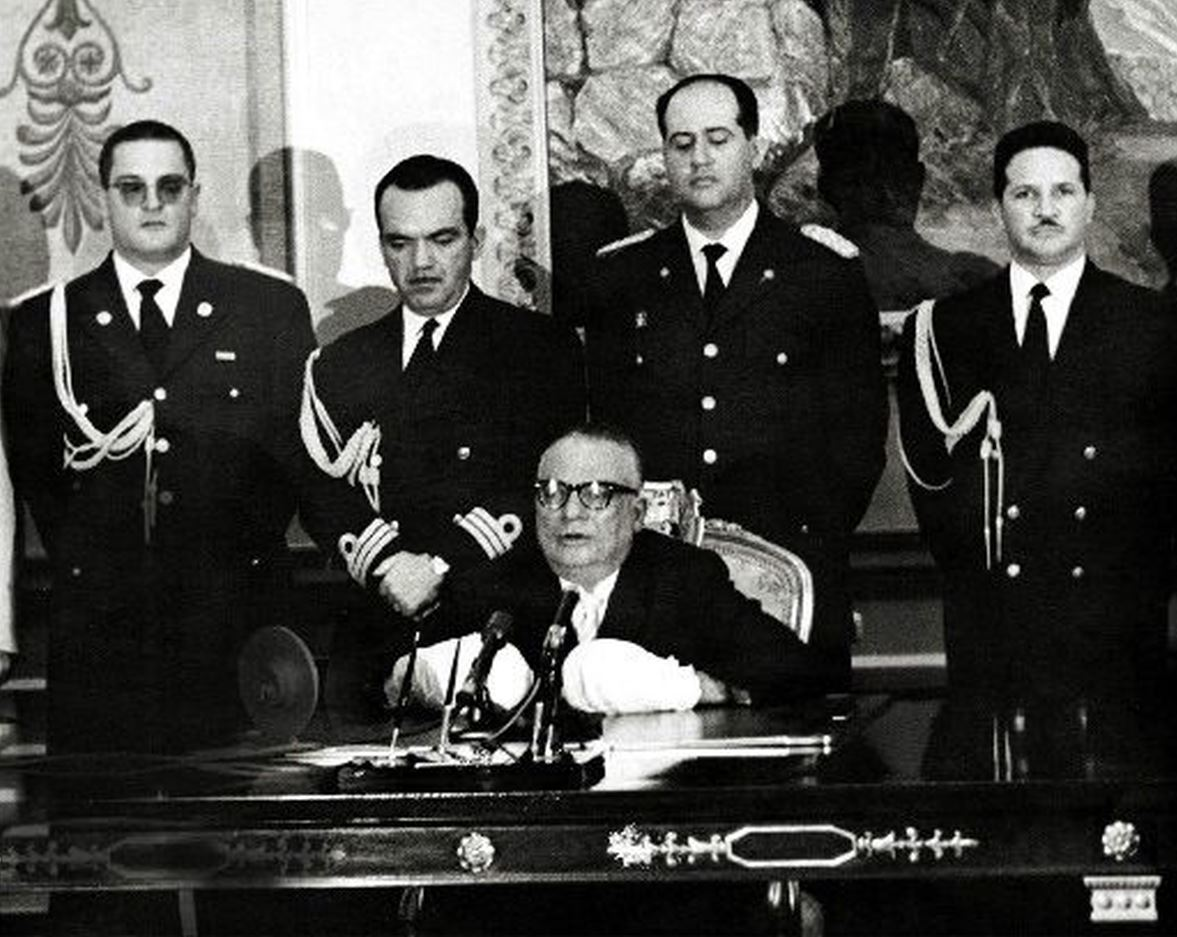
Betancourt delivers a speech with bandaged hands the day after the assassination attempt against him, 25 June 1960

The assassination attempt shocked the country. Betancourt walked out of the hospital in front of photographers, with both burned hands wrapped in bandages. Photos of a wounded but living Betancourt were distributed around the world as proof he survived. The incident elevated him in the eyes of the public opinion and helped to destroy one of his most stern Caribbean enemies at the same time.

== See also ==
- United Nations Security Council Resolution 156
