= Amphicyclotulus mineri =

Scientific classification
- Kingdom: Animalia
- Phylum: Mollusca
- Class: Gastropoda
- Subclass: Caenogastropoda
- Order: Architaenioglossa
- Family: Neocyclotidae
- Genus: Amphicyclotulus
- Species: A. mineri

Binomial name
- Amphicyclotulus mineri Bartsch, 1942

Synonyms
- Amphicyclotulus (Amphicyclotulus) mineri Bartsch, 1942 alternative representation

Species of gastropod

Amphicyclotulus mineri is a species of tropical land snail with a gill and an operculum, a terrestrial gastropod mollusc in the family Neocyclotidae.

== Shell description ==
The length of the shell attains 13.3 mm, its diameter 16.6 mm.

== Distribution ==
This Caribbean species is endemic to Dominica.
