= Amphicyclotus megaplanus =

Scientific classification
- Kingdom: Animalia
- Phylum: Mollusca
- Class: Gastropoda
- Subclass: Caenogastropoda
- Order: Architaenioglossa
- Family: Neocyclotidae
- Genus: Amphicyclotus
- Species: A. megaplanus

Binomial name
- Amphicyclotus megaplanus J. P. E. Morrison, 1955

Species of gastropod

Amphicyclotus megaplanus is a species of tropical land snails with gills and an operculum, terrestrial gastropod mollusks in the family Neocyclotidae.

== Description ==
The height of the shell attains 22.5 mm, its diameter 42 mm.

== Distribution ==
This species was found in the state of Chiapas, Mexico.
