= Amphicyclotus parvus =

Scientific classification
- Kingdom: Animalia
- Phylum: Mollusca
- Class: Gastropoda
- Subclass: Caenogastropoda
- Order: Architaenioglossa
- Family: Neocyclotidae
- Genus: Amphicyclotus
- Species: A. parvus

Binomial name
- Amphicyclotus parvus F. G. Thompson, 1963

Species of gastropod

Amphicyclotus parvus is a species of tropical land snails with gills and an operculum, terrestrial gastropod mollusks in the family Neocyclotidae.

== Description ==
The height of the shell attains 12.2 mm (0.48 in), its diameter 19.3 mm (0.76 in).

== Distribution ==
This species is endemic to El Salvador
