= Amphicyclotus paulsonorum =

Scientific classification
- Kingdom: Animalia
- Phylum: Mollusca
- Class: Gastropoda
- Subclass: Caenogastropoda
- Order: Architaenioglossa
- Family: Neocyclotidae
- Genus: Amphicyclotus
- Species: A. paulsonorum

Binomial name
- Amphicyclotus paulsonorum F. G. Thompson, 1969

Species of gastropod

Amphicyclotus paulsonorum is a species of tropical land snails with gills and an operculum, terrestrial gastropod mollusks in the family Neocyclotidae.

== Description ==
The height of the shell attains 13.7 mm, its diameter 20.5 mm.

== Distribution ==
This species was found in the state Chiapas, Mexico.
