= Paramiella incisa =

Conservation status
- Data Deficient (IUCN 2.3)

Scientific classification
- Kingdom: Animalia
- Phylum: Mollusca
- Class: Gastropoda
- Subclass: Caenogastropoda
- Order: Architaenioglossa
- Family: Neocyclotidae
- Genus: Paramiella
- Species: P. incisa

Binomial name
- Paramiella incisa (Hombron & Jacquinot, 1848)

Species of gastropod

Paramiella incisa is a species of a land snail with gills and an operculum, a terrestrial gastropod mollusk in the family Neocyclotidae. This species is endemic to Micronesia.
