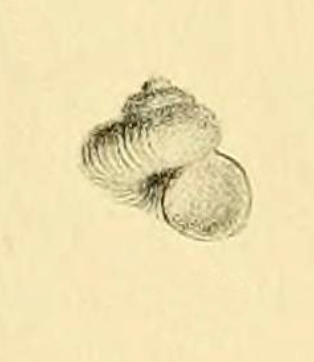
- Shell of Amphicyclotus cinereus (holotype)

Scientific classification
- Kingdom: Animalia
- Phylum: Mollusca
- Class: Gastropoda
- Subclass: Caenogastropoda
- Order: Architaenioglossa
- Family: Neocyclotidae
- Genus: Amphicyclotus
- Species: A. cinereus

Binomial name
- Amphicyclotus cinereus (Drouët, 1859)

Synonyms
- Cyclophorus cinereus Drouët, 1859 (original combination); Incerticyclus cinereus (Drouët, 1859) superseded combination

= Amphicyclotus cinereus =

Species of gastropod

Amphicyclotus cinereus is a species of tropical land snails with gills and an operculum, terrestrial gastropod mollusks in the family Neocyclotidae.

== Description ==
The diameter of the shell attains 4.5 mm.

(Original description in Latin) This small, umbilicate, subturbinate shell is thin, faintly translucent, and finely striated, exhibiting an ash-gray coloration. It consists of four convex whorls with an obtuse apex. The aperture is angular-circular, and the peristome is simple and acute. The operculum is immersed, concolorous, and typical.

== Distribution ==
This species was found in French Guiana and Martinique.
