= Paramiella kondoi =

Conservation status
- Data Deficient (IUCN 2.3)

Scientific classification
- Kingdom: Animalia
- Phylum: Mollusca
- Class: Gastropoda
- Subclass: Caenogastropoda
- Order: Architaenioglossa
- Family: Neocyclotidae
- Genus: Paramiella
- Species: P. kondoi

Binomial name
- Paramiella kondoi (Clench, 1949)

Species of gastropod

Paramiella kondoi is a species of a land snail with gills and an operculum, a terrestrial gastropod mollusk in the family Neocyclotidae. This species is endemic to Micronesia.
