= Amphicyclotus gayi =

Scientific classification
- Kingdom: Animalia
- Phylum: Mollusca
- Class: Gastropoda
- Subclass: Caenogastropoda
- Order: Architaenioglossa
- Family: Neocyclotidae
- Genus: Amphicyclotus
- Species: A. gayi

Binomial name
- Amphicyclotus gayi (Hupée, 1854)

Synonyms
- Cyclostoma gayi Hupée, 1854 (original combination)

Species of gastropod

Amphicyclotus gayi is a species of tropical land snails with gills and an operculum, terrestrial gastropod mollusks in the family Neocyclotidae.

== Description ==
The height of the shell attains 1 mm, its diameter 1.5 mm.

(Original description in Spanish) This small, somewhat discoidal, thick shell consists of three rounded, convex whorls. It features a barely perceptible obtuse keel above and a distinct keel medially on the outer side of the body whorl. The spire is obtuse, with deep sutures.

The aperture is large, rounded, and entire, with sharp edges slightly thickened internally by a vitreous deposit. The umbilicus is small and rounded.

The shell is uniformly ferruginous brown, and the aperture is whitish inside. The operculum is thin and corneous.

== Distribution ==
This species was found in northern Chile. It is missing, presumed lost.
