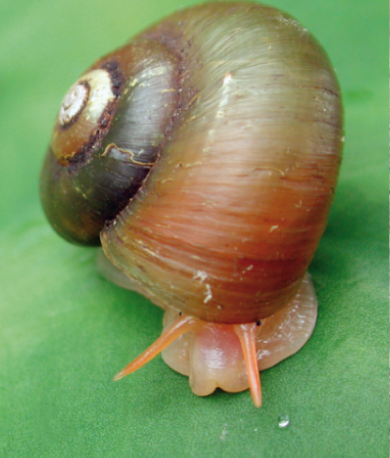
- Amphicyclotulus amethystinus.
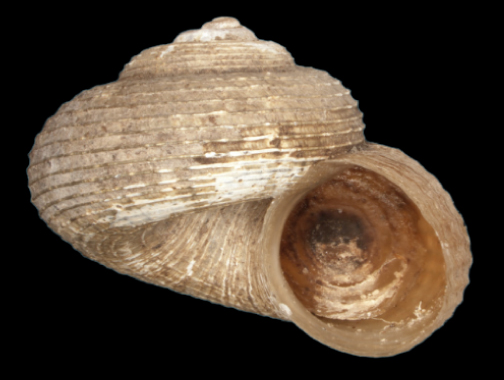
- Apertural view of the shell of Amphicyclotulus dominicensis. Width of the shell is 11.8 mm.

Scientific classification
- Kingdom: Animalia
- Phylum: Mollusca
- Class: Gastropoda
- Subclass: Caenogastropoda
- Order: Architaenioglossa
- Family: Neocyclotidae
- Genus: Amphicyclotulus; Kobelt, 1912

Synonyms
- Amphicyclotulus (Amphicyclotulus) Kobelt, 1912 · alternative representation; Amphicyclotulus (Cycloblandia) Bartsch, 1942 · alternative representation

= Amphicyclotulus =

Genus of gastropods

Amphicyclotulus is a genus of tropical land snails with gills and an operculum, terrestrial gastropod molluscs in the family Neocyclotidae (according to the taxonomy of the Gastropoda by Bouchet & Rocroi, 2005).

== Species ==
Species within the genus Amphicyclotulus include:

- Amphicyclotulus amethystinus (Guppy, 1868)
- Amphicyclotulus beauianus (Petit, 1853)
- Amphicyclotulus dominicensis Bartsch, 1942
- Amphicyclotulus guadeloupensis de la Torre, Bartsch & Morrison, 1942
- Amphicyclotulus martinicensis (Shuttleworth, 1857)
- Amphicyclotulus mineri Bartsch, 1942
- Amphicyclotulus perplexus de la Torre, Bartsch & Morrison, 1942
- Amphicyclotulus portoricensis (O. Boettger, 1887)
- Amphicyclotulus rufescens (G. B. Sowerby I, 1843)
- Amphicyclotulus schrammi (Shuttleworth, 1857)

Synonyms

- Amphicyclotulus acutiliratus (Drouët, 1859): synonym of Amphicyclotulus rufescens (G. B. Sowerby I, 1843) (junior subjective synonym)
- Amphicyclotulus liratus Droüet, 1859: synonym of Amphicyclotulus martinicensis (Shuttleworth, 1857) (junior subjective synonym)

== See also ==
- Amphicyclotus is a different genus in the same family Neocyclotidae.
