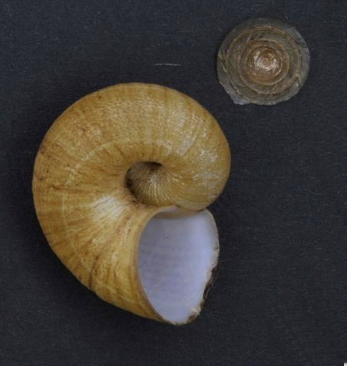
- Shell of Amphicyclotus boucardi (specimen at Naturalis Biodiversity Center)

Scientific classification
- Kingdom: Animalia
- Phylum: Mollusca
- Class: Gastropoda
- Subclass: Caenogastropoda
- Order: Architaenioglossa
- Family: Neocyclotidae
- Genus: Amphicyclotus
- Species: A. boucardi

Binomial name
- Amphicyclotus boucardi (L. Pfeiffer, 1857)

Synonyms
- Cyclostoma (Cyclophorus) boucardi L. Pfeiffer, 1857 (original combination)

= Amphicyclotus boucardi =

Species of gastropod

Amphicyclotus boucardi is a species of tropical land snails with gills and an operculum, terrestrial gastropod mollusks in the family Neocyclotidae.

== Description ==
The height of the shell attains 19 mm, its diameter 35 mm.

The shell is broadly umbilicate, depressed-conical, and quite solid. Its entire surface is marked by malleations, creating a distinctly rough texture, and subtle, spaced, obsolete striae. The shell is olive-white, covered by a thin, persistent, light tawny-brown epidermis with contrasting whitish spiral bands.

The spire is briefly conical, terminating in an obtuse apex that is purplish-pink transitioning to tawny. The suture is well-defined and deep. The shell has 5.5 moderately convex, rapidly expanding whorls, with the body whorl rounded and slightly flattened basally, where the epidermis becomes light olive-green. The aperture is slightly oblique, subangular-rounded, and glossy white internally. The peristome is simple, straight, and very slightly angled at its upper part, which extends beyond the columellar edge. It is continuous and shares the aperture's coloration, except for the epidermal-colored outer margin. The edges are joined by a thin callus deposit. The columellar edge is slightly arcuate, subdilated, and slightly thickened internally, but remains thin at its outer margin. The basal and outer edges are sharp.

The operculum is orbicular, thin at the edge but solid centrally, corneous in texture and light tawny. Its outer surface has numerous tightly coiled whorls, which abruptly terminate, and a concave central region. The whorl edges form a lamelliform projection. The inner surface is thickened centrally, forming a convex, salient, flattened nipple-like structure, surrounded by distinct concentric striae. The remaining surface is smooth and polished.

== Distribution ==
This species was found in the state Vera Cruz, Mexico.
