= Amphicyclotus vesconesi =

Scientific classification
- Kingdom: Animalia
- Phylum: Mollusca
- Class: Gastropoda
- Subclass: Caenogastropoda
- Order: Architaenioglossa
- Family: Neocyclotidae
- Genus: Amphicyclotus
- Species: A. vesconesi

Binomial name
- Amphicyclotus vesconesi (Jousseaume, 1897)

Synonyms
- Cyclophorus vesconesi Jousseaume, 1897 (original combination)

Species of gastropod

Amphicyclotus vesconesi is a species of tropical land snails with gills and an operculum, terrestrial gastropod mollusks in the family Neocyclotidae.

== Description ==
The height of the shell attains 15 mm, its diameter 29 mm.

(Original description in German) A widely and deeply umbilicate shell, characterized by a cord-like keel surrounding the umbilicus. It is low-conical, glossy, and robust.

It displays fine striations and a distinct two-toned coloration: yellow-brown on the dorsal surface and blackish-green on the ventral surface. The apex is abraded, and the suture is deeply channeled.

The shell comprises five minimally angular whorls, with the body whorl slightly widened anteriorly. The aperture is nearly circular, angular at its superior margin, and exhibits an incision at the umbilical keel. Internally, the aperture is whitish with a black band. The peristome is simple and subtly depressed.

The operculum is tightly coiled, with lamellate margins.

== Distribution ==
This species was found in Colombia.
