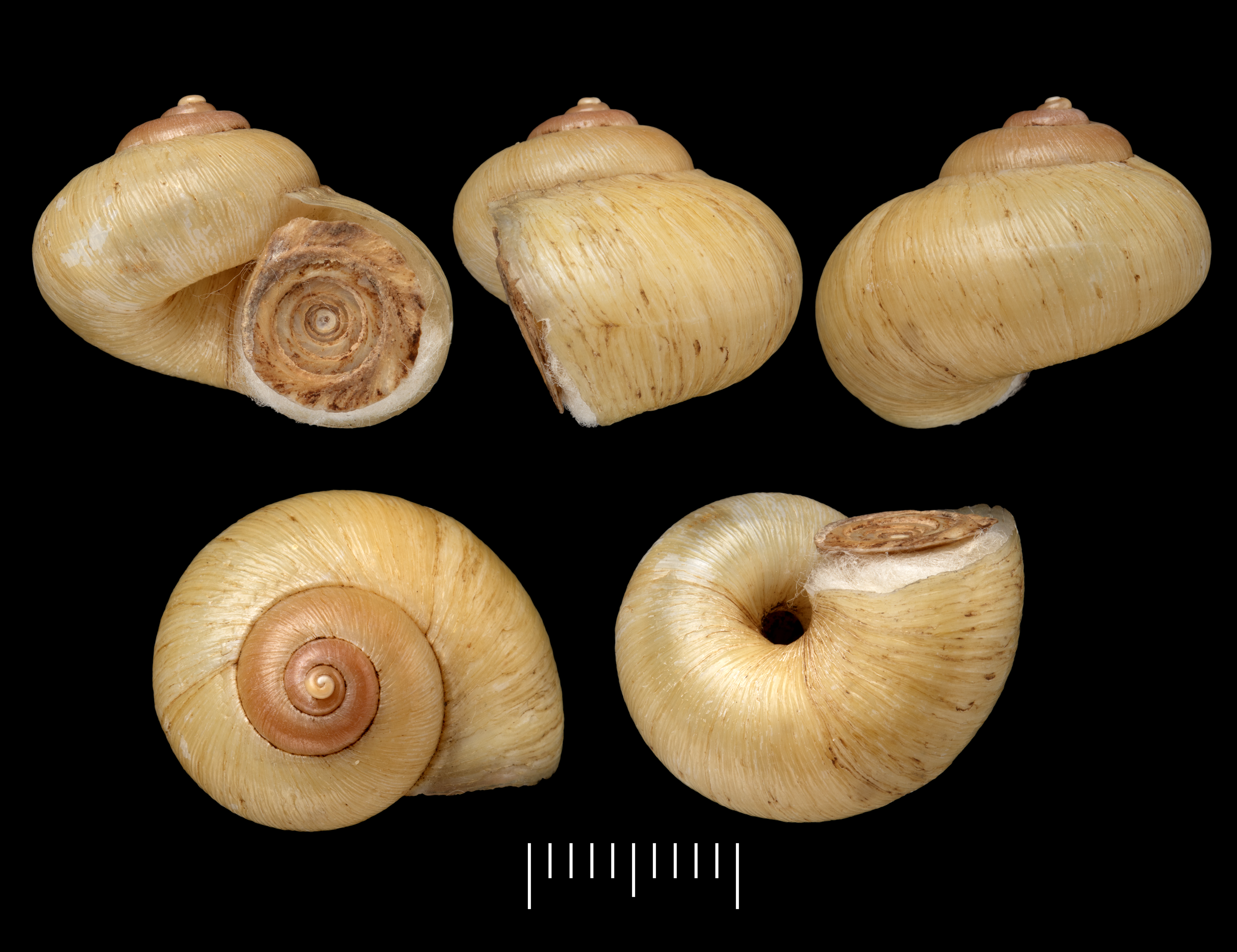
- NHMUK 1864.12.17.2, SYNTYPE, Original name "Cyclotus trinitensis Guppy, 1864".

Scientific classification
- Domain: Eukaryota
- Kingdom: Animalia
- Phylum: Mollusca
- Class: Gastropoda
- Subclass: Caenogastropoda
- Order: Architaenioglossa
- Superfamily: Cyclophoroidea
- Family: Neocyclotidae
- Genus: Aperostoma
- Species: A. translucidum
- Subspecies: A. t. trinitense

Trinomial name
- Aperostoma translucidum trinitense (Guppy, 1864)

Synonyms
- Aperostoma (Cyclohidalgoa) translucidum trinitense; Cyclotus trinitensis; Neocyclotus translucidus trinitensis

= Aperostoma translucidum trinitense =

Aperostoma translucidum trinitense is a subspecies of tropical land snail with gills and an operculum, terrestrial gastropod mollusk in the family Neocyclotidae.

This species is found in Trinidad, Tobago and the Paria Peninsula of Venezuela.
