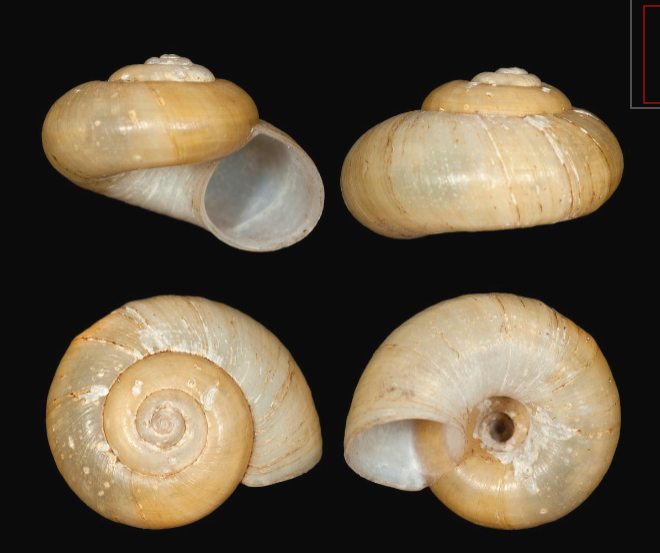
- Shell of Amphicyclotulus guadeloupensis (holotype at the Smithsonian Institution)

Conservation status
- Extinct (IUCN 2.3)

Scientific classification
- Kingdom: Animalia
- Phylum: Mollusca
- Class: Gastropoda
- Subclass: Caenogastropoda
- Order: Architaenioglossa
- Family: Neocyclotidae
- Genus: Amphicyclotulus
- Species: †A. guadeloupensis

Binomial name
- †Amphicyclotulus guadeloupensis de la Torre, Bartsch & Morrison, 1942
- Location of Guadeloupe

Synonyms
- Amphicyclotulus (Amphicyclotulus) guadeloupensis Bartsch, 1942 alternative representation

= Amphicyclotulus guadeloupensis =

Species of gastropod

Amphicyclotulus guadeloupensis was a species of tropical land snail with a gill and an operculum, a terrestrial gastropod mollusk in the family Neocyclotidae.

== Distribution ==
This species was at the moment of discovery still endemic to Guadeloupe. This land snail is now extinct.
