= Daronia spirula =

- Drawing with two views of a shell of D. spirula

Scientific classification
- Kingdom: Animalia
- Phylum: Mollusca
- Class: Gastropoda
- Subclass: Caenogastropoda
- Order: Architaenioglossa
- Family: Neocyclotidae
- Genus: Daronia
- Species: D. spirula

Binomial name
- Daronia spirula (A. Adams, 1850)

Synonyms
- Cyclostrema spirula A. Adams, 1850

Species of gastropod

Daronia spirula is a species of land snail, a gastropod mollusc in the family Neocyclotidae. Originally named Cyclostrema spirula, the combination was later superseded and it was accepted as D. spirula.

== Taxonomy ==
Examination (Warén & Bouchet 1988) of the holotype of Daronia spirula revealed that it is a land snail belonging to the family Neocyclotidae (synonym: Poteriidae). Furthermore, it is so similar to Buckleyia martinezi (Hidalgo), the type species of this genus, that we do not hesitate to consider it an older synonym of Daronia (synonym: Buckleyia).

== Description ==
The planorbular, white shell is cancellated with elevated, decussating transverse and longitudinal lines. It is very widely umbilicated. The spire is excavated. The whorls are rapidly increasing, spirally striated, with a sloping, smooth sutural margin. The body whorl becomes disjointed. The large aperture is round and cancellated with the lips. The cancelli are transversely striated. The outer margin of the periphery is crenate.

== Distribution ==
This terrestrial species occurs on beaches of the Philippines.
