= Farcimen tortum =

Scientific classification
- Kingdom: Animalia
- Phylum: Mollusca
- Class: Gastropoda
- Subclass: Caenogastropoda
- Order: Architaenioglossa
- Family: Megalomastomatidae
- Genus: Farcimen
- Species: F. tortum

Binomial name
- Farcimen tortum (Wood, 1828)

Species of gastropod

Farcimen tortum is a species of a land snail, terrestrial gastropod mollusk in the family Megalomastomatidae.

== Distribution ==
This species is found in Cuba.

== Ecology ==
Farcimen tortum is a ground dwelling species.

Predators of Farcimen tortum include larvae of firefly bug Alecton discoidalis.
