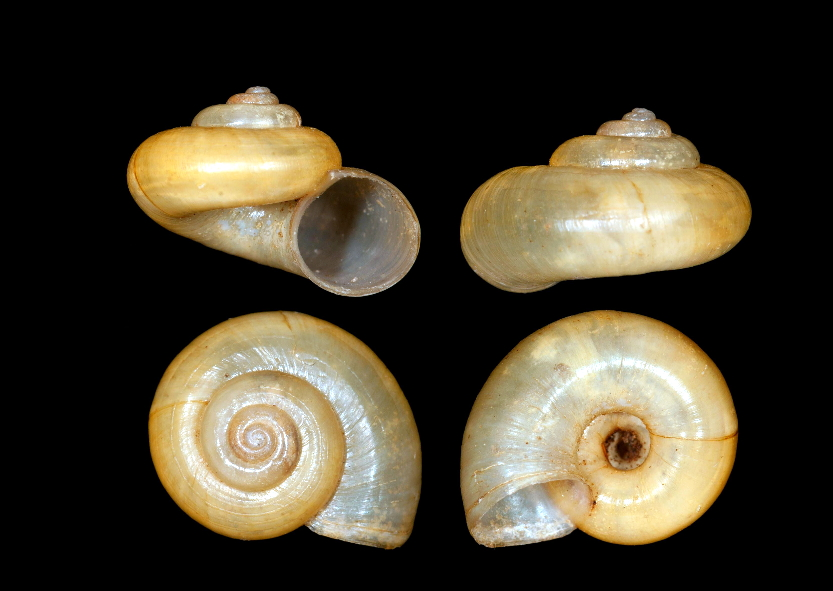
- Shell of Amphicyclotulus perplexus (holotype at the National Museum of Natural History, Smithsonian Institution)

Conservation status
- Vulnerable (IUCN 2.3)

Scientific classification
- Kingdom: Animalia
- Phylum: Mollusca
- Class: Gastropoda
- Subclass: Caenogastropoda
- Order: Architaenioglossa
- Family: Neocyclotidae
- Genus: Amphicyclotulus
- Species: A. perplexus

Binomial name
- Amphicyclotulus perplexus de la Torre, Bartsch & Morrison, 1942

Synonyms
- Amphicyclotulus (Amphicyclotulus) perplexus Bartsch, 1942 alternative representation

= Amphicyclotulus perplexus =

Species of gastropod

Amphicyclotulus perplexus is a species of tropical land snail with a gill and an operculum, a terrestrial gastropod mollusc in the family Neocyclotidae.

This land snail species is vulnerable to the possibility of extinction.

== Description ==
The height of the shell attains 7 mm, its diameter 11.5 mm.

== Distribution ==
This species is endemic to the island of Guadeloupe, West Indies.
