= Procer =

Procer may refer to:

- Megascolia procer, a solitary wasp in the family Scoliidae
- Farcimen procer, a species of Farcimen
- Diplocephalus procer; see List of Linyphiidae species (A–H)

== See also ==
- Prócer (disambiguation)
