= Amphicyclotus palenquensis =

Scientific classification
- Kingdom: Animalia
- Phylum: Mollusca
- Class: Gastropoda
- Subclass: Caenogastropoda
- Order: Architaenioglossa
- Family: Neocyclotidae
- Genus: Amphicyclotus
- Species: A. palenquensis

Binomial name
- Amphicyclotus palenquensis (Pilsbry, 1935)

Synonyms
- Aperostoma (Amphicyclotus) palenquense Pilsbry, 1935; Aperostoma palenquensis Pilsbry, 1935 (original combination); Megacyclotus palenquensis (Pilsbry, 1935)

Species of gastropod

Amphicyclotus palenquensis is a species of tropical land snails with gills and an operculum, terrestrial gastropod mollusks in the family Neocyclotidae.

== Distribution ==
This species was found in the Mexican states of Chiapas and Veracruz.
