= Incerticyclus cinereus =

Conservation status
- Extinct (IUCN 2.3)

Scientific classification
- Kingdom: Animalia
- Phylum: Mollusca
- Class: Gastropoda
- Subclass: Caenogastropoda
- Order: Architaenioglossa
- Superfamily: Cyclophoroidea
- Family: Neocyclotidae
- Genus: Incerticyclus
- Species: †I. cinereus

Binomial name
- †Incerticyclus cinereus Droüet, 1859

Species of gastropod

†Incerticyclus cinereus was a species of tropical land snail with gills and an operculum, a terrestrial gastropod mollusk in the family Neocyclotidae.

This species was endemic to Martinique. It is now extinct.
