= Incerticyclus martinicensis =

Conservation status
- Extinct (IUCN 2.3)

Scientific classification
- Kingdom: Animalia
- Phylum: Mollusca
- Class: Gastropoda
- Subclass: Caenogastropoda
- Order: Architaenioglossa
- Family: Neocyclotidae
- Genus: Incerticyclus
- Species: †I. martinicensis

Binomial name
- †Incerticyclus martinicensis Shuttleworth, 1857

Species of gastropod

†Incerticyclus martinicensis was a species of tropical land snail with gills and an operculum, a terrestrial gastropod mollusk in the family Neocyclotidae.

This species was endemic to Martinique. It is now extinct.
