= Kondorhaphe =

Scientific classification
- Kingdom: Animalia
- Phylum: Mollusca
- Class: Gastropoda
- Subclass: Caenogastropoda
- Order: Architaenioglossa
- Family: Neocyclotidae
- Genus: Kondoraphe; Clench, 1949
- Species: K. kiyokoae

Binomial name
- Kondorhaphe kiyokoae Clench, 1949

Genus of gastropods

Kondorhaphe is a monotypic genus of tropical land snails with gills and an operculum, terrestrial gastropod mollusks in the family Neocyclotidae. It is found in the Federated States of Micronesia. Its sole accepted species is Kondorhaphe kiyokoae.
