= Incerticyclus =

Scientific classification
- Kingdom: Animalia
- Phylum: Mollusca
- Class: Gastropoda
- Subclass: Caenogastropoda
- Order: Architaenioglossa
- Family: Neocyclotidae
- Genus: Incerticyclus; Morrison, 1955

Genus of gastropods

Incerticyclus is a genus of tropical land snails with gills and an operculum, terrestrial gastropod mollusks. They are a part of the informal group Architaenioglossa, belonging to the clade Caenogastropoda (according to the taxonomy of the Gastropoda by Bouchet & Rocroi, 2005).

== Species ==
Species within the genus Incerticyclus include:

- Incerticyclus cinereus
- Incerticyclus martinicensis
- Incerticyclus perpallidus
- Incerticyclus prominulus
