= Daronia =

- Drawing with two views of a shell of D. spirula

Scientific classification
- Kingdom: Animalia
- Phylum: Mollusca
- Class: Gastropoda
- Subclass: Caenogastropoda
- Order: Architaenioglossa
- Family: Neocyclotidae
- Genus: Daronia; A. Adams, 1861

Synonyms
- Aperostoma (Buckleyia) E. T. Higgins, 1872 (junior synonymy); Buckleyia E. T. Higgins, 1872; Cyclostrema (Daronia) A. Adams, 1861; Vitrinella (Daronia) A. Adams, 1861

Species of gastropod

Daronia is a genus of land snails, gastropod molluscs in the family Neocyclotidae.

== Taxonomy ==
Six species are accepted within Daronia:

- Daronia bicincta (Bartsch & J. P. E. Morrison, 1942)
- Daronia bifasciata (Mousson, 1873)
- Daronia haughti (J. P. E. Morrison, 1955)
- Daronia hoffmeisteri Ladd, 1970 †
- Daronia martinezi (Hidalgo, 1866)
- Daronia spirula (A. Adams, 1850)

Synonyms:

- Daronia monterosatoi van Aartsen & Bogi, 1987: synonym of Rugulina monterosatoi (van Aartsen & Bogi, 1987) (original combination)
- † Daronia punctata A. W. Janssen, 1967: synonym of Tjaernoeia exquisita (Jeffreys, 1883)
- Daronia subdisjuncta (H. Adams, 1868): synonym of Tubiola subdisjuncta (H. Adams, 1868)
- Daronia yokoyamai Oyama, 1973: synonym of Circulus choshiensis (T. Habe, 1961)
