= Paramiella =

Scientific classification
- Kingdom: Animalia
- Phylum: Mollusca
- Class: Gastropoda
- Subclass: Caenogastropoda
- Order: Architaenioglossa
- Family: Neocyclotidae
- Genus: Paramiella; Clench, 1954

Genus of gastropods

Paramiella is a genus of land snails with gills and an operculum, a terrestrial gastropod mollusk in the family Neocyclotidae.

== Species ==
Species within the genus Paramiella include:

- Paramiella incisa
- Paramiella kondoi
