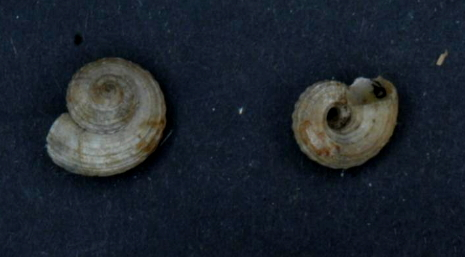
- Shell of Amphicyclotulus rufescens (specimen at Naturalis Biodiversity Center)

Scientific classification
- Kingdom: Animalia
- Phylum: Mollusca
- Class: Gastropoda
- Subclass: Caenogastropoda
- Order: Architaenioglossa
- Family: Neocyclotidae
- Genus: Amphicyclotulus
- Species: A. rufescens

Binomial name
- Amphicyclotulus rufescens (G. B. Sowerby I, 1843)

Synonyms
- Amphicyclotulus (Amphicyclotulus) acutiliratus (Drouët, 1859) junior subjective synonym; Amphicyclotulus (Amphicyclotulus) rufescens (G. B. Sowerby I, 1843) alternative representation; Amphicyclotulus acutiliratus (Drouët, 1859) junior subjective synonym; Amphicyclotus acutiliratus (Drouët, 1859) junior subjective synonym; Amphicyclotus rufescens (G. B. Sowerby I, 1843) (unaccepted combination); Cyclophorus acutiliratus Drouët, 1859 junior subjective synonym; Cyclostoma rufescens G. B. Sowerby I, 1843 (original combination)

= Amphicyclotulus rufescens =

Species of gastropod

Amphicyclotulus rufescens is a species of tropical land snail with a gill and an operculum, a terrestrial gastropod mollusc in the family Neocyclotidae.

== Description ==
(Original description) The shell, nearly orbicular in outline and predominantly reddish in coloration, possesses a short spire composed of four rounded whorls. These whorls exhibit spiral ridges and striations, with the ridges displaying crenulations. The suture is deeply impressed. The aperture is circular, defined by a thin, sharp peritreme. The umbilicus is notably large.

== Distribution ==
This Caribbean species is endemic to the island of Martinique.
