= Crocidopoma =

Scientific classification
- Kingdom: Animalia
- Phylum: Mollusca
- Class: Gastropoda
- Subclass: Caenogastropoda
- Order: Architaenioglossa
- Family: Neocyclotidae
- Genus: Crocidopoma; Shuttleworth, 1856

Genus of gastropods

Crocidopoma is a genus of land snails with an operculum, terrestrial gastropod mollusks in the family Neocyclotidae.

== Species ==
Species within the genus Crocidopoma include:

- Crocidopoma gunglachi Torre & Bartsch, 1942
- Crocidopoma perdistinctum (Gundlach, 1858)
