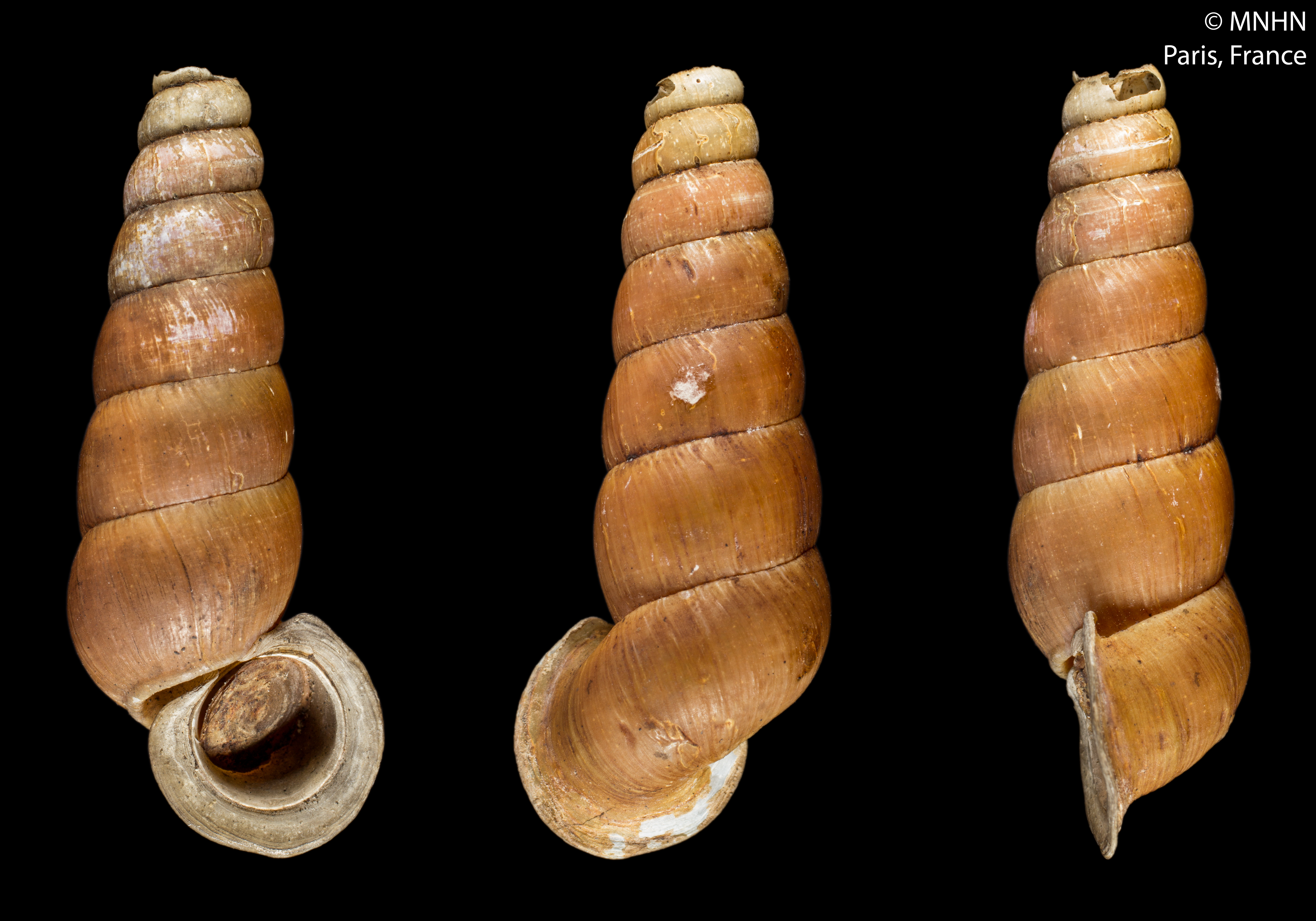
- Shell of Tomocyclus simulacrum

Scientific classification
- Kingdom: Animalia
- Phylum: Mollusca
- Class: Gastropoda
- Subclass: Caenogastropoda
- Order: Architaenioglossa
- Superfamily: Cyclophoroidea
- Family: Megalomastomatidae; Blanford, 1864

Synonyms
- Megalostomatidae [sic] · (misspelling); Neopupininae Kobelt, 1902; Hainesiinae Thiele, 1929

= Megalomastomatidae =

Family of gastropods

Megalomastomatidae is a family of tropical land snails with an operculum, terrestrial gastropod mollusks in the superfamily Cyclophoroidea (according to the taxonomy of the Gastropoda by Bouchet & Rocroi, 2005).

== Genera ==
Genera within the family Megalomastomatidae include:

- Cyclopomops Bartsch & J. P. E. Morrison, 1942
- Farcimen Troschel, 1847
- Farcimoides Bartsch, 1942
- Hainesia L. Pfeffer, 1856: belongs to the subfamily Cyclophoridae incertae sedis
- Megalomastoma Swainson, 1840 - the type genus of the family Megalomastomatidae
- Neopupina Kobelt, 1902
- Tomocyclus Crosse & P. Fischer, 1872

Synonyms

- Cyclopoma Troschel, 1847: synonym of Cyclopomops Bartsch & J. P. E. Morrison, 1942 (invalid: not Agassiz, 1833 [Pisces]; Cyclopomops is a replacement name)
- Cyrtotoma Mörch, 1852: synonym of Aperostoma Troschel, 1847 (invalid: objective junior synonym)
- Habropoma Crosse & P. Fischer, 1880: synonym of Aperostoma Troschel, 1847 (invalid: objective junior synonym)
- Lomastoma S. P. Woodward, 1856: synonym of Megalomastoma Swainson, 1840
- Megaloma S. P. Woodward, 1854: synonym of Megalomastoma Swainson, 1840
- Megalostoma [sic]: synonym of Megalomastoma Swainson, 1840 (misspelling of original genus name, Megalomastoma Swainson, 1840)
- Megalostomatinae [sic]: synonym of Megalomastomatinae W. T. Blanford, 1864 (misspelling)
- Subfamily Cochlostomatinae Kobelt, 1902: synonym of Cochlostomatidae Kobelt, 1902
- Subfamily Neopupininae Kobelt, 1902: synonym of Megalomastomatinae W. T. Blanford, 1864
