= United Nations Security Council Resolution 156 =

United Nations Security Council resolution

UN Security Council Resolution 156
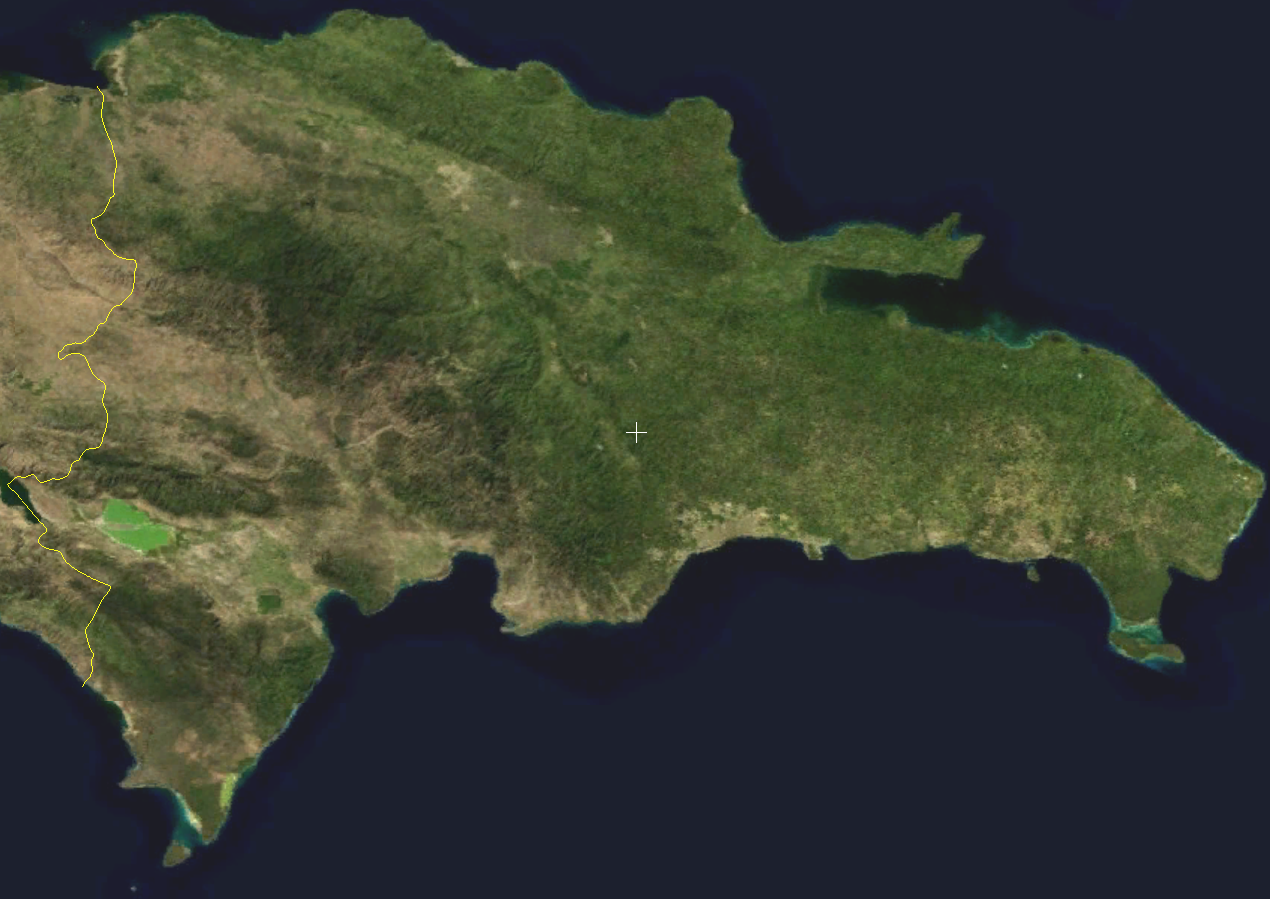
- Map of the Dominican Republic
- Date: September 9 1960
- Meeting no.: 895
- Code: S/4491 (Document)
- Subject: Question relating to the Dominican Republic
- Voting summary: 9 voted for; None voted against; 2 abstained
- Result: Adopted

Security Council composition
- Permanent members: China; France; Soviet Union; United Kingdom; United States
- Non-permanent members: Argentina; Ceylon; Ecuador; Italy; Poland; Tunisia

United Nations Security Council Resolution 156, adopted on September 9, 1960, after receiving a report from the Secretary-General of the Organization of American States (OAS) the Council noted its approval regarding the first resolution of the Meeting of Consultations of Ministers of Foreign Affairs of the American Republics whereby an agreement was reached on the application of measures regarding the Dominican Republic.

Following the OAS' decision to break off diplomatic relations and sanction the Trujillo regime after its involvement in an assassination attempt against President Rómulo Betancourt of Venezuela, the Soviet Union provided a text draft of the resolution, however this was rejected by other members of the Council due to the issue of non-military sanctions.

The resolution was adopted by nine votes to none; the People's Republic of Poland and Soviet Union abstained.

== See also ==
- List of United Nations Security Council Resolutions 101 to 200 (1953–1965)
- Assassination attempt of Rómulo Betancourt
