= Aperostoma =

Scientific classification
- Kingdom: Animalia
- Phylum: Mollusca
- Class: Gastropoda
- Subclass: Caenogastropoda
- Order: Architaenioglossa
- Family: Neocyclotidae
- Genus: Aperostoma; Troschel, 1847

Genus of gastropods

Aperostoma is a genus of gastropods belonging to the family Neocyclotidae.

The species of this genus are found in America.

Species:

- Aperostoma allantayum Bartsch & J.P.E.Morrison, 1942
- Aperostoma amazonense Bartsch & J.P.E.Morrison, 1942
- Aperostoma balsasense Bartsch & J.P.E.Morrison, 1942
- Aperostoma belli (Beddome, 1908)
- Aperostoma blanchetium (S.Moricand, 1826)
- Aperostoma bogotense (L.Pfeiffer, 1855)
- Aperostoma boliviense Bartsch & J.P.E.Morrison, 1942
- Aperostoma cardozi (H.B.Baker, 1923)
- Aperostoma carmioli Bartsch & J.P.E.Morrison, 1942
- Aperostoma castaneum Bartsch & J.P.E.Morrison, 1942
- Aperostoma caucaense (Da Costa, 1901)
- Aperostoma cingulatum (G.B.Sowerby I, 1843)
- Aperostoma columbiense (Da Costa, 1901)
- Aperostoma cumingi Bartsch & J.P.E.Morrison, 1942
- Aperostoma currani Bartsch & J.P.E.Morrison, 1942
- Aperostoma depressum (Da Costa, 1906)
- Aperostoma dilatatum Haas, 1955
- Aperostoma dunkeri (L.Pfeiffer, 1856)
- Aperostoma fasciatum (Kobelt, 1912)
- Aperostoma filoliratum (G.B.Sowerby Iii, 1892)
- Aperostoma fischeri (Hidalgo, 1867)
- Aperostoma fultoni Bartsch & J.P.E.Morrison, 1942
- Aperostoma inca (d'Orbigny, 1835)
- Aperostoma inconspicuum (G.B.Sowerby I, 1843)
- Aperostoma indecisum Haas, 1952
- Aperostoma laxatum (G.B.Sowerby I, 1850)
- Aperostoma leai Bartsch & J.P.E.Morrison, 1942
- Aperostoma masvense Bartsch & J.P.E.Morrison, 1942
- Aperostoma merrilli Bartsch & J.P.E.Morrison, 1942
- Aperostoma mexicanum (Menke, 1830)
- Aperostoma nanum Bartsch & J.P.E.Morrison, 1942
- Aperostoma nevadense Bartsch & J.P.E.Morrison, 1942
- Aperostoma olivaceum Bartsch & J.P.E.Morrison, 1942
- Aperostoma paezense Bartsch & J.P.E.Morrison, 1942
- Aperostoma paezicolum Bartsch & J.P.E.Morrison, 1942
- Aperostoma pailaense Bartsch & J.P.E.Morrison, 1942
- Aperostoma palmeri (Bartsch & J.P.E.Morrison, 1942)
- Aperostoma pazi (Crosse, 1866)
- Aperostoma perezi (Hidalgo, 1866)
- Aperostoma peruense Bartsch & J.P.E.Morrison, 1942
- Aperostoma peruvianum (Da Costa, 1906)
- Aperostoma popayanum (I.Lea, 1838)
- Aperostoma primigenia (Matheron, 1888)
- Aperostoma pulchellum Bartsch & J.P.E.Morrison, 1942
- Aperostoma redfieldi Bartsch & J.P.E.Morrison, 1942
- Aperostoma salengoense Bartsch & J.P.E.Morrison, 1942
- Aperostoma schunkei Haas, 1955
- Aperostoma smile Bartsch & J.P.E.Morrison, 1942
- Aperostoma subcingulatum (Kobelt, 1912)
- Aperostoma superstructum Haas, 1955
- Aperostoma translucidum (G.B.Sowerby I, 1843)
  - Aperostoma translucidum trinitense
- Aperostoma umbilicatum Bartsch & J.P.E.Morrison, 1942
- Aperostoma utriaense Bartsch & J.P.E.Morrison, 1942
- Aperostoma veracochanum Bartsch & J.P.E.Morrison, 1942
- Aperostoma viridulum Haas, 1952
- Aperostoma walkeri H.B.Baker, 1928
