= Avenida Reforma =

Avenue in Guatemala City

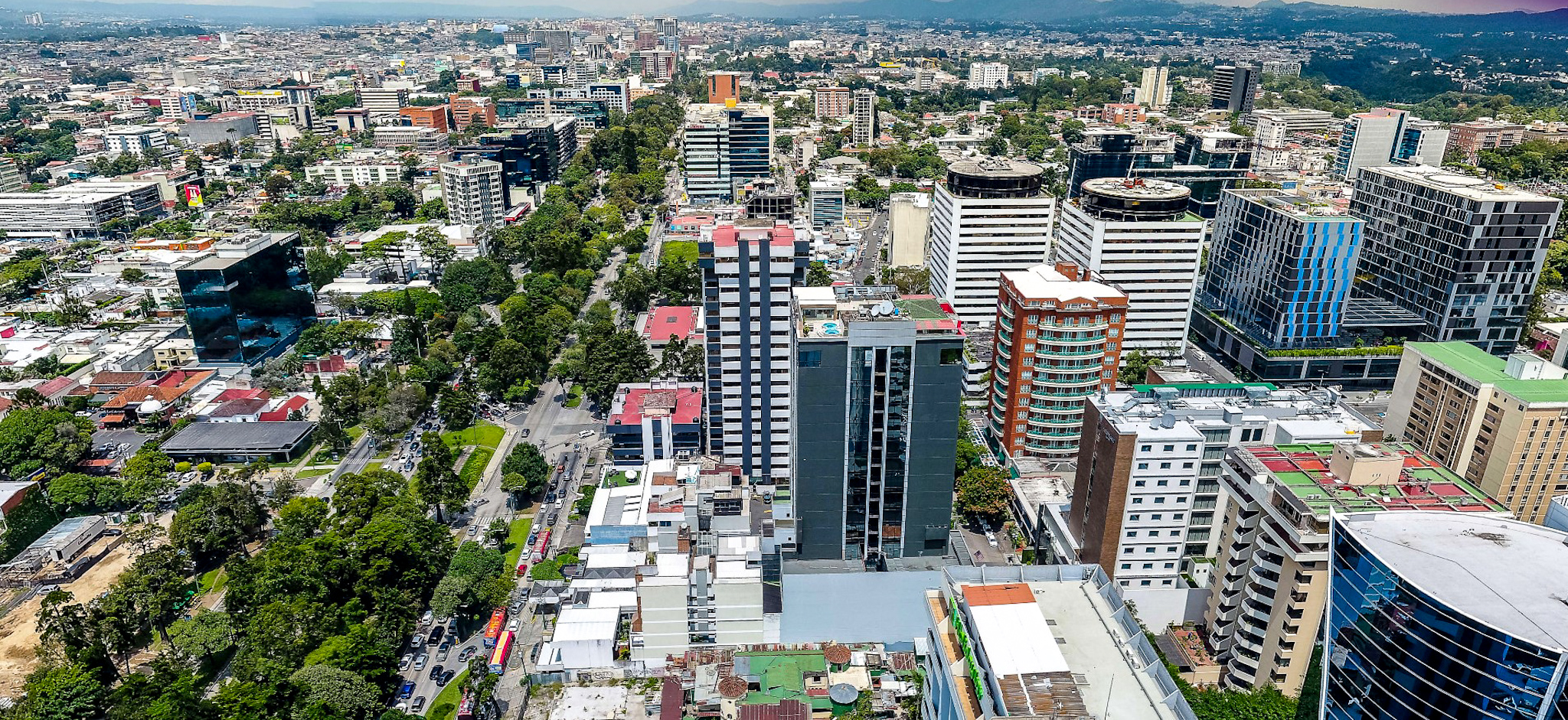
- Aerial view of Avenida Reforma.
- Interactive map of Avenida Reforma
- Former name(s): Boulevard 30 de Junio, Boulevard Reformador, Boulevard La Reforma, Paseo La Reforma
- Namesake: Justo Rufino Barrios, known as El Reformador
- Length: 2.26 km (1.40 mi)
- Location: Guatemala City, Guatemala
- Coordinates: 14.6053°N 90.5158°W
- North end: Obelisco

Construction
- Construction start: 1892
- Inauguration: 1895

Avenida Reforma ("Reform Avenue") is a main boulevard in the east-center part of Guatemala City, the capital of Guatemala. It is considered one of the main thoroughfares of Guatemala City. It is 2.26 km (1 mi) in length, and has an average width of 60 meters (197 ft) from sidewalk to sidewalk.

It runs from north to south, connecting the north-central areas of the city (Zones 1, 4, and 5) with the southern districts (Zones 9, 10, 13, and 14). It divides Zone 9 from Zone 10. The Zona Viva, where multiple modern buildings can be found, is adjacent to Avenida Reforma. The southern end is at the Obelisco, where it is continued by Avenida Las Americas.

== History ==
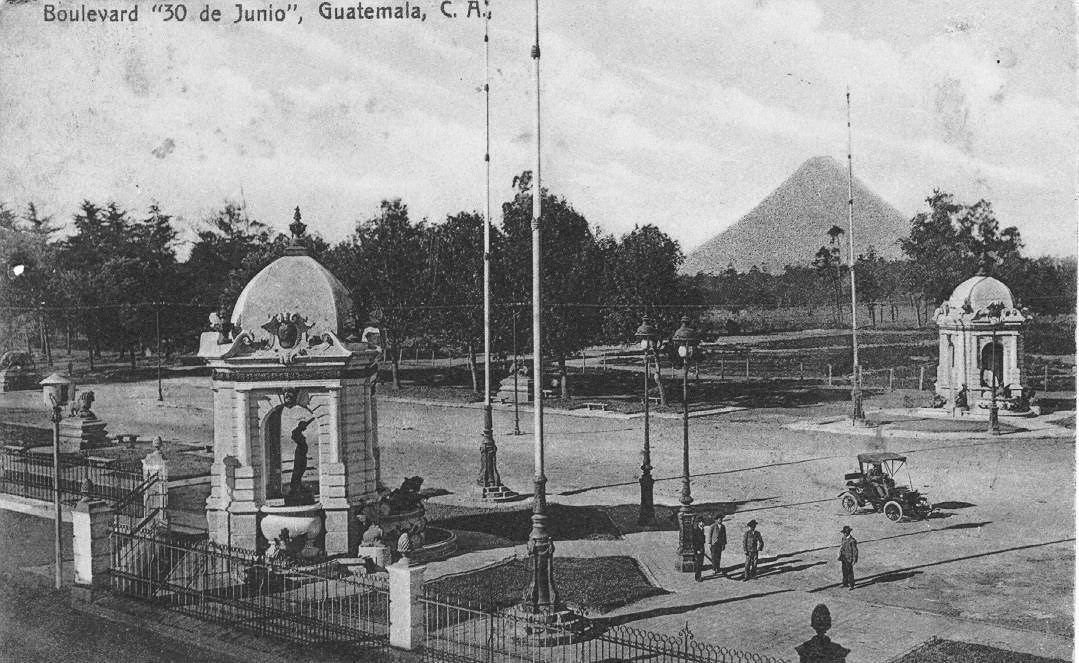
Boulevard 30 de junio in 1898

The Avenida Reforma was originally known as Boulevard 30 de Junio (June 30th), to commemorate the victory of the liberal forces of Miguel García Granados and Justo Rufino Barrios. Construction started in 1892, and it was inaugurated in 1895 under president José María Reina Barrios. President Reina Barrios had wanted to showcase Guatemala's economic boom for the 1897 Central American Expo; drawing inspiration from the Champs Elysées in Paris, he commissioned several sculptures and fountains from foreign artists. He also commissioned the Palacio de la Reforma, a French style palace that was located at the southern end of the boulevard and served as a museum. Incidentally, these expenses, among other reasons, caused an economic crisis in the country.

The 1917-1918 earthquakes destroyed many of the buildings along the boulevard, including the Reforma Palace. The southern end of the Avenida Reforma remained empty until 1935, when the Obelisco was built. Throughout the years, the Avenida Reforma has had several names; from its original name of Boulevard 30 de Junio it changed to Boulevard Reformador, then to Boulevard La Reforma, Paseo La Reforma, and its current name of Avenida Reforma. All of these names relate to the liberal reform of 1871.

== Today ==
Due to the aforementioned earthquakes, nowadays very few of the original buildings along the avenue remain; among them, the Escuela Politécnica (Guatemala's military academy) and a few Mission-style houses. Another notable building from the early years of the Avenida Reforma is the Asilo de Convalecientes Joaquina Estrada Cabrera, built in 1909. It was the first building to be restored after the earthquakes, and is now used as the offices of the Ministry of Education. Many of the residential homes have been replaced by modern buildings; it is now considered a business and commercial district. A cycleway was built along the avenue in 2013. Part of the Avenida Reforma is closed to traffic on Sunday mornings, as part of the Pasos y Pedales program implemented by the Guatemala City Municipality.

== Monuments ==
The Avenida Reforma's broad park-like median is lined with several monuments. Two statues, of Miguel Garcia Granados and Justo Rufino Barrios, were among the first monuments erected in 1896. The former is still located at its original place, in the intersection with 2nd Street. The latter was originally located in front of the Palacio de la Reforma; it was stored after the 1918 earthquakes, and has since been relocated to the railway museum in Zone 1.

Throughout the 20th century, more sculptures were added, honoring diverse people such as Henry Dunant, founder of the Red Cross; Miguel Hidalgo y Costilla and Benito Juárez, Mexican leaders; José Joaquín Palma and Rafael Álvarez Ovalle, creators of the national anthem of Guatemala; and Miguel Ángel Asturias, winner of the 1967 Nobel Prize in Literature. Other notable monuments are the Monumento a la Madre, which honors motherhood; the Star of David, located in the Israel Plaza; and several statues of animals such as lions, bulls, and wild boars.

== Gallery ==
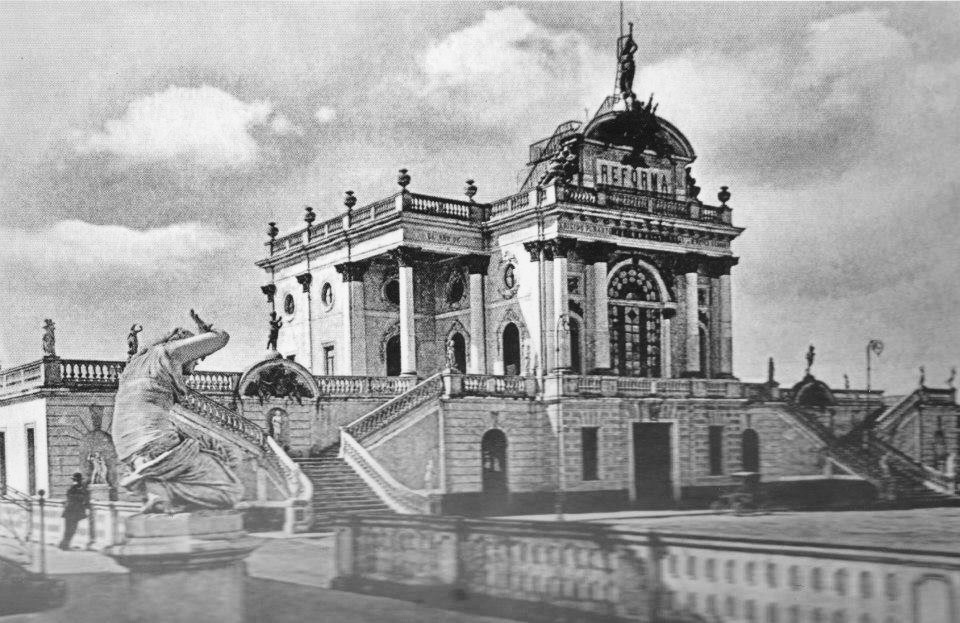
Palacio de la Reforma in 1900

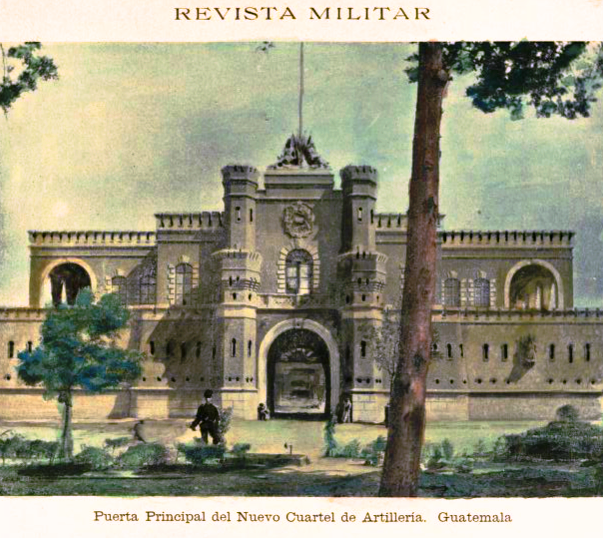
Escuela Politécnica in 1899. The building is still in use.

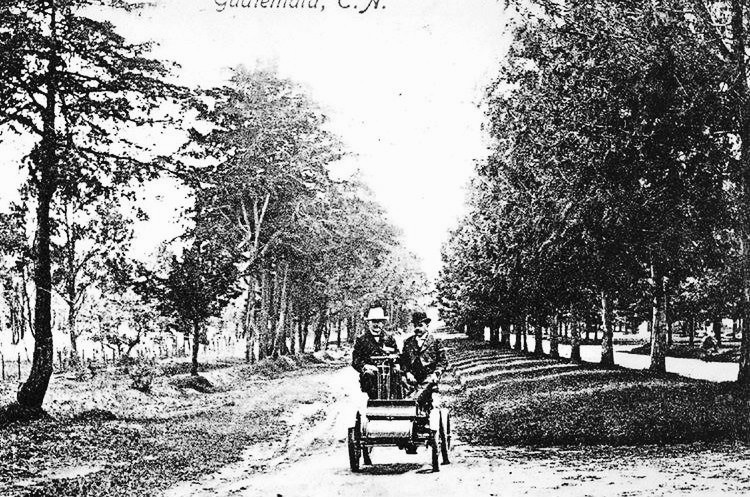
Avenida Reforma (then Paseo de la Reforma) in 1903.

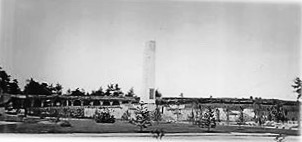
The Obelisco in 1935.

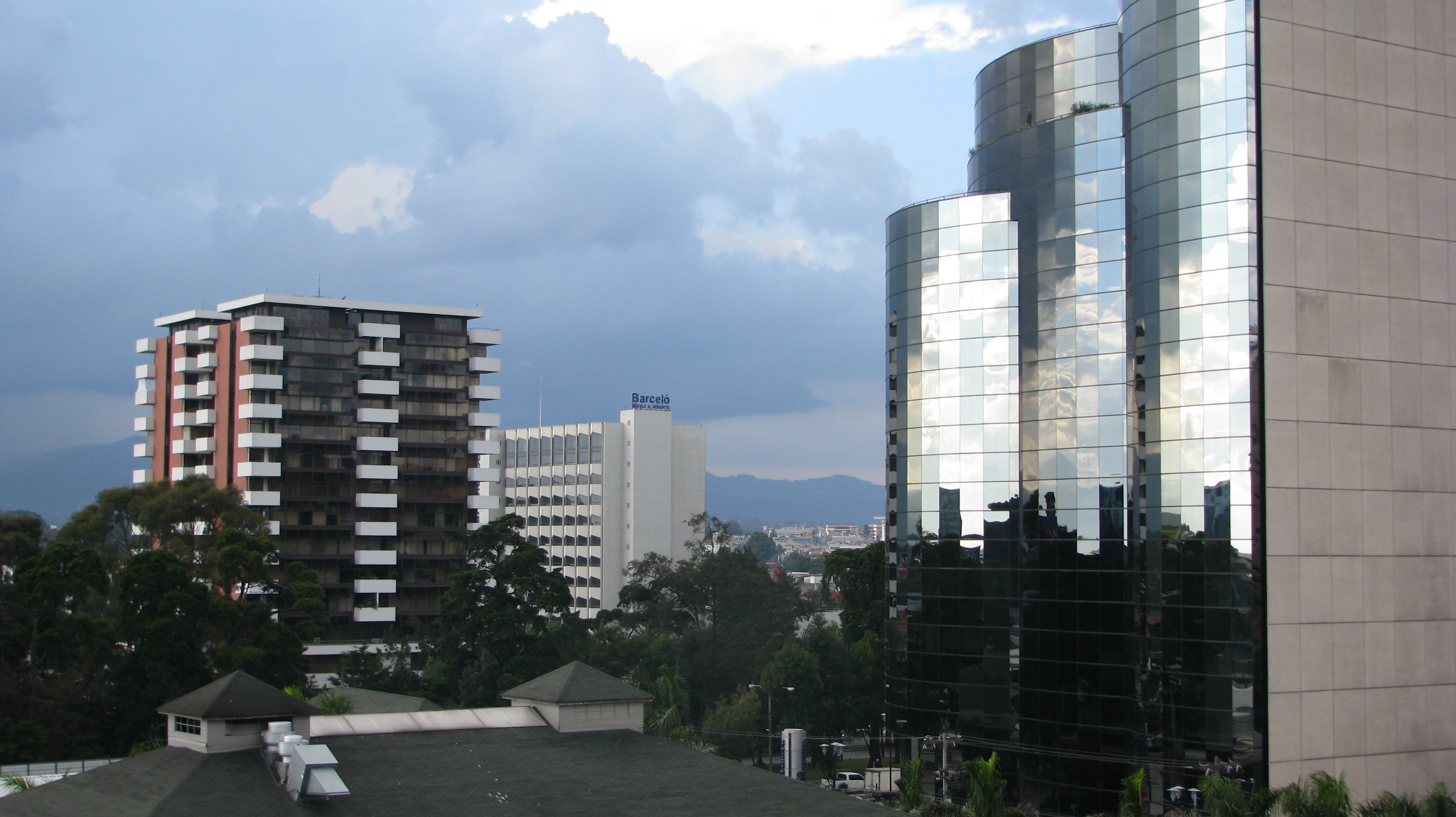
The Reforma Obelisco building (left), built in 1976, and the Torre Internacional (right), built in 1997.

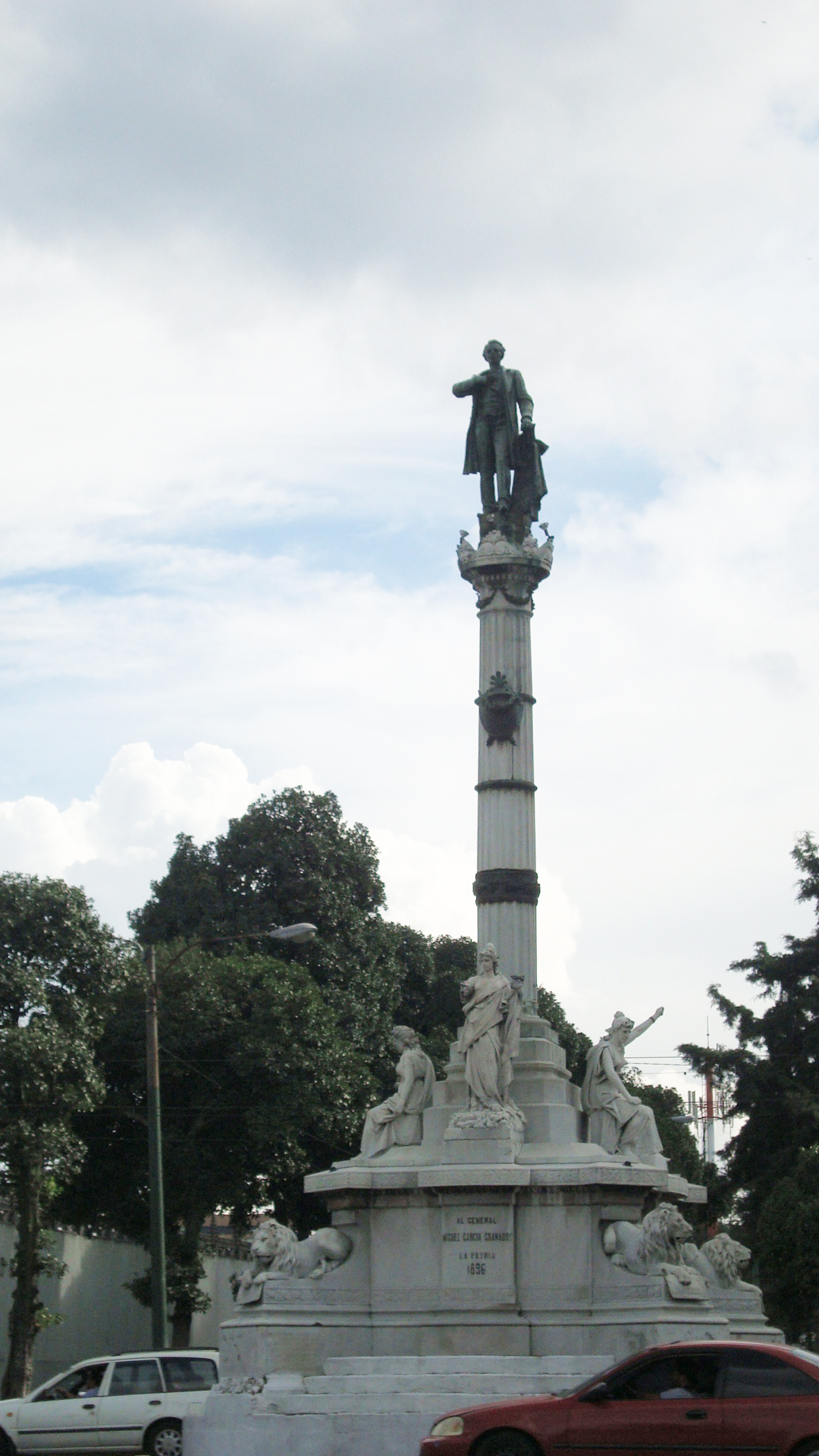
Monument to Miguel García Granados, which dates from 1896.
