= Neocyclotus =

Scientific classification
- Kingdom: Animalia
- Phylum: Mollusca
- Class: Gastropoda
- Subclass: Caenogastropoda
- Order: Architaenioglossa
- Family: Neocyclotidae
- Genus: Neocyclotus; Crosse & Fischer, 1886

Genus of land snails

Neocyclotus is a genus of gastropods belonging to the family Neocyclotidae.

The species of this genus are found in America.

Species:

- Neocyclotus agassizi (Bartsch & J.P.E.Morrison, 1942)
- Neocyclotus aulari (H.B.Baker, 1923)
- Neocyclotus bisinuatus (E.von Martens, 1864)
- Neocyclotus burringtoni (Bartsch & J.P.E.Morrison, 1942)
- Neocyclotus capscelius F.G.Thompson, 1969
- Neocyclotus carabobensis (Bartsch & J.P.E.Morrison, 1942)
- Neocyclotus cayennensis (Shuttleworth, 1852)
- Neocyclotus chrysacme (Bartsch & J.P.E.Morrison, 1942)
- Neocyclotus connivens (H.Adams, 1866)
- Neocyclotus corpulentus (E.A.Smith, 1878)
- Neocyclotus corrugatus (G.B.Sowerby I, 1843)
- Neocyclotus distinctus (G.B.Sowerby I, 1843)
- Neocyclotus duffianus (C.B.Adams, 1845)
- Neocyclotus dysoni (L.Pfeiffer, 1851)
- Neocyclotus glaucostomus (L.Pfeiffer, 1863)
- Neocyclotus granadensis (Shuttleworth, 1857)
- Neocyclotus granulatus (L.Pfeiffer, 1863)
- Neocyclotus haematomma (L.Pfeiffer, 1863)
- Neocyclotus kugleri (Bartsch & J.P.E.Morrison, 1942)
- Neocyclotus limellus (Bartsch & J.P.E.Morrison, 1942)
- Neocyclotus panamensis Da Costa, 1904
- Neocyclotus peilei Gude, 1912
- Neocyclotus prominulus (d'Orbigny, 1837)
- Neocyclotus quitensis (L.Pfeiffer, 1852)
- Neocyclotus rugatus (Guppy, 1864)
- Neocyclotus sanctamarthae (Pilsbry & Clapp, 1902)
- Neocyclotus simplicostus F.G.Thompson, 1969
- Neocyclotus smithi (Pilsbry & Clapp, 1902)
- Neocyclotus stramineus (Reeve, 1843)
- Neocyclotus vincentinus (Pilsbry, 1935)
- Neocyclotus wetmorei (Bartsch & J.P.E.Morrison, 1942)
