= Amphicyclotulus martinicensis =

Conservation status
- Vulnerable (IUCN 2.3)

Scientific classification
- Kingdom: Animalia
- Phylum: Mollusca
- Class: Gastropoda
- Subclass: Caenogastropoda
- Order: Architaenioglossa
- Family: Neocyclotidae
- Genus: Amphicyclotulus
- Species: A. martinicensis

Binomial name
- Amphicyclotulus martinicensis (Shuttleworth, 1857)

Synonyms
- Amphicyclotulus (Amphicyclotulus) liratus (Drouët, 1859) alternative representation; Amphicyclotulus liratus (Drouët, 1859) junior subjective synonym; Amphicyclotus liratus (Drouët, 1859) junior subjective synonym; Cyclophorus liratus Drouët, 1859 junior subjective synonym; Cyclostoma (Cyclotus) martinicense Shuttleworth, 1857 (basionym); Incerticyclus martinicensis (Shuttleworth, 1857) superseded combination; Neocyclotus (Neocyclotus) martinicensis (Shuttleworth, 1857) alternative representation; Neocyclotus martinicensis (Shuttleworth, 1857)

Species of gastropod

Amphicyclotulus martinicensis, common name the Martinique Cyclophora, is a species of tropical land snail with a gill and an operculum, a terrestrial gastropod mollusc in the family Neocyclotidae.

This land snail species is vulnerable to the possibility of extinction.

== Description ==
The height of the shell attains 8 mm, its diameter 14 mm.

(Original description in Latin) The shell is characterized by a broad umbilicus. The shell is depressed orbicular in form, somewhat thin, and finely striated. Its surface is densely covered with subtle, obtuse spiral grooves, rendering it pale olive and slightly shiny. The spire is subtly elevated, terminating in a somewhat obtuse apex, and the suture is moderately deep. The shell consists of 4 to 4.5 convex whorls that exhibit rapid growth, with the body whorl showing minimal ascent. The aperture is nearly circular and only slightly oblique. The peristome is continuous and straight.

The operculum is calcareous, faintly concave on its exterior surface, tightly coiled, and comprises 10 whorls with a depressed and dilated margin.

== Distribution ==
This species is endemic to the island of Martinique, West Indies.
