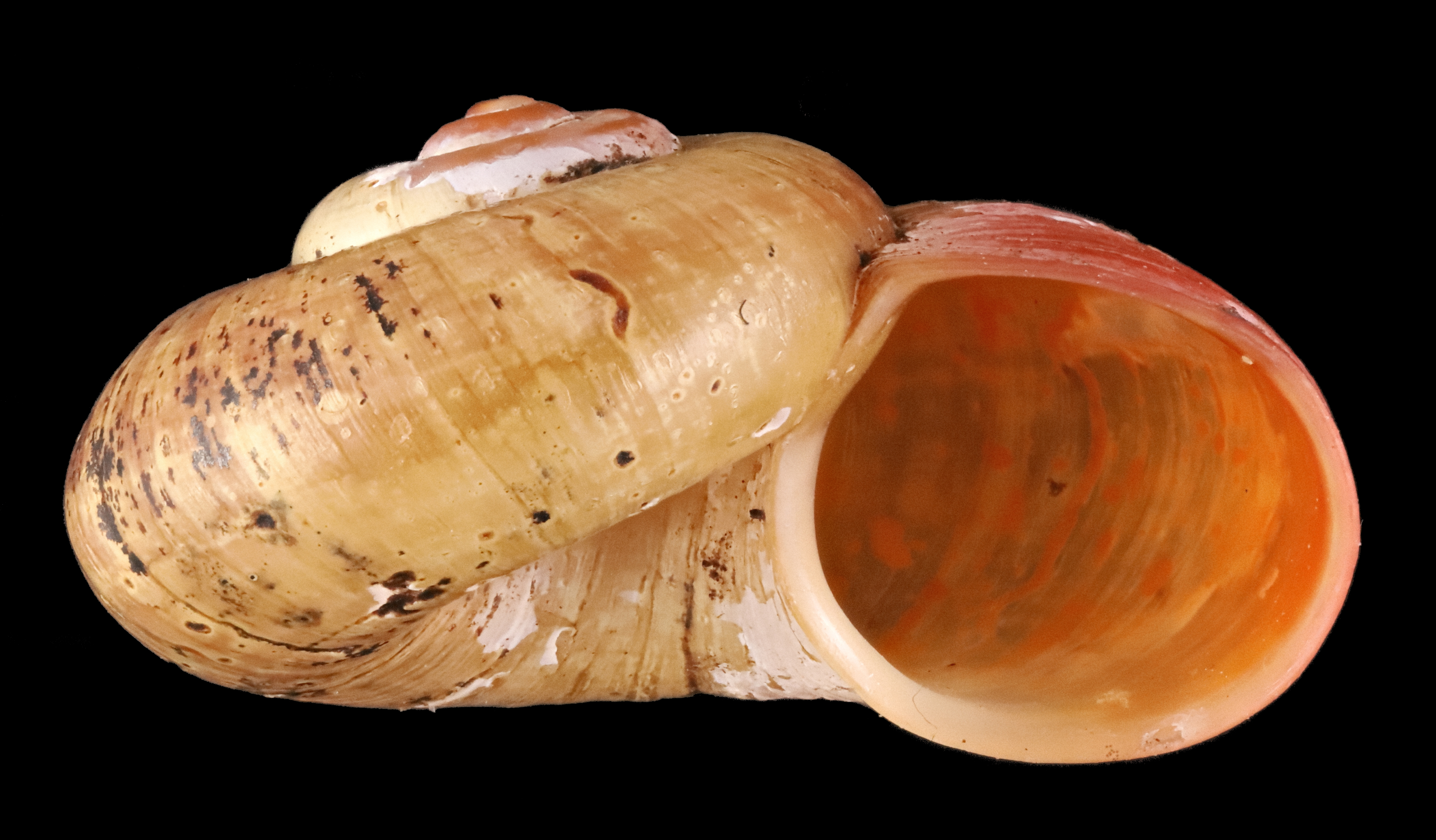
- Shell of Amphicyclotulus beauianus

Scientific classification
- Kingdom: Animalia
- Phylum: Mollusca
- Class: Gastropoda
- Subclass: Caenogastropoda
- Order: Architaenioglossa
- Family: Neocyclotidae
- Genus: Amphicyclotulus
- Species: A. beauianus

Binomial name
- Amphicyclotulus beauianus (Petit de la Saussaye, 1853)

Synonyms
- Amphicyclotulus (Cycloblandia) beauianus (Petit de la Saussaye, 1853) alternative representation; Amphicyclotus beauianus (Petit de la Saussaye, 1853) (unaccepted combination); Cyclostoma beauiana Petit de la Saussaye, 1853 superseded combination; Cyclostoma inornata Redfield, 1854 (junior synonym)

= Amphicyclotulus beauianus =

Species of gastropod

Amphicyclotulus beauianus is a species of tropical land snail with a gill and an operculum, a terrestrial gastropod mollusc in the family Neocyclotidae.

This land snail species is vulnerable to the possibility of extinction.

== Description ==
The height of the shell attains 5 mm, its diameter 10 mm.

(Original description in French) The shell, nearly orbicular in form, is thin and possesses a subtle gloss. It is enveloped by an olive-green epidermis that is nuanced with red or pink hues. The spire is short and obtuse, and the shell consists of roughly four and a half whorls that are almost entirely smooth, exhibiting only faint growth striae. The aperture is circular, with a straight and relatively thin peristome. The umbilicus is notably deep. The operculum is composed of a horny material, is multispiral, and presents a concave exterior surface.

== Distribution ==
This species is endemic to the island of Guadeloupe
