= Gran Centro Los Próceres =

Shopping complex in Guatemala City, Guatemala

Coordinates: 14.5948°N 90.5155°W

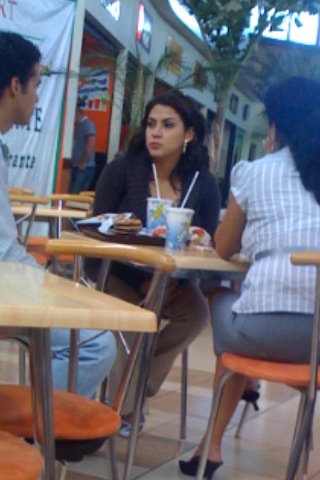
A group of friends enjoying a beverage in the catering section of the Gran Centro Los Próceres complex

The Centro Comercial Próceres, formerly known as Gran Centro Los Próceres is an extensive shopping complex in Guatemala City, Guatemala. It is run by the Los Próceres group which operates across Latin America and was opened to the public in September 1993.

Located at 6 calle 2–00 in the centre of Zone 10 of the city, at its time of inauguration it was one of the largest and most modern shopping malls in Guatemala City. The mall sells clothes, shoes, furniture and electronics and contains many restaurants with cuisine from around the globe, fast-food and ice-cream kiosks. It was also one of the important centers in the city for viewing films, with originally 5 major cinemas located in the complex. The shopping complex is pet-friendly, but also faces great competition with a vast number of shopping malls being built in Guatemala City since its inauguration.
