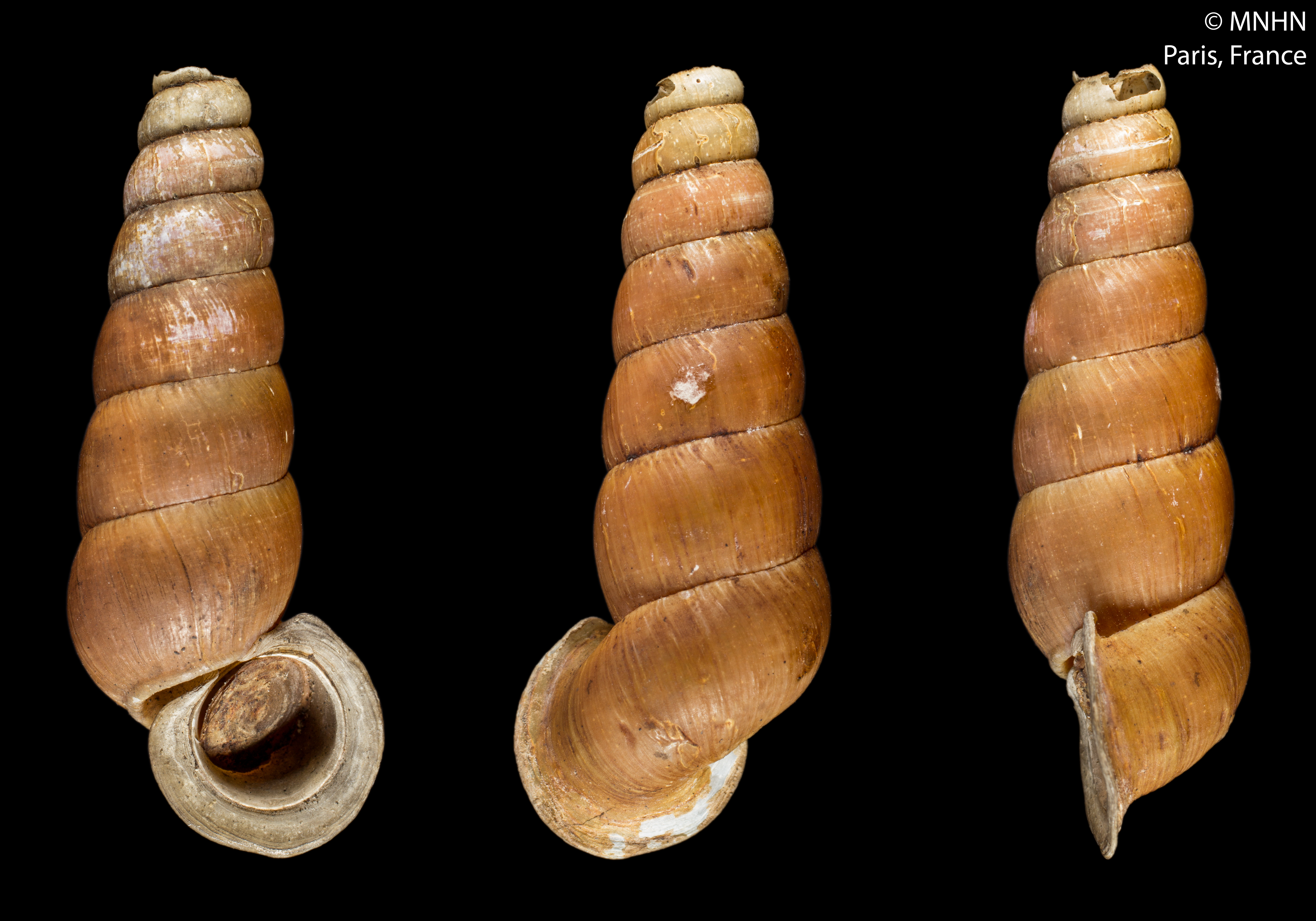
- Shell of Tomocyclus simulacrum (syntype at MNHN, Paris)

Scientific classification
- Kingdom: Animalia
- Phylum: Mollusca
- Class: Gastropoda
- Subclass: Caenogastropoda
- Order: Architaenioglossa
- Superfamily: Cyclophoroidea
- Family: Megalomastomatidae
- Genus: Tomocyclus; Crosse & P. Fischer, 1872

Synonyms
- Megalomastoma (Tomocyclus) Crosse & P. Fischer, 1872

= Tomocyclus =

Genus of gastropods

Tomocyclus is a genus of land snails, terrestrial gastropod mollusks in the subfamily Megalomastomatinae of the family Megalomastomatidae.

== Description ==
(Original description in Latin) The shell is perforated, turreted, and truncated. The aperture is subcircular and small. The peristome is double-layered: the inner layer is briefly projected inward, while the outer layer is broadly expanded, resembling a leaf. The upper margin of the outer lip is interrupted, with a unique, incised, and hollowed-out appearance.

The operculum is circular, corneous but relatively thick, and spirally wound. It is slightly flattened anteriorly and reinforced posteriorly by a blunt, rounded process. The margins of the operculum exhibit a somewhat lamellar structure.

== Species ==
- Tomocyclus fistulosus F. G. Thompson, 1963
- Tomocyclus gealei Crosse & P. Fischer, 1872
- Tomocyclus guatemalensis (L. Pfeiffer, 1851)
- Tomocyclus lunai Bartsch, 1945
- Tomocyclus simulacrum (Morelet, 1849)

Synonyms

- Tomocyclus constrictus Bartsch & J. P. E. Morrison, 1942: synonym of Tomocyclus simulacrum (Morelet, 1849) (junior synonym)
- Tomocyclus copanensis (G. B. Sowerby I, 1850): synonym of Tomocyclus simulacrum (Morelet, 1849) (junior synonym)
- Tomocyclus siphonis Bartsch & J. P. E. Morrison, 1942: synonym of Tomocyclus simulacrum (Morelet, 1849) (junior synonym)
