= Farcimen =

Scientific classification
- Kingdom: Animalia
- Phylum: Mollusca
- Class: Gastropoda
- Subclass: Caenogastropoda
- Order: Architaenioglossa
- Family: Megalomastomatidae
- Genus: Farcimen; Troschel, 1847

Genus of gastropods

Farcimen is a genus of land snails with an operculum, terrestrial gastropod mollusks in the family Megalomastomatidae.

== Species ==
Species within the genus Farcimen include:

- Farcimen alutaceum (Menke in Pfeiffer, 1846)
- Farcimen arangoi Torre & Bartsch, 1942
- Farcimen auriculatum (d’Orbigny, 1842)
- Farcimen bartschi Alcalde, 1945
- Farcimen bilabiatum Alcalde, 1945
- Farcimen bituberculatum (Sowerby, 1850)
- Farcimen camagueyanum Torre & Bartsch, 1942
- Farcimen cisnerosi Alcalde, 1945
- Farcimen guanense Torre & Bartsch, 1942
- Farcimen guitarti Torre & Bartsch, 1942
- Farcimen gundlachi (Pfeiffer, 1856)
- Farcimen hendersoni Torre & Bartsch, 1942
- Farcimen imperator Alcalde, 1945
- Farcimen jaumei Alcalde, 1945
- Farcimen leoninum (Pfeiffer, 1856)
- Farcimen magister Torre & Bartsch, 1942
- Farcimen majusculum Alcalde, 1945
- Farcimen mani (Poey, 1851)
- Farcimen najazaense Torre & Bartsch, 1942
- Farcimen obesum Torre & Bartsch, 1942
- Farcimen procer (Poey, 1854)
- Farcimen pseudotortum Torre & Bartsch, 1942
- Farcimen rocai Torre & Bartsch, 1942
- Farcimen seminudum (Poey, 1854)
- Farcimen subventricosum Torre & Bartsch, 1942
- Farcimen superbum Torre & Bartsch, 1942
- Farcimen torrei (Guitart, 1936)
- Farcimen tortum (Wood, 1828)
- Farcimen ungula (Poey, 1856)
- Farcimen ventricosum (d’Orbigny, 1842)
- Farcimen vignalense Torre & Bartsch, 1942
- Farcimen wrighti Torre & Bartsch, 1942
- Farcimen yunquense Torre & Bartsch, 1942
