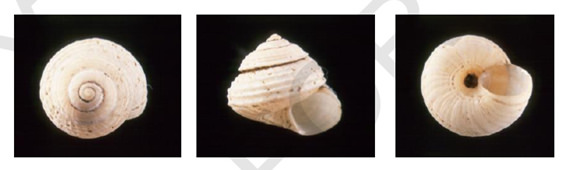
- Ostodes strigatus shells

Scientific classification
- Kingdom: Animalia
- Phylum: Mollusca
- Class: Gastropoda
- Subclass: Caenogastropoda
- Order: Architaenioglossa
- Superfamily: Cyclophoroidea
- Family: Neocyclotidae
- Genus: Ostodes; Gould, 1862

= Ostodes (gastropod) =

Genus of gastropods

Ostodes is a genus of tropical land snails with gills and an operculum, terrestrial gastropod mollusks in the family Neocyclotidae (according to the taxonomy of the Gastropoda by Bouchet & Rocroi, 2005).

== Species ==
Species within the genus Ostodes include:

- Ostodes adjunctus
- Ostodes brazieri
- Ostodes exasperatus Girardi, 1978
- Ostodes garretti Clench, 1949
- Ostodes plicatus
- Ostodes strigatus
- Ostodes upolensis (Moulson, 1865)
