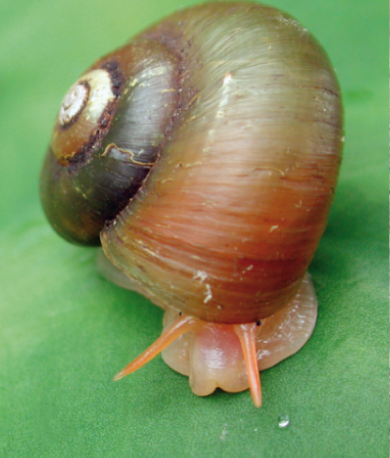

Scientific classification
- Kingdom: Animalia
- Phylum: Mollusca
- Class: Gastropoda
- Subclass: Caenogastropoda
- Order: Architaenioglossa
- Superfamily: Cyclophoroidea
- Family: Neocyclotidae
- Genus: Amphicyclotulus
- Species: A. amethystinus

Binomial name
- Amphicyclotulus amethystinus (Guppy, 1868)

Synonyms
- Cyclotus amethystinus var. α Guppy, 1868 (in part); Cyclotus amethystinus var. β Guppy, 1868; Cyclophorus schrammi (Shuttleworth); Amphicyclotulus mineri Bartsch, 1942; Amphicyclotulus (Amphicyclotulus) mineri Bartsch in Torre, Bartsch & Morrison, 1942; Cyclophorus amethystinus; Amphicyclotulus (Cycloblandia) amethystinus

= Amphicyclotulus amethystinus =

Species of gastropod

Amphicyclotulus amethystinus is a species of tropical land snail with a gill and an operculum, a terrestrial gastropod mollusc in the family Neocyclotidae.

== Shell description ==
The shell is smooth, shining, not striate spirally, generally somewhat more depressed, deep chestnut or reddish brown. Whorls are a little flattened near the suture. The species may have subtle spiral striation, although there exists considerable variation; axial growth lines are clearly visible.

The operculum is horny, diaphanous, concave externally, cartilaginous within, the nucleus projecting internally; with from ten to fourteen very narrow whorls, their rather lamellar outer edges slightly free.

Amphicyclotulus amethystinus has spiral threads absent or only weakly present. There are found only two species in the genus Amphicyclotulus in Dominica. The other species is Amphicyclotulus dominicensis and it has spiral cords clearly present and raised.

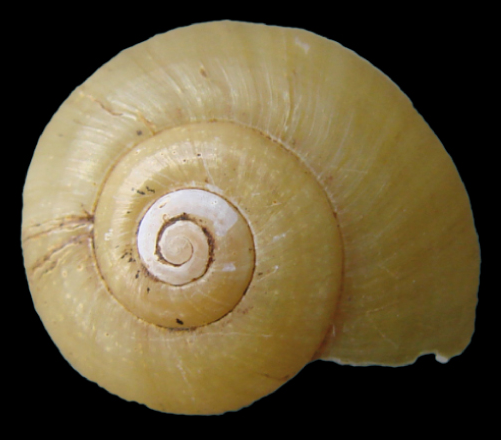
Apical view of the shell. Width of the shell is 14.1 mm.

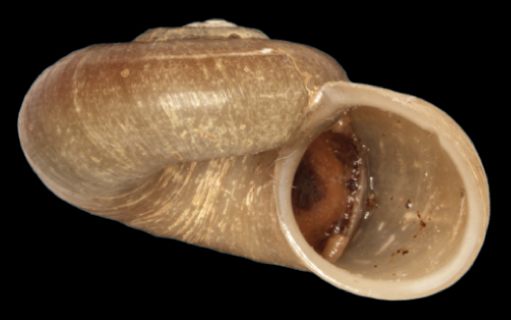
Apical view of the shell. Width of the shell is 18.4 mm.

Robert John Lechmere Guppy (1868) noted that this species is not found above 1000 m. Although he recognized two "forms", he did not recognize two separate species. George French Angas (1884) subsequently recorded "Cyclophorus amethystinus" from altitudes above 1200 m. Paul Bartsch (1942) restricted the name amesthystinus to Guppy’s var. β, the "smooth, shining, not striate spirally" form.

== Distribution ==
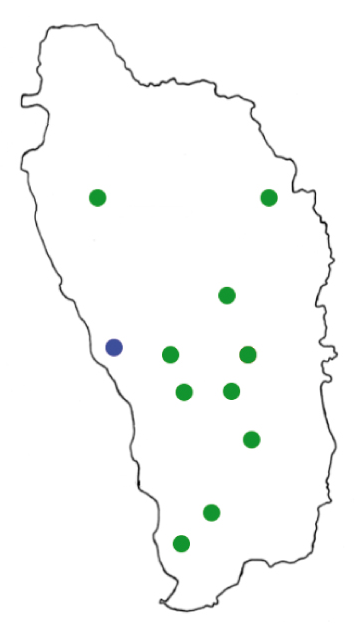
Distribution of Amphicyclotulus amethystinus (green dots) and Amphicyclotulus dominicensis (one blue dot) in Dominica.

This species is endemic to in Dominica.

The type locality is Laudat, Dominica. The holotype is in National Museum of Natural History under number 535856.

All known localities of Amphicyclotulus amethystinus include:

- Saint Andrew Parish, Dominica: west of Calibishie, Hampstead Estate
- Saint Andrew Parish, Dominica: Carib Territory
- Saint Andrew Parish, Dominica: Marigot, Captain Bruce
- Saint Andrew Parish, Dominica: 1 km northwest of Thibaud
- Saint David Parish, Dominica: Emerald Pool
- Saint David Parish, Dominica: 1.5 km north of Petit Savane
- 0.5 km south of Rosalie River bridge
- Saint George Parish, Dominica: Bellevue Chopin
- Saint George Parish, Dominica: Freshwater Lake area
- Saint George Parish, Dominica: trail to Lake Boeri
- Saint Joseph Parish, Dominica: d’Leau Grommier
- Saint Joseph Parish, Dominica: road to Fond Cassé, Mary Martin Farm
- Saint Joseph Parish, Dominica: path Mero-Salisbury
- Saint Luke Parish, Dominica: Pointe Michel
- Saint Paul Parish, Dominica: Sylvania
- Saint Peter Parish, Dominica: Syndicate.
