= Obelisco (Guatemala City) =

Coordinates: 14.5941°N 90.5178°W

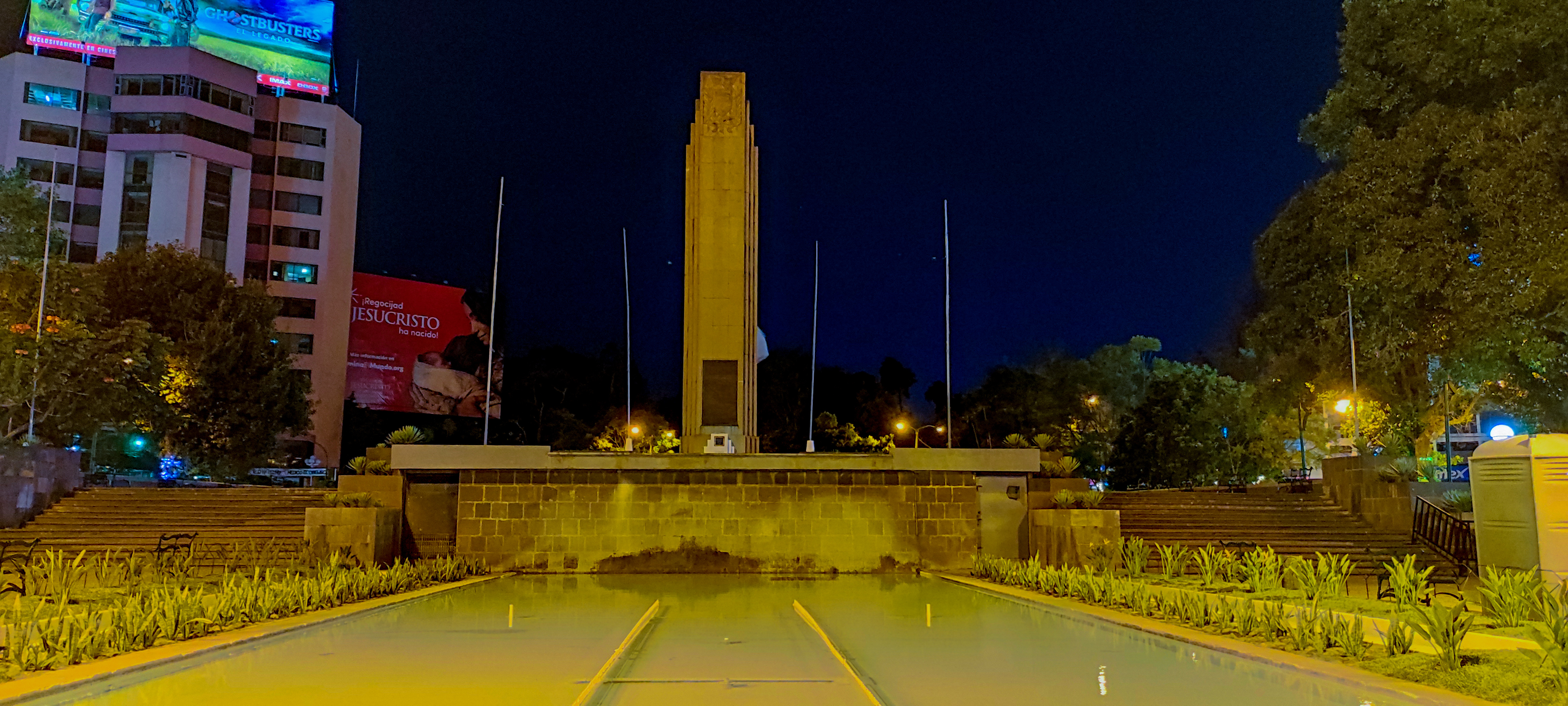
El Obelisco.

El Obelisco (The Obelisk) or Monumento a los Próceres de la Independencia (Monument to the Heroes of Independence) is a monument in Guatemala City, Guatemala built in 1935 under the government of Jorge Ubico and designed by Rafael Pérez De León. It commemorates the independence of Central America. The 18-metre high, 221-ton stone structure is situated on a huge roundabout called Plaza del Obelisco (Obelisk Square), where the Avenida Reforma, Boulevard Los Próceres, Avenida Las Americas and Boulevard Liberacion meet. The neoclassic Palacio de La Reforma once stood at this place, until it was destroyed by the earthquakes of 1917/1918. In 1950, under president Juan José Arévalo, a flame of liberty was installed by the column.
