= Paseo Los Próceres =

Monument in Caracas, Venezuela

Coordinates: 10°27′50″N 66°54′12″W

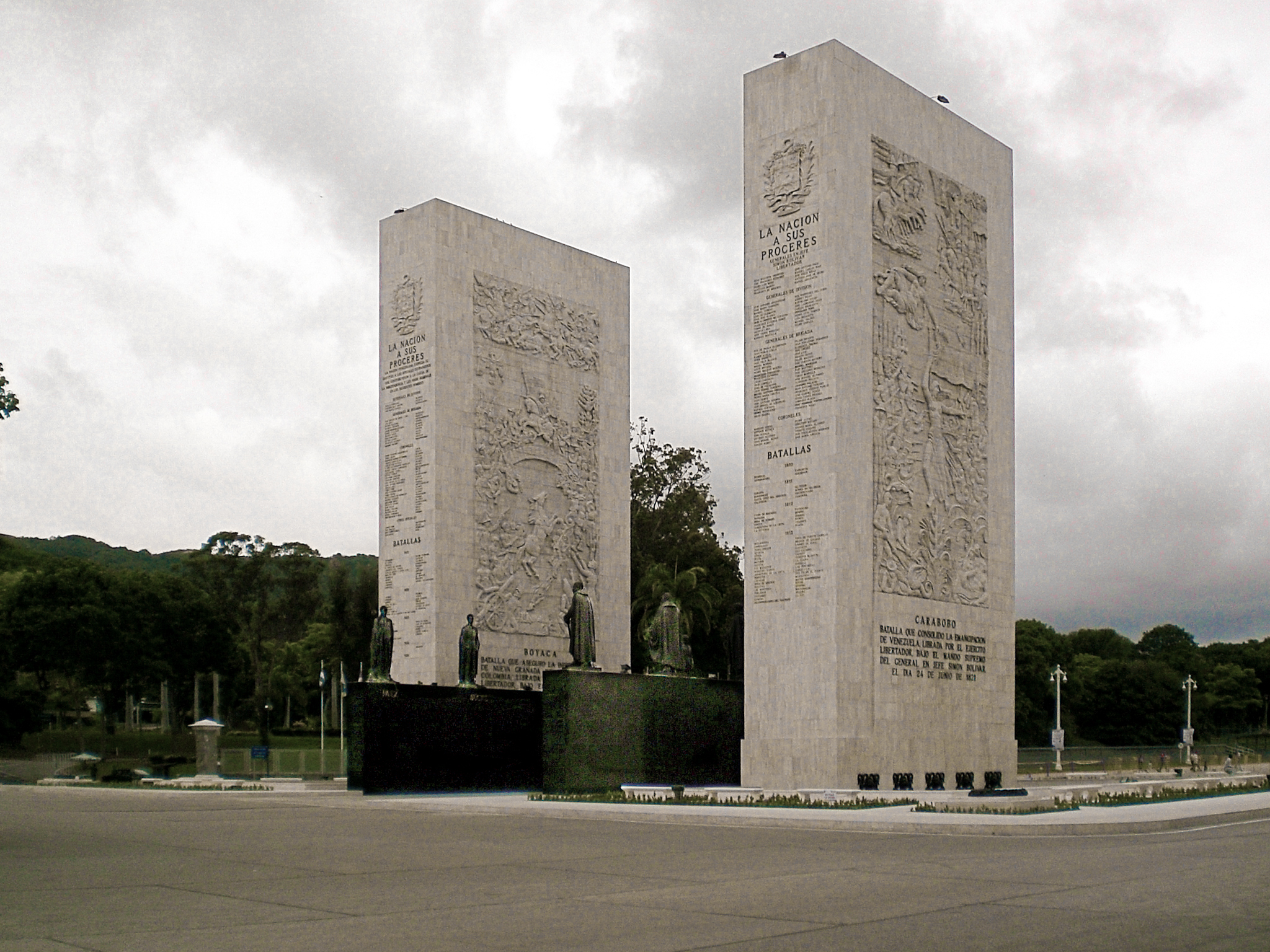
Monument to the heroes

The Paseo Los Próceres (translatable into English as Walkway of the Heroes) is a monument located in the Venezuelan city of Caracas, near Fort Tiuna and the Military Academy of the Bolivarian Army. On the promenade there are statues of the heroes of the War of Independence, as well as fountains, stairs, squares, roads and walls. Since 1993, the Paseo Los Próceres and the entire annex system was declared a National Historic Landmark.

== History ==
It was inaugurated in 1956 by President Marcos Pérez Jiménez, calling it El Sistema de Nacionalidad (The System of Nationality) in honor of the independence struggles of Colombia, Bolivia, Ecuador, Peru and Venezuela. It was created to represent the Venezuelan military institution on an urban scale, it is part of the System of Nationality which is made up of several elements linked by a large road and pedestrian axis that articulates the ceremonial complex structured by the great Courtyard of Honor as a highlight and receiver of the urban axis that begins in the University City of Caracas.

== Structure ==
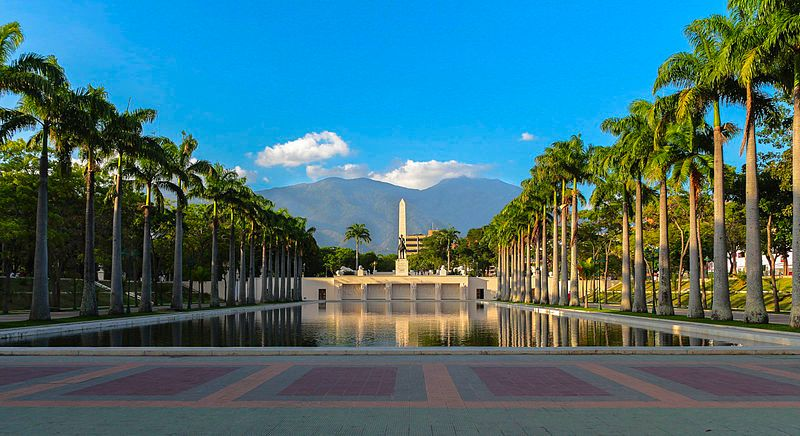
Paseo Los Próceres

The monument is defined by two rows of lighting poles as virtual walls. Located on the perimeter of Fort Tiuna, the largest national military complex, it articulates with the Bolivarian Military University of Venezuela, the parade courtyard, the monoliths of heroes, an oval of fountains, gardens and baroque ornaments. Glasses, cups and other pieces that commemorate the Greek Hellenistic period as the statue of the god of the waters, Poseidon, complement the architectural complex. Deployed along a two-kilometer avenue, it has driveways and grandstands on the sides, while fountains, gardens, four monoliths and huge statues in honor of the independence heroes extend in the center. It's the stage of great military parades and other official activities of the federal government.

The Monument to the Heroes is formed by four parallelepipeds: two vertical ones made of travertine marble and two horizontal ones in black marble, each with 30 meters/98 ft in length and a total weight of 300 tons/672.000 lb. On the horizontal walls there are bronze statues representing the heroes of independence: Simón Bolívar, Antonio José de Sucre, Rafael Urdaneta, Santiago Mariño, Francisco de Miranda, José Antonio Páez, Manuel Piar, José Félix Ribas, Luis Brión, Juan Bautista Arismendi and José Francisco Bermúdez. In the monoliths the names of the Venezuelan heroes and the four battles that sealed the independence of the Bolivarian countries were carved: Ayacucho, Boyacá, Carabobo and Pichincha, also represented in high relief. The Paseo de los Próceres, part of these emblematic blocks, is a wide avenue whose side stands are stands for military parades and official events of state as well as a grandstand, all renovated in the 2010s.

The monument is part of the System of the Nationality whose original function was to connect the Central University of Venezuela with the campus of the Military University. It was designed in the neoclassical style by Malaussena, presided over by the monument dedicated to national heroes, intended to occupy, in the urban geography of Caracas, the place of the Champs-Élysées in Paris.

The Paseo Los ilustres (Boulevard of the Illustrious) is a large vehicular avenue with driveways and a pedestrian island in the middle, erected as a tribute to the illustrious children of the nation, is the point of exchange of civil and military population, in which is located the Armed Forces Club, the headquarters for social events of members of the military institution. On the other hand, the Paseo de los Símbolos (Boulevard of the Symbols) is defined by a sculptural set made in bronze, on a marble pedestal and a water mirror. A sculptural work made by Ernesto Maragall in 1957, it constitutes an allegory to the Venezuelan national symbols: the coat of arms, the flag and the national anthem. On the Paseo Los Precursores (Boulevard of the Precursors) there's a sculpture of a Native Venezuelan who stands on his horse, made of bronze, in the middle of a platform and marble base guarded by two lions, also by Maragall, honoring the country's indigenous population. A commemorative obelisk, mosaic paths, as well as the symmetrical design of the complex, offer the place a face of serenity, while bas-reliefs made in 1957 by sculptor Hugo Daini can be seen on one of the walls of the column.

Scattered among the succession of fountains, squares and paths that go from the Monument of the Precursors to that of the Próceres are other sculptural pieces in the form of nymph figures, executed in artificial stone. On the boulevard visitors can see the murals that tell the history of Venezuela from pre-Spanish times.
