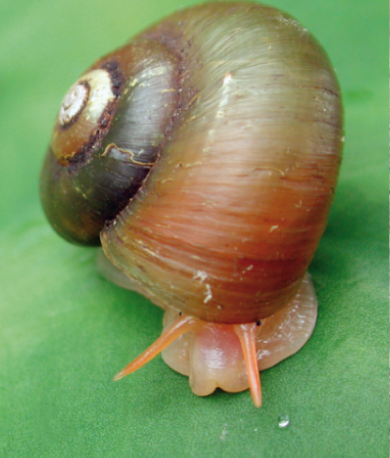
- A live individual of Amphicyclotulus amethystinus
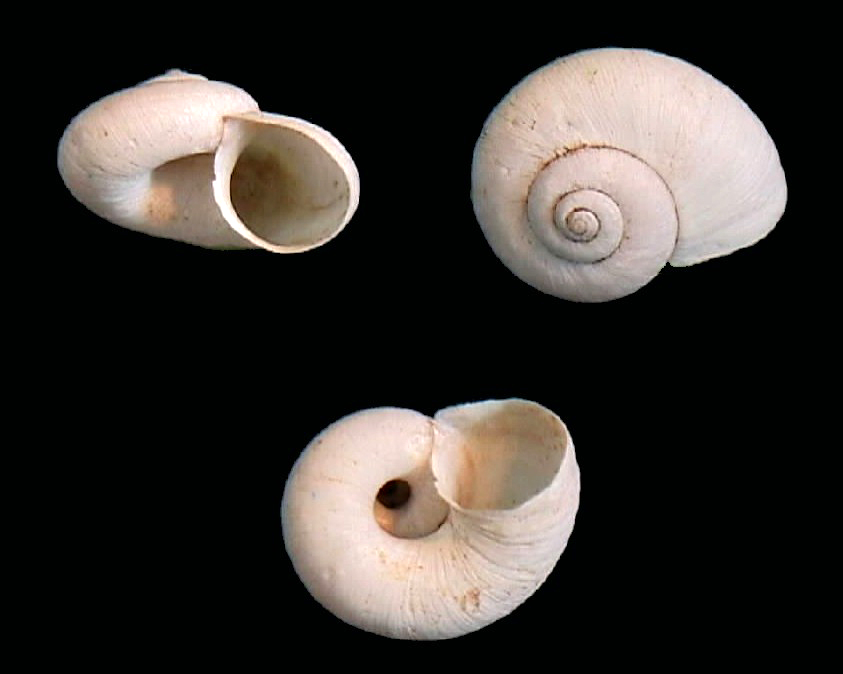
- Three views of a shell of Poteria fasciatum

Scientific classification
- Kingdom: Animalia
- Phylum: Mollusca
- Class: Gastropoda
- Subclass: Caenogastropoda
- Order: Architaenioglossa
- Superfamily: Cyclophoroidea
- Family: Neocyclotidae; Kobelt & Möllendorff, 1897

Synonyms
- Dicristidae Golikov & Starobogatov, 1975

= Neocyclotidae =

Family of gastropods

Neocyclotidae is a family of tropical land snails with gills and an operculum, terrestrial gastropod mollusks in the order Architaenioglossa.

== Taxonomy ==
The World Register of Marine Species accepts the following subfamilies and genera within Neocyclotidae:

- Amphicyclotinae Kobelt & Möllendorff, 1897
  - Amphicyclotulus Kobelt, 1912
  - Amphicyclotus Crosse & P. Fischer, 1879
  - Barbacyclus Bartsch & J. P. E. Morrison, 1942
  - Calacyclotus Bartsch & J. P. E. Morrison, 1942
  - Cyclohaitia Bartsch, 1942
  - Cyclopedus Gargominy & Muratov, 2012
  - Filocyclus Bartsch & J. P. E. Morrison, 1942
  - Lagocyclus Bartsch & J. P. E. Morrison, 1942
  - Liracyclotus Bartsch & J. P. E. Morrison, 1942
  - Ostodes A. Gould, 1862
- Neocyclotinae Kobelt & Möllendorff, 1897
  - Calaperostoma Pilsbry, 1935
  - Crocidopoma Shuttleworth, 1856
  - Cyclobakeria Bartsch, 1942
  - Cyclocubana C. de la Torre & Bartsch, 1942
  - Dicrista F. G. Thompson, 1969
  - Fijiopoma Clench, 1949
  - Gassiesia Clench, 1949
  - Gonatorhaphe Möllendorff, 1898
  - Incidostoma Bartsch & J. P. E. Morrison, 1942
  - Kondorhaphe Clench, 1949
  - Lithacaspis F. G. Thompson, 1967
  - Mexcyclotus Bartsch & J. P. E. Morrison, 1942
  - Neocyclotus Crosse & P. Fischer, 1886
  - Paramiella Clench, 1954
  - Poteria J. E. Gray, 1850
  - Xenocyclus F. G. Thompson, 1969
- Genera not placed in a subfamiliy
  - Cycladamsia Bartsch, 1942
  - Cyclochittya J. P. E. Morrison, 1955
  - Cyclojamaicia Bartsch, 1942
  - Cyclopilsbrya Bartsch, 1942
  - Cyclovendreysia Bartsch, 1942
  - Daronia A. Adams, 1861
  - Incerticyclus J. P. E. Morrison, 1955
