= List of non-marine molluscs of Puerto Rico =

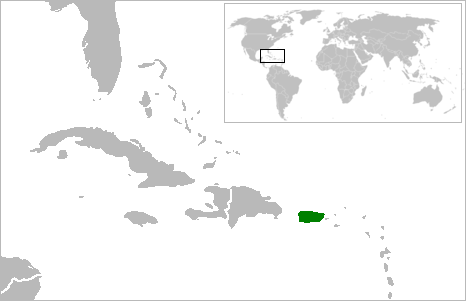
Location of Puerto Rico

The non-marine mollusks of Puerto Rico are a part of the molluscan fauna of Puerto Rico. A number of species of non-marine mollusks are found in the wild in Puerto Rico.

Robert James Shuttleworth has described 3 genera and 25 species from Puerto Rico as new in 1854.

== Freshwater gastropods ==
Thiaridae

- Tarebia granifera (Lamarck, 1822)

== Land gastropods ==
Amphibulimidae

- genus Gaeotis Shuttleworth, 1854 is endemic to Puerto Rico
  - Gaeotis albopunctulata
  - Gaeotis nigrolineata
  - Gaeotis flavolineata
  - Gaeotis malleata

Ellobiidae

- Melampus bidentatus Say, 1822
- Melampus coffea (Linnaeus, 1758)
- Melampus floridanus Pfeiffer, 1856
- Melampus monile (Bruguiére, 1789)

Sagdidae

- Polydontes acutangula Burrow, 1815

Succineidae

- Succinea approximans Shuttleworth, 1854

Veronicellidae

- Diplosolenodes occidentalis (Guilding, 1851)
- Leidyula floridana (Leidy, 1851)
- Sarasinula plebeia (Fischer, 1868)
- Veronicella cubensis (Pfeiffer, 1840)
- Veronicella portoricensis (Semper, 1885)
- Veronicella tenax (Baker, 1931)

== See also ==
Lists of molluscs of surrounding countries:

- List of non-marine molluscs of the United States
