= Potamojanuarius lamellatus =

Scientific classification
- Kingdom: Animalia
- Phylum: Mollusca
- Class: Gastropoda
- Order: Systellommatophora
- Family: Veronicellidae
- Genus: Potamojanuarius
- Species: P. lamellatus

Binomial name
- Potamojanuarius lamellatus (Semper, 1885)

Species of gastropod

Potamojanuarius lamellatus is a species of air-breathing land slug, a terrestrial pulmonate gastropod mollusk in the family Veronicellidae, the leatherleaf slugs.

The holotype is kept in Zoological Museum of Kiel University (Zoologisches Museums der Christian-Albrechts-Universität zu Kiel) in Kiel, Germany (lot Mo-1392).

== Distribution ==
The distribution of Potamojanuarius lamellatus includes Brazil.

== Ecology ==
Potamojanuarius lamellatus was found to represent 50% of the prey of the snail-eating snake Sibynomorphus neuwiedi.
