= Veronicella portoricensis =

Scientific classification
- Domain: Eukaryota
- Kingdom: Animalia
- Phylum: Mollusca
- Class: Gastropoda
- Order: Systellommatophora
- Family: Veronicellidae
- Genus: Veronicella
- Species: V. portoricensis

Binomial name
- Veronicella portoricensis (Semper, 1885)

Synonyms
- Vaginula portoricensis Semper, 1886; Vaginulus portoricenis Semper, 1886; Belocaulus portoricensis ?Vaginilus kraussii Veronicella (Leidyula) krausii

Species of gastropod

Veronicella portoricensis is a species of air-breathing land slug, a terrestrial pulmonate gastropod mollusc in the family Veronicellidae, the leatherleaf slugs.

== Distribution ==
This species occurs in:

- The highland rainforests of Puerto Rico
