= Vaginulus sloanii =

Scientific classification
- Kingdom: Animalia
- Phylum: Mollusca
- Class: Gastropoda
- Order: Systellommatophora
- Family: Veronicellidae
- Genus: Vaginulus
- Species: V. sloanii

Binomial name
- Vaginulus sloanii (Cuvier, 1817)

Synonyms
- Onchidium sloanii Cuvier, 1817

Species of gastropod

Vaginulus sloanii is a species of air-breathing sea slug, a shell-less marine pulmonate gastropod mollusk in the family Veronicellidae.
