= Vaginulus =

Scientific classification
- Kingdom: Animalia
- Phylum: Mollusca
- Class: Gastropoda
- Order: Systellommatophora
- Family: Veronicellidae
- Genus: Vaginulus; Férussac, 1829

Genus of gastropods

Vaginulus is a genus of air-breathing land slugs, shell-less terrestrial pulmonate gastropod mollusks in the family Veronicellidae, the leatherleaf slugs.

== Species ==
Species in the genus Vaginulus include:

- Vaginulus buergueri (Simroth, 1914)
- Vaginulus rodericensis Smith, 1876
- Vaginulus sloanii (Cuvier, 1817)
- Vaginulus taunaisii (Férussac, 1821)

Synonyms:

- Vaginulus occidentalis (Guilding, 1825) is a synonym of Diplosolenodes occidentalis
- Vaginulus sinensis Heude, 1882 is a synonym of Rathouisia leonina Heude, 1882
- Vaginulus stuxbergi Westerlund, 1883 is a synonym of Oncis stuxbergi (Westerlund, 1883)
