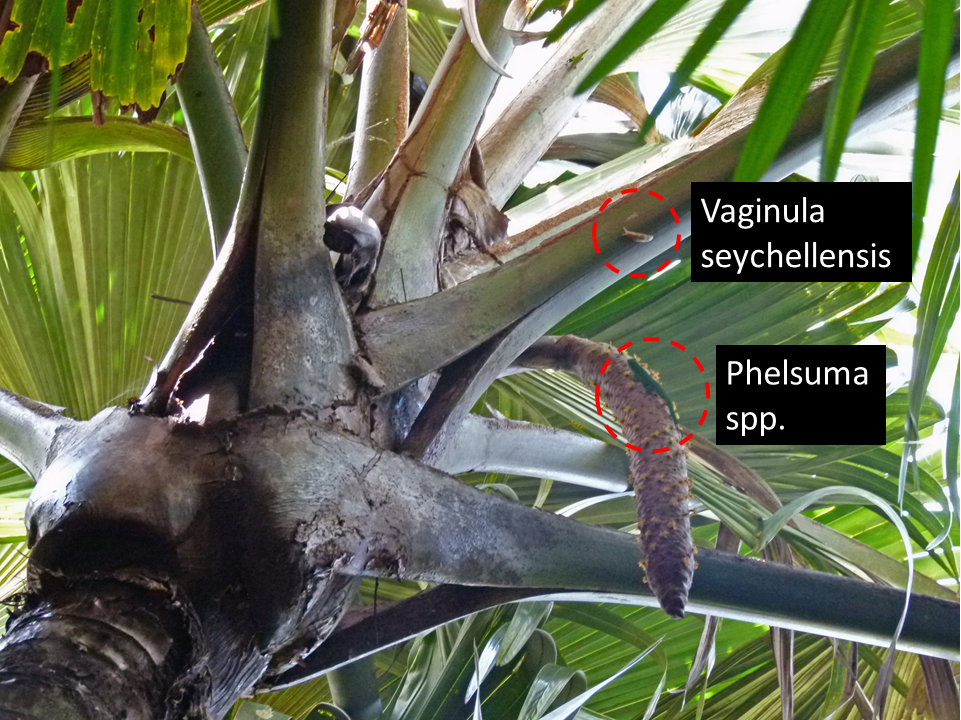
- Vaginula seychellensis slug on a coco de mer tree

Scientific classification
- Kingdom: Animalia
- Phylum: Mollusca
- Class: Gastropoda
- Order: Systellommatophora
- Family: Veronicellidae
- Genus: Vaginula

= Vaginula =

Genus of gastropods

Vaginula is a genus of air-breathing land slugs, terrestrial pulmonate gastropod mollusks in the family Veronicellidae, the leatherleaf slugs.

== Distribution ==
These land slugs occur in:

- Cuba
- Seychelles (e.g. in Vallée De Mai on Lodoicea)

== Species ==
Species within the genus Vaginula include:

- Vaginula cubensis
- Vaginula maculata
- Vaginula occidentalis
- Vaginula rodericensis
- Vaginula variegatula
- Vaginula seychellensis
