= Colosius =

Scientific classification
- Kingdom: Animalia
- Phylum: Mollusca
- Class: Gastropoda
- Order: Systellommatophora
- Family: Veronicellidae
- Genus: Colosius; Thomé, 1975

Diversity
- 5 species (in this list)

Genus of gastropods

Colosius is a genus of air-breathing land slugs, terrestrial pulmonate gastropod mollusks in the family Veronicellidae, the leatherleaf slugs.

The generic name Colosius is in honor of the Italian zoologist Giuseppe Colosi, who described a few species belonging to this genus in 1921. Thomé established the genus Colosius for five species in 1975. Gomes et al. synonymized Colosius propinquus with Colosius pulcher and discovered another new Colosius species in 2012.

== Distribution ==
The distribution of the genus Colosius includes Colombia, Ecuador, Peru, Puerto Rico, Dominican Republic and Haiti.

== Species ==
Species within the genus Colosius include:

- Colosius buergeri (Simroth, 1914)
- Colosius festae (Colosi, 1921)
- Colosius lugubris (Colosi, 1921) - type species
- Colosius pulcher (Colosi, 1921) - synonym: Colosius propinquus (Colosi, 1921)
- Colosius n. sp. from Colombia and Ecuador - a pest on coffee and on flowers
