= Vaginulus buergueri =

Scientific classification
- Kingdom: Animalia
- Phylum: Mollusca
- Class: Gastropoda
- Order: Systellommatophora
- Family: Veronicellidae
- Genus: Vaginulus
- Species: V. buergueri

Binomial name
- Vaginulus buergueri (Simroth, 1914)

Synonyms
- Vaginulus (Angustipes) buergueri

Species of gastropod

Vaginulus buergueri is a species of land slug, a terrestrial pulmonate gastropod mollusk in the family Veronicellidae, the leatherleaf slugs.

== Distribution ==
This species occurs in:

- The island of Dominica.
