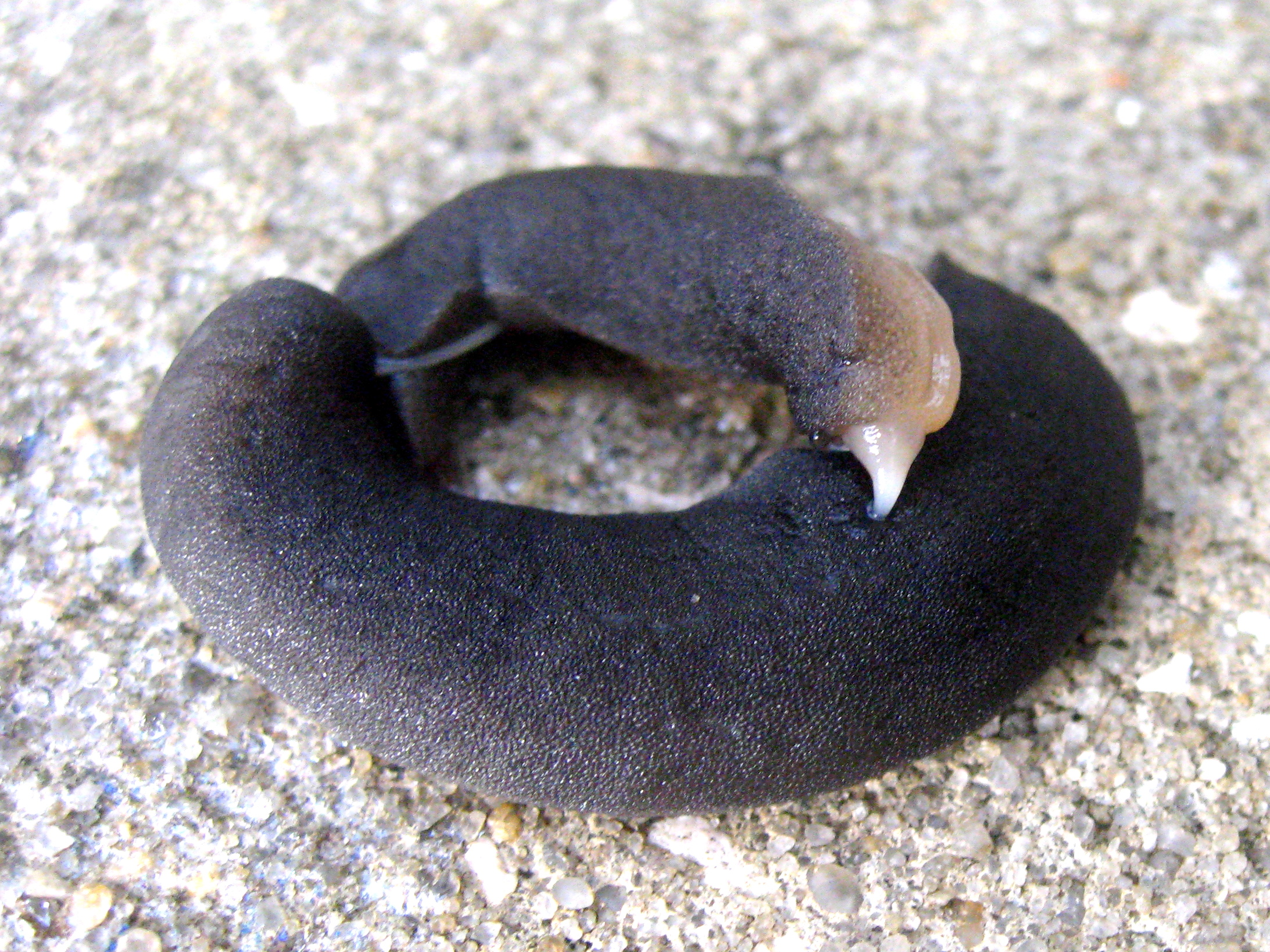
- Two Black-velvet leatherleaf slugs mating

Scientific classification
- Kingdom: Animalia
- Phylum: Mollusca
- Class: Gastropoda
- Order: Systellommatophora
- Family: Veronicellidae
- Genus: Belocaulus
- Species: B. angustipes

Binomial name
- Belocaulus angustipes (Heynemann, 1885)

= Belocaulus angustipes =

Species of gastropod

Belocaulus angustipes, the black-velvet leatherleaf slug, is a species of land slug in the family Veronicellidae native to South American tropical regions.

== Anatomy and morphology ==
As the common name suggests, Belocaulus angustipes are generally black and velvety in appearance as adults. Some juveniles of the species will have a pale strip in the middle.

== Distribution and habitat ==
Belocaulus angustipes are native to South American tropical regions. They are also a nonnative but established species in northern Florida and other states in the Gulf Coast of United States.

== Behavior ==
Belocaulus angustipes are mostly active at night and in wet weather. Their diet consists of both live and decaying plant matter. Due to their large numbers in the tropical regions, the Belocaulus angustipes are a big problem for agricultural crops.

== Parasitism ==
In South America, Belocaulus angustipes are a part of the parasitic lifecycle of the nematode parasite Angiostrongylus costaricensis.
