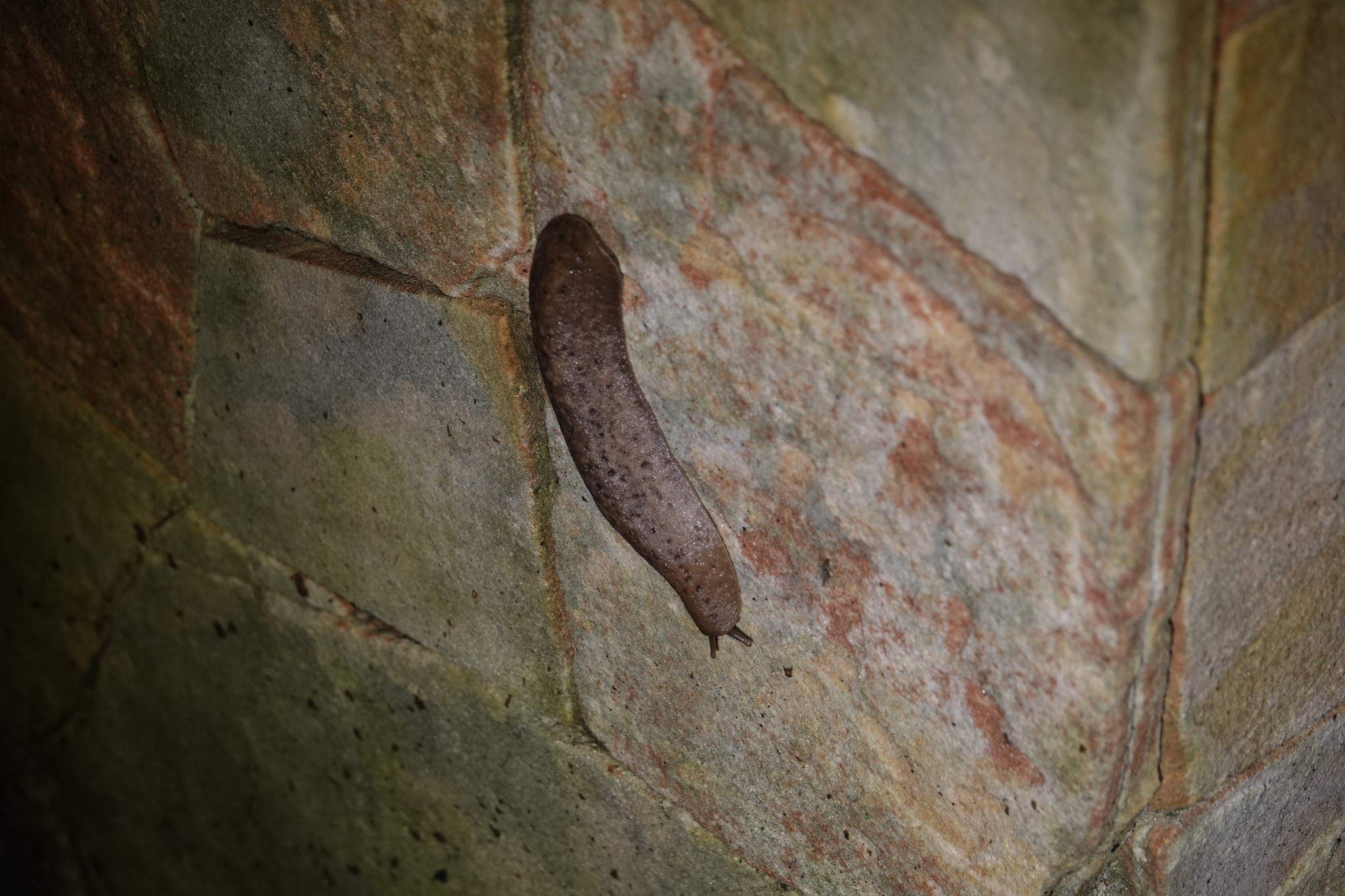

Scientific classification
- Kingdom: Animalia
- Phylum: Mollusca
- Class: Gastropoda
- Order: Systellommatophora
- Family: Veronicellidae
- Genus: Phyllocaulis
- Species: P. variegatus

Binomial name
- Phyllocaulis variegatus (Semper, 1885)

= Phyllocaulis variegatus =

Species of gastropod

Phyllocaulis variegatus is a species of land slug, a terrestrial pulmonate gastropod mollusk in the family Veronicellidae.

== Distribution ==
The distribution of Phyllocaulis variegatus includes Brazil, Argentina, and Uruguay.

== Parasites ==
This species is an intermediate host to Brachylaima species.
