= Leidyula moreleti =

Conservation status
- Secure (NatureServe)

Scientific classification
- Kingdom: Animalia
- Phylum: Mollusca
- Class: Gastropoda
- Order: Systellommatophora
- Family: Veronicellidae
- Genus: Leidyula
- Species: L. moreleti

Binomial name
- Leidyula moreleti (Fischer, 1871)

Species of gastropod

Leidyula moreleti is a species of air-breathing land slug, shell-less terrestrial pulmonate gastropod mollusk in the family Veronicellidae.

== Distribution ==
Distribution of Leidyula moreleti include:

- Mexico

This species has not yet become established in the USA, but it is considered to represent a potentially serious threat as a pest, an invasive species which could negatively affect agriculture, natural ecosystems, human health or commerce. Therefore it has been suggested that this species be given top national quarantine significance in the USA.
