= Sarasinula dubia =

Scientific classification
- Kingdom: Animalia
- Phylum: Mollusca
- Class: Gastropoda
- Order: Systellommatophora
- Family: Veronicellidae
- Genus: Sarasinula
- Species: S. dubia

Binomial name
- Sarasinula dubia (Semper, 1885)

Synonyms
- Vaginulus dubia Semper, 1885; Veronicella discrepans Thiele, 1927

Species of gastropod

Sarasinula dubia is a species of air-breathing land slug, a terrestrial pulmonate gastropod mollusk in the family Veronicellidae, the leatherleaf slugs.

== Distribution ==
Distribution of Sarasinula dubia include:

- Mexico
- Brazil
