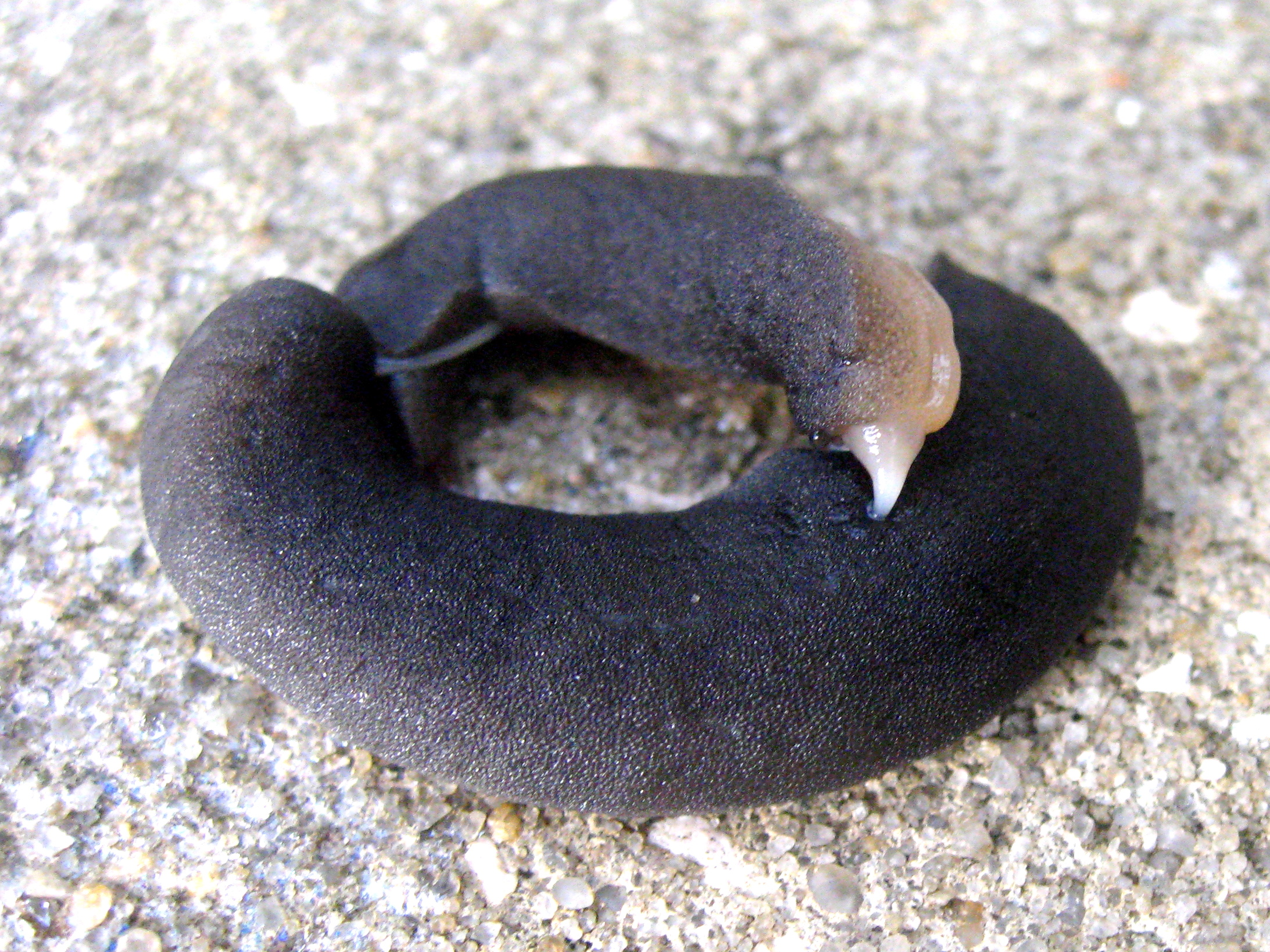
- mating of Belocaulus angustipes

Scientific classification
- Kingdom: Animalia
- Phylum: Mollusca
- Class: Gastropoda
- Order: Systellommatophora
- Family: Veronicellidae
- Genus: Belocaulus; Hoffmann, 1925

Diversity
- 2 species

= Belocaulus =

Genus of gastropods

Belocaulus is a genus of air-breathing land slugs, terrestrial pulmonate gastropod mollusks in the family Veronicellidae, the leatherleaf slugs.

== Species ==
- Belocaulus angustipes (Heynemann, 1885)
- Belocaulus willibaldoi Ohlweiler & Gomes, 2009
