= Simrothula =

Scientific classification
- Kingdom: Animalia
- Phylum: Mollusca
- Class: Gastropoda
- Order: Systellommatophora
- Family: Veronicellidae
- Genus: Simrothula; Thomé, 1975

Genus of gastropods

Simrothula is a genus of air-breathing land slugs, terrestrial pulmonate gastropod mollusks in the family Veronicellidae, the leatherleaf slugs.

== Species ==
Species within the genus Simrothula include:

- Simrothula paraensis
