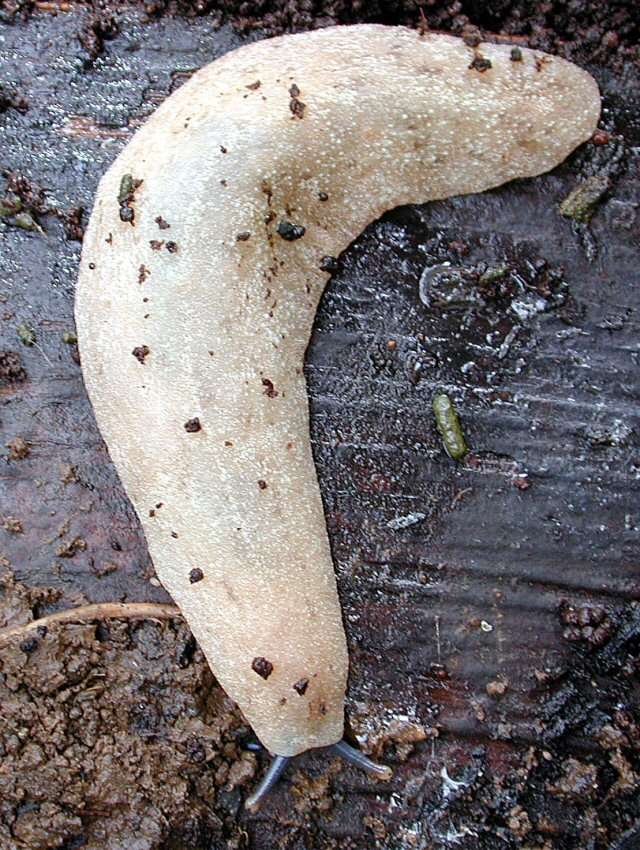
- A live individual of Veronicella sloanii, head end towards the bottom of the image

Conservation status
- Secure (NatureServe)

Scientific classification
- Kingdom: Animalia
- Phylum: Mollusca
- Class: Gastropoda
- Order: Systellommatophora
- Family: Veronicellidae
- Genus: Veronicella
- Species: V. sloanii

Binomial name
- Veronicella sloanii (Cuvier, 1817)

Synonyms
- Veronicella sloanei (Cuvier, 1817); Onchidium sloanii Cuvier, 1817; Veronicella laevis Blainville, 1817; Vaginula sloanei partim.; Vaginula sloanii sloanii partim.; Vaginula sloanii schivelyae

= Veronicella sloanii =

Species of gastropod

Veronicella sloanii, commonly called the pancake slug, is a species of air-breathing land slug, a terrestrial, pulmonate gastropod mollusk in the family Veronicellidae, the leatherleaf slugs.

== Description ==
When extended, this slug can attain a length of 12 cm (5 in.). It is highly variable in coloration and positive identification depends on dissection and inspection of the genitalia. It is usually very pale in color, ranging from mottle pale yellow, cream to white. It may have irregular black spotting or speckling all over the dorsal surface that may coalesce into two poorly defined bands running down either side of the body; in the juveniles, these two bands may be clearer and better defined as grey bands, especially anteriorly. Occasionally the slug can be mostly brownish. The only constant color character among different Caribbean island populations is the eye stalk, which is bluish grey with a light brown tip.

== Distribution ==
The indigenous distribution of Veronicella sloanii is Jamaica. The type locality is in Jamaica.

Other non-indigenous distribution includes:

- Barbados
- Bermuda
- Dominica - first report from Dominica in 2009
- Dominican Republic
- Saint Lucia
- Saint Vincent
- Cuba (Bahia Honda in Pinar del Río Province).

This slug has been introduced to Florida and it has become an agricultural pest there.

Controversially Cowie et al. (2009) considered this species has not yet become established in the US, but it is considered to represent a potentially serious threat as a pest, an invasive species which could negatively affect agriculture, natural ecosystems, human health or commerce. Therefore, it has been suggested that this species be given top national quarantine significance in the USA.

== Ecology ==
=== Habitat ===
This slug lives in moist conditions and is nocturnal.

The best times to hunt for the slug is after rainfall. They rest under boards, logs and other objects lying on the ground.

=== Feeding habits ===
This species attacks a wide variety of agricultural and horticultural plants including banana, plantain, various beans and peas, peanut, eggplant, cultivars of Brassica (e.g., broccoli, cabbage, cauliflower), carrot, hot and sweet peppers, various citrus species, lettuce, sweet potato, dasheen, eddoe, tannia, tomato, and yam.

=== Life cycle ===
The slug lays a clutch of about 30 eggs, which are about 5 mm in diameter. The hatching time in captivity was 15 days at 24 °C.

== Importance for humans ==
This species is an agricultural pest.

They should not be handled with bare hands because they serve as intermediate hosts of the nematode Angiostrongylus costaricensis, which causes a disease called human abdominal angiostrongyliasis.
