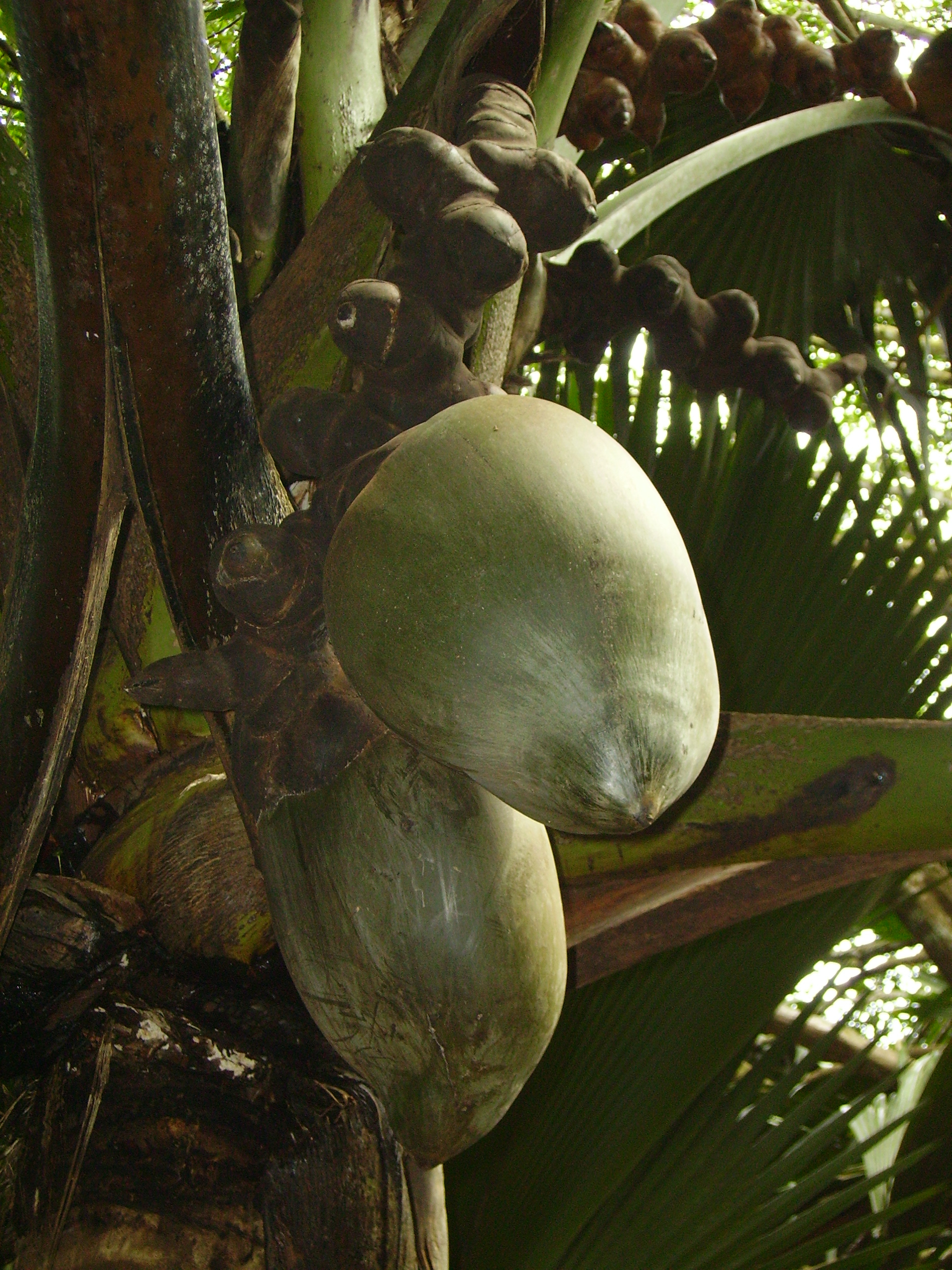
- Habit, with fruit

Conservation status
- Endangered (IUCN 3.1)
- CITES Appendix III

Scientific classification
- Kingdom: Plantae
- Clade: Tracheophytes
- Clade: Angiosperms
- Clade: Monocots
- Clade: Commelinids
- Order: Arecales
- Family: Arecaceae
- Subfamily: Coryphoideae
- Tribe: Borasseae
- Genus: Lodoicea; Comm. ex DC.
- Species: L. maldivica

Binomial name
- Lodoicea maldivica (J.F.Gmelin) Persoon

Synonyms
- List: Borassus sonneratii Giseke; Cocos maldivica J.F.Gmel.; Cocos maritima Comm. ex H.Wendl.; Lodoicea callypige Comm. ex J.St.Hil.; Lodoicea sechellarum Labill.; Lodoicea sonneratii (Giseke) Baill.

= Lodoicea =

Genus of plant, Coco de Mer

Lodoicea, commonly known as the sea coconut, coco de mer, or double coconut, is a monotypic genus in the palm family. The sole species, Lodoicea maldivica, is endemic to the islands of Praslin and Curieuse in the Seychelles in the Indian Ocean, and was historically found on the neighboring small islets of St Pierre, Chauve-Souris, and Ile Ronde. The species has the largest seed in the plant kingdom.

== Taxonomy ==
The name of the genus Lodoicea was given by Philibert Commerson, without any explanation for its etymology. It may be derived from Lodoicus, a Latinised form of Louis (typically Ludovicus), in honour of King Louis XV, while other sources say that Lodoicea is from Laodice, the daughter of Priam and Hecuba.

Lodoicea belongs to the subfamily Coryphoideae and tribe Borasseae. Borasseae is represented by four genera in Madagascar and one in Seychelles out of the seven worldwide. They are distributed on the coasts surrounding the Indian Ocean and the existing islands within. Borassus, the genus closest to Lodoicea, has about five species in the Old World, one species in Africa, one in India, South-East Asia and Malaysia, one in New Guinea and two species in Madagascar.

== Description ==
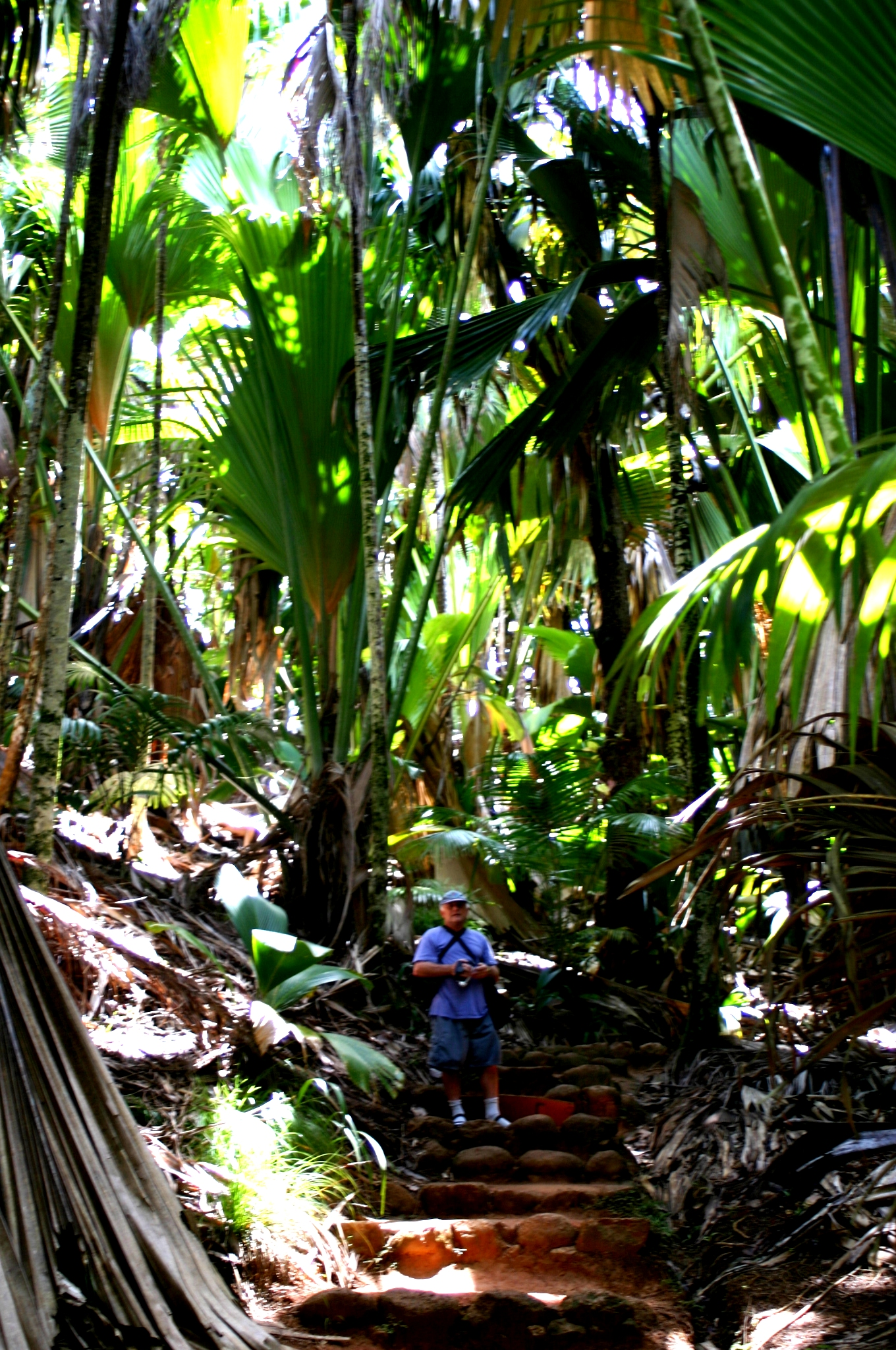
The Vallée de Mai palm forest in Praslin

=== Habit ===
L. maldivica is robust, it grows solitary up to 25–34 m (82–112 ft) tall. Its stem is erect and spineless is ringed with leaf scars (Calstrom, unpublished). The base of the trunk is of a bulbous form and this bulb fits into a natural bowl, or socket, about 75 cm (30 in) in diameter and 45 cm (18 in) deep, narrowing towards the bottom. This bowl is pierced with hundreds of small oval holes about the size of a thimble with hollow tubes corresponding on the outside through which the roots penetrate the ground on all sides, never, however, becoming attached to the bowl; they are partially elastic, affording an almost imperceptible but very necessary "play" to the parent stem when struggling against the force of violent gales.

The crown is a rather dense head of foliage with leaves that are stiff, palmate up to 10 m (33 ft) in diameter and petioles of two to four metres in length.

=== Leaves ===
The leaf is plicate at the base, cut one third or more into segments 4–10 cm (1.6–3.9 in) broad with bifid end which are often drooping. A triangular cleft develops at the petiole base. The palm leaves form a huge funnel that intercepts particulate material, especially pollen, which is flushed to the base of the trunk when it rains. In this way, L. maldivica improves its nutrient supply and that of its dispersal-limited offspring. The leaves are fan-shaped, 7–10 m (23–33 ft) long and 4.5 m (15 ft) wide with a 4 m (13 ft) petiole in mature plants. However, juveniles produce much longer petioles, up to 9 m (30 ft) long.

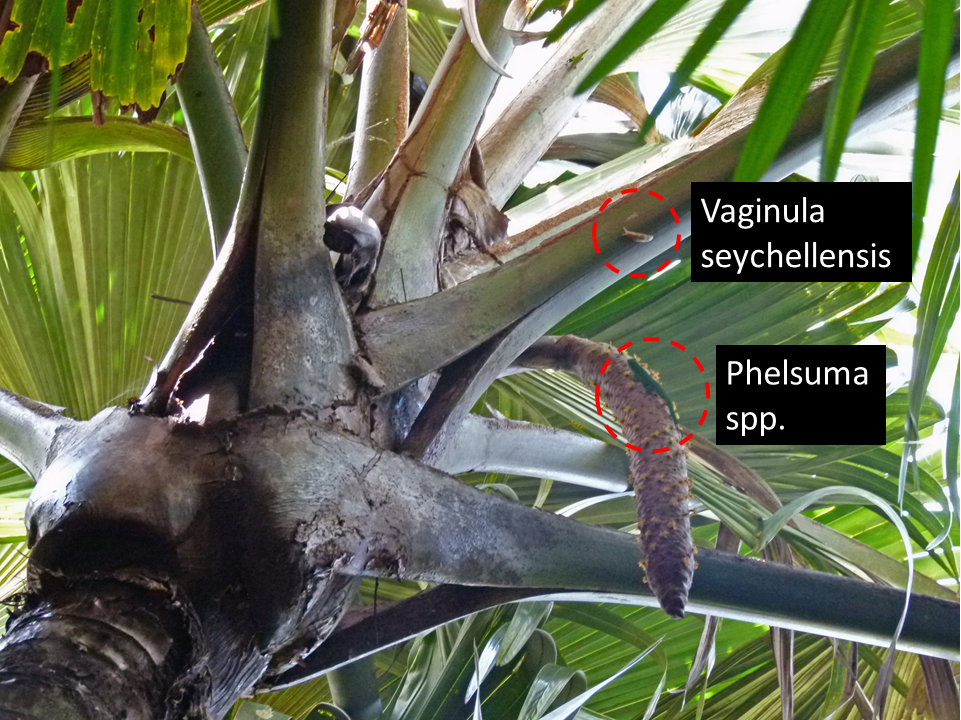
Two endemic species on a coco de mer in Vallée de Mai (March 2016)

=== Flowers ===
It is dioecious, with separate male and female plants. The male flowers are arranged in a catkin-like inflorescence up to 2 m (7 ft) long which continues to produce pollen over a ten-year period; one of the longest-living inflorescences known.

The clusters of staminate flowers are arranged spirally and are flanked by very tough leathery bracts. Each has a small bracteole, three sepals forming a cylindrical tube, and a three-lobed corolla. There are 17 to 22 stamens. The pistillate flowers are solitary and borne at the angles of the rachis and are partially sunken in it in the form of a cup. They are ovoid with three petals as well as three sepals. It has been suggested that they may be pollinated by animals such as the endemic lizards that inhabit the forest where they occur. Pollination by wind and rain are also thought to be important. Only when it begins to produce flowers, which can vary from 11 to 45 years or more old, is it possible to determine the sex of the plant visually. The nectar and pollen are also food for several endemic animals e.g. bright green geckos (Phelsuma sp.), white slugs (Vaginula seychellensis) and insects.

=== Inflorescence ===
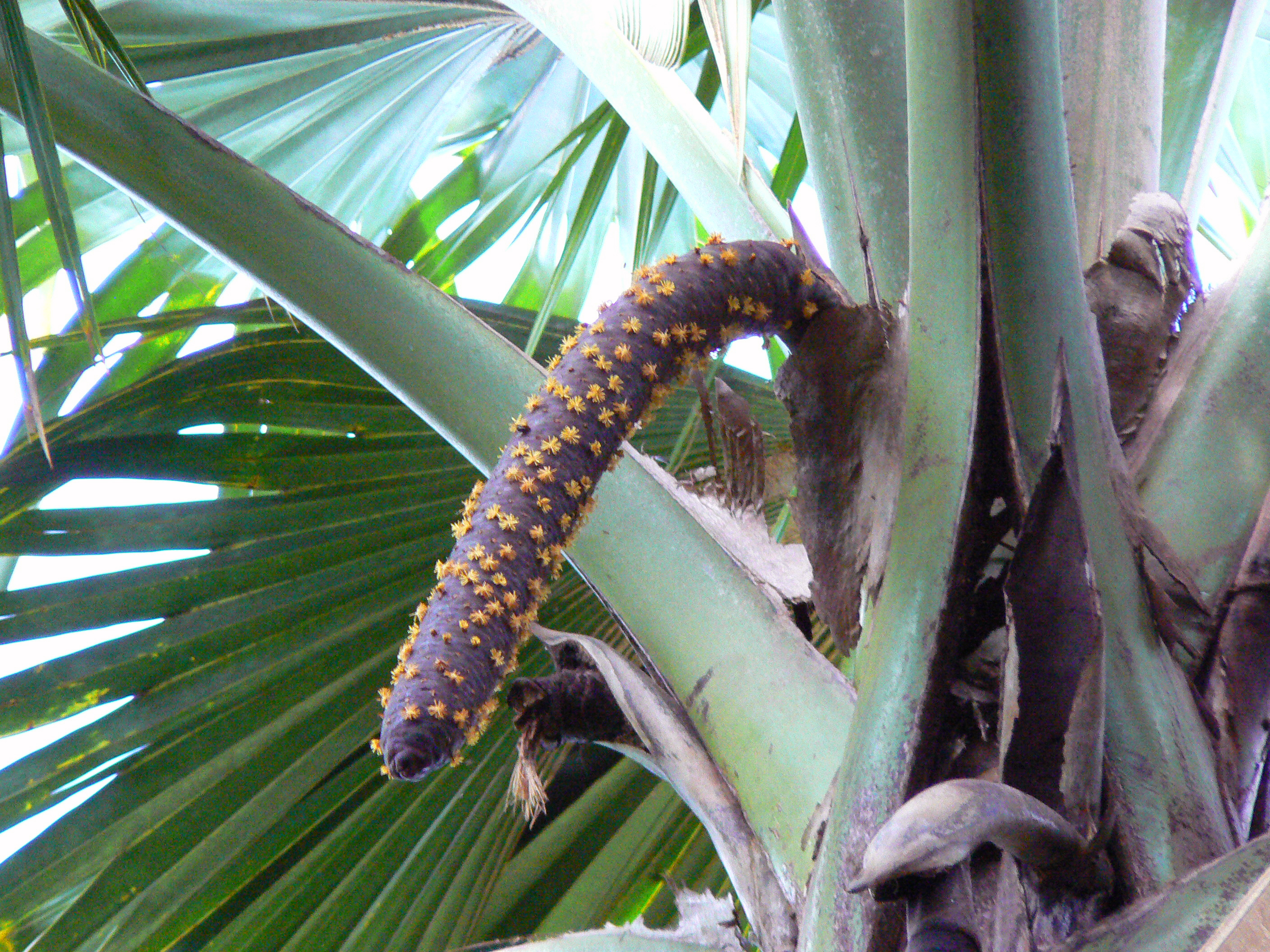
Male inflorescence

The inflorescences are interfoliar, lacking a covering spathe and shorter than the leaves. The staminate inflorescence is catkin-like, 1 to 2 m (3.3 to 6.6 ft) long by about 8 cm (3 in) in width and produces pollen over a period of 8 to 10 years. These catkins are generally terminal and solitary, but sometimes two or three catkins may be present. The pistillate inflorescences are also one to two metres long, unbranched, and the flowers are borne on a zig-zagging rachilla.

=== Fruit ===
The mature fruit is 40–50 cm (16–20 in) in diameter and weighs 25–45 kg (55–99 lb), and contains the largest seed in the plant kingdom. The fruit, which requires 6–7 years to mature and a further two years to germinate, is sometimes also referred to as the sea coconut, love nut, double coconut, coco fesse, or Seychelles nut.

The fruit is bilobed, flattened, 40 to 50 cm long ovoid and pointed, and contains usually one but occasionally two to four seeds. The epicarp is smooth and the mesocarp is fibrous. The endosperm is thick, relatively hard, hollow and homogenous. The embryo sits in the sinus between the two lobes. During germination, a tubular cotyledonary petiole develops that connects the young plant to the seed. The length of the tube is reported to reach about four metres. In the Vallée de Mai, the tube may be up to 10 m long.

L. maldivica was once believed to be a sea-bean or drift seed, a seed evolved to be dispersed by the sea. However, it is now known that viable nuts are too dense to float, with only rotted-out nuts being found floating on the sea, explaining why the trees are limited in range to just two islands.

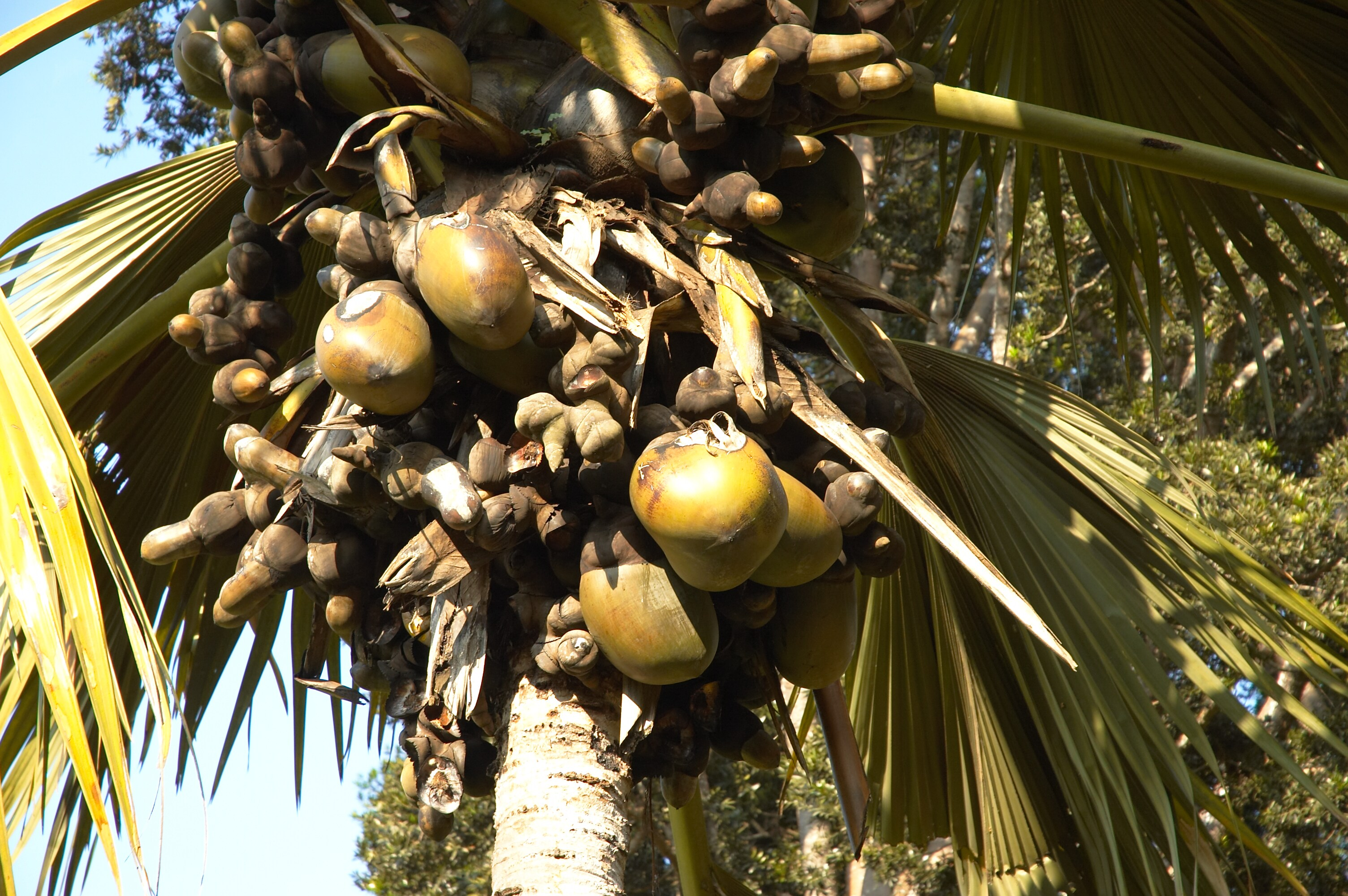
Fruit

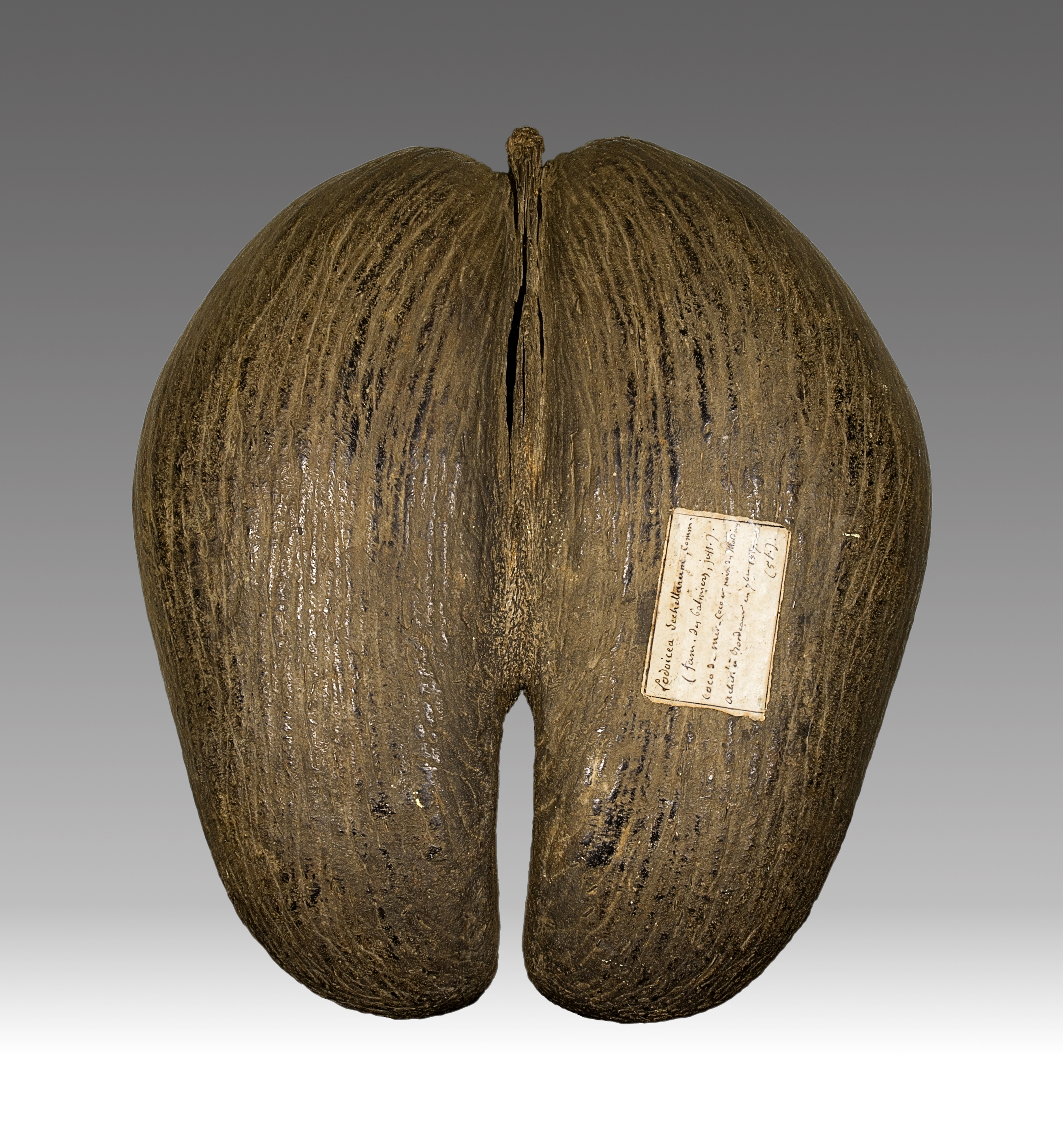
Nut (with outer husk removed), with affixed label designating its origin

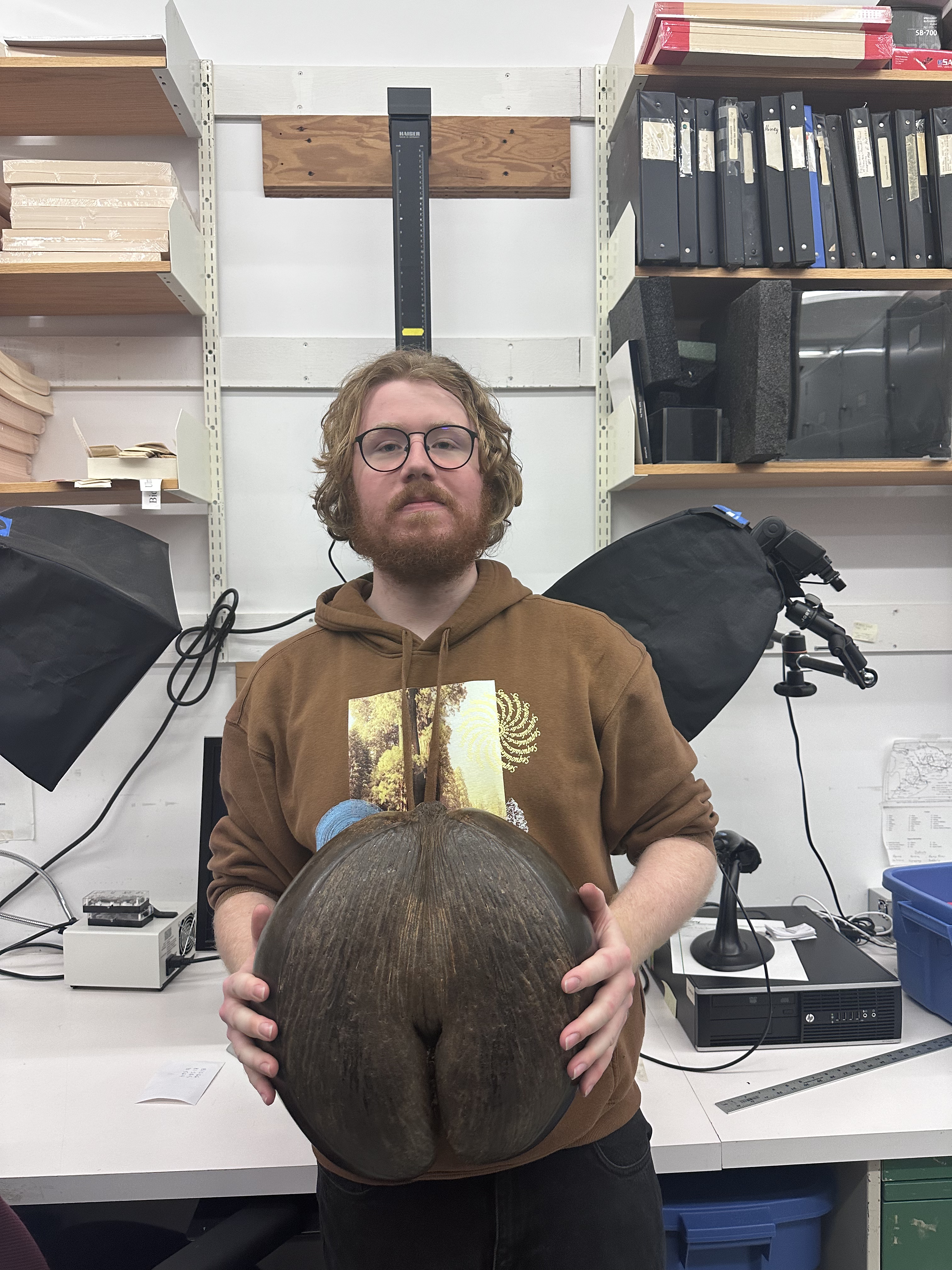
Lodoicea maldivica seed at the Royal Ontario Museum's green plant herbarium

While the functional characteristics of Lodoicea are similar to other trees of monodominant forests in the humid tropics, its unique features include a huge seed, effective funnelling mechanism and diverse community of closely associated animals. These attributes suggest a long evolutionary history under relatively stable conditions. Of the six monospecific endemic palms in Seychelles, Lodoicea is the "only true case of island gigantism among Seychelles flowering plants, a unique feature of Seychelles vegetation". It holds a number of botanical records:

- It produces the heaviest fruit of any palm, weighing up to 25–45 kg (55–99 lb).
- The fruit is composed of three carpels which are the largest of any flowering plant (although the carpels of Entada spp. are longer).
- These fruit are the slowest to mature, requiring 8 to 10 years.
- The mature seeds weighing 10–25 kg (22–55 lb) are the world's heaviest.
- The seed upon germinating, produces the longest known cotyledon, up to 4 m (13 ft). and on occasion as long as 10 m (33 ft).
- It is the slowest growing of all large trees, although some small to medium-sized desert trees are slower. At the Peradenaya Royal Botanic Gardens, it grew an average of 33 mm (1 in) per year over a period of 40 years.
- The female flowers are the largest of any palm, up to 10 cm (3.9 in) diameter.
- The male catkins, up to 2 m (7 ft) in length, are the longest known.
- The sepals, which grow with the fruit, are the largest known; up to 23 cm (9 in) long by 15 cm (6 in) wide.
- The leaves of Lodoicea have the longest lifespan of any monocot, nine years to develop in the terminal spike, and then nine more years as a fully functioning leaf. However, adult Lodoicea can have as many as twenty leaves with a potential lifespan of 24 years.
- Finally, Lodoicea is the most efficient plant known at recovering nutrients from moribund leaves.

Of the six endemic palms in Seychelles, it is the only dioecious species, with male and female flowers on different plants.

== Habitat ==
Lodoicea maldivica inhabits rainforests where there are deep, well-drained soils and open exposed slopes; although growth is reduced on such eroded soils.

== Phylogeny ==
Despite the proximity of the Seychelles to Africa, the broader diversity of palm life on the islands are considered to be slightly closer phylogenetically to that of south Asia; with members of the palm subtribe Oncospermatinae occurring both in the Seychelles group and in the Mascarene Islands, Sri Lanka, Borneo, the Malay Peninsula, and the Philippines. A genetic sequencing study of Lodoicea and other palms showed similarity between south Asiatic palms and Lodoicea. Lodoicea is one of four genera in the Lataniieae subtribe of the tribe Borrassae, and sequencing found them to be very closely related to Borassus and Borassodendron, although notably the phylogenetic placement of Lodoicea was among the least confident. The genera Borassus and Borassodendron together include species in Southeast Asia, Malaysia, India, New Guinea, and Madagascar; thus this study provided genetic evidence for the suspected close relationships between Lodoicea and south Asian palms.

== Dispersal ==
Genetic similarity between Lodoicea and south Asian palms, despite their geographical distance, raises questions about ancestral historical dispersal of Lodoicea to the Seychelles; and this natural history of Lodoicea is further obscured by the geology of the Seychelles, as the entirety of the archipelago (excluding some Pleistocene and coral reef formations) is composed of non-fossiliferous rock. As such, the prehistoric origins of Seychelles flora is inferred using circumstantial geological and botanical evidence.

=== Geologic drift-dispersal hypothesis ===
The ancestral dispersal to the Seychelles may have occurred as Tertiary palm relatives native to Gondwanaland rode the Indian subcontinent during its northward continental drift, whereupon populations were deposited on the modern day Seychelles. This hypothesis derives from the geologic formation of the Seychelles themselves, and offers a strong explanation of the modern day relationship of Lodoicea to Asiatic palms. The granite which forms the majority of the Seychelles archipelago was formed within the Indian subcontinent, and was deposited in its modern-day location in the Indian Ocean following the detachment and northern drift of the subcontinent from Gondwana, before colliding with modern-day south-Asia ~50 mya. Divergence between the palm populations would then follow from the isolation of the archipelago from the rest of Gondwonaland. Evidence suggests at least a proportion of the diversity of Flora on the islands are of "very ancient origin", perhaps being evidence of the persistence of some aboriginal Indian subcontinental species, of which the ancestors of Lodoicea may have been a member. The plausibility of this hypothesis is dependent on whether the Seychelles remained at least in part above sea-level for the duration of their formation, as a complete inundation with sea water at any point during the formation of the islands would have killed any aboriginal flora. Whether such an inundation ever occurred during the formation of the Seychelles is unknown.

=== Oceanic dispersal hypothesis ===
A 2020 genetic-sequencing study of palm species found genetic evidence for an oceanic dispersal of the ancestors to modern Lataniieae palms, from south Asia to the Mascarene and Seychelle islands. Though modern viable coco de mer fruit are too heavy to float and thus would be unable to disperse oceanically, genetic evidence suggests that ancestors to Lataniieae palms underwent evolutionary periods of relatively rapid increases in seed size, with Lodoicea serving as the most extreme example. Thus, the ancestors of Lodoicea may have possessed small enough seeds for oceanic dispersal to be viable, with an evolutionary increase in seed size occurring in the Seychelles after its ancestral dispersal. Furthermore, it is likely that at certain points during the geologic formation of the Seychelles, the oceanic gaps between landmasses were much smaller, making oceanic dispersal more viable still. As such, a combination of the two hypotheses, wherein ancestral palms native to the Indian subcontinent rode the subcontinent during continental drift, and then dispersed oceanically to the Seychelles after their formation, but while the rest of the Indian subcontinent was relatively nearby.

== Evolution of the coco de mer fruit's size ==
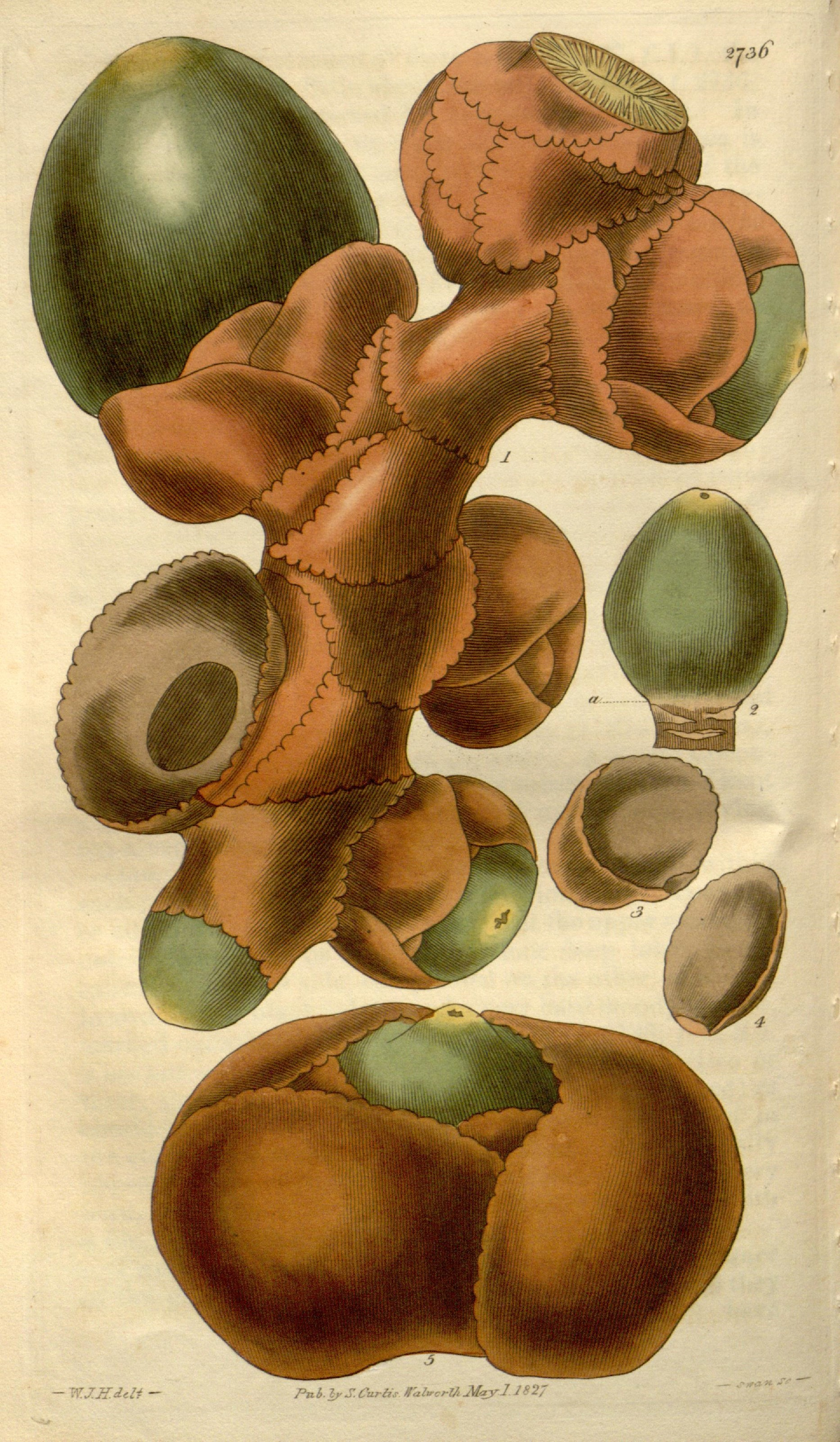

Despite their relative recency of this divergence from the common ancestor shared with other palms, Lodoicea is unique across a variety of traits. Though Lodoicea is not the only palm in its tribe that produces very large fruit, the syncarpous clade of palms exhibit wide variation in seed sizes, ranging from the seeds of the Caryoteae palms of only several millimetres, to the seeds of Borasseae which are often several centimetres in length (Lodoicea is the most extreme example of this group). For this reason, the ecological and genetic factors explaining the large size of Lodoicea fruit to such an extreme are of interest to evolutionary biologists. The divergence of size in Lodoicea fruit subsequent to its isolation from ancestors has been cited as an example of island gigantism, which describes the tendency for traits or organisms to increase in size over evolutionary time subsequent to isolation from a primary population on an island (see also island biogeography). One hypothesis for the ecological driver of the development of the large seed of Lodoicea is the historic lack of ground dwelling mammalian predators on the Seychelles, allowing for large fruit on the ground to avoid predation for long enough for their large energy stores to be effectively used by growing offspring. Agricultural surveys of the Seychelles tend to categorize the islands as having very shallow, nutrient-poor soils, and the life-cycle of the coco de mer often involves a very long period of subterranean transversal of the primary apical shoot after fertilization and excision from the parent tree, wherein the growing plant cannot use solar radiation to undergo photosynthesis, These facts may jointly act as evolutionary incentives for the development of large, nutrient rich fruit, to feed the growing plant and increase likelihood of successful reproduction.

Competition may also be the driving factor in the evolution of the size of Lodoicea fruit. One hypothesis asserts that competition between parent tree and its progeny, as well as competition between sibling offspring, drove the large size of the coco de mer fruit. The hypothesis suggests that because coco de mer fruit fall directly at the base of their parental tree, there is strong competition between parent and offspring for resources, within which the already-established parent tree has a large asymmetric advantage. Furthermore, as the number of offspring produced by a specific parent increases, the number of individuals growing its immediate surroundings increases, and thus the competition for resources between its offspring worsens. Therefore, there exists a selective pressure favouring the production of fewer offspring, each with a maximal chance of successfully reaching adulthood conferred by large energy reserves in the fruit. A related hypothesis states that low light availability in the rainforest understory favoured juveniles which could quickly produce tall and wide initial leaves, to maximize photosynthetic area as quickly as possible; which would be made possible by a large, nutrient-rich seed. This is perhaps corroborated by the coco de mer's noted ability to quickly produce a very large first stem and leaf, perhaps suggesting that fast and robust initial growth is indeed heavily selected towards. It is also noteworthy that many of the hypotheses presented to explain the size of Lodoicea fruit are not mutually exclusive, and could act jointly.

== History and mythology ==
The species was formerly known as the Maldive coconut. Its scientific name, Lodoicea maldivica, originated before the 18th century when the Seychelles were uninhabited. In centuries past, the fruit that fell from the trees and ended up in the sea would be carried away eastwards by the prevailing sea currents. The nuts can only float after the germination process, when they are hollow. In this way many drifted to the Maldives where they were gathered from the beaches and valued as an important trade and medicinal item.

Until the true source of the nut was discovered in 1768 by Dufresne, it was believed by many to grow on a mythical tree at the bottom of the sea. European nobles in the sixteenth century would often have the shells of these nuts polished and decorated with valuable jewels as collectibles for their private galleries. The coco de mer tree is now a rare and protected species.

== Uses ==
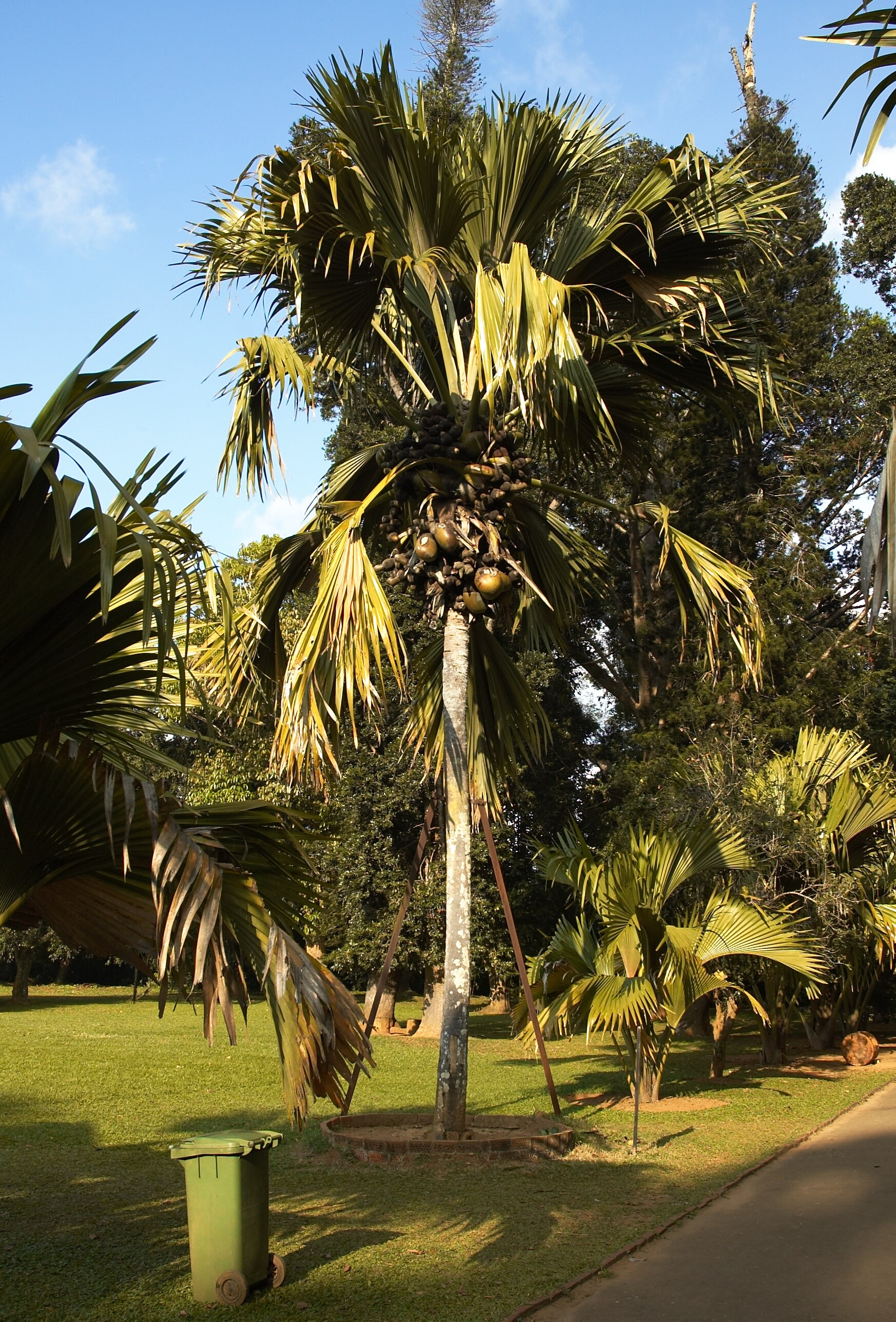
Tree in a Sri Lanka botanic garden

The species is grown as an ornamental tree in many areas in the tropics (including, for example, botanical gardens in Sri Lanka and Thailand), and subsidiary populations have been established on Mahé and Silhouette Islands in the Seychelles to help conserve the species.

The seeds of Lodoicea have been highly prized over the centuries; their rarity caused great interest and high prices in royal courts, and the tough outer seed coat has been used to make bowls such as for Sufi/Dervish beggar-alms kashkul bowls and other instruments.

== Threats ==
Lodoicea maldivica is officially classified as an endangered species by the International Union for Conservation of Nature (IUCN), with only approximately 8,000 wild mature trees left as of 2019. The history of exploitation continues today, and the collection of nuts has virtually stopped all natural regeneration of populations with the exception of the introduced population on Silhouette. This palm has been lost from the wild from three Seychelles islands within its former range. Habitat loss is one of the major threats to the survival of remaining populations, there have been numerous fires on the islands of Praslin and Curieuse, and only immature trees remain over large parts of these islands.

== Conservation ==
The Seychelles is a World Heritage Site, and a third of the area is now protected. The main populations of Lodoicea maldivica are found within the Praslin and Curieuse National Parks, and the trade in nuts is controlled by the Coco-de-mer (Management) Decree of 1995. Firebreaks also exist at key sites in an effort to prevent devastating fires from sweeping through populations. Cultivated palms are grown on a number of other islands and are widely present in botanic gardens; although the collection of seeds in order to recruit these populations may be a further threat to the remaining natural stands. Conservation priorities are the continued protection of populations, enforcement of regulations and effective fire control.

A single cultivated plant at the Botanical Garden of Kolkata, maintained by the Botanical Survey of India, was successfully artificially pollinated in 2015.

== Gallery ==
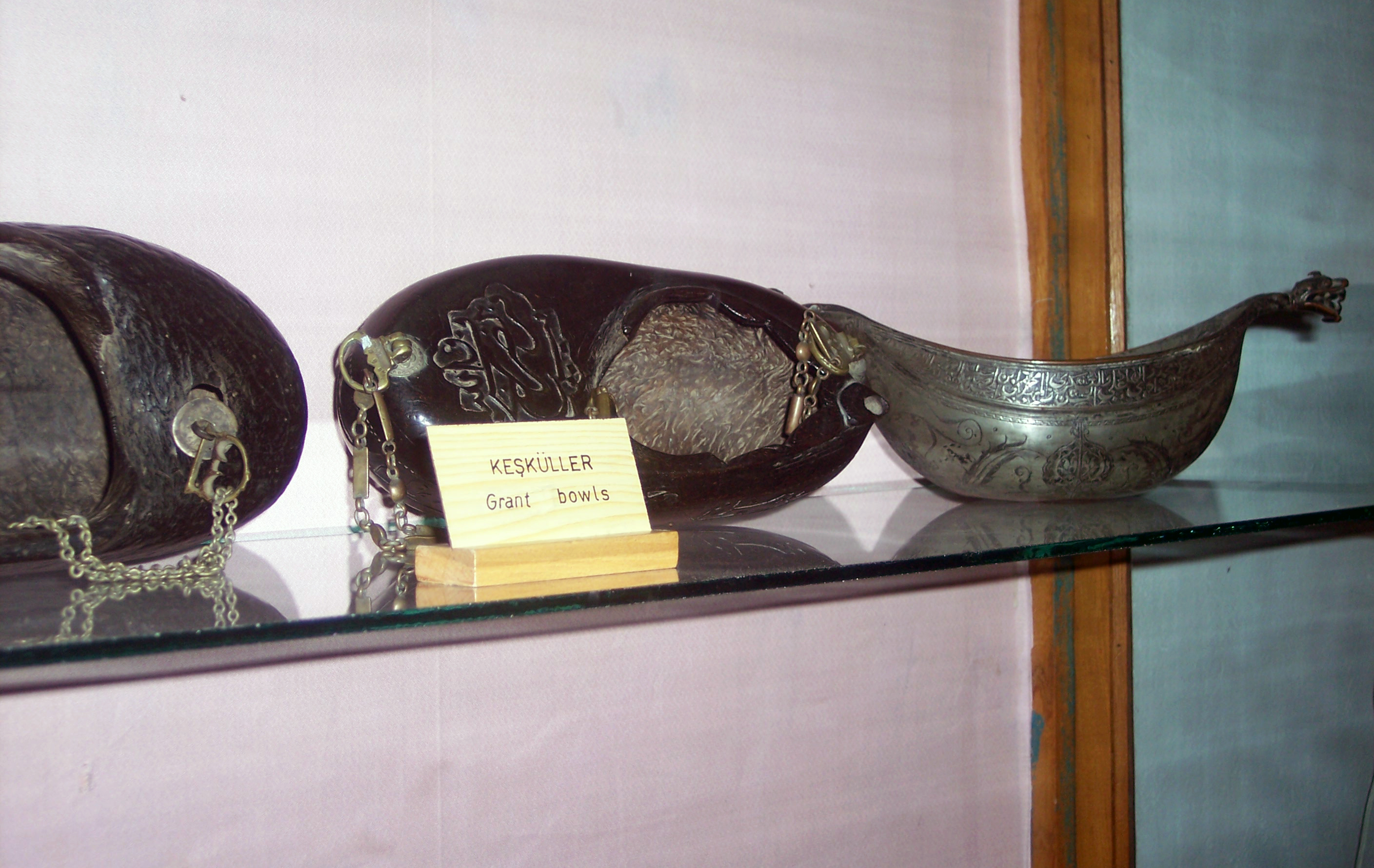
Sufi kashkuls were often made from a coco de mer which would be difficult to find for ordinary beggars.

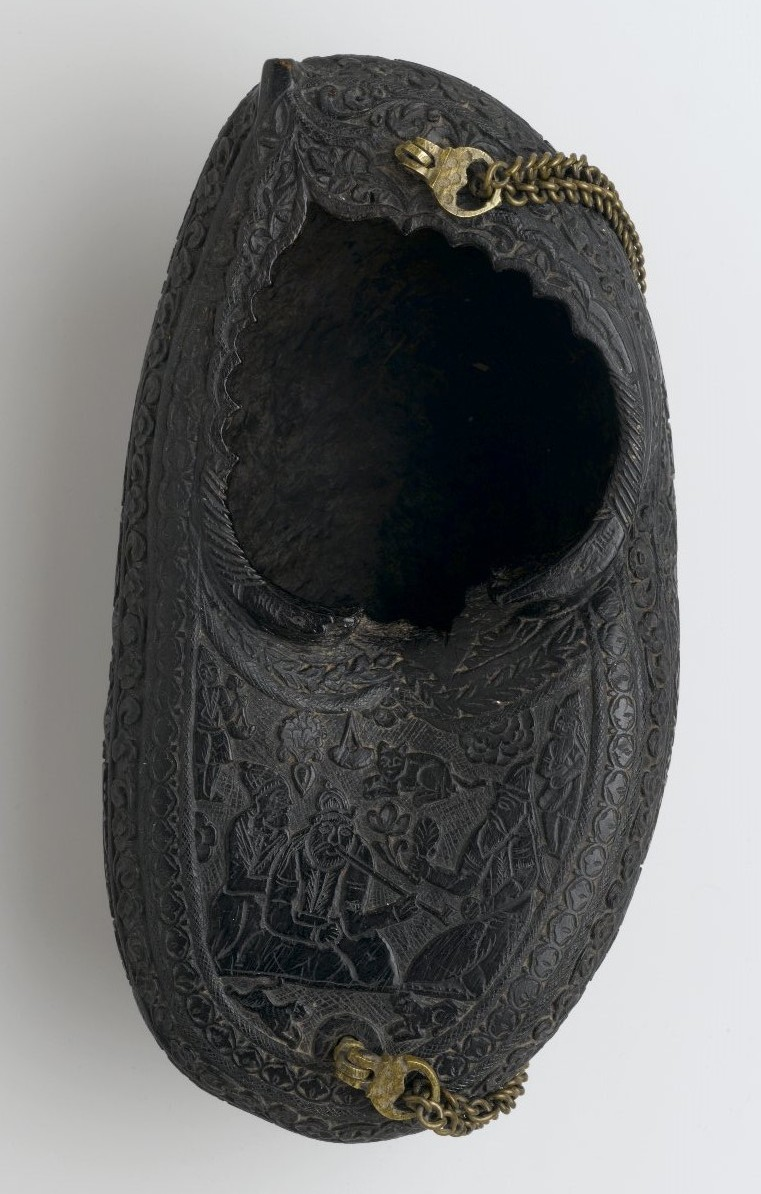
Kashkul with portrait of dervishes and a mounted falconer, A.H. 1280. Brooklyn Museum.
