= Veronicella tenax =

Scientific classification
- Kingdom: Animalia
- Phylum: Mollusca
- Class: Gastropoda
- Order: Systellommatophora
- Family: Veronicellidae
- Genus: Veronicella
- Species: V. tenax

Binomial name
- Veronicella tenax Baker, 1931

Synonyms
- Veronicella (Tenacipes) tenax Baker, 1931; Vaginula tenax; Veronicella tenax; Filicaulis (Tenacipes) sp.; Filicaulis (Tenacipes) tenax (Baker, 1931)

Species of gastropod

Veronicella tenax, common Cuban name is the steak slug, is a species of air-breathing land slug, a terrestrial pulmonate gastropod mollusk in the family Veronicellidae, the leatherleaf slugs.

== Distribution ==
- Cuba - endemic
