= Kashkul =

Container carried by wandering Dervishes

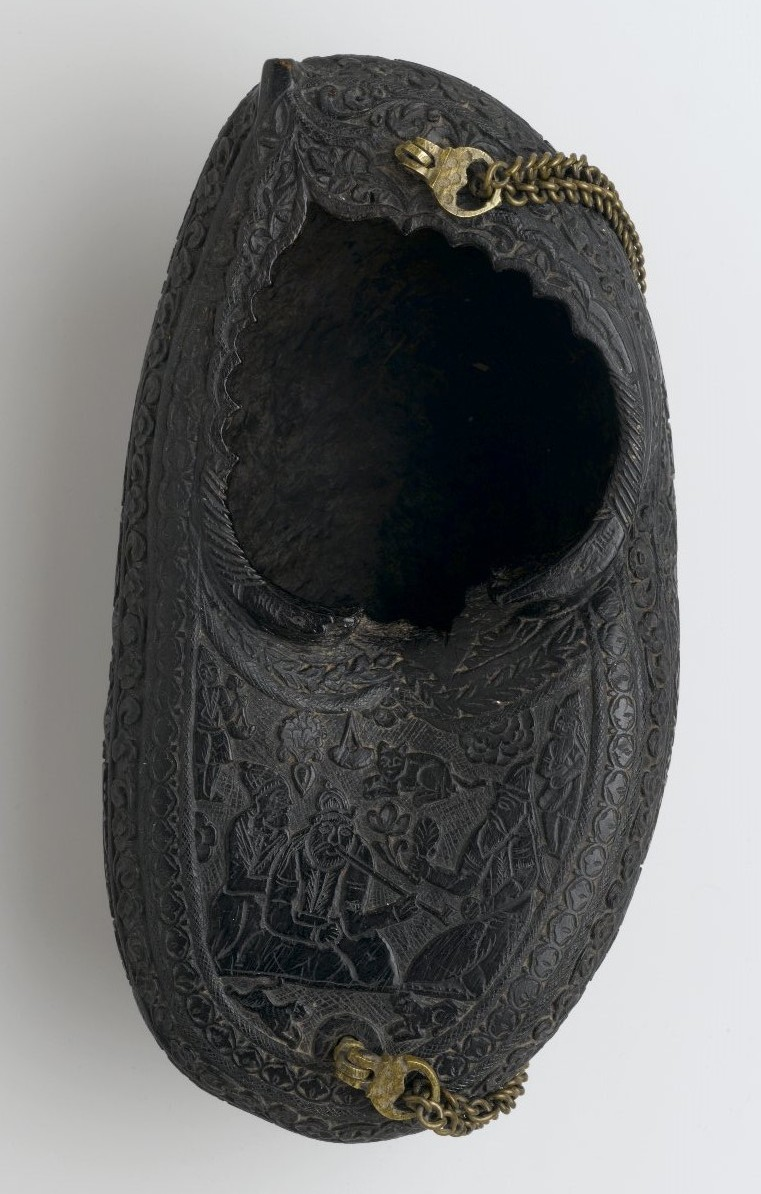
Kashkul, or Beggar's Bowl, with Portrait of Dervishes and a Mounted Falconer, A.H. 1280

Kashkul (Persian: کشکول, Kashkūl, pronounced: kashkool) also referred to as the beggar's bowl, is a container carried by wandering Dervishes (belonging to the Sūfī tradition of Islam) and used to collect money and other goods (sweets, gifts, etc.) usually after a street session of poetry recitation, religious eulogies, advice or entertainment. The container, usually a bowl shaped like a ship, is made out of material such as coco-de-mer shell, clay, metals (usually brass), wood or ceramics and is hung over the shoulder using a metal chain.

== Etymology ==
Kashkūl is a compound word composed of the words konash (کنش) meaning 'to make' and kol (کل) meaning 'complete, full'. The vowel on the first letter of the first word is changed to a instead of o and the sound n (ن) is removed. In the second word, the vowel o is changed to ū. Together it indicates that all of the Dervish's worldly assets are in the container and therefore asking people to fill it through donations and gifts.

== History ==
The exact dates of the usage of the kashkul containers are not known. However, there are metal kashkul containers dated to around the 16th century at the time of the Iranian Safavid dynasty. There are also references to the crescent-shaped kashkuls used to serve wine dated to around the 13th century.

== See also ==
- Dervish
