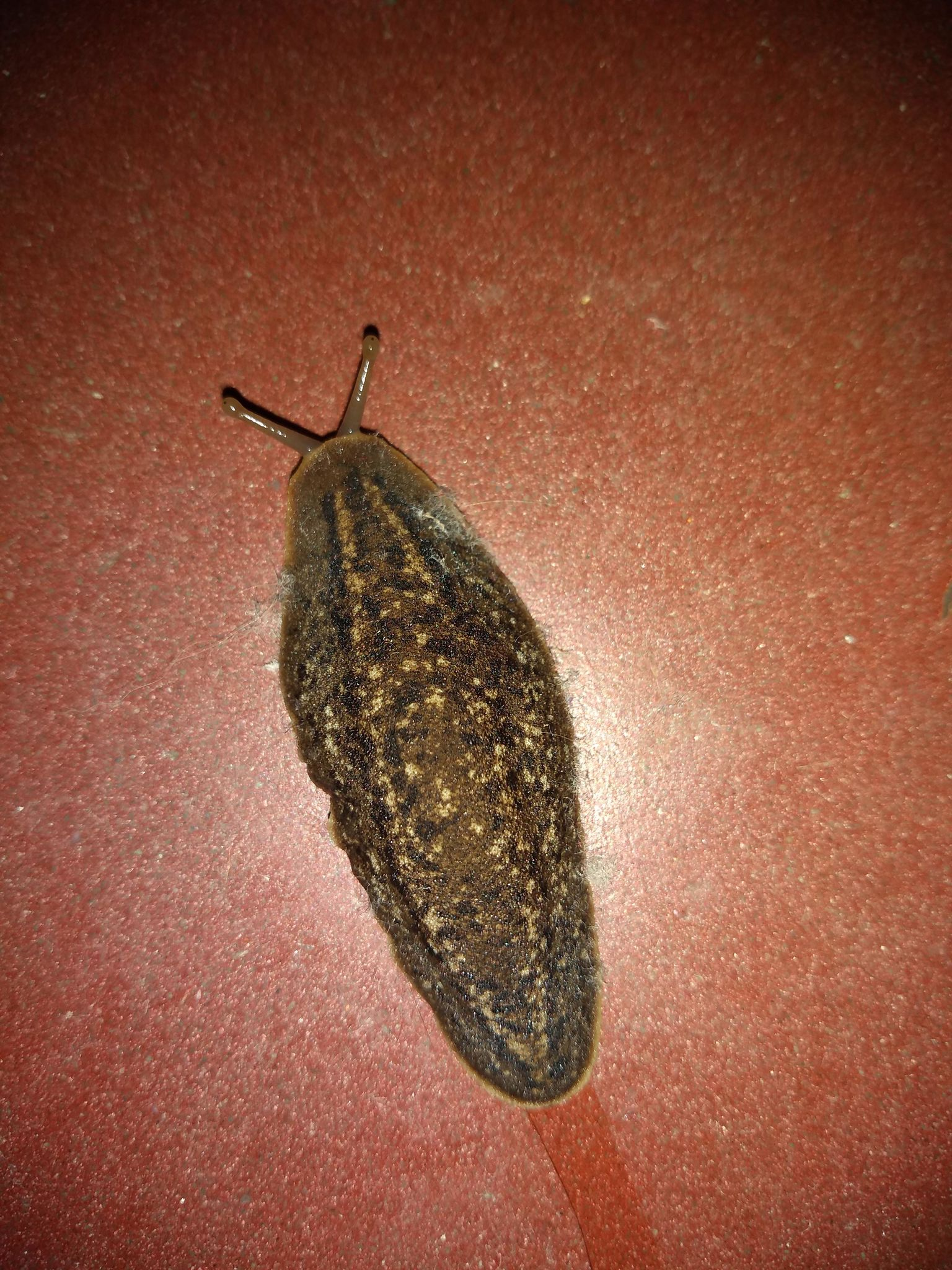
- Phyllocaulis soleiformis

Scientific classification
- Kingdom: Animalia
- Phylum: Mollusca
- Class: Gastropoda
- Order: Systellommatophora
- Family: Veronicellidae
- Genus: Phyllocaulis

= Phyllocaulis =

Genus of gastropods

Phyllocaulis is a genus of land slugs, shell-less terrestrial pulmonate gastropod mollusks in the family Veronicellidae, the leatherleaf slugs. This is a South American genus.

== Species ==
Species within the genus Phyllocaulis include:

- Phyllocaulis boraceiensis
- Phyllocaulis gayi
- Phyllocaulis renschi
- Phyllocaulis soleiformis
- Phyllocaulis tuberculosus
- Phyllocaulis variegatus
