= Angustipes =

Scientific classification
- Kingdom: Animalia
- Phylum: Mollusca
- Class: Gastropoda
- Order: Systellommatophora
- Family: Veronicellidae
- Genus: Angustipes; Colosi, 1922

Genus of gastropods

Angustipes is a genus of air-breathing land slugs, terrestrial pulmonate gastropod mollusks in the family Veronicellidae, the leatherleaf slugs. It is distributed in South America and the northern coast of the Gulf of Mexico. The type species is Vaginula difficilis Colosi, 1921 (now Angustipes difficililis).

== Species ==
- Angustipes abstumpus (Colosi, 1921)
- Angustipes ameghini (Gambetta, 1923)
- Angustipes carceralis Tillier, 1980
- Angustipes difficilis (Colosi, 1921)
- Angustipes erinaceus (Colosi, 1921)
- Angustipes ribeirensis (Thiele, 1927)
- Angustipes robustus (Colosi, 1921)
- Angustipes rosillus (Thiele, 1927)
