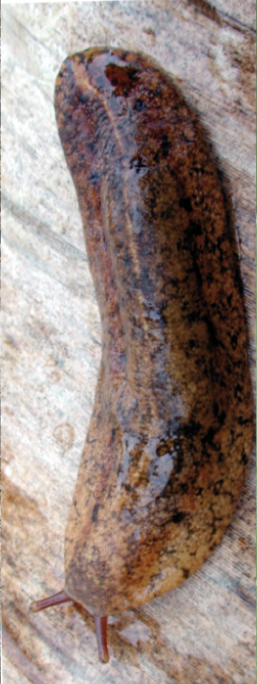
- A live individual of Veronicella cubensis

Conservation status
- Secure (NatureServe)

Scientific classification
- Kingdom: Animalia
- Phylum: Mollusca
- Class: Gastropoda
- Order: Systellommatophora
- Family: Veronicellidae
- Genus: Veronicella
- Species: V. cubensis

Binomial name
- Veronicella cubensis (Pfeiffer, 1840)

Synonyms
- Onchidium sp. Pfeiffer, 1839; Onchidium cubense Pfeiffer, 1840; Vaginulus cubensis Pfeiffer

= Veronicella cubensis =

Species of gastropod

Veronicella cubensis, common name the Cuban slug, is a species of air-breathing land slug, a terrestrial pulmonate gastropod mollusk in the family Veronicellidae, the leatherleaf slugs.

== Description ==
The slug varies widely in color, from almost white or albino, olive tan, to dark brown. Usually, a pale line runs down the center of its back. Dark spots may be apparent on the back or will form two bands running along its sides. However, identifying this slug is best done with a combination of dissection and molecular systematics.

== Distribution ==
The slug is native to Cuba but has been spread outside of its range, where it can be considered an invasive pest.

It's introduced range includes the Caribbean, parts of Micronesia, America Samoa, and the US, particularly Hawaii. Incidents of the slug occur in California, Louisiana, and Florida as well.

V. cubensis is established in the US and considered to represent a potentially serious threat as a pest, an invasive species which may negatively affect agriculture, natural ecosystems, human health and commerce. It has been suggested that this species be given top national quarantine significance in the USA.

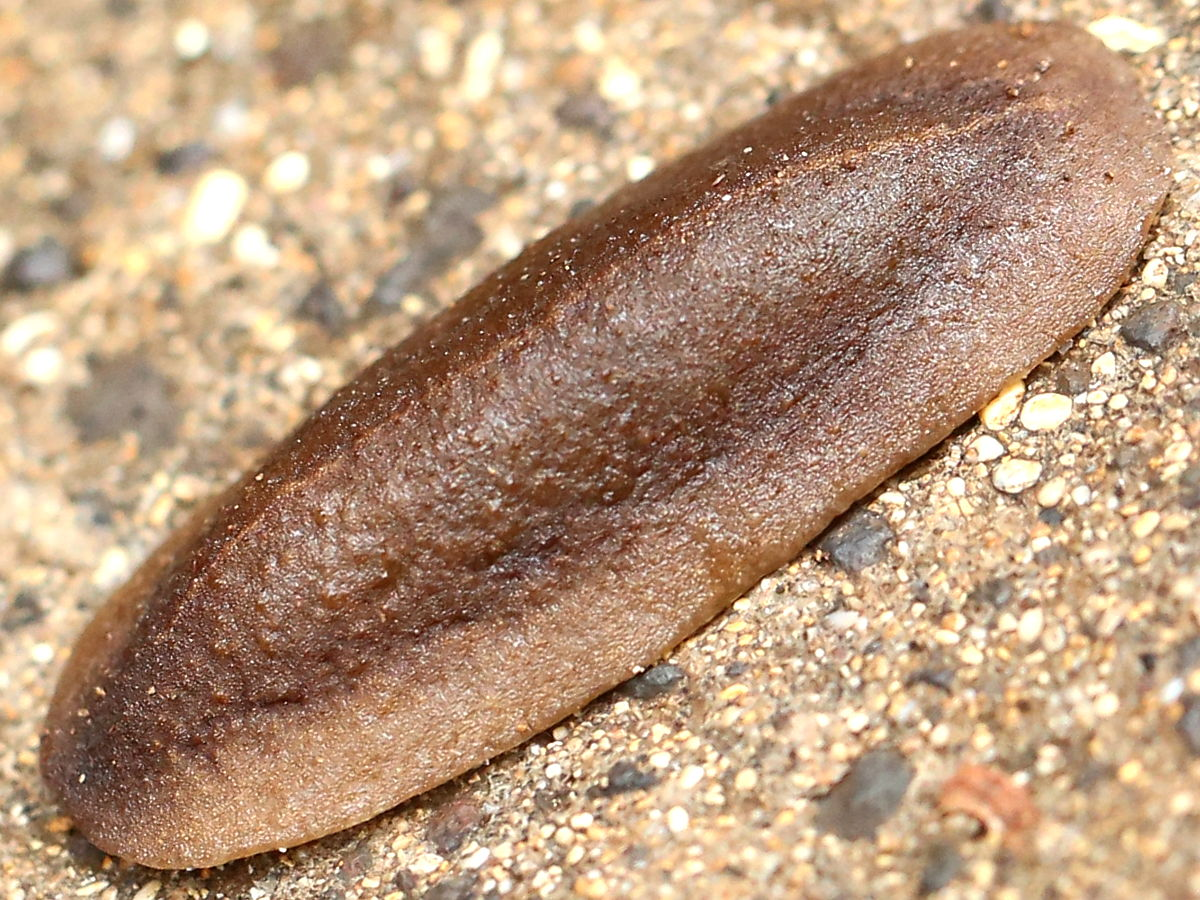
In Molokai, Hawaii

== Ecology and behavior ==
Although self-fertilization is possible in slugs, it has not been observed in V. cubensis. Sperm can be stored for a relatively long time in this species, about 3 months. The slug will lay about 4 egg masses in a year, but as many as 1 egg mass a month. Egg laying begins after the slug reaches 200 days old.
