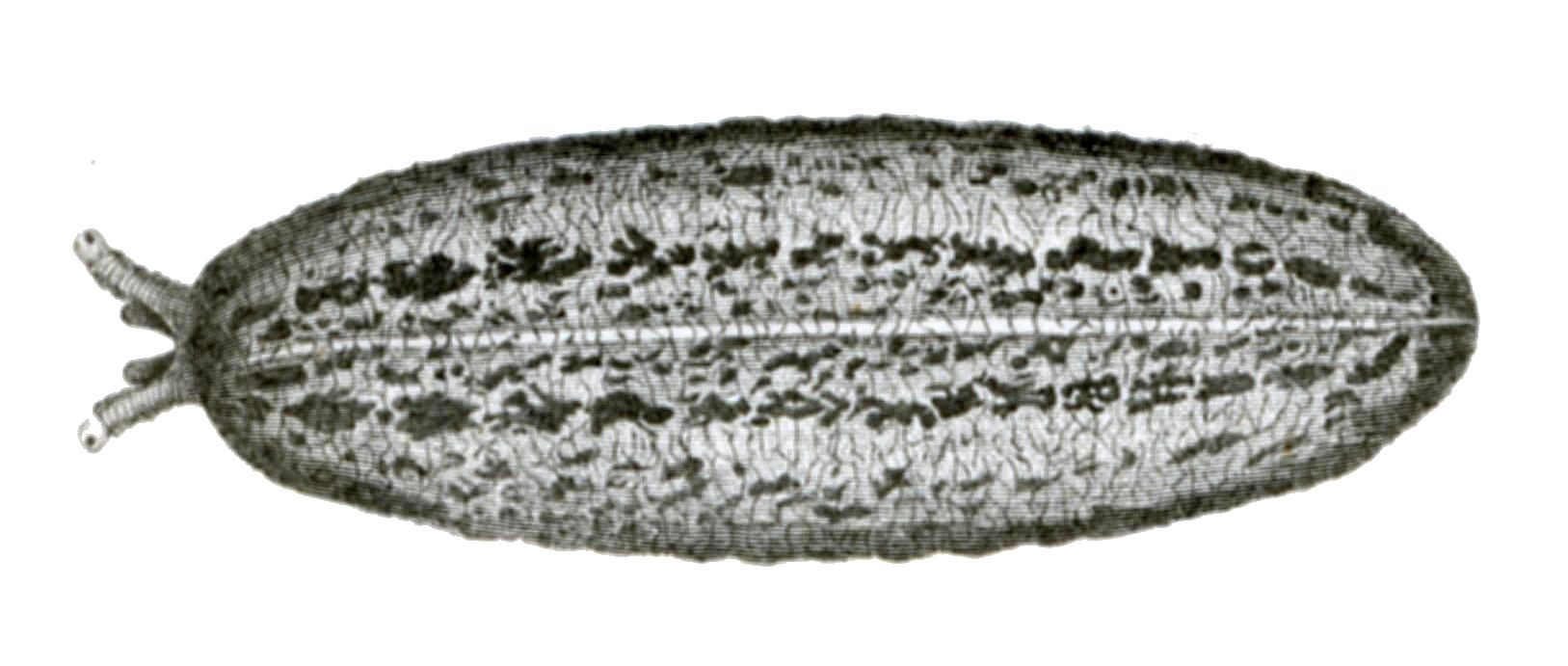
- Leidyula floridana from W. G. Binney, 1878

Conservation status
- Vulnerable (NatureServe)

Scientific classification
- Kingdom: Animalia
- Phylum: Mollusca
- Class: Gastropoda
- Order: Systellommatophora
- Family: Veronicellidae
- Genus: Leidyula
- Species: L. floridana

Binomial name
- Leidyula floridana (Leidy & Binney in Binney, 1851)

Synonyms
- Vaginulus floridanus (Leidy, 1851); Vaginulus floridanus (Binney, 1851); Veronicella floridana (Binney, 1851)

= Leidyula floridana =

Species of gastropod

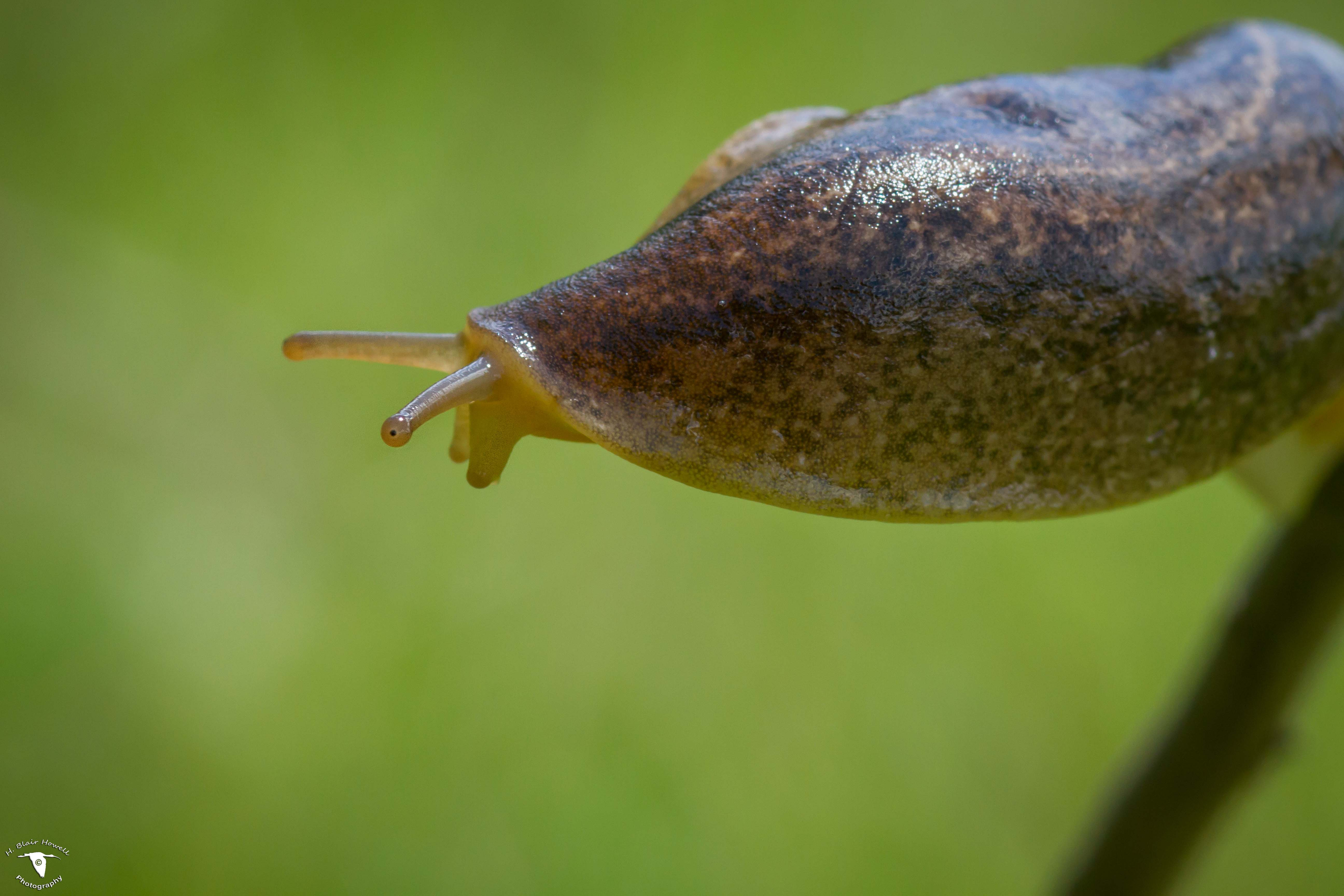
A large Florida leatherleaf slug

Leidyula floridana, common name the Florida leatherleaf, is a species of tropical air-breathing land slug, shell-less terrestrial pulmonate gastropod mollusks in the family Veronicellidae.

== Distribution ==
Leidyula floridana, a slug species native to the Caribbean (Cuba to Jamaica) and southern Florida, has extended its range to northern Florida. It is also found in Louisiana and Texas. As a non-native species, it has been identified in Mexico, Nicaragua, and Cuba.
