= Simrothula paraensis =

Scientific classification
- Kingdom: Animalia
- Phylum: Mollusca
- Class: Gastropoda
- Order: Systellommatophora
- Family: Veronicellidae
- Genus: Simrothula
- Species: S. paraensis

Binomial name
- Simrothula paraensis Gomes, Picanco, Mendes & Thome, 2006

Species of gastropod

Simrothula paraensis is a species of air-breathing land slug, terrestrial pulmonate gastropod mollusk in the family Veronicellidae, the leatherleaf slugs.
