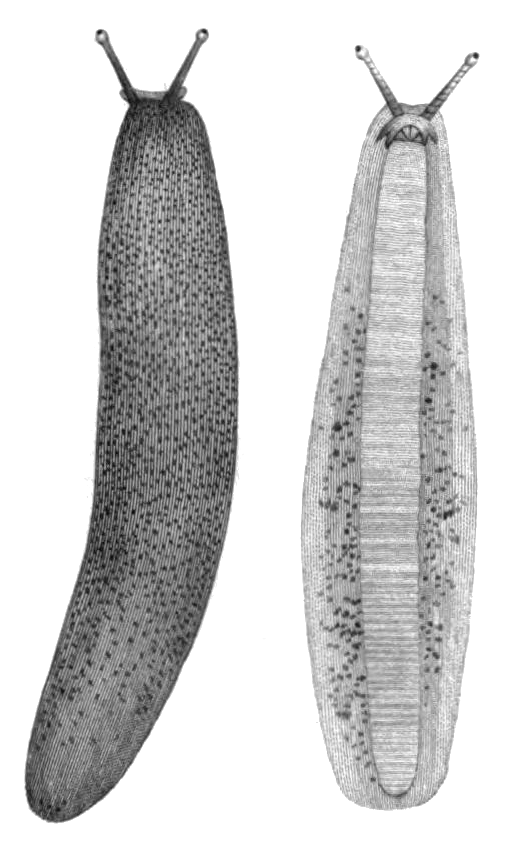
- Drawing of dorsal and ventral view of Diplosolenodes occidentalis from its original type description

Scientific classification
- Domain: Eukaryota
- Kingdom: Animalia
- Phylum: Mollusca
- Class: Gastropoda
- Order: Systellommatophora
- Family: Veronicellidae
- Genus: Diplosolenodes; Thomé, 1975

= Diplosolenodes =

Genus of land slugs

Diplosolenodes is a genus of air-breathing land slugs, terrestrial pulmonate gastropod mollusks in the family Veronicellidae, the leatherleaf slugs.

== Species ==
Species within the genus Diplosolenodes include:

- Diplosolenodes attenuatus
- Diplosolenodes occidentalis
