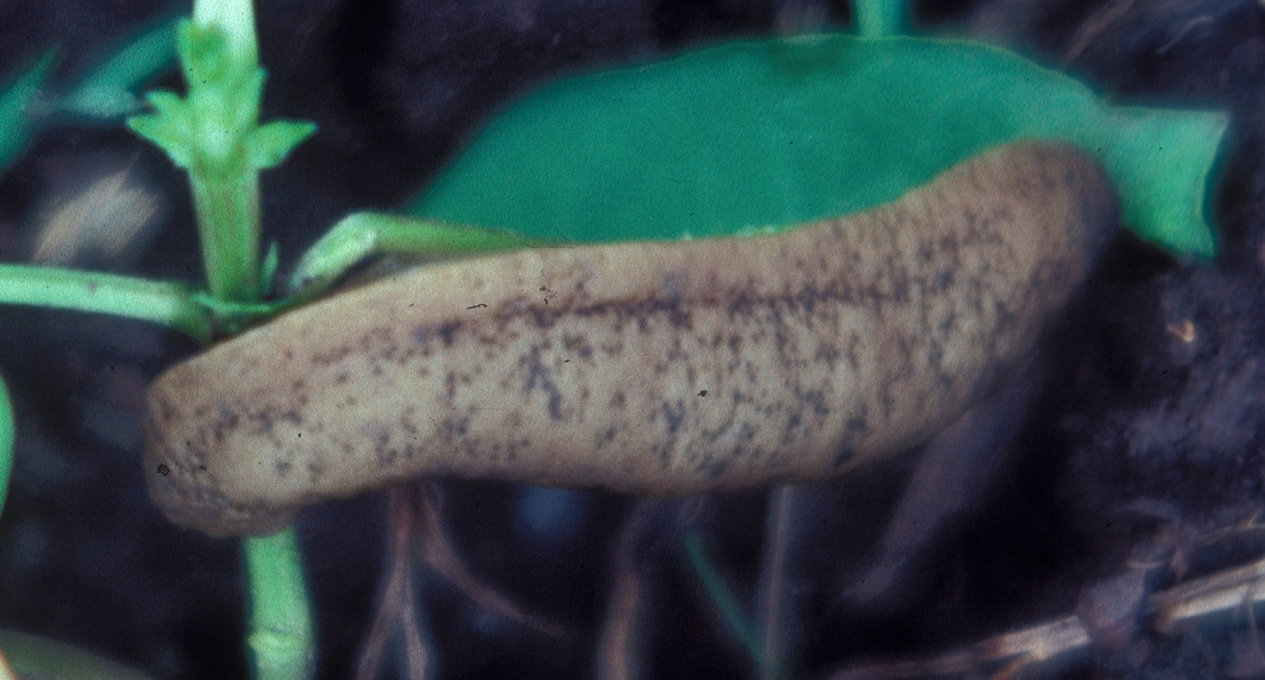
- Sarasinula plebeia

Scientific classification
- Kingdom: Animalia
- Phylum: Mollusca
- Class: Gastropoda
- Order: Systellommatophora
- Family: Veronicellidae
- Genus: Sarasinula; Grimpe & Hoffmann, 1924

= Sarasinula =

Genus of gastropods

Sarasinula is a genus of air-breathing land slugs in the family Veronicellidae, the leatherleaf slugs.

== Species ==
Species in the genus Sarasinula include:

- Sarasinula dubia (Semper, 1885)
- Sarasinula linguaeformis (Semper, 1885)
- Sarasinula marginata (Semper, 1885)
- Sarasinula plebeia (P. Fischer, 1868) – Caribbean leatherleaf
