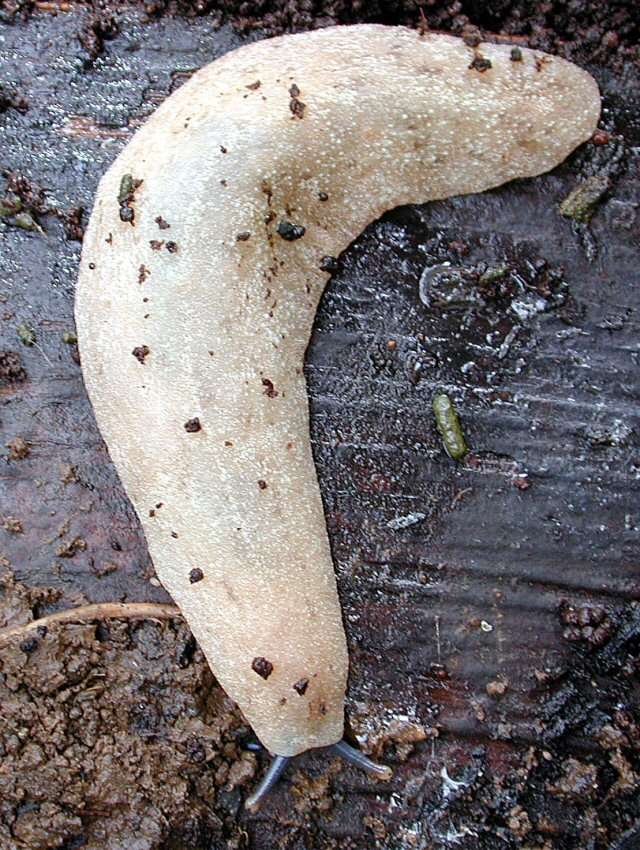
- Veronicella sloanii

Scientific classification
- Kingdom: Animalia
- Phylum: Mollusca
- Class: Gastropoda
- Order: Systellommatophora
- Family: Veronicellidae
- Genus: Veronicella; Blainville, 1817

= Veronicella =

Genus of gastropods

Veronicella is a genus of tropical air-breathing land slugs in the family Veronicellidae, the leatherleaf slugs.

Veronicella cubensis and V. sloanii are known as agricultural pests.

== Species ==
Species within the genus Veronicella include:

- Veronicella cubensis (Pfeiffer, 1840) – Cuban slug
- Veronicella portoricensis (Semper, 1886)
- Veronicella sloanii (Cuvier, 1817) (orth. var. Veronicella sloanii) – pancake slug
- Veronicella tenax Baker, 1931
- Veronicella sp. from Dominica - an as yet undescribed species

== Gallery ==
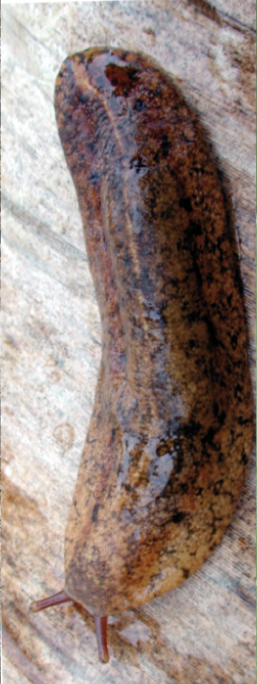
Veronicella cubensis

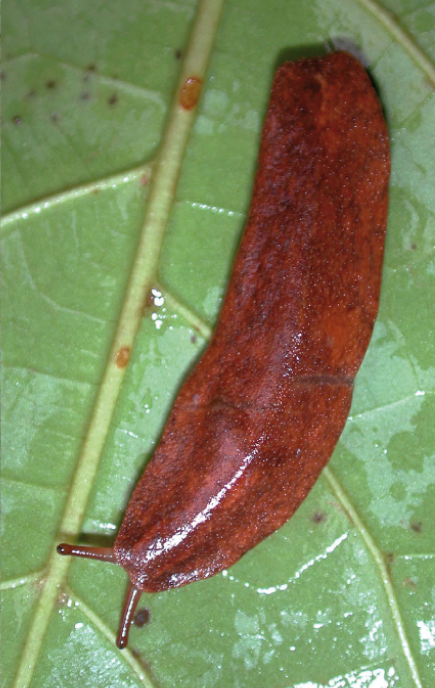
Veronicella sp. from Dominica
