= Vaginula rodericensis =

Scientific classification
- Kingdom: Animalia
- Phylum: Mollusca
- Class: Gastropoda
- Order: Systellommatophora
- Family: Veronicellidae
- Genus: Vaginula
- Species: V. rodericensis

Binomial name
- Vaginula rodericensis Smith, 1876

Species of gastropod

Vaginula rodericensis is a species of air-breathing land slug, terrestrial pulmonate gastropod mollusk in the family Veronicellidae, the leatherleaf slugs.
