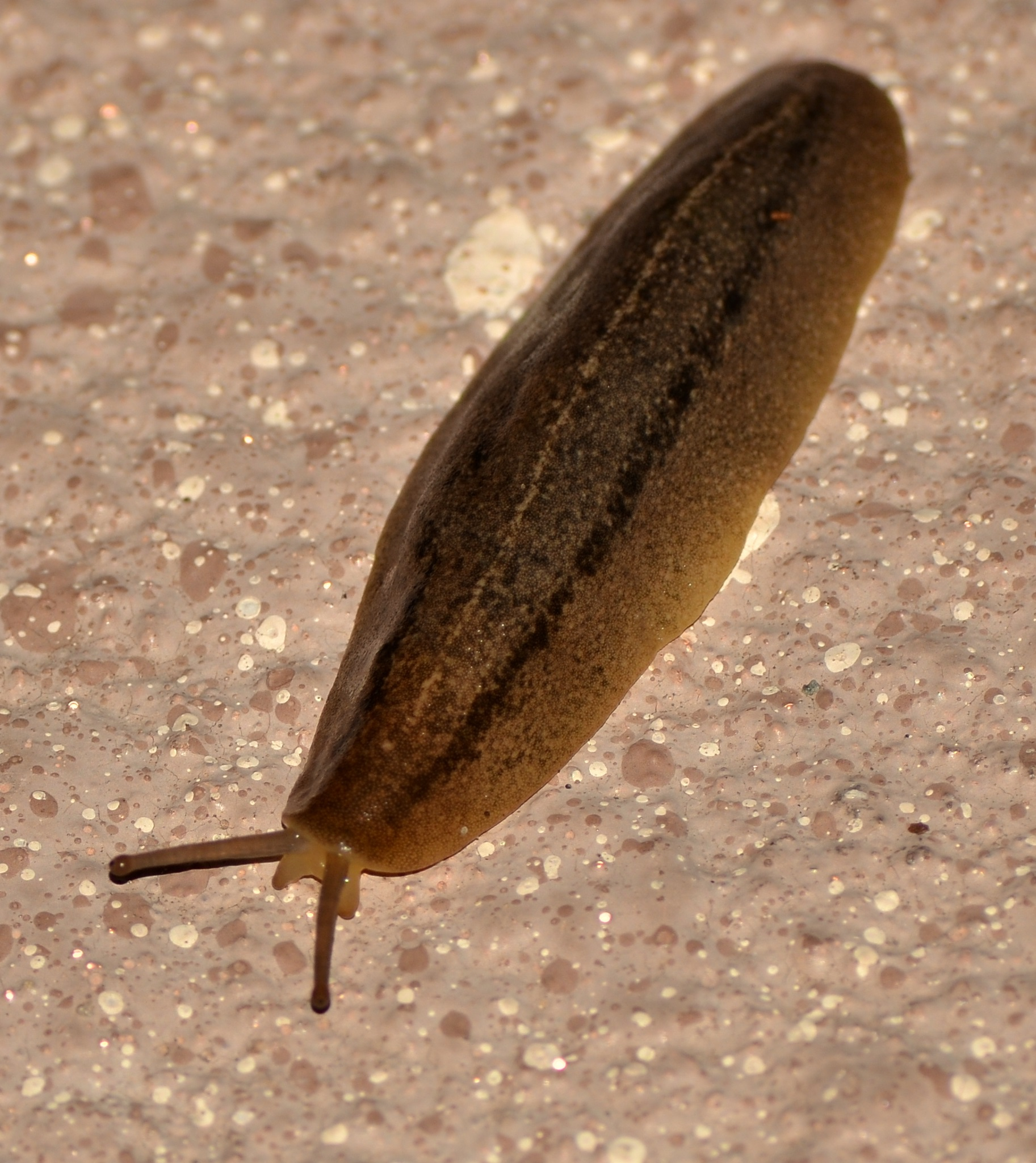
- Leidyula floridana

Scientific classification
- Kingdom: Animalia
- Phylum: Mollusca
- Class: Gastropoda
- Order: Systellommatophora
- Family: Veronicellidae
- Genus: Leidyula; H. B. Baker, 1925

= Leidyula =

Genus of gastropods

Leidyula is a genus of slugs in the family Veronicellidae, the leatherleaf slugs.

== Species ==
Species include:

- Leidyula floridana (Leidy, 1851) – Florida leatherleaf slug
- Leidyula kraussi – dappled leatherleaf
- Leidyula moreleti (Fischer, 1871) – tan leatherleaf
- Leidyula sloani – sloan leatherleaf
