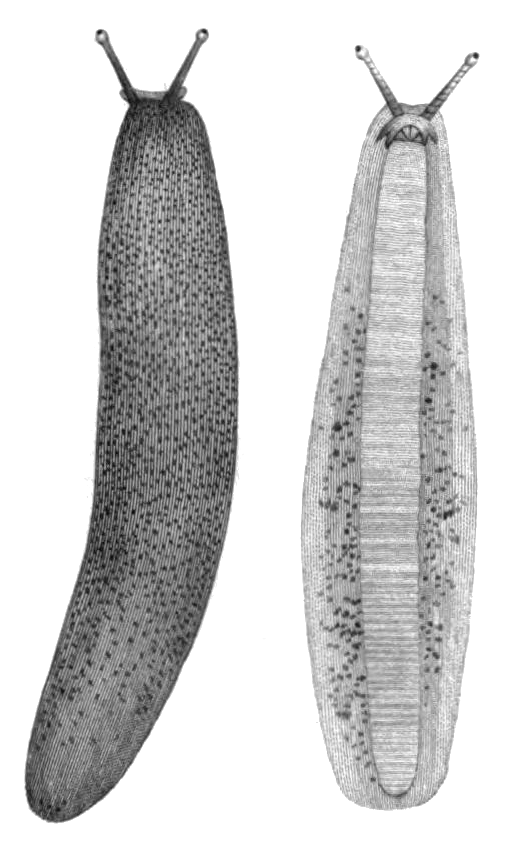
- Drawing of dorsal and ventral view of Diplosolenodes occidentalis from its original type description.
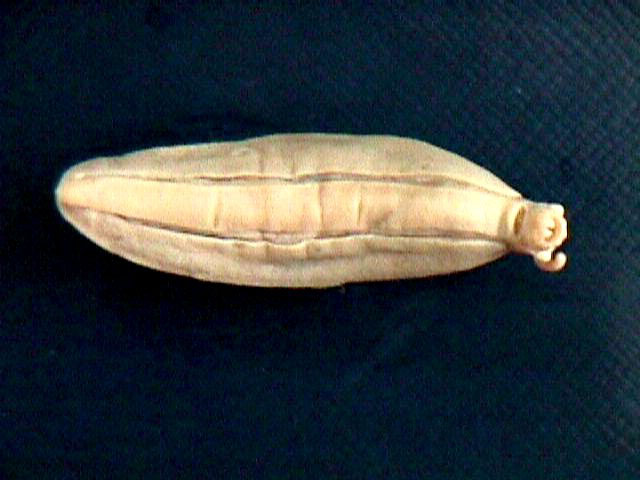
- Ventral view of a preserved specimen of Diplosolenodes occidentalis

Conservation status
- Secure (NatureServe)

Scientific classification
- Kingdom: Animalia
- Phylum: Mollusca
- Class: Gastropoda
- Order: Systellommatophora
- Family: Veronicellidae
- Genus: Diplosolenodes
- Species: D. occidentalis

Binomial name
- Diplosolenodes occidentalis (Guilding, 1825)

Synonyms
- Diploselenodes occidentalis (Guilding, 1824); Diplosolenodes nesiotis (Simroth, 1914); Latipes nesiotis (Simroth, 1914); Onchidium occidentale Guilding, 1824; Vaginula nesiotis Simroth, 1914; Vaginula occidentalis (Guilding, 1824); Vaginulus occidentalis (Guilding, 1824); Veronicella occidentalis (Guilding, 1824)

= Diplosolenodes occidentalis =

Species of land slug

Diplosolenodes occidentalis is a species of air-breathing land slug, a terrestrial pulmonate gastropod mollusk in the family Veronicellidae, the leatherleaf slugs.

== Distribution ==
Diplosolenodes occidentalis was originally discovered and described by Lansdown Guilding from the West Indian island of Saint Vincent. It seems likely that this species is native to most of the Lesser Antilles.

The distribution of Diplosolenodes occidentalis includes the Lesser Antilles:

- Dominica – first record in 1884, then in 1892

It has been introduced to the Greater Antilles, Central America and northern South America:

- Nicaragua
- Costa Rica
- In El Hatillo Miranda state – Venezuela

It occurs in greenhouses in Logan County, Oklahoma.

This species has not yet become established in the wild in the US, but it is considered to represent a potentially serious threat as a pest, an invasive species which could negatively affect agriculture, natural ecosystems, human health or commerce. Therefore, it has been suggested that this species be given top national quarantine significance in the USA.

== Description ==
This slug is most easily recognized by the black speckling on its mantle or hyponota. The body length can reach up to 60 mm.

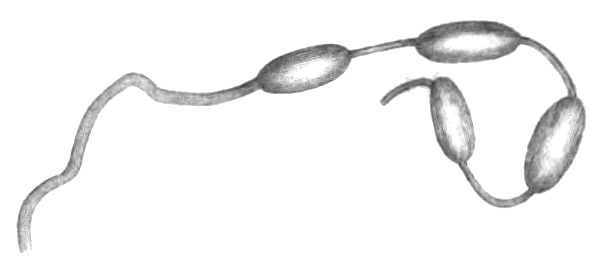
Drawing of eggs of Diplosolenodes occidentalis

== Ecology ==
This species may be found in undisturbed environments as well as in agricultural settings, where it may be regarded as a minor pest.
