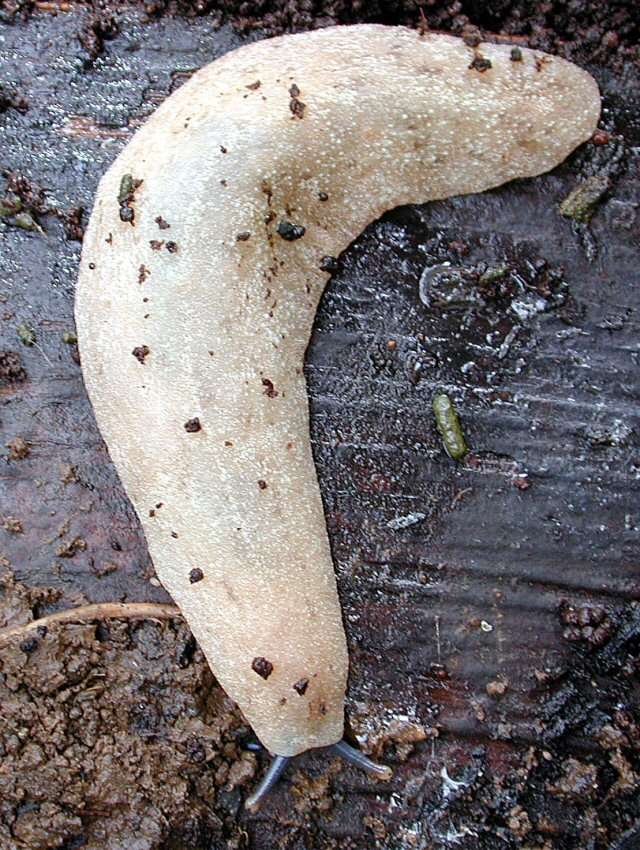
- Live individual of Veronicella sloanei
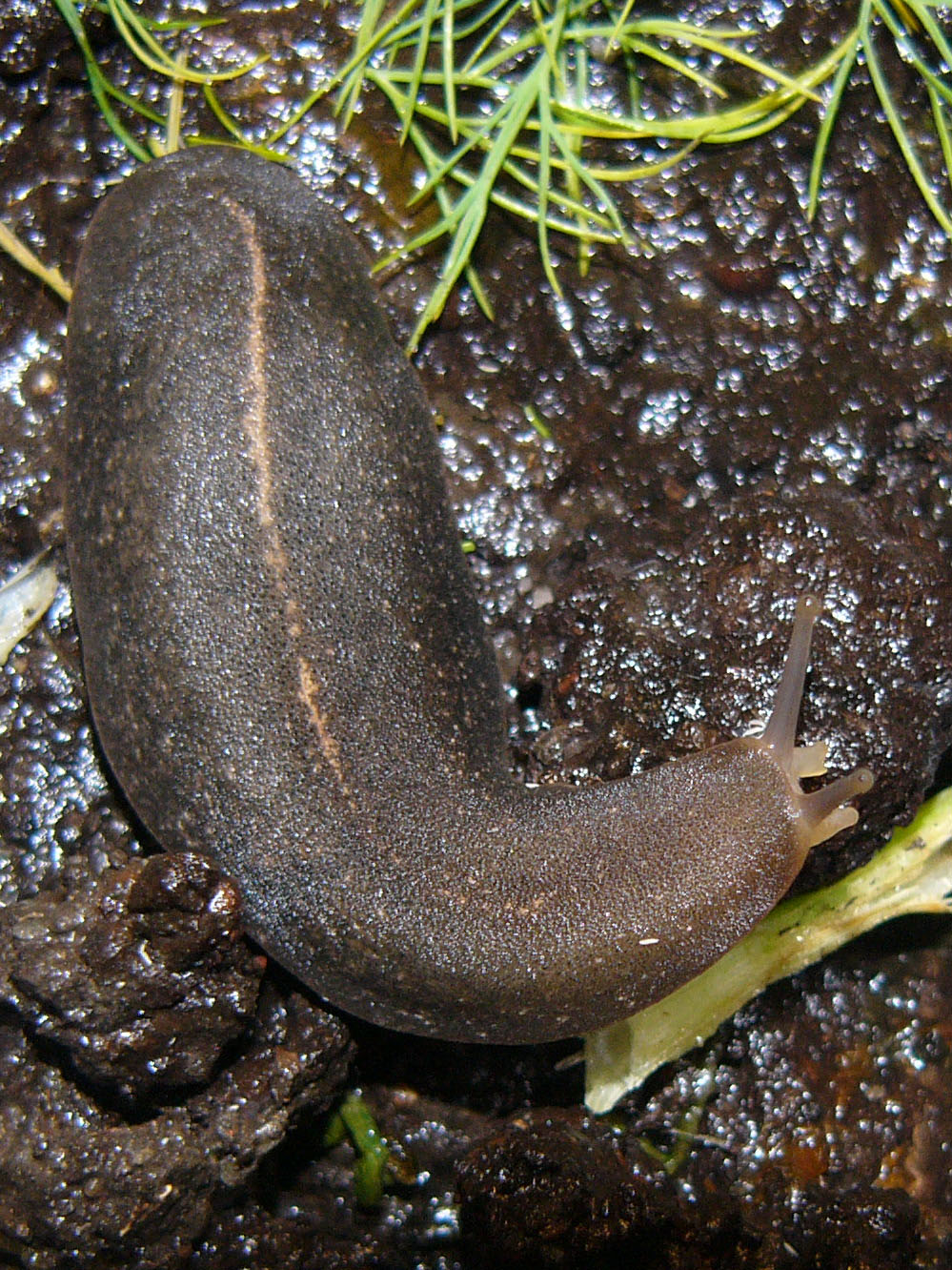
- Live individual of Laevicaulis alte

Scientific classification
- Kingdom: Animalia
- Phylum: Mollusca
- Class: Gastropoda
- Order: Systellommatophora
- Superfamily: Veronicelloidea
- Family: Veronicellidae (Gray, 1840)

Type genus
- Veronicella

Genera
- See text

Synonyms
- Vaginulidae (Martens, 1866); Meisenheimeriinae (Hoffmann, 1925); Sarasinulinae (Hoffmann, 1925); Semperulinae (Hoffmann, 1925); Imeriniinae (Hoffmann, 1928); Pseudoverocinellinae (Hoffmann, 1928)

= Veronicellidae =

Leatherleaf slugs

Family of pulmonate land slugs

The Veronicellidae, also known by their common name the leatherleaf slugs, are a family of pulmonate terrestrial slugs.

The herbivorous molluscs occur mainly in the tropical and subtropical areas of America, Asia, and Africa.

They act as intermediate hosts of the rat lung worm Angiostrongylus costaricensis, and act as a vector for other human diseases. They also cause significant damage to crops.

In April 2013, family Veronicellidae was separated into six genera of concern according to the CAPS priority pest list. These genera include: Belocaulus, Colosius, Laevicaulis, Sarasinula, Semperula, and Veronicella.

== Description ==
The dorsal surface of these slugs is entirely covered by the mantle or hyponota. These mollusks have a posterior located anus, eyes on contractile (not retractile) tentacles, and no lung or pulmonary organ. In these aspects, they are anatomically distinct from most other types of terrestrial slugs, which typically belong to the order Stylommatophora, and which have a forward located anus, and retractile tentacles.

The closely related members of the family Onchidiidae differ from the Veronicellidae by having a pulmonary sac, or lung.

== Distribution ==
Most Veronicellidae occur within their own biogeographic regions. However, some are widespread and potentially invasive, due to their facilitated movement by human activities. Drier conditions can inhibit their invasive range. However, some slugs, such as Sarasinula cubensis, have been observed to be larger and reach reproductive maturity quicker when inside their warmer, invasive range. Members of the family can be found in the Central African Republic, Kenya, Cameroon, tropical West Africa, Mexico, the Democratic Republic of the Congo, Thailand, southern Asia, southern China, Taiwan, Cuba, the Highland Rainforests of Puerto Rico, Florida, Dominica, Hawaii, the islands of the Indian Ocean, Australia, Samoa and Guyana.

== Life cycle ==
Veronicellidae produce small, translucent eggs clustered in moist soil. These slugs are known to deposit a special soil fecal material on top of their eggs to prevent desiccation of the eggs. They can lay multiple clutches during their reproductive period in the warmer months. Eggs are laid on stones, burrowed under the soil, and on decaying vegetation. In India, mating season generally occurs during the rainy season due to the moist conditions.

Based on current research, Laevicaulis egg incubation is 10–19 days, oviposition period averages 23 days, and they produce an average of 47 eggs per clutch. They can produce about 5 clutches during the reproductive period each year. Sexual maturity is reached between 53–115 days after hatching, and their lifespan is 127–188 days.

== Genera ==
The Veronicellidae family has no subfamilies (according to the taxonomy of the Gastropoda by Bouchet & Rocroi, 2005).

Genera within the family Veronicellidae include:

- Angustipes Colosi, 1922
- Belocaulus Hoffmann, 1925
- Colosius Thomé, 1975
- Diplosolenodes Thome, 1976
- Filicaulis Simroth, 1913
- Heterovaginina
- Imerinia Cockerell, 1891
- Laevicaulis Simroth, 1913
- Latipes
- Leidyula H. B. Baker, 1925
- Phyllocaulis Colosi, 1922
- Potamojanuarius Thomé, 1975
- Sarasinula Grimpe & Hoffmann, 1924
- Sarasomia
- Simrothula Thomé, 1975
  - Simrothula paraensis Gomes, Picanco, Mendes & Thome, 2006
- Vaginula Fischer, 1871
  - Vaginula rodericensis
- Vaginulus Férussac, 1829
- Veronicella de Blainville, 1817 - the type genus
