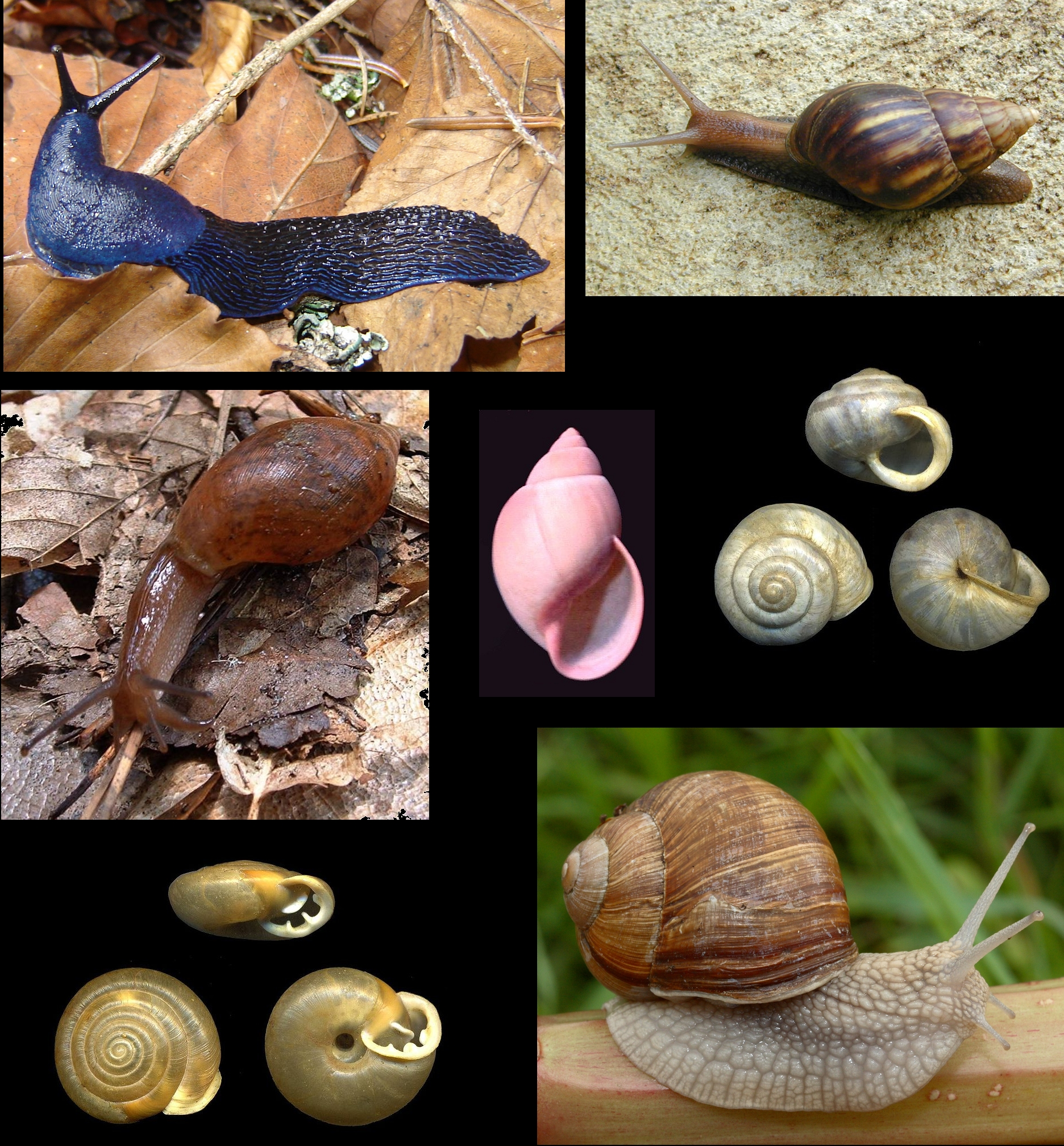
- Various examples of Sigmurethra

Scientific classification
- Kingdom: Animalia
- Phylum: Mollusca
- Class: Gastropoda
- Order: Stylommatophora
- Informal group: Sigmurethra

Superfamilies
- Acavoidea; Achatinoidea; Aillyoidea; Arionoidea; Clausilioidea; Dyakioidea; Gastrodontoidea; Helicarionoidea; Helicoidea; Limacoidea; Orthalicoidea; Papillodermatoidea; Parmacelloidea; Punctoidea; Rhytidoidea; Sagdoidea; Staffordioidea; Streptaxoidea; Testacelloidea; Zonitoidea

Synonyms
- Helicina Rafinesque, 1815

= Sigmurethra =

Sigmurethra Temporal range: Cretaceous–Recent

Informal group of gastropods

Sigmurethra is a taxonomic category of air-breathing land snails and slugs, terrestrial pulmonate gastropod molluscs. This is an informal group which includes most land snails and slugs.

The two strong synapomorphies of Sigmurethra are a long pedal gland placed beneath a membrane and retractile tentacles.

Several families in this group contain species of snails and slugs that create love darts.

Sigmurethra are known from the Cretaceous to the Recent periods.

== Taxonomy ==
=== 2005 Taxonomy ===
In the taxonomy of the Gastropoda by Bouchet & Rocroi, 2005, Sigmurethra is an "Informal Group", a subsection of the Stylommatophora. It consists of the following families:

- Superfamily Clausilioidea
  - Family Clausiliidae
  - † Family Anadromidae
  - † Family Filholiidae
  - † Family Palaeostoidae
- Superfamily Orthalicoidea
  - Family Orthalicidae
  - Family Cerionidae
  - Family Coelociontidae
  - † Family Grangerellidae
  - Family Megaspiridae
  - Family Placostylidae
  - Family Urocoptidae
- Superfamily Achatinoidea
  - Family Achatinidae
  - Family Ferussaciidae
  - Family Micractaeonidae
  - Family Subulinidae
- Superfamily Aillyoidea
  - Family Aillyidae
- Superfamily Testacelloidea
  - Family Testacellidae
  - Family Oleacinidae
  - Family Spiraxidae
- Superfamily Papillodermatoidea
  - Family Papillodermatidae
- Superfamily Streptaxoidea
  - Family Streptaxidae
- Superfamily Rhytidoidea
  - Family Rhytididae
  - Family Chlamydephoridae
  - Family Haplotrematidae
  - Family Scolodontidae
- Superfamily Acavoidea
  - Family Acavidae
  - Family Caryodidae
  - Family Dorcasiidae
  - Family Macrocyclidae
  - Family Megomphicidae
  - Family Strophocheilidae
- Superfamily Plectopyloidea
  - Family Plectopylidae
  - Family Corillidae
  - Family Sculptariidae
- Superfamily Punctoidea
  - Family Punctidae
  - † Family Anostomopsidae
  - Family Charopidae
  - Family Cystopeltidae
  - Family Discidae
  - Family Endodontidae
  - Family Helicodiscidae
  - Family Oreohelicidae
  - Family Thyrophorellidae
- Superfamily Sagdoidea
  - Family Sagdidae

==== limacoid clade ====
- Superfamily Staffordioidea
  - Family Staffordiidae
- Superfamily Dyakioidea
  - Family Dyakiidae
- Superfamily Gastrodontoidea
  - Family Gastrodontidae
  - Family Chronidae
  - Family Euconulidae
  - Family Oxychilidae
  - Family Pristilomatidae
  - Family Trochomorphidae
  - Fossil taxa probably belonging to the Gastrodontoidea
    - Subfamily † Archaeozonitinae
    - Subfamily † Grandipatulinae
    - Subfamily † Palaeoxestininae
- Superfamily Parmacelloidea
  - Family Parmacellidae
  - Family Milacidae
  - Family Trigonochlamydidae
- Superfamily Zonitoidea
  - Family Zonitidae
- Superfamily Helicarionoidea
  - Family Helicarionidae
  - Family Ariophantidae
  - Family Urocyclidae
- Superfamily Limacoidea
  - Family Limacidae
  - Family Agriolimacidae
  - Family Boettgerillidae
  - Family Vitrinidae

==== Informal group Sigmurethra continued ====
Two superfamilies belongs to clade Sigmurethra, but they are not in the limacoid clade.

- Superfamily Arionoidea
  - Family Arionidae
  - Family Anadenidae
  - Family Ariolimacidae
  - Family Binneyidae
  - Family Oopeltidae
  - Family Philomycidae
- Superfamily Helicoidea
  - Family Helicidae
  - Family Bradybaenidae
  - Family Camaenidae
  - Family Cepolidae
  - Family Cochlicellidae
  - Family Elonidae
  - Family Epiphragmophoridae
  - Family Halolimnohelicidae
  - Family Helicodontidae
  - Family Helminthoglyptidae
  - Family Humboldtianidae
  - Family Hygromiidae
  - Family Monadeniidae
  - Family Pleurodontidae
  - Family Polygyridae
  - Family Sphincterochilidae
  - Family Thysanophoridae
  - Family Trissexodontidae
  - Family Xanthonychidae

(Families that are exclusively fossil are indicated with a dagger †)

=== New families after 2005 ===
- Superfamily Streptaxoidea
  - Diapheridae - In 2010, Sutcharit et al. (2010) established a new family Diapheridae within the Streptaxoidea.

=== 2017 Taxonomy ===
After excluding groups not related, the informal group Sigmurethra becomes suborder Helicina, with the following nine infraorders and a collection of families with no superfamily：

- Suborder Helicina ("Non-Achatinoid Clade")
  - Infraorder Arionoidei
  - Infraorder Clausilioidei
  - Infraorder Helicoidei: formed from Helicoidea Rafinesque, 1815 and Sagdoidea Pilsbry, 1895
  - Infraorder Limacoidei: formed from original limacoid clade
  - Infraorder Oleacinoidei
    - Oleacinoidea: formed from original Testacelloidea but with the family Testacellidae excluded;
    - Haplotrematoidea: formed from original Rhytidoidea and Haplotrematidae
  - Infraorder Orthalicoidei
  - Infraorder Pupilloidei (Orthurethra)
  - Infraorder Rhytidoidei: formed by Rhytidoidea merging with contents from Acavoidea.
  - Infraorder Succineoidei (Elasmognatha)
