= Sea snail =

Common name for snails that normally live in saltwater

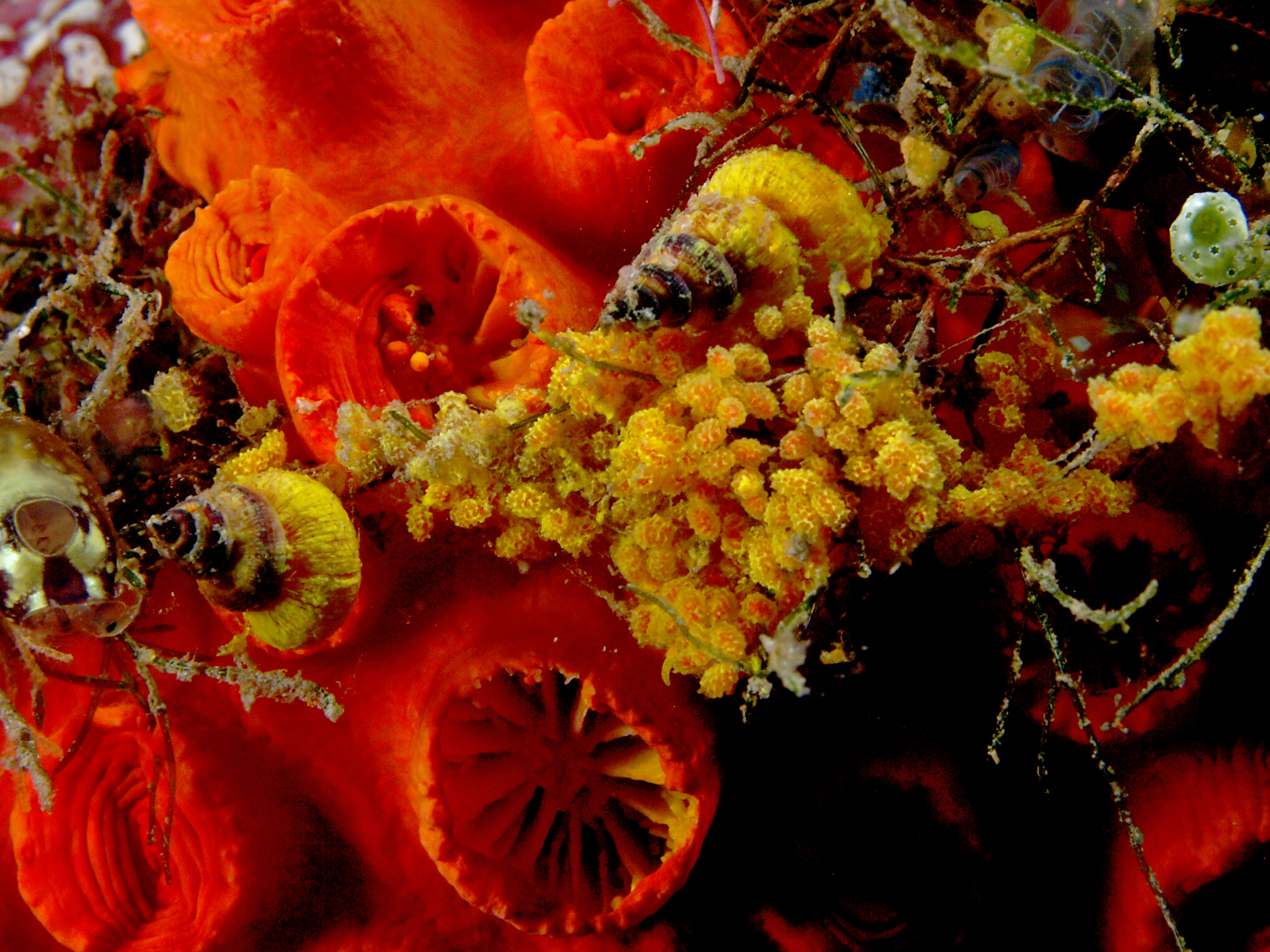
A species of sea snail in its natural habitat: two individuals of the wentletrap Epidendrium billeeanum with a mass of egg capsules in situ on their food source, a red cup coral.

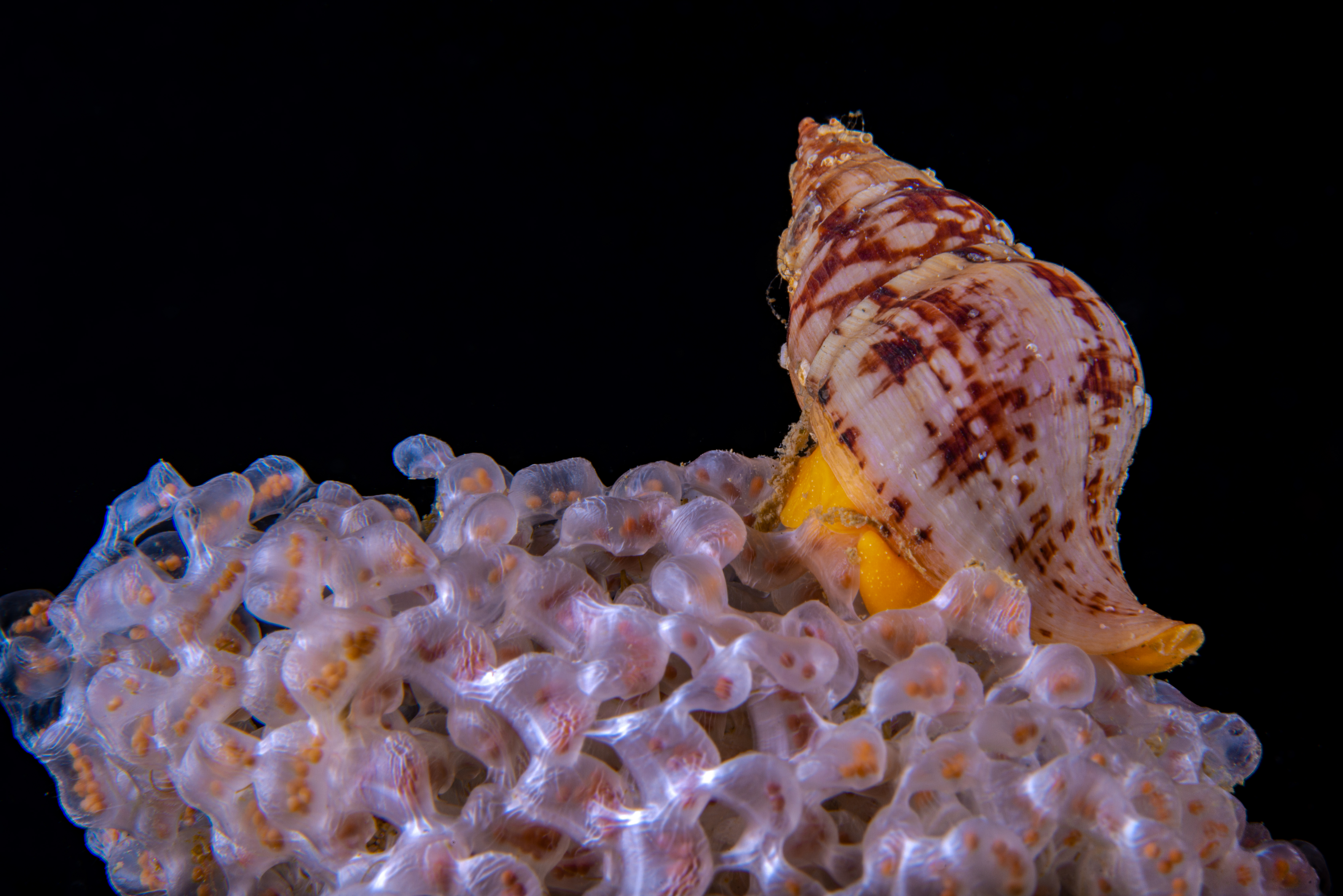
A sea snail Euthria cornea laying eggs

Sea snails are slow-moving marine gastropod molluscs, usually with visible external shells, such as whelk or abalone. They share the taxonomic class Gastropoda with land snails, and with slugs, which are distinguished from snails primarily by the absence of a visible shell.

== Definition ==
Sea snail is a common name for a diverse group of marine gastropod mollusks that typically possess a coiled shell (though some lack shells or have reduced ones), move using a muscular foot, and inhabit marine environments ranging from intertidal zones to the deep sea. Sea snails are not a single taxonomic group but include species from several gastropod clades, such as Caenogastropoda, Vetigastropoda, and Heterobranchia.

== Anatomy ==
=== Shell ===
The shells of snails are complex and grow at different speeds. The speed of growth is affected by a few variables such as the temperature of the water, depth of the water, food present for the snail, as well as isotopic oxygen levels. By looking at the composition of aragonite in the growth layers of mollusks it can be predicted the size the mollusk shell can reach. Sea snail shells are rarely planispirally coiled and are usually helicoidial, forming a spire with the protoconch preserved at its apex.

== Taxonomy ==
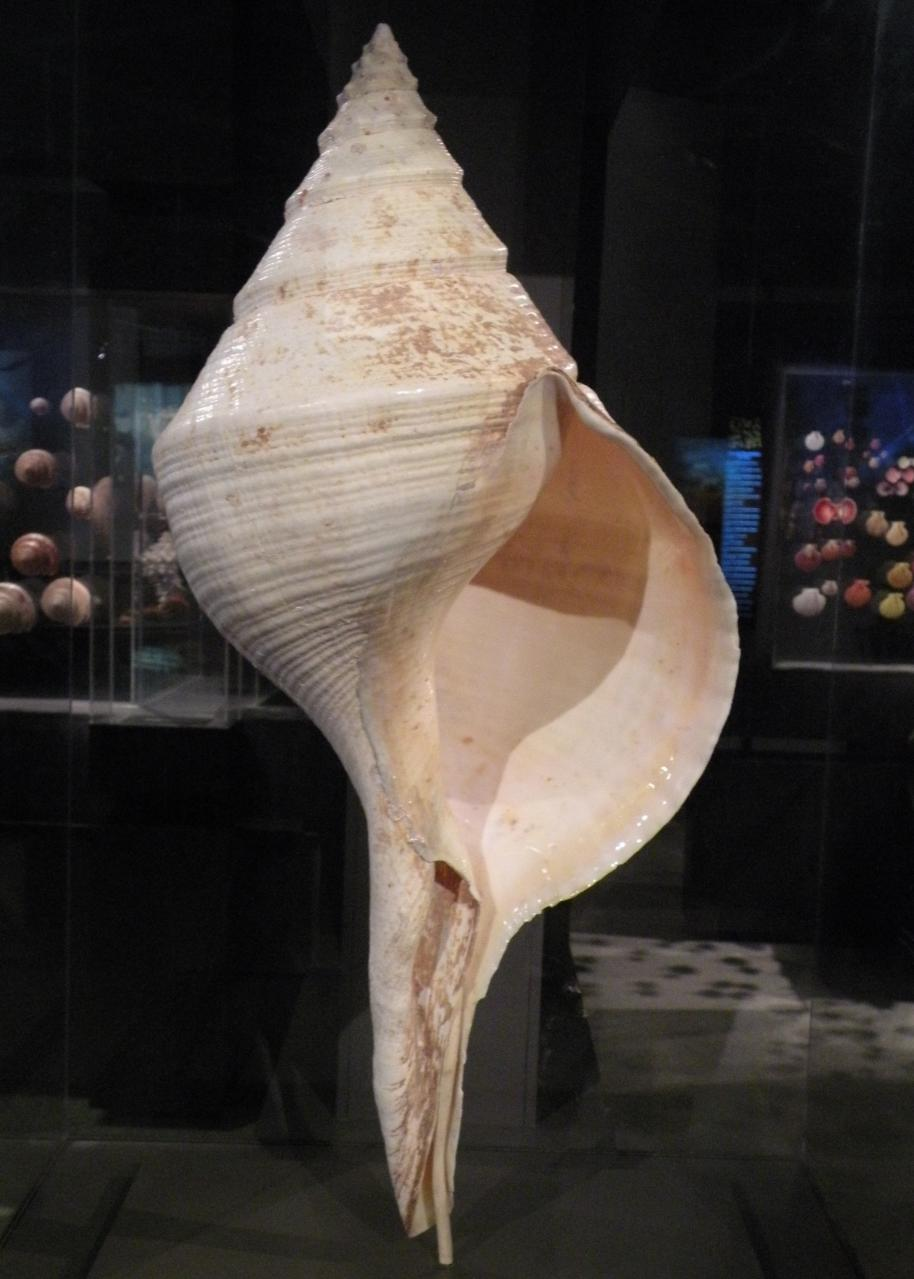
The shell of Syrinx aruanus can be up to 72 cm long.

A 50-second video of snails (most likely Natica chemnitzi and Cerithium stercusmuscaram) feeding on the sea floor in the Gulf of California, Puerto Peñasco, Mexico.

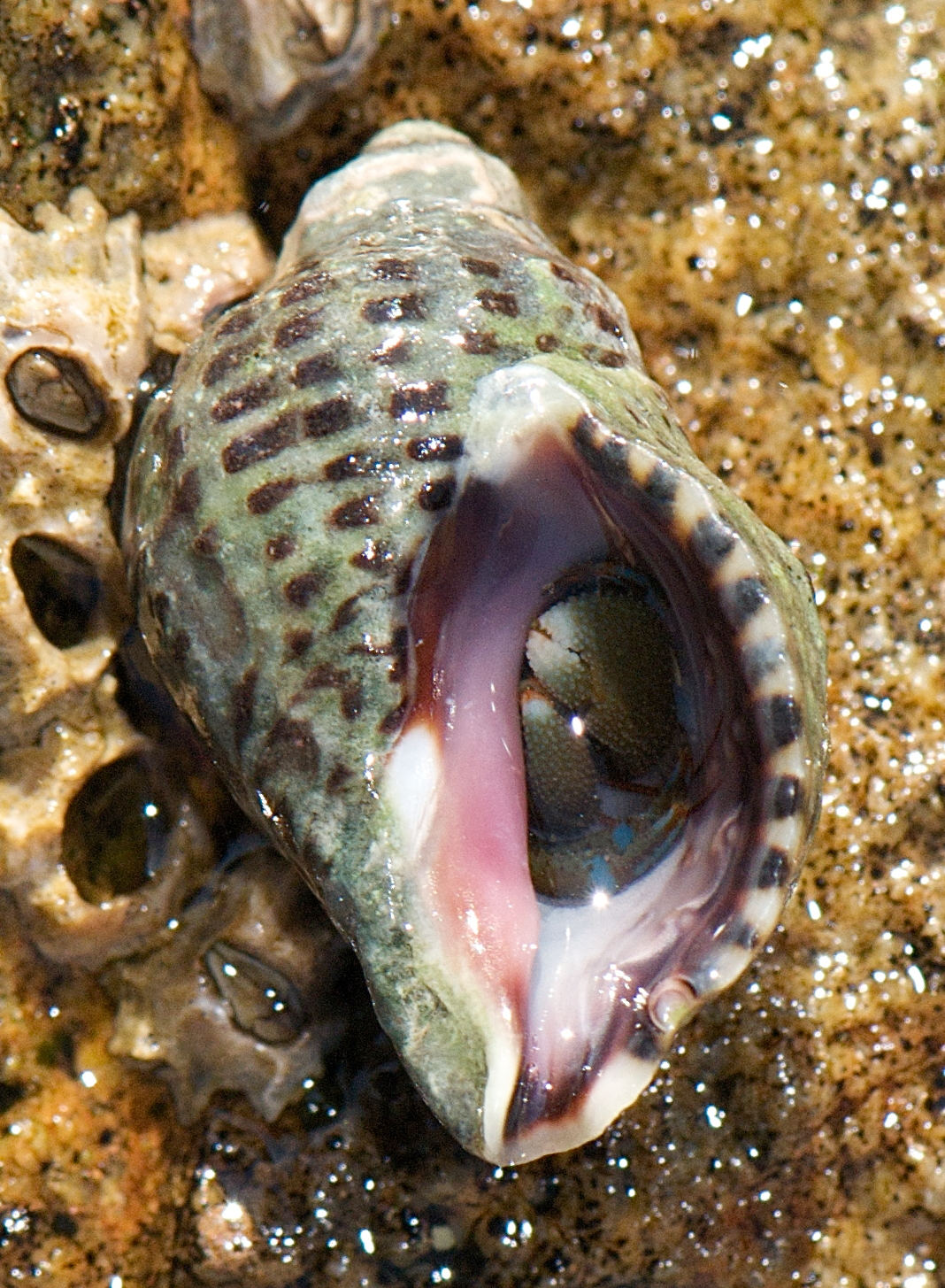
A hermit crab occupying a shell of Acanthina punctulata has been disturbed, and has retracted into the shell, using its claws to bar the entrance in the same way the snail used its operculum.

=== 2005 taxonomy ===
The following cladogram is an overview of the main clades of living gastropods based on the taxonomy of Bouchet & Rocroi (2005), with taxa that contain saltwater or brackish water species marked in boldface (some of the highlighted taxa consist entirely of marine species, but some of them also contain freshwater or land species.)

- Clade **Patellogastropoda**
- Clade **Vetigastropoda**
- Clade **Cocculiniformia**
- Clade **Neritimorpha**
  - Clade **Cycloneritimorpha**
- Clade **Caenogastropoda**
  - Informal group **Architaenioglossa**
  - Clade **Sorbeoconcha**
  - Clade **Hypsogastropoda**
    - Clade **Littorinimorpha**
    - Informal group **Ptenoglossa**
    - Clade **Neogastropoda**
- Clade **Heterobranchia**
  - Informal group **Lower Heterobranchia**
  - Informal group **Opisthobranchia**
    - Clade **Cephalaspidea**
    - Clade **Thecosomata**
    - Clade **Gymnosomata**
    - Clade **Aplysiomorpha**
    - Group **Acochlidiacea**
    - Clade **Sacoglossa**
    - Group **Cylindrobullida**
    - Clade **Umbraculida**
    - Clade **Nudipleura**
      - Clade **Pleurobranchomorpha**
      - Clade **Nudibranchia**
        - Clade **Euctenidiacea**
        - Clade **Dexiarchia**
          - Clade **Pseudoeuctenidiacea**
          - Clade **Cladobranchia**
            - Clade **Euarminida**
            - Clade **Dendronotida**
            - Clade **Aeolidida**
  - Informal group Pulmonata
    - Informal group Basommatophora
    - Clade Eupulmonata
      - Clade **Systellommatophora**
      - Clade Stylommatophora
        - Clade Elasmognatha
        - Clade Orthurethra
        - Informal group Sigmurethra

== Uses ==
=== By humans ===
Sea snails are eaten around the world and are a food source of sterols, such as cholesterol, phytosterol, and minerals, which play an important role for human health.

Due to high calcium carbonate content, sea snail shells have potential to be used as raw material in the production of lime.

=== By non-human animals ===
Sea otters, elephant seals, harbor seals, and walruses have been recorded eating sea snails. Various species of fish including but not limited to triggerfish, hogfish, and some species of pufferfish also prey on sea snails. In addition, hermit crabs use empty sea snail shells for protection.

== See also ==
- Freshwater snail
- Terrestrial molluscs
- Land snail
- Sea slug
