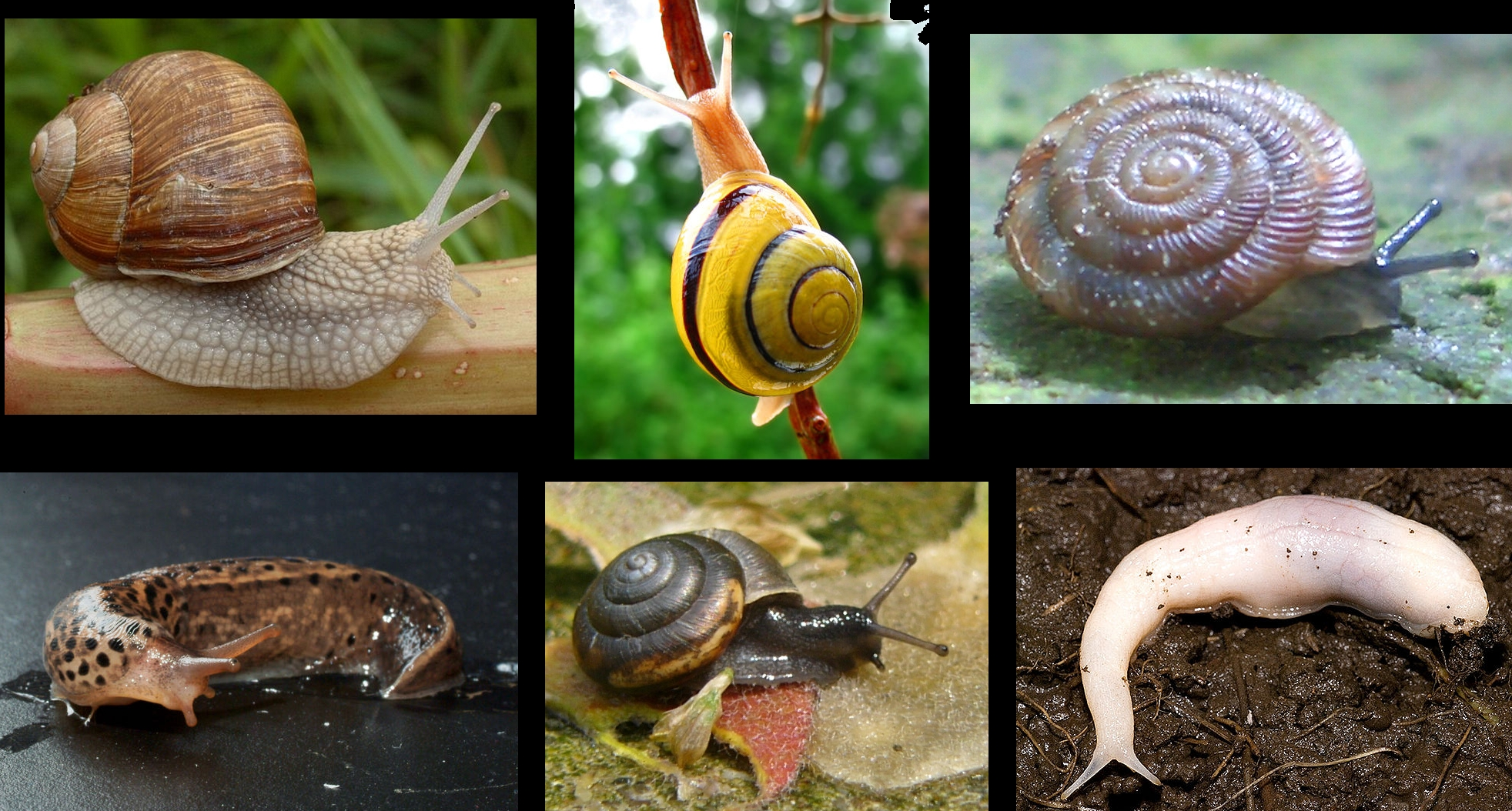
- Various examples of Pulmonata

Scientific classification
- Kingdom: Animalia
- Phylum: Mollusca
- Class: Gastropoda
- Subclass: Heterobranchia
- Informal group: Pulmonata; Cuvier, 1814

Taxonomic subdivisions
- Informal group Basommatophora; Clade Eupulmonata

= Pulmonata =

Pulmonata Temporal range: Carboniferous–recent

Informal group of gastropods

Pulmonata or pulmonates is an informal group (previously an order, and before that, a subclass) of snails and slugs characterized by the ability to breathe air, by virtue of having a pallial lung instead of a gill, or gills. The group includes many land and freshwater families, and several marine families.

The taxon Pulmonata as traditionally defined was found to be polyphyletic in a molecular study per Jörger et al., dating from 2010.

Pulmonata are known from the Carboniferous period to the present.

Pulmonates have a single atrium and kidney, and a concentrated symmetrical nervous system. The mantle cavity is on the right side of the body, and lacks gills, instead being converted into a vascularised lung. Most species have a shell, but no operculum, although the group does also include several shell-less slugs. Pulmonates are hermaphroditic, and some groups possess love darts.

== Linnean taxonomy ==
The taxonomy of this group according to the taxonomy of the Gastropoda (Ponder & Lindberg, 1997) was as follows:

Order Pulmonata Cuvier in Blainville, 1814 - pulmonates

- Suborder Systellommatophora Pilsbry, 1948
    - Superfamily Onchidioidea Rafinesque, 1815
    - Superfamily Otinoidea H. & A. Adams, 1855
    - Superfamily Rathouisioidea Sarasin, 1889
- Suborder Basommatophora Keferstein in Bronn, 1864 - freshwater pulmonates, pond snails
    - Superfamily Acroloxoidea Thiele, 1931
    - Superfamily Amphiboloidea J.E. Gray, 1840
    - Superfamily Chilinoidea H. & A. Adams, 1855
    - Superfamily Glacidorboidea Ponder, 1986
    - Superfamily Lymnaeoidea Rafinesque, 1815
    - Superfamily Planorboidea Rafinesque, 1815
    - Superfamily Siphonarioidea J.E. Gray, 1840
- Suborder Eupulmonata Haszprunar & Huber, 1990
  - Infraorder Acteophila Dall, 1885 = formerly Archaeopulmonata
    - Superfamily Melampoidea Stimpson, 1851
  - Infraorder Trimusculiformes Minichev & Starobogatov, 1975
    - Superfamily Trimusculoidea Zilch, 1959

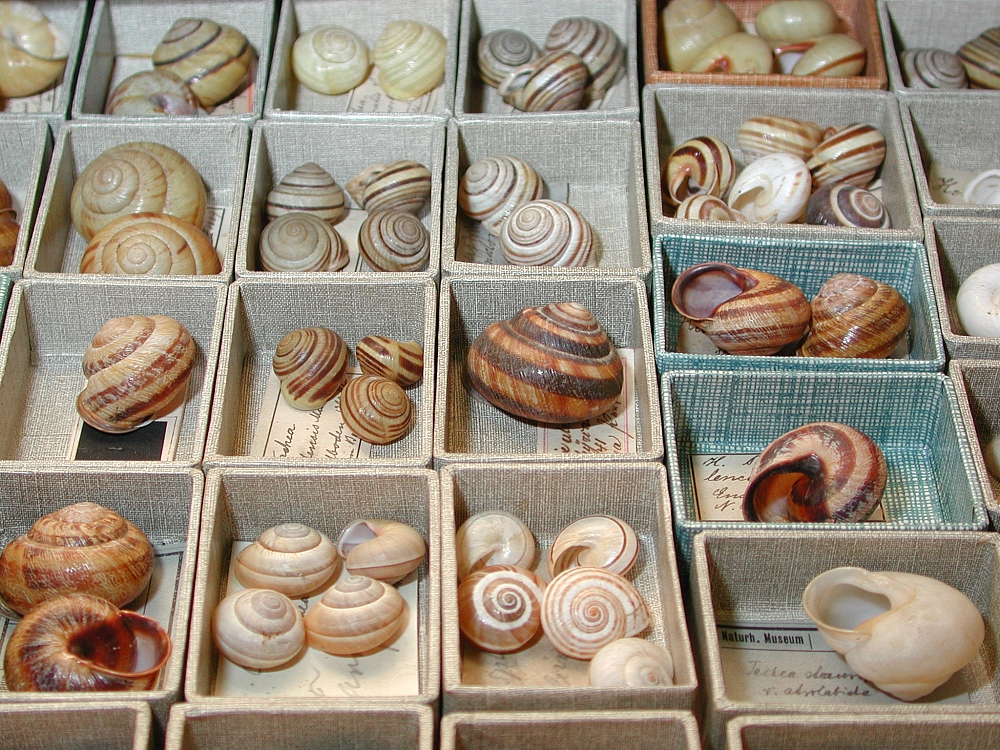
Shells of pulmonate stylommatophoran snails in a museum collection

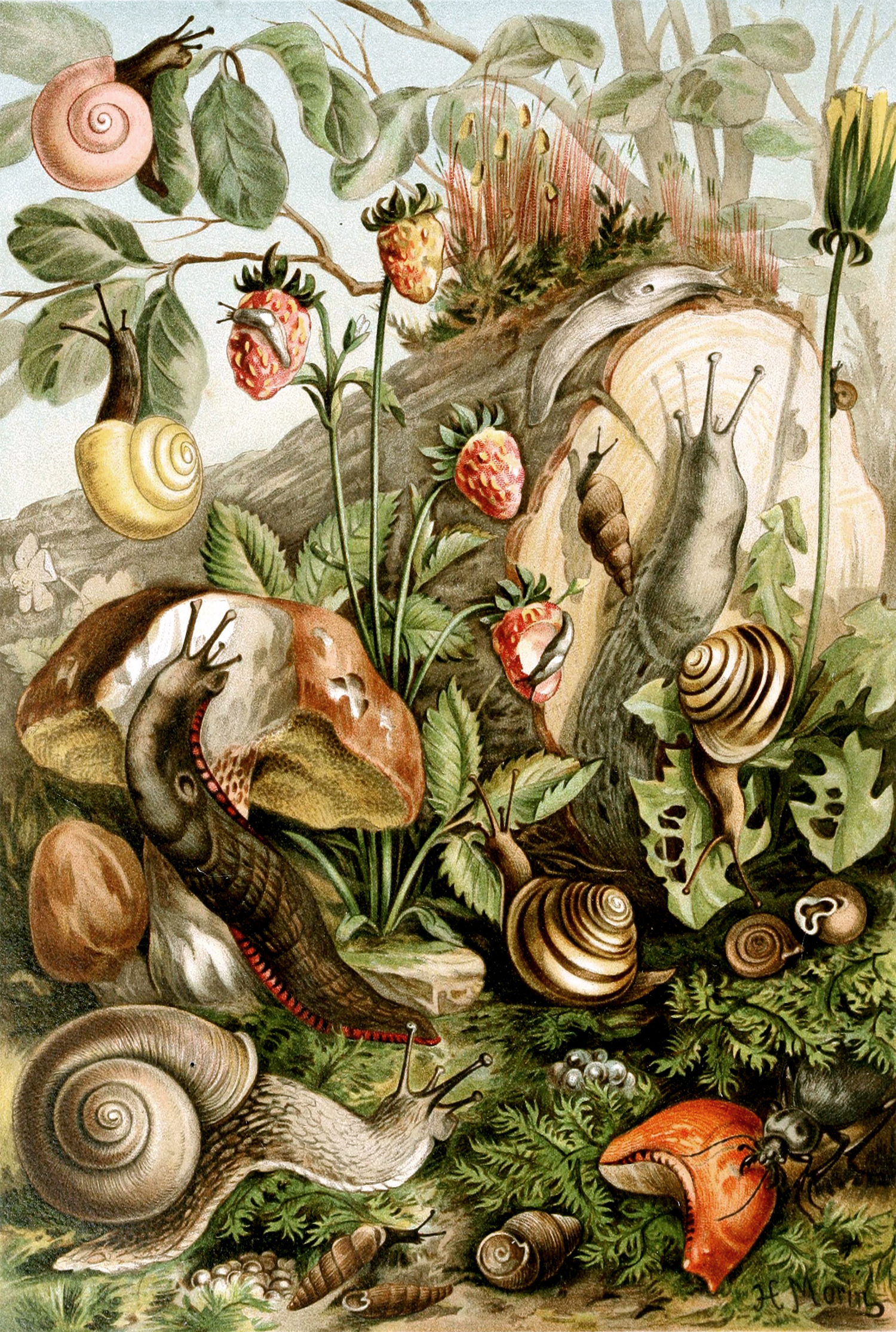
An artistic but scientifically incorrect version of various European land snails and slugs (one species here is not a pulmonate), their food plants and fungi, and a beetle that eats mollusks, bottom right.

  - Infraorder Stylommatophora A. Schmidt, 1856 – land snails and slugs
    - Subinfraorder Orthurethra
    - Superfamily Achatinelloidea Gulick, 1873
    - Superfamily Cochlicopoidea Pilsbry, 1900
    - Superfamily Partuloidea Pilsbry, 1900
    - Superfamily Pupilloidea Turton, 1831
    - Subinfraorder Sigmurethra
    - Superfamily Acavoidea Pilsbry, 1895
    - Superfamily Achatinoidea Swainson, 1840
    - Superfamily Aillyoidea Baker, 1960
    - Superfamily Arionoidea J.E. Gray in Turnton, 1840
    - Superfamily Buliminoidea Clessin, 1879
    - Superfamily Camaenoidea Pilsbry, 1895
    - Superfamily Clausilioidea Mörch, 1864
    - Superfamily Dyakioidea Gude & Woodward, 1921
    - Superfamily Gastrodontoidea Tryon, 1866
    - Superfamily Helicoidea Rafinesque, 1815
    - Superfamily Helixarionoidea Bourguignat, 1877
    - Superfamily Limacoidea Rafinesque, 1815
    - Superfamily Oleacinoidea H. & A. Adams, 1855
    - Superfamily Orthalicoidea Albers-Martens, 1860
    - Superfamily Plectopylidoidea Moellendorf, 1900
    - Superfamily Polygyroidea Pilsbry, 1894
    - Superfamily Punctoidea Morse, 1864
    - Superfamily Rhytidoidea Pilsbry, 1893
    - Superfamily Sagdidoidera Pilsbry, 1895
    - Superfamily Staffordioidea Thiele, 1931
    - Superfamily Streptaxoidea J.E. Gray, 1806
    - Superfamily Strophocheiloidea Thiele, 1926
    - Superfamily Trigonochlamydoidea Hese, 1882
    - Superfamily Zonitoidea Mörch, 1864
    - ? Superfamily Athoracophoroidea P. Fischer, 1883 = Tracheopulmonata
    - ? Superfamily Succineoidea Beck, 1837 = Heterurethra

== 2005 taxonomy ==
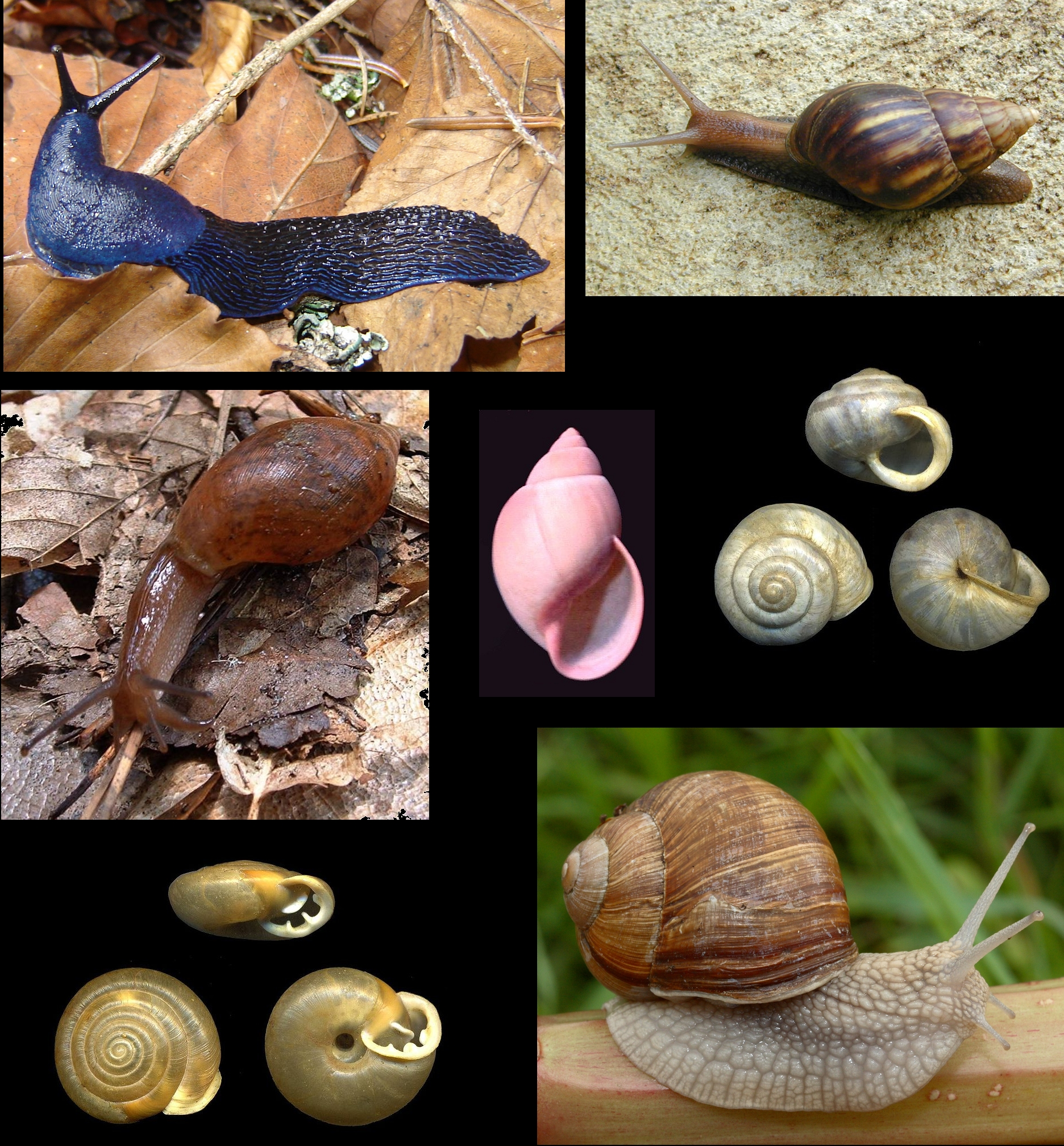
Examples of Pulmonata: Achatina fulica top right, Bielzia coerulans top left, Praticolella berlandieriana center right, Megalobulimus oblongus in the center, Euglandina rosea center left, Helix pomatia bottom right & Ashmunella levettei bottom left

The taxonomy of this group according to the taxonomy of the Gastropoda (Bouchet & Rocroi, 2005) was as follows:

=== Informal Group Pulmonata ===
Contains the informal group Basommatophora and the clade Eupulmonata

==== Informal Group Basommatophora ====
Contains the clade Hygrophila

- Superfamily Amphiboloidea
  - Family Amphibolidae
- Superfamily Siphonarioidea
  - Family Siphonariidae
  - † Family Acroreiidae

===== Clade Hygrophila =====
- Superfamily Chilinoidea
  - Family Chilinidae
  - Family Latiidae
- Superfamily Acroloxoidea
  - Family Acroloxidae
- Superfamily Lymnaeoidea
  - Family Lymnaeidae
- Superfamily Planorboidea
  - Family Planorbidae
  - Family Physidae

==== Clade Eupulmonata ====
Contains the clades Systellommatophora and Stylommatophora

- Superfamily Trimusculoidea
  - Family Trimusculidae
- Superfamily Otinoidea
  - Family Otinidae
  - Family Smeagolidae
- Superfamily Ellobioidea
  - Family Ellobiidae

===== Clade Systellommatophora ( = Gymnomorpha) =====
- Superfamily Onchidioidea
  - Family Onchidiidae
- Superfamily Veronicelloidea
  - Family Veronicellidae
  - Family Rathouisiidae

===== Clade Stylommatophora =====
Contains the subclades Elasmognatha, Orthurethra and the informal group Sigmurethra

===== Subclade Elasmognatha =====
- Superfamily Succineoidea
  - Family Succineidae
- Superfamily Athoracophoroidea
  - Family Athoracophoridae

===== Subclade Orthurethra =====
- Superfamily Partuloidea
  - Family Partulidae
  - Family Draparnaudiidae
- Superfamily Achatinelloidea
  - Family Achatinellidae
- Superfamily Cochlicopoidea
  - Family Cochlicopidae
  - Family Amastridae
- Superfamily Pupilloidea
  - Family Pupillidae
  - Family Argnidae
  - Family Chondrinidae
  - † Family Cylindrellinidae
  - Family Lauriidae
  - Family Orculidae
  - Family Pleurodiscidae
  - Family Pyramidulidae
  - Family Spelaeodiscidae
  - Family Strobilopsidae
  - Family Valloniidae
  - Family Vertiginidae
- Superfamily Enoidea
  - Family Enidae
  - Family Cerastidae

===== Informal Group Sigmurethra =====
- Superfamily Clausilioidea
  - Family Clausiliidae
  - † Family Anadromidae
  - † Family Filholiidae
  - † Family Palaeostoidae
- Superfamily Orthalicoidea
  - Family Orthalicidae
  - Family Cerionidae
  - Family Coelociontidae
  - † Family Grangerellidae
  - Family Megaspiridae
  - Family Placostylidae
  - Family Urocoptidae
- Superfamily Achatinoidea
  - Family Achatinidae
  - Family Ferussaciidae
  - Family Micractaeonidae
  - Family Subulinidae
- Superfamily Aillyoidea
  - Family Aillyidae
- Superfamily Testacelloidea
  - Family Testacellidae
  - Family Oleacinidae
  - Family Spiraxidae
- Superfamily Papillodermatoidea
  - Family Papillodermatidae
- Superfamily Streptaxoidea
  - Family Streptaxidae
- Superfamily Rhytidoidea
  - Family Rhytididae
  - Family Chlamydephoridae
  - Family Haplotrematidae
  - Family Scolodontidae
- Superfamily Acavoidea
  - Family Acavidae
  - Family Caryodidae
  - Family Dorcasiidae
  - Family Macrocyclidae
  - Family Megomphicidae
  - Family Strophocheilidae
- Superfamily Punctoidea
  - Family Punctidae
  - † Family Anostomopsidae
  - Family Charopidae
  - Family Cystopeltidae
  - Family Discidae
  - Family Endodontidae
  - Family Helicodiscidae
  - Family Oreohelicidae
  - Family Thyrophorellidae
- Superfamily Sagdoidea
  - Family Sagdidae

===== limacoid clade =====
- Superfamily Staffordioidea
  - Family Staffordiidae
- Superfamily Dyakioidea
  - Family Dyakiidae
- Superfamily Gastrodontoidea
  - Family Gastrodontidae
  - Family Chronidae
  - Family Euconulidae
  - Family Oxychilidae
  - Family Pristilomatidae
  - Family Trochomorphidae
  - Fossil taxa probably belonging to the Gastrodontoidea
    - Subfamily † Archaeozonitinae
    - Subfamily † Grandipatulinae
    - Subfamily † Palaeoxestininae
- Superfamily Parmacelloidea
  - Family Parmacellidae
  - Family Milacidae
  - Family Trigonochlamydidae
- Superfamily Zonitoidea
  - Family Zonitidae
- Superfamily Helicarionoidea
  - Family Helicarionidae
  - Family Ariophantidae
  - Family Urocyclidae
- Superfamily Limacoidea
  - Family Limacidae
  - Family Agriolimacidae
  - Family Boettgerillidae
  - Family Vitrinidae

===== other Sigmurethra =====
Two superfamilies belongs to clade Sigmurethra, but they are not in the limacoid clade.

- Superfamily Arionoidea
  - Family Arionidae
  - Family Anadenidae
  - Family Ariolimacidae
  - Family Binneyidae
  - Family Oopeltidae
  - Family Philomycidae
- Superfamily Helicoidea
  - Family Helicidae
  - Family Bradybaenidae
  - Family Camaenidae
  - Family Cepolidae
  - Family Cochlicellidae
  - Family Elonidae
  - Family Epiphragmophoridae
  - Family Halolimnohelicidae
  - Family Helicodontidae
  - Family Helminthoglyptidae
  - Family Humboldtianidae
  - Family Hygromiidae
  - Family Monadeniidae
  - Family Pleurodontidae
  - Family Polygyridae
  - Family Sphincterochilidae
  - Family Thysanophoridae
  - Family Trissexodontidae
  - Family Xanthonychidae

== 2010 taxonomy ==
Jörger et al. (2010) analyzed major groups within the Heterobranchia using genetic data and found that Pulmonata as traditionally defined was polyphyletic, for instance some pulmonates were more closely related to Sacoglossa and Acochlidia. They proposed the more inclusive taxon Panpulmonata to unite the clades Siphonarioidea, Sacoglossa, Glacidorboidea, Pyramidelloidea, Amphiboloidea, Hygrophila, Acochlidia and Eupulmonata.
