= Macrocyclis =

- M. peruvianus

Scientific classification
- Kingdom: Animalia
- Phylum: Mollusca
- Class: Gastropoda
- Order: Stylommatophora
- Informal group: Sigmurethra
- Family: Macrocyclidae
- Genus: Macrocyclis; Beck, 1837

Species
- Macrocyclis peruvianus (Lamarck, 1822)

Genus of gastropods

Macrocyclis is a monotypic genus of large air-breathing land snails, terrestrial pulmonate gastropod mollusks in the family Macrocyclidae. The single living species in this genus is Macrocyclis peruvianus (Lamarck, 1822).

== Distribution ==
Macrocyclis peruvianus is endemic to Chile and adjacent parts of Argentina. In Chile this is the largest species of land snail and is found from the O'Higgins Region in the north to the Aysén Region in the south. It is more abundant in native forests of the coastal range of the Andean foothills, especially in Nothophagus, evergreen and mixed forests. However, it can also occur in plantations, sclerophyllous and hygrophyllous forests.

== Description ==
Showing size

Macrocylis peruvianus is a large snail with a shiny black body and a reddish-brown shell formed by a depressed, short spire with up to 60 mm in diameter formed by 4.5 to 5 whorls that rapidly increase in size. The aperture is ovate and its lip is overturned and widened at the bottom.

== Ecology ==
In its native range, M. peruvianus inhabits the leaf litter in areas rich in ferns, mosses, decaying wood and with a strong understory. Its diet is still poorly known, but it is known to include several mushroom species and other snails. One of its main predators is the land planarian Polycladus gayi.
