= Cylindrellinidae =

Scientific classification
- Kingdom: Animalia
- Phylum: Mollusca
- Class: Gastropoda
- Order: Stylommatophora
- Family: †Cylindrellinidae; Zilch, 1959

Extinct family of gastropods

†Cylindrellinidae is an extinct family of air-breathing land snails, terrestrial pulmonate gastropod mollusks.

== Taxonomy ==
The family Cylindrellinidae is classified within the informal group Orthurethra, itself belonging to the clade Stylommatophora within the clade Eupulmonata (according to the taxonomy of the Gastropoda by Bouchet & Rocroi, 2005).

== Genera ==
- † Cylindrellina Munier-Chalmas, 1884
- †Fascinella Stache, 1871
- † Paradistoechia Cossmann, 1924

Synonyms

† Distoechia Crosse, 1890 : synonym of † Cylindrellina Munier-Chalmas, 1884 (junior subjective synonym)
