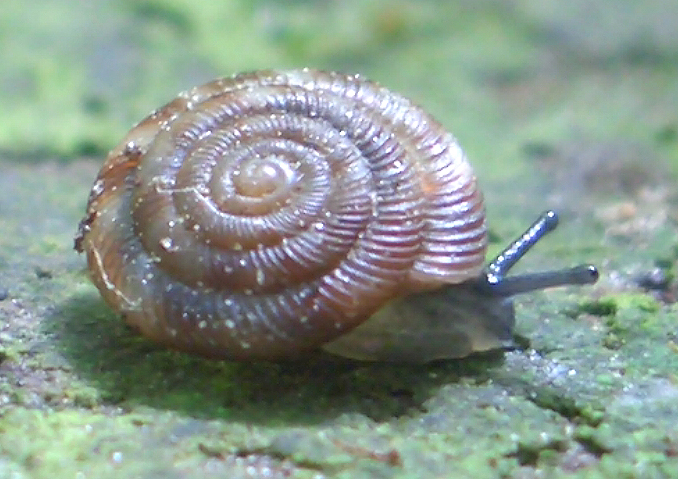
- A live individual of Discus rotundatus in the family Discidae

Scientific classification
- Kingdom: Animalia
- Phylum: Mollusca
- Class: Gastropoda
- Order: Stylommatophora
- Suborder: Helicina
- Infraorder: incertae sedis
- Superfamily: Punctoidea; Morse, 1864

Families
- According to the taxonomy of the Gastropoda (Bouchet & Rocroi, 2005): Punctidae; Charopidae; Cystopeltidae; Discidae; Endodontidae; Helicodiscidae; Oreohelicidae

= Punctoidea =

Superfamily of gastropods

Punctoidea is a superfamily of air-breathing land snails and slugs, terrestrial pulmonate gastropod mollusks in the informal group Sigmurethra.

== Taxonomy ==
The superfamily Punctoidea is classified within the clade Stylommatophora within the clade Eupulmonata. As of 2017, it contains the following families:

- † Afrodontops Kadolsky, 2020
- Charopidae Hutton, 1884
- Cystopeltidae Cockerell, 1891
- Discidae Thiele, 1931 (1866)
- Endodontidae Pilsbry, 1895
- Helicodiscidae Pilsbry, 1927
- Oopeltidae Cockerell, 1891
- Oreohelicidae Pilsbry, 1939
- Punctidae Morse, 1864
