= Anadromidae =

Scientific classification
- Kingdom: Animalia
- Phylum: Mollusca
- Class: Gastropoda
- Order: Stylommatophora
- Superfamily: Clausilioidea
- Family: †Anadromidae

Genera
- See text.

Extinct family of gastropods

Anadromidae is an extinct family of gastropods in the clade Eupulmonata (according to taxonomy of the Gastropoda by Bouchet & Rocroi, 2005).

== Taxonomy ==
The family Anadromidae is classified within the informal group Sigmurethra, itself belonging to the clade Stylommatophora within the clade Eupulmonata (according to taxonomy of the Gastropoda by Bouchet & Rocroi, 2005).

The family Anadromidae consists of the following subfamilies:

== Genera ==
Anadromus

Lychnus

Nicolasia
