= Aillya =

Scientific classification
- Kingdom: Animalia
- Phylum: Mollusca
- Class: Gastropoda
- Order: Stylommatophora
- Suborder: Achatinina
- Superfamily: Achatinoidea
- Family: Aillyidae; H. B. Baker, 1955
- Genus: Aillya; Odhner, 1927

Genus of gastropods

Aillyidae is a family of air-breathing land snails, terrestrial pulmonate gastropod molluscs in the order Stylommatophora. The only genus in the family is Aillya.

The family and the genus is named in honor of Swedish malacologist Adolf d'Ailly (1855–1927).

== Taxonomy ==
The family Aillyidae is classified within the informal group Sigmurethra, itself belonging to the clade Stylommatophora within the clade Eupulmonata (according to taxonomy of the Gastropoda by Bouchet & Rocroi, 2005). This family has no subfamilies.

Aillyidae has been treated as the only family in the superfamily Aillyoidea.

Prestonellidae has been tentatively placed as a synonym of Aillyidae in the taxonomy of the Gastropoda by Bouchet & Rocroi, 2005. Herbert & Mitchell (2009) have moved Prestonellidae to the superfamily Orthalicoidea.

== Species ==
Species accepted by the World Register of Marine Species as of July 2026.

- Aillya camerunensis Odhner, 1927 - it lives in Africa
- Aillya totipunctata Connolly, 1929
