= Coelociontidae =

Scientific classification
- Kingdom: Animalia
- Phylum: Mollusca
- Class: Gastropoda
- Order: Stylommatophora
- Superfamily: Orthalicoidea
- Family: Coelociontidae; Iredale, 1937

Synonyms
- Perrieriinae Schileyko, 1999

Family of gastropods

Coelociontidae is a family of air-breathing land snails, terrestrial pulmonate gastropod mollusks in the clade Eupulmonata (according to the taxonomy of the Gastropoda by Bouchet & Rocroi, 2005).

This family has no subfamilies.

== Genera ==
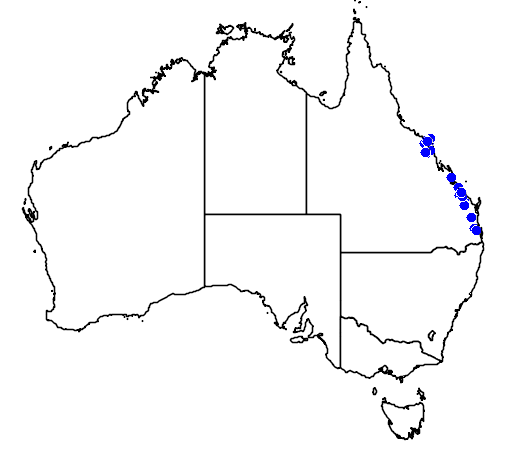
Distribution map of Coelocion australis

Genera within the family Coelociontidae include:

- Coelocion Pilsbry, 1904 - type genus of the family Coelociontidae
  - Coelocion australis Forbes
- Perrieria Tapparone Canefri, 1878
  - Perrieria clausiliaeformis Tapparone Canefri, 1878
