= Sagdoidea =

Scientific classification
- Kingdom: Animalia
- Phylum: Mollusca
- Class: Gastropoda
- Superorder: Eupulmonata
- Order: Stylommatophora
- Suborder: Helicina
- Superfamily: Sagdoidea; Pilsbry, 1895

Superfamily of gastropods

Sagdoidea is a superfamily of air-breathing land snails, terrestrial pulmonate gastropod mollusks in the infraorder Helicoidei of the suborder Helicina.

== Families ==
- Sagdidae Pilsbry, 1895
- Solaropsidae H. Nordsieck, 1986
- Zachrysiidae D. G. Robinson, Sei & Rosenberg, 2017
