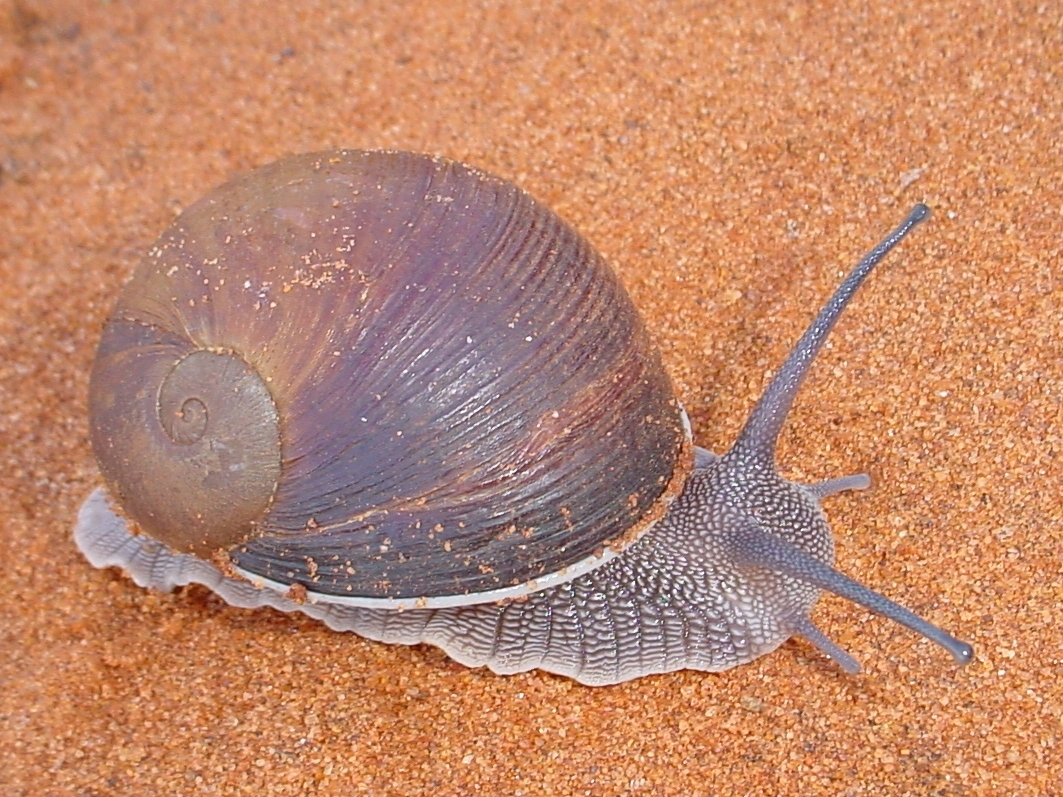
- A live individual of Helicophanta gloriosa, family Acavidae

Scientific classification
- Kingdom: Animalia
- Phylum: Mollusca
- Class: Gastropoda
- Order: Stylommatophora
- Informal group: Sigmurethra
- Superfamily: Acavoidea; Pilsbry, 1895

Families
- See text

= Acavoidea =

Superfamily of gastropods

The Acavoidea are a taxonomic superfamily of air-breathing land snails and slugs, terrestrial pulmonate gastropod mollusks in the informal group Sigmurethra.

This taxonomy was based on the study by Nordsieck, published in 1986.

== Taxonomy ==
Families within the superfamily Acavoidea are as follows:

- Family Acavidae Pilsbry, 1895
- Family Caryodidae Conolly, 1915
- Family Dorcasiidae Conolly, 1915
- Family Macrocyclidae Thiele, 1926
- Family Megomphicidae H.B. Baker, 1930
- Family Strophocheilidae Pilsbry, 1902
