= Papilloderma =

Conservation status
- Vulnerable (IUCN 3.1)

Scientific classification
- Kingdom: Animalia
- Phylum: Mollusca
- Class: Gastropoda
- Order: Stylommatophora
- Suborder: Helicina
- Infraorder: incertae sedis
- Superfamily: Papillodermatoidea; Wikton, Martin & Castillejo, 1990
- Family: Papillodermatidae; Wikton, Martin & Castillejo, 1990
- Genus: Papilloderma; Wikton, Martin & Castillejo, 1990
- Species: P. altonagai

Binomial name
- Papilloderma altonagai Wikton, Martin & Castillejo, 1990

Synonyms
- Papillodermidae

Genus of gastropods

Papilloderma altonagai is a species of air-breathing land slug, a terrestrial pulmonate gastropod mollusc in the informal group Sigmurethra.

Papilloderma altonagai is the only species in the genus Papilloderma, which is the only genus within the family Papillodermatidae, which in turn is the only family within the superfamily Papillodermatoidea.

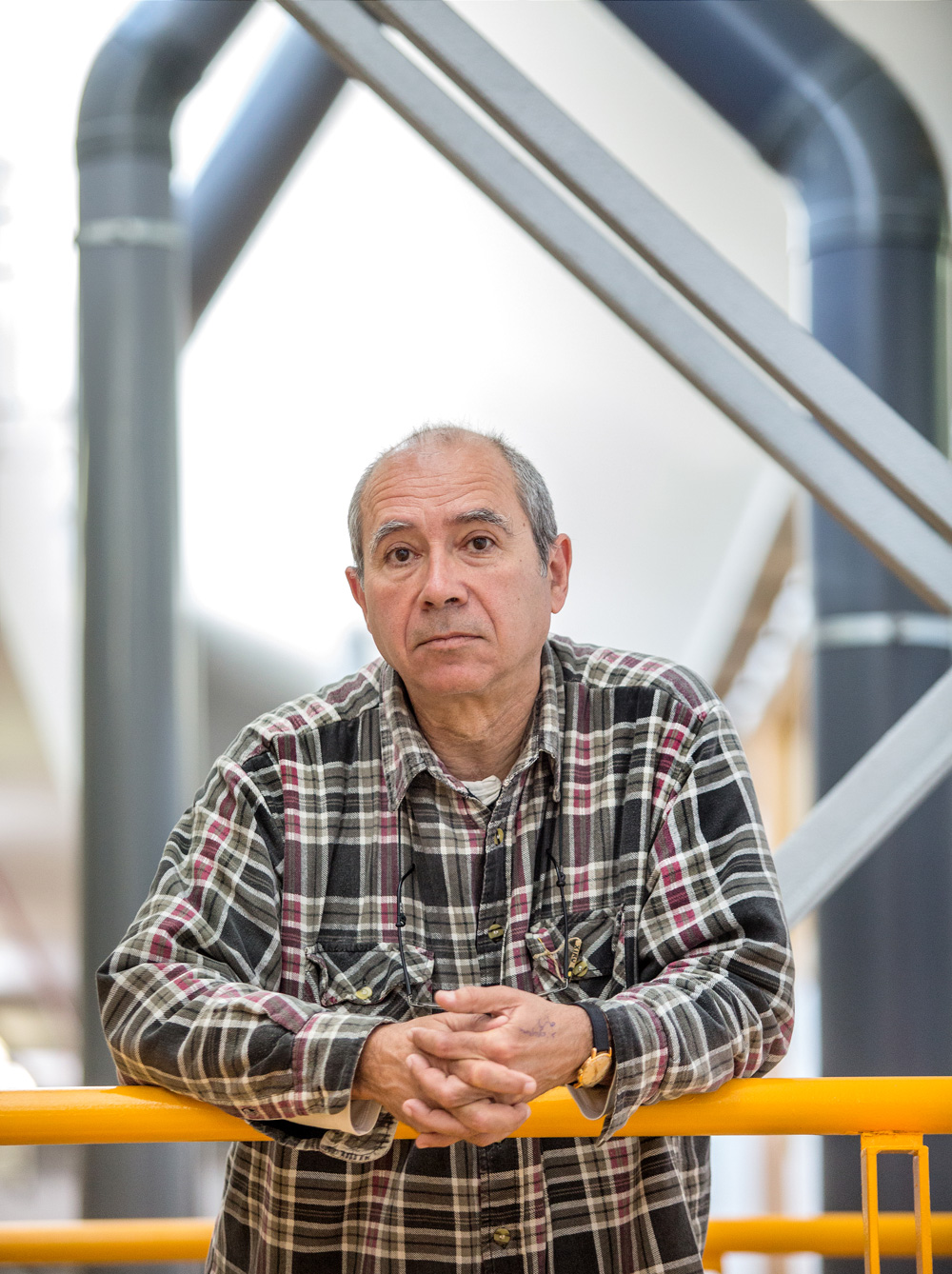
This species is named in honor of Dr. Kepa Altonaga (2009), biologist from the University of the Basque Country.

The generic name Papilloderma is composed from the prefix Papillo- that means "papilla" and from the suffix -derma from Greek language that means "skin". This name was chosen because the body has conical papillae arranged in rows. The specific name altonagai is in honor of the malacologist Dr. Kepa Altonaga from the University of the Basque Country, who collected the first specimen of this species.

Distribution of Papilloderma altonagai

This species is endemic to northern Spain.
