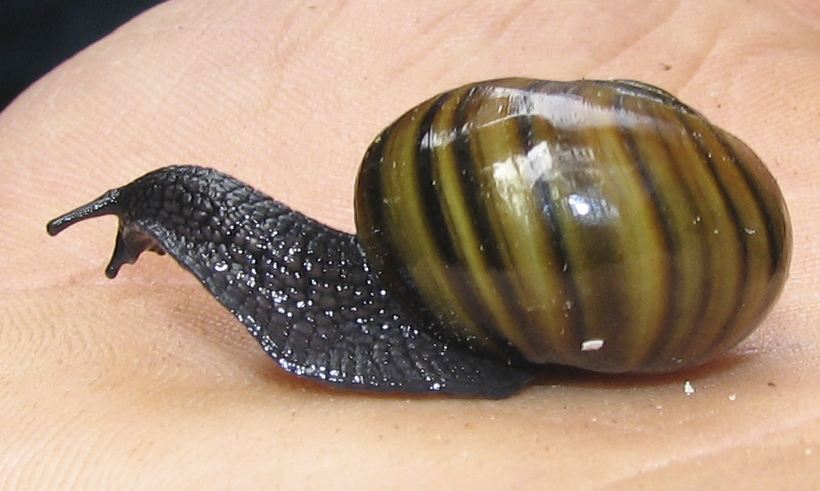
- Powelliphanta "Augustus"

Scientific classification
- Kingdom: Animalia
- Phylum: Mollusca
- Class: Gastropoda
- Order: Stylommatophora
- Suborder: Helicina
- Infraorder: Rhytidoidei
- Superfamily: Rhytidoidea; Pilsbry, 1893

Families
- See text

Synonyms
- Acavoidea

= Rhytidoidea =

Superfamily of gastropods

The Rhytidoidea are a superfamily of air-breathing land snails and slugs, terrestrial gastropod mollusks in the suborder Helicina.

The former taxonomy was based on the study by Nordsieck, published in 1986.

== Taxonomy ==
Families within the superfamily Rhytidoidea are as follows:

- Acavidae Pilsbry, 1895
- Caryodidae Connolly, 1915
- Clavatoridae Thiele, 1926
- Dorcasiidae Connolly, 1915
- Macrocyclidae Thiele, 1926
- Megomphicidae H. B. Baker, 1930
- Odontostomidae Pilsbry & Vanatta, 1898
- Rhytididae Pilsbry, 1893
- Strophocheilidae Pilsbry, 1902
- † Vidaliellidae H. Nordsieck, 1986

Synonyms

- Acavinae Pilsbry, 1895: synonym of Acavidae Pilsbry, 1895 (superseded rank)
- Ammonitellidae Pilsbry, 1930: synonym of Megomphicidae H. B. Baker, 1930
- Anoglyptidae Iredale, 1937: synonym of Caryodidae Connolly, 1915 (junior subjective synonym)
- Aperidae Möllendorff, 1903: synonym of Chlamydephorinae T. D. A. Cockerell, 1935 (1903)
- Chlamydephoridae T. D. A. Cockerell, 1935 (1903): synonym of Chlamydephorinae T. D. A. Cockerell, 1935 (1903)
- Corillidae Pilsbry, 1905: synonym of Corillinae Pilsbry, 1905 (superseded rank)
- Hedleyellidae Iredale, 1937: synonym of Caryodidae Connolly, 1915
- Occirheneidae Iredale, 1939: synonym of Rhytidinae Pilsbry, 1893
- Paryphantidae Godwin-Austen, 1893: synonym of hytidinae Pilsbry, 1893
- Pedinogyridae Iredale, 1937: synonym of Caryodidae Connolly, 1915
