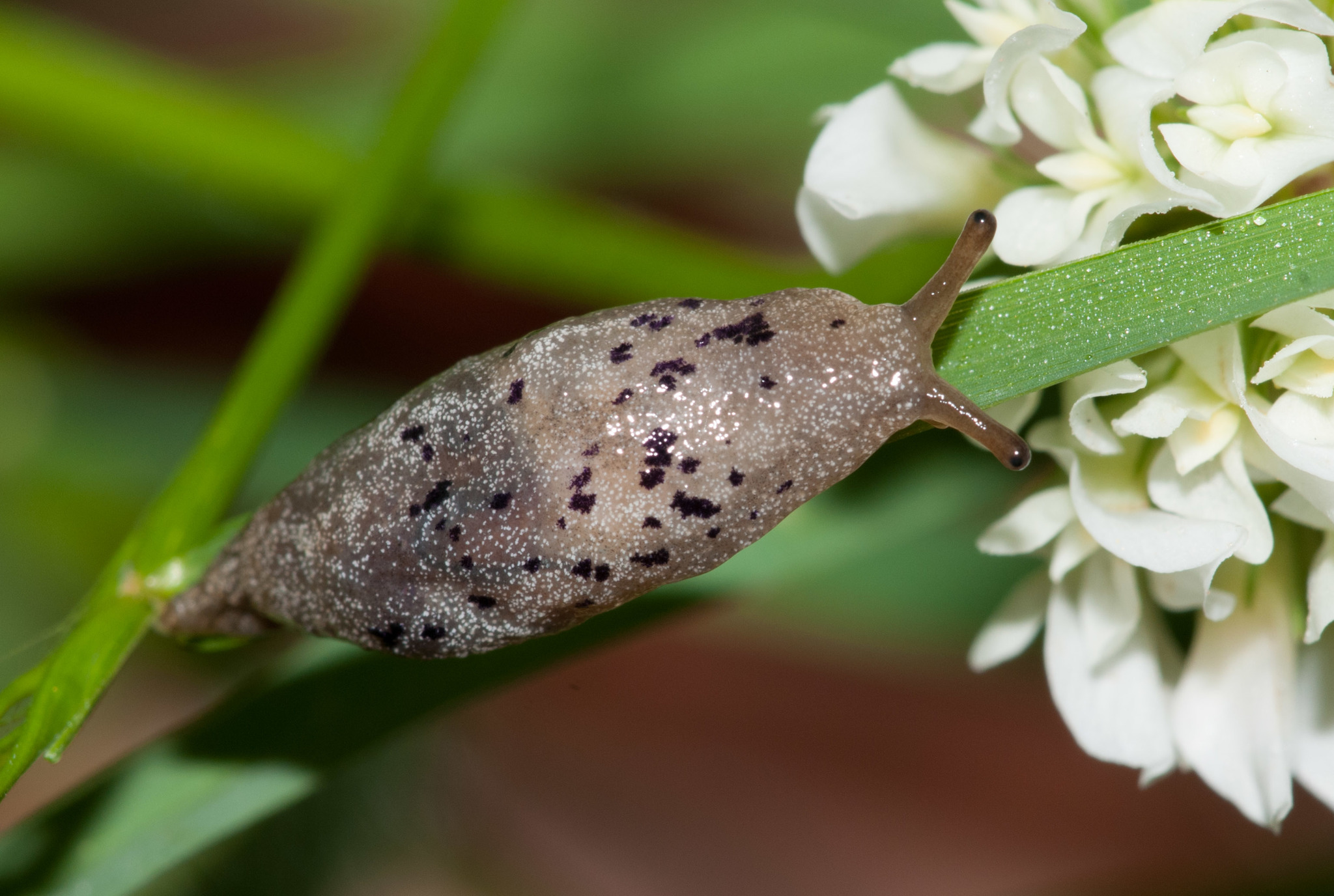
- Cystopelta purpurea

Scientific classification
- Kingdom: Animalia
- Phylum: Mollusca
- Class: Gastropoda
- Order: Stylommatophora
- Superfamily: Punctoidea
- Family: Cystopeltidae; Cockerell, 1891

Genera
- See text

= Cystopeltidae =

Family of gastropods

Cystopeltidae is a family of air-breathing land slugs, terrestrial pulmonate gastropod mollusks in the superfamily Punctoidea (according to the taxonomy of the Gastropoda by Bouchet & Rocroi, 2005).

== Genera and species ==
The family Cystopeltidae has no subfamilies. Genera and species within the family Cystopeltidae include:

- Cystopelta
  - Cystopelta astra
  - Cystopelta bicolor
  - Cystopelta petterdi
  - Cystopelta purpurea
