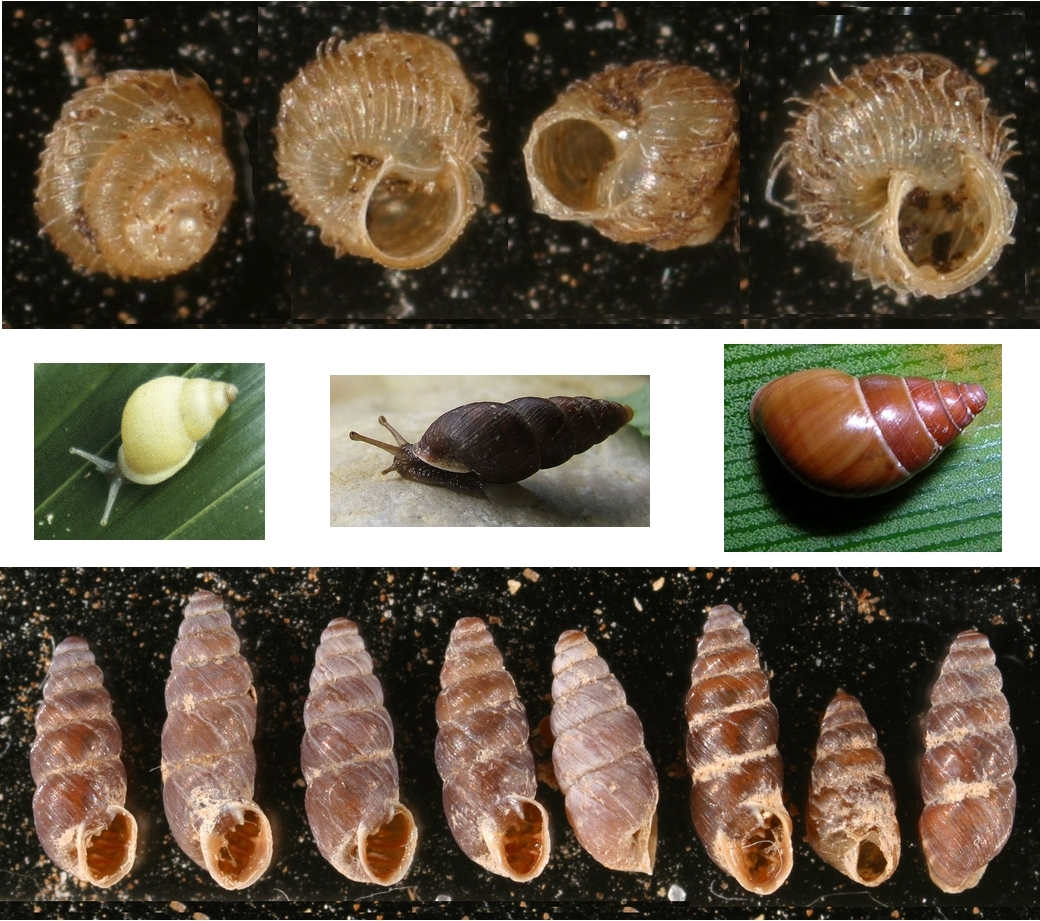
- Various examples of Orthurethra

Scientific classification
- Kingdom: Animalia
- Phylum: Mollusca
- Class: Gastropoda
- Order: Stylommatophora
- Suborder: Helicina
- Infraorder: Orthurethra

Superfamilies
- See text

= Orthurethra =

Orthurethra Temporal range: Cretaceous–Recent

Clade of gastropods

Orthurethra is a clade of air-breathing land snails, terrestrial pulmonate gastropod mollusks in the clade Stylommatophora.

In the taxonomy of the Gastropoda by Bouchet & Rocroi, 2005, Orthurethra is treated as an informal group and subclade of Stylommatophora.

In the revised taxonomy of 2017 this taxon is no longer supported and has been replaced by the infraorder Pupilloidei.

== Superfamilies and families ==
Superfamilies and families within the clade Orthurethra:

(Families that are exclusively fossil are indicated with a dagger †)

- Superfamily Pupilloidea
- Achatinellidae Gulick, 1873
- Agardhiellidae Harl & Páll-Gergely, 2017
- Amastridae Pilsbry, 1910
- Argnidae Hudec, 1965
- Azecidae H. Watson, 1920
- Cerastidae Wenz, 1923
- Chondrinidae Steenberg, 1925
- Cochlicopidae Pilsbry, 1900 (1879)
- † Cylindrellinidae
- Draparnaudiidae Solem, 1962
- Enidae B. B. Woodward, 1903 (1880)
- Fauxulidae Harl & Páll-Gergely, 2017
- Gastrocoptidae Pilsbry, 1918
- Lauriidae Steenberg, 1925
- Odontocycladidae Hausdorf, 1996
- Orculidae Pilsbry, 1918
- Pagodulinidae Pilsbry, 1924
- Partulidae Pilsbry, 1900
- Pleurodiscidae Wenz, 1923
- Pupillidae W. Turton, 1831
- Pyramidulidae Kennard & B. B. Woodward, 1914
- Spelaeoconchidae A. J. Wagner, 1928
- Spelaeodiscidae Steenberg, 1925
- Strobilopsidae Wenz, 1915
- Truncatellinidae Steenberg, 1925
- Valloniidae Morse, 1864
- Vertiginidae Fitzinger, 1833
