= Fauxulidae =

Scientific classification
- Kingdom: Animalia
- Phylum: Mollusca
- Class: Gastropoda
- Order: Stylommatophora
- Suborder: Helicina
- Infraorder: Pupilloidei
- Superfamily: Pupilloidea
- Family: Fauxulidae; Harl & Páll-Gergely, 2017

Family of molluscs

Fauxulidae is a family of gastropods belonging to the superfamily Pupilloidea of the order Stylommatophora.

Genera:

- Afriboysidia Zilch, 1939
- Anisoloma Ancey, 1901
- Fauxulella Pilsbry, 1917
- Fauxulus Schaufuss, 1869
- Tomigerella Pfeiffer, 1879

Synonym

- Faula H. Adams & A. Adams, 1855: synonym of Fauxulus Schaufuss, 1869
