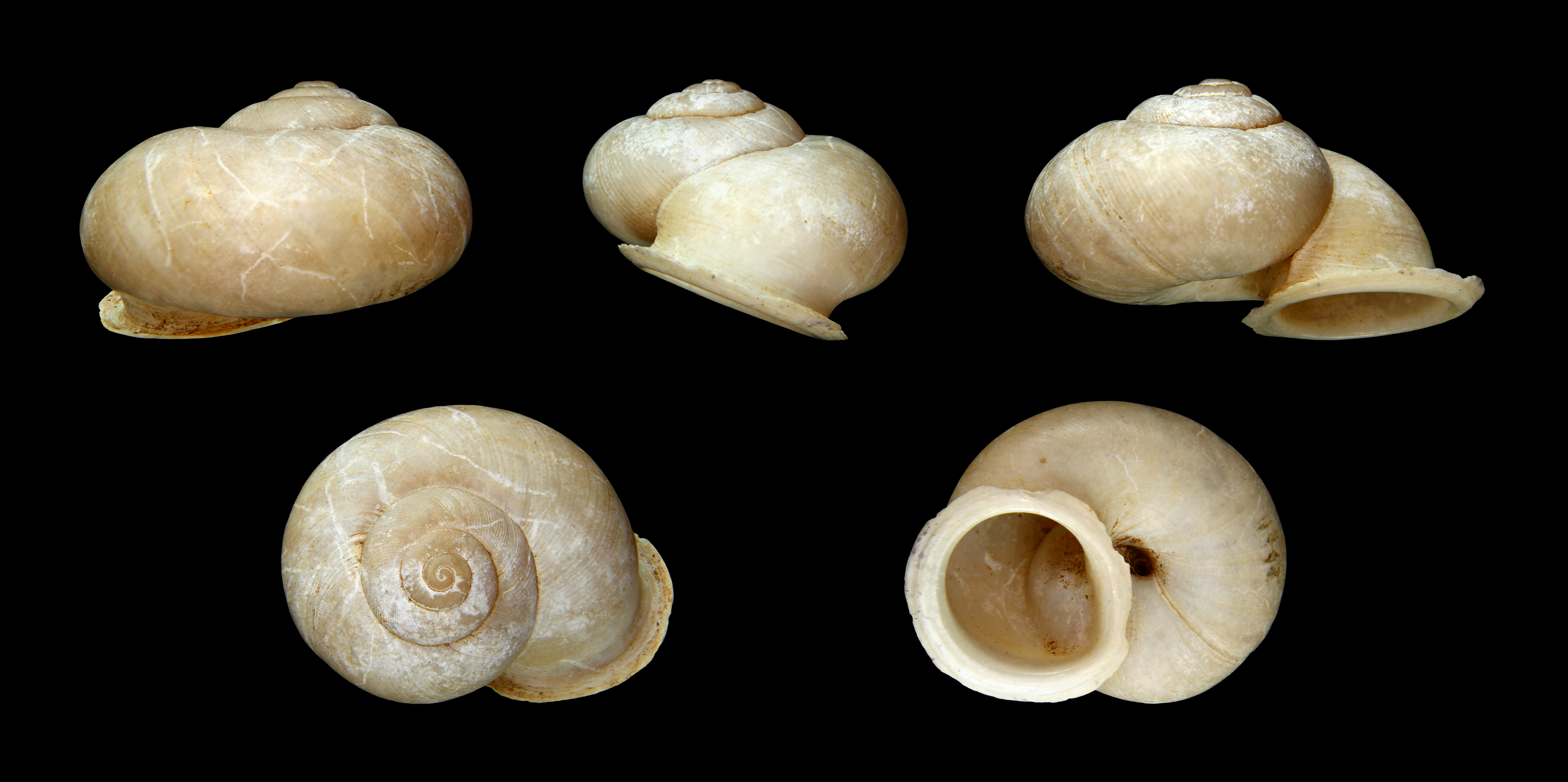
- Dorcasia alexandri Gray, 1838

Scientific classification
- Kingdom: Animalia
- Phylum: Mollusca
- Class: Gastropoda
- Order: Stylommatophora
- Informal group: Sigmurethra
- Superfamily: Acavoidea
- Family: Dorcasiidae; Connolly, 1915

= Dorcasiidae =

Family of gastropods

Dorcasiidae is a family of air-breathing land snails, terrestrial pulmonate gastropod mollusks in the superfamily Acavoidea (according to the taxonomy of the Gastropoda by Bouchet & Rocroi, 2005).

The family Dorcasiidae has no subfamilies.

== Distribution ==
Found in southern Africa.

== Genera ==
Genera within the family Dorcasiidae include:

- Dorcasia Gray, 1838 - the type genus of the family Dorcasiidae
- Trigonephrus Pilsbry, 1905
- Tulbaghinia Melvill & Ponsonby, 1898
