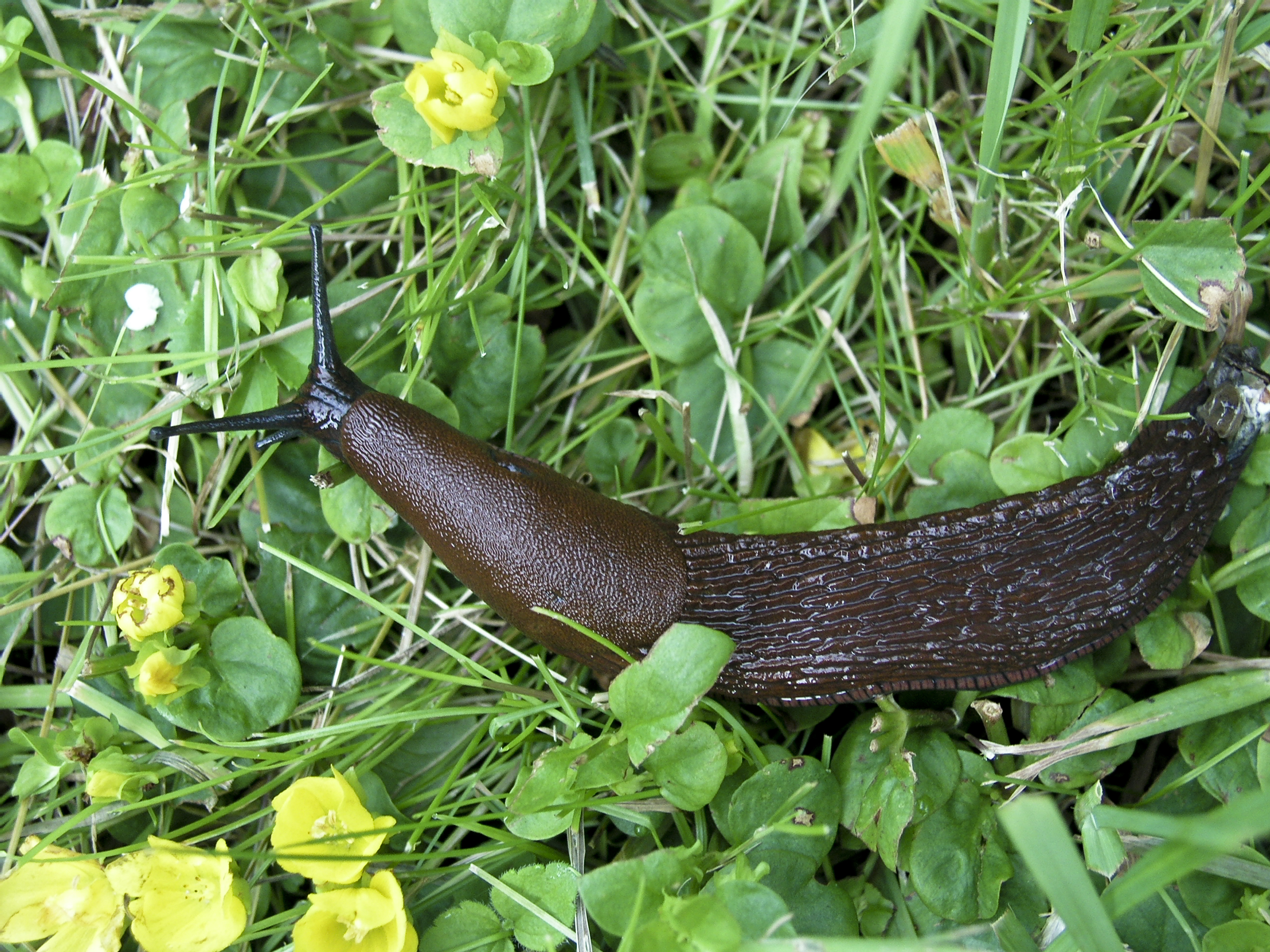
- A live individual of the Spanish slug Arion vulgaris, in the Arionidae

Scientific classification
- Kingdom: Animalia
- Phylum: Mollusca
- Class: Gastropoda
- Order: Stylommatophora
- Suborder: Helicina
- Infraorder: Arionoidei
- Superfamily: Arionoidea; J.E. Gray, 1840

= Arionoidea =

Superfamily of gastropods

Arionoidea is a taxonomic group, superfamily of air-breathing land slugs, shell-less terrestrial pulmonate gastropod mollusks.

== Families ==
Families within the superfamily Arionoidea include:

- Arionidae
- Anadenidae
- Ariolimacidae
- Binneyidae
- Oopeltidae
- Philomycidae
