= Strophocheiloidea =

Scientific classification
- Kingdom: Animalia
- Phylum: Mollusca
- Class: Gastropoda
- Informal group: Pulmonata
- Superfamily: Strophocheiloidea; Thiele, 1926

Superfamily of gastropods

Strophocheiloidea is a superfamily of gastropods and are native to Brazil.
