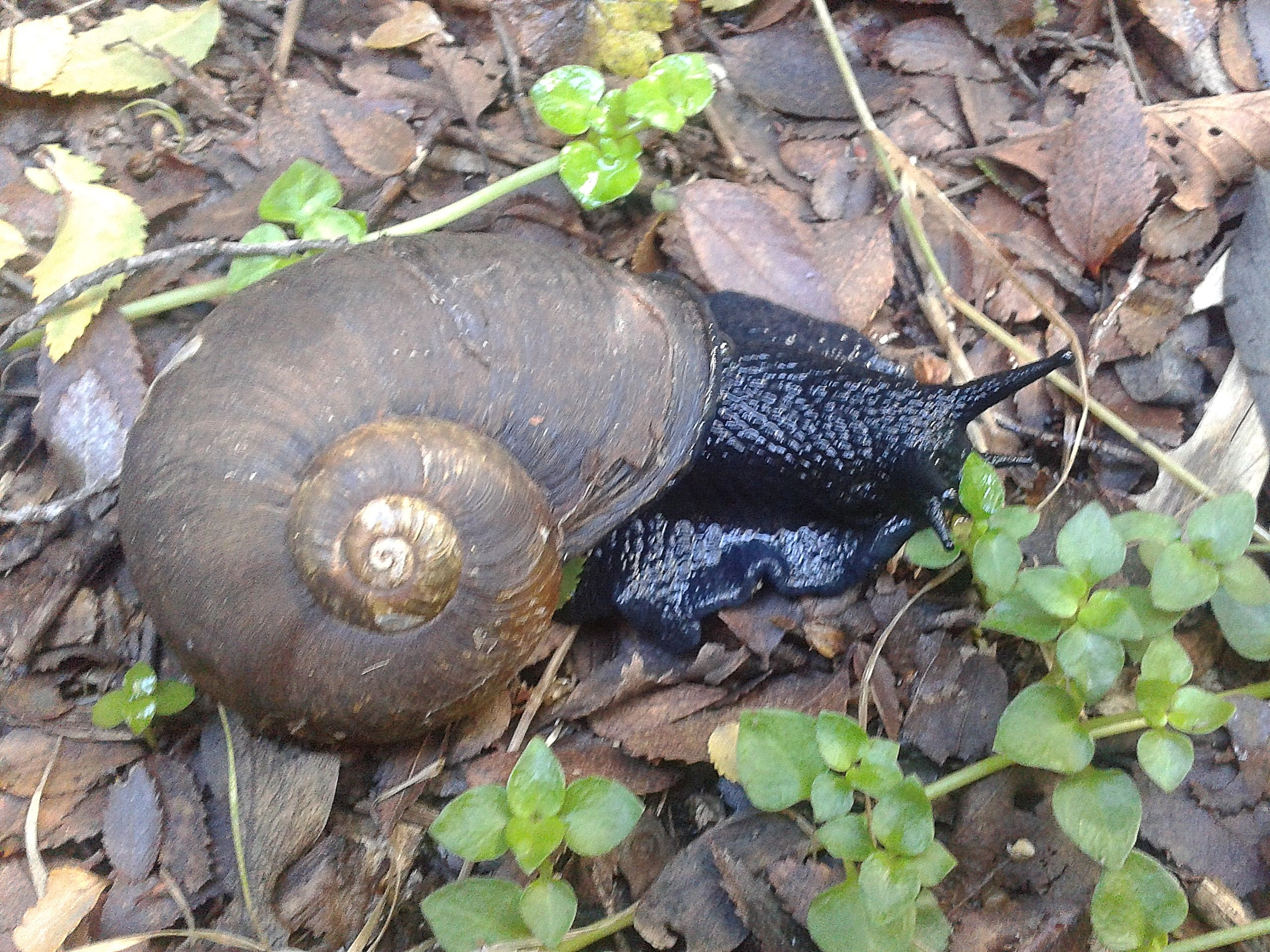
- Macrocyclidae

Scientific classification
- Kingdom: Animalia
- Phylum: Mollusca
- Class: Gastropoda
- Order: Stylommatophora
- Informal group: Sigmurethra
- Superfamily: Acavoidea
- Family: Macrocyclidae

Genera
- See text

= Macrocyclidae =

Family of gastropods

Macrocyclidae is a family of air-breathing land snails, terrestrial pulmonate gastropod mollusks in the superfamily Acavoidea.

== Genera ==
The family Macrocyclidae has no subfamilies.

Genera within the family Macrocyclidae include:

- Macrocyclis, the type genus
