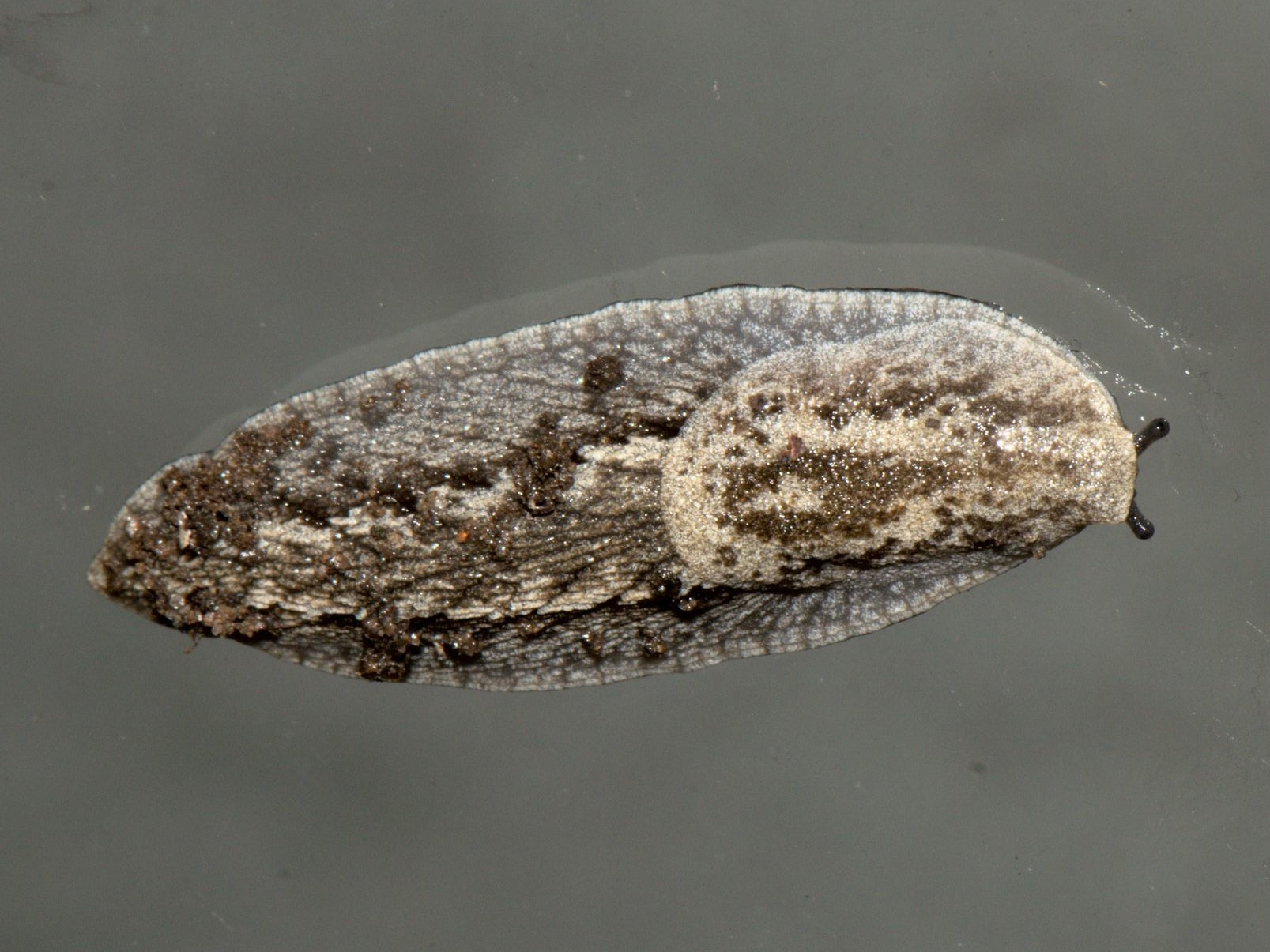
- Anadenus altivagus

Scientific classification
- Kingdom: Animalia
- Phylum: Mollusca
- Class: Gastropoda
- Order: Stylommatophora
- Superfamily: Arionoidea
- Family: Anadenidae; Pilsbry, 1948

Genera
- See text

= Anadenidae =

Family of gastropods

Anadenidae is a family of air-breathing land slugs, terrestrial pulmonate gastropod mollusks in the superfamily Arionidae.

== Genera ==
Two genera are recognised in the Family Anadenidae:

- Anadeninus Simroth, 1912
- Anadenus Heynemann, 1863 - type genus
