= Anostomopsidae =

Scientific classification
- Kingdom: Animalia
- Phylum: Mollusca
- Class: Gastropoda
- Order: Stylommatophora
- Suborder: incertae sedis
- Family: †Anostomopsidae; H. Nordsieck, 1986

Genera
- See text

Synonyms
- Anastomopsidae

Extinct family of gastropods

Anostomopsidae is an extinct family of fossil gastropods in the order Stylommatophora. It was originally described in 1986 and its classification was confirmed in 2005.

== Genera ==
The following genera are accepted within Anostomopsidae:

- †Anostomopsis F. Sandberger, 1870
- †Enneopsis Wenz, 1940
- †Eoplicadomus Hrubesch, 1965
- †Gosavidiscus Hrubesch, 1965
- †Proterocorilla Hrubesch, 1965
- †Pseudostrobilus Oppenheim, 1892
- †Strophostomella P. Fischer, 1883
