= Filholiidae =

Scientific classification
- Kingdom: Animalia
- Phylum: Mollusca
- Class: Gastropoda
- Order: Stylommatophora
- Superfamily: Clausilioidea
- Family: †Filholiidae; Wenz 1923

Type genus
- Filholia Bourguignat, 1877

Genera
- See text

Extinct family of gastropods

†Filholiidae is an extinct family of fossil air-breathing land snails, terrestrial pulmonate gastropod mollusks in the superfamily Clausilioidea (according to the taxonomy of the Gastropoda by Bouchet & Rocroi, 2005).

== Genera ==
Genera within the genus Filholiidae include:

- Filholia, the type genus
- Triptychia Sandberger, 1876
