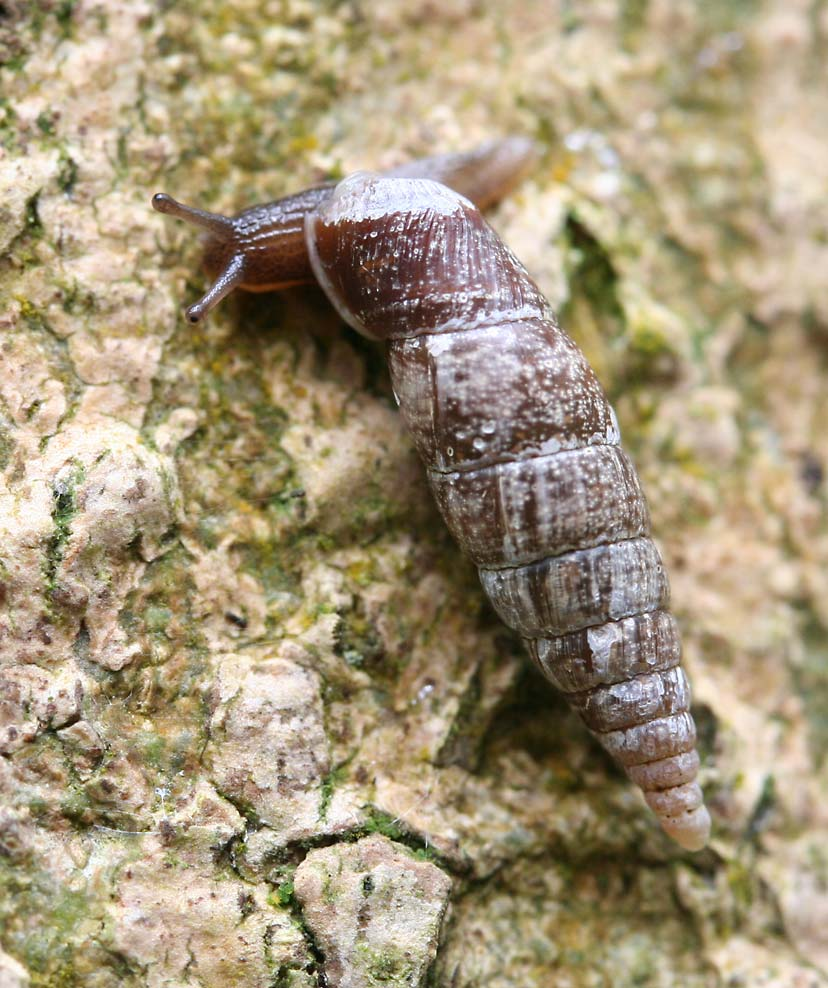
- Cochlodina laminata

Scientific classification
- Kingdom: Animalia
- Phylum: Mollusca
- Class: Gastropoda
- Order: Stylommatophora
- Suborder: Helicina
- Infraorder: Clausilioidei
- Superfamily: Clausilioidea; J. E. Gray, 1855

= Clausilioidea =

Superfamily of gastropods

The Clausilioidea are a superfamily of air-breathing land snails and slugs, terrestrial gastropod mollusks in the informal group Sigmurethra.

This classification was based on different studies dealing with the Clausiliidae, published by H. Nordsieck in 1978, 1979, 1981, 1985, 1994, 1997 and 1998.

== Taxonomy ==
- Family Clausiliidae Gray, 1855
- † Family Anadromidae Wenz, 1940
- † Family Filholiidae Wenz, 1923
- † Family Palaeostoidae H. Nordsieck, 1986
