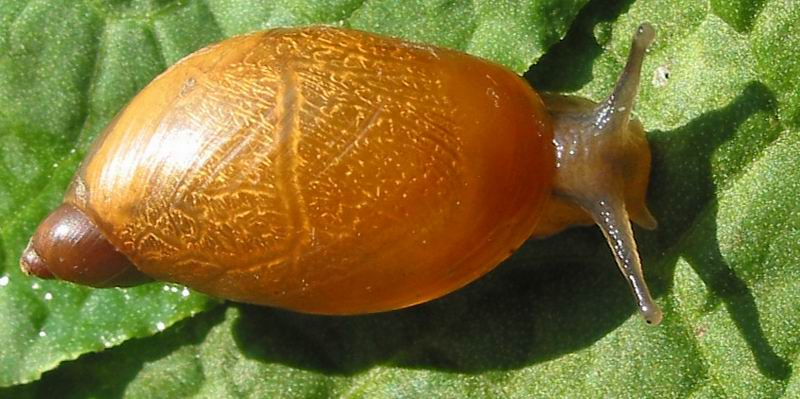
- Succinea putris in the Succineidae

Scientific classification
- Kingdom: Animalia
- Phylum: Mollusca
- Class: Gastropoda
- Order: Stylommatophora
- Suborder: Helicina
- Infraorder: Elasmognatha

Superfamilies
- See text

= Elasmognatha =

Clade of gastropods

Elasmognatha is a taxonomic grouping, a clade, of air-breathing land snails and slugs, terrestrial pulmonate gastropod molluscs.

A number of species in this taxonomic group are endangered.

== Taxonomy ==
In the taxonomy of the Gastropoda by Bouchet & Rocroi, 2005, Elasmognatha is treated as a clade within the larger clade Stylommatophora.

The following two superfamilies and families have been recognized in the taxonomy of Bouchet & Rocroi (2005):

- superfamily Succineoidea
  - family Succineidae
- superfamily Athoracophoroidea
  - family Athoracophoridae
