= Palaeostoidae =

Scientific classification
- Kingdom: Animalia
- Phylum: Mollusca
- Class: Gastropoda
- Order: Stylommatophora
- Superfamily: Clausilioidea
- Family: †Palaeostoidae; H. Nordsieck (1986)

Genera
- †Palaeostoa

Extinct family of gastropods

Palaeostoidae is an extinct family of air-breathing land snails, terrestrial gastropod molluscs in the superfamily Clausilioidea.

== Subfamilies and genera ==
The family Palaeostoidae consists of one genus, Palaeostoa.
