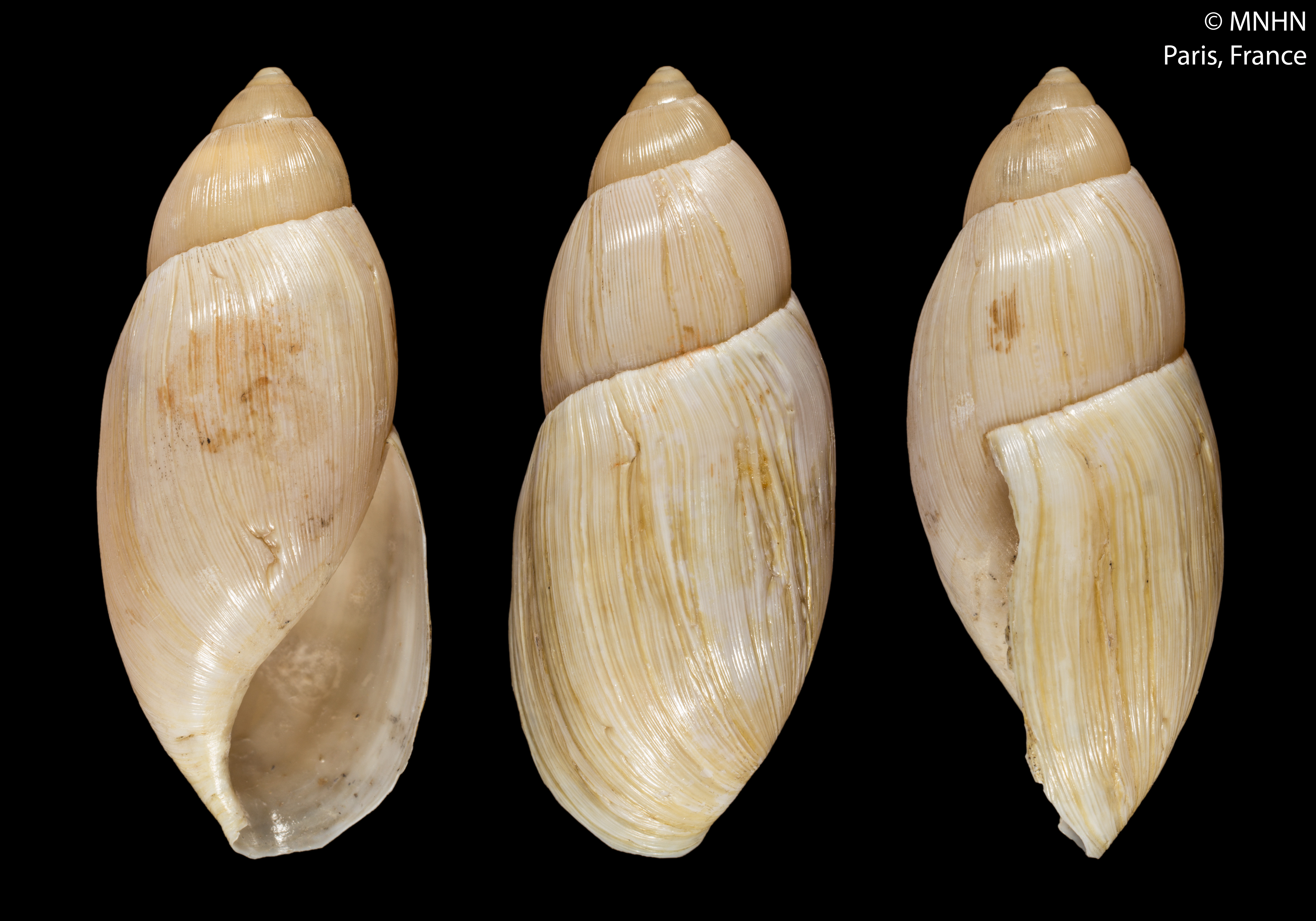
- Shell of Euglandina rosea (syntype at MNHN, Paris)

Scientific classification
- Kingdom: Animalia
- Phylum: Mollusca
- Class: Gastropoda
- Order: Stylommatophora
- Infraorder: Oleacinoidei
- Superfamily: Oleacinoidea; H. Adams & A. Adams, 1855

Families
- See text

= Oleacinoidea =

Superfamily of gastropods

The Oleacinoidea are a superfamily of air-breathing land snails and slugs, terrestrial gastropod mollusks in the suborder Helicina of the order Stylommatophora.

== Taxonomy ==
The following families, previously categorized within the Testacelloidea, were in 2017 transferred to the superfamily Oleacinoidea H. Adams & A. Adams, 1855

- Oleacinidae H. Adams & A. Adams, 1855
- Spiraxidae H. B. Baker, 1939

Synonyms

- Family Glandinidae Bourguignat, 1877: synonym of Oleacinidae H. Adams & A. Adams, 1855 (junior subjective synonym)
