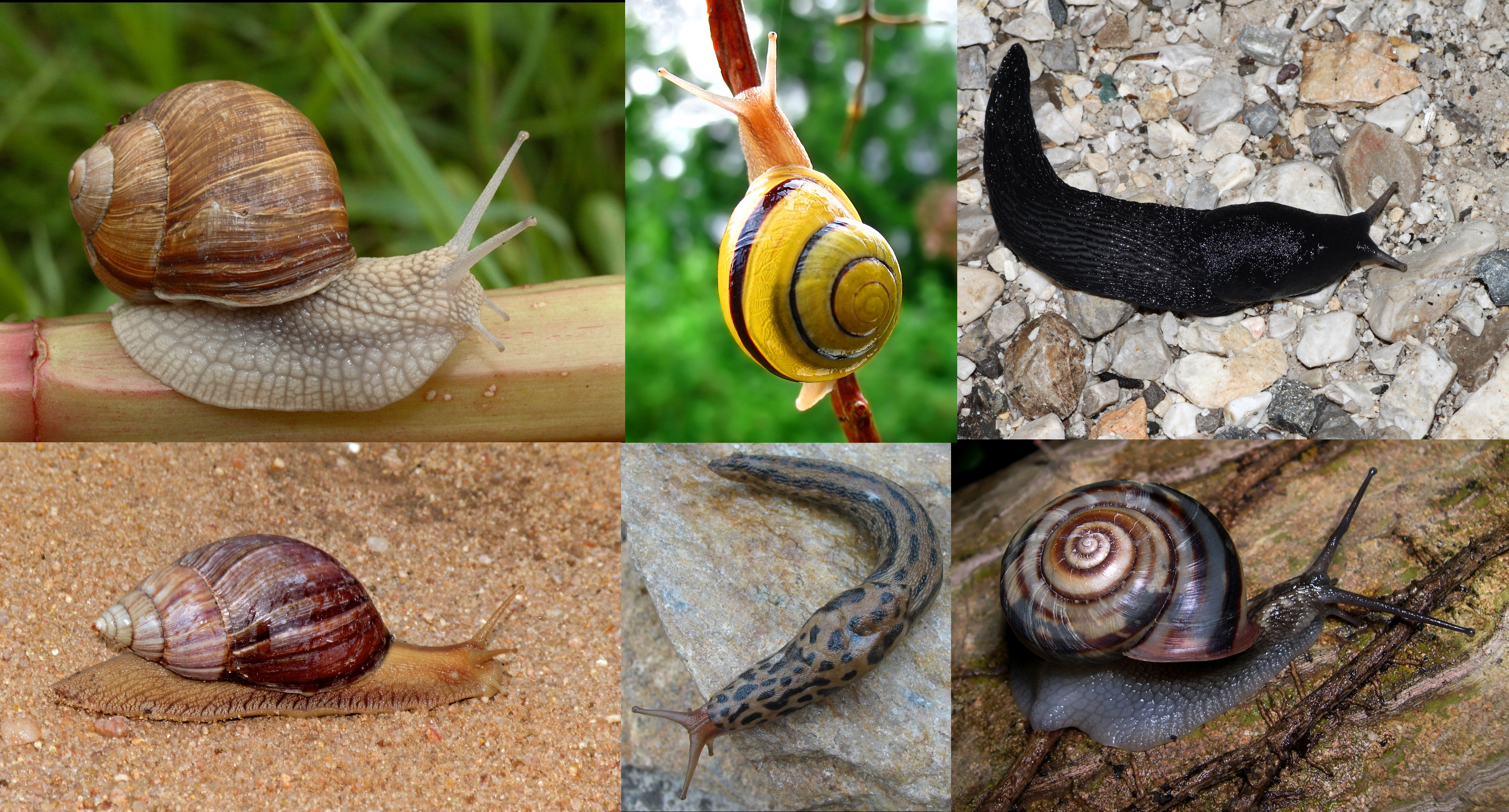

Scientific classification
- Kingdom: Animalia
- Phylum: Mollusca
- Class: Gastropoda
- Superorder: Eupulmonata
- Order: Stylommatophora; A. Schmidt, 1855

Diversity
- about 20,500 species

= Stylommatophora =

Stylommatophora Temporal range: Cretaceous–Recent

Order of gastropods

Stylommatophora is an order of air-breathing land snails and slugs, terrestrial pulmonate gastropod molluscs. This taxon includes most land snails and slugs. Stylommatophorans lack an operculum, but some close their shell apertures with temporary "operculum" (epiphragm) made of calcified mucus. They have two pairs of retractile tentacles, the upper pair of which bears eyes on the tentacle tips. All stylommatophorans are hermaphrodites.

The two strong synapomorphies of Stylommatophora are a long pedal gland placed beneath a membrane and two pairs of retractile tentacles.

Stylommatophora are known from the Cretaceous period up to the present day. A molecular clock estimate puts the origin of the crown group also to the Cretaceous.

Stylommatophora is the most diverse group of terrestrial gastropods, with approximately 22,753 species recognized as of 2024.

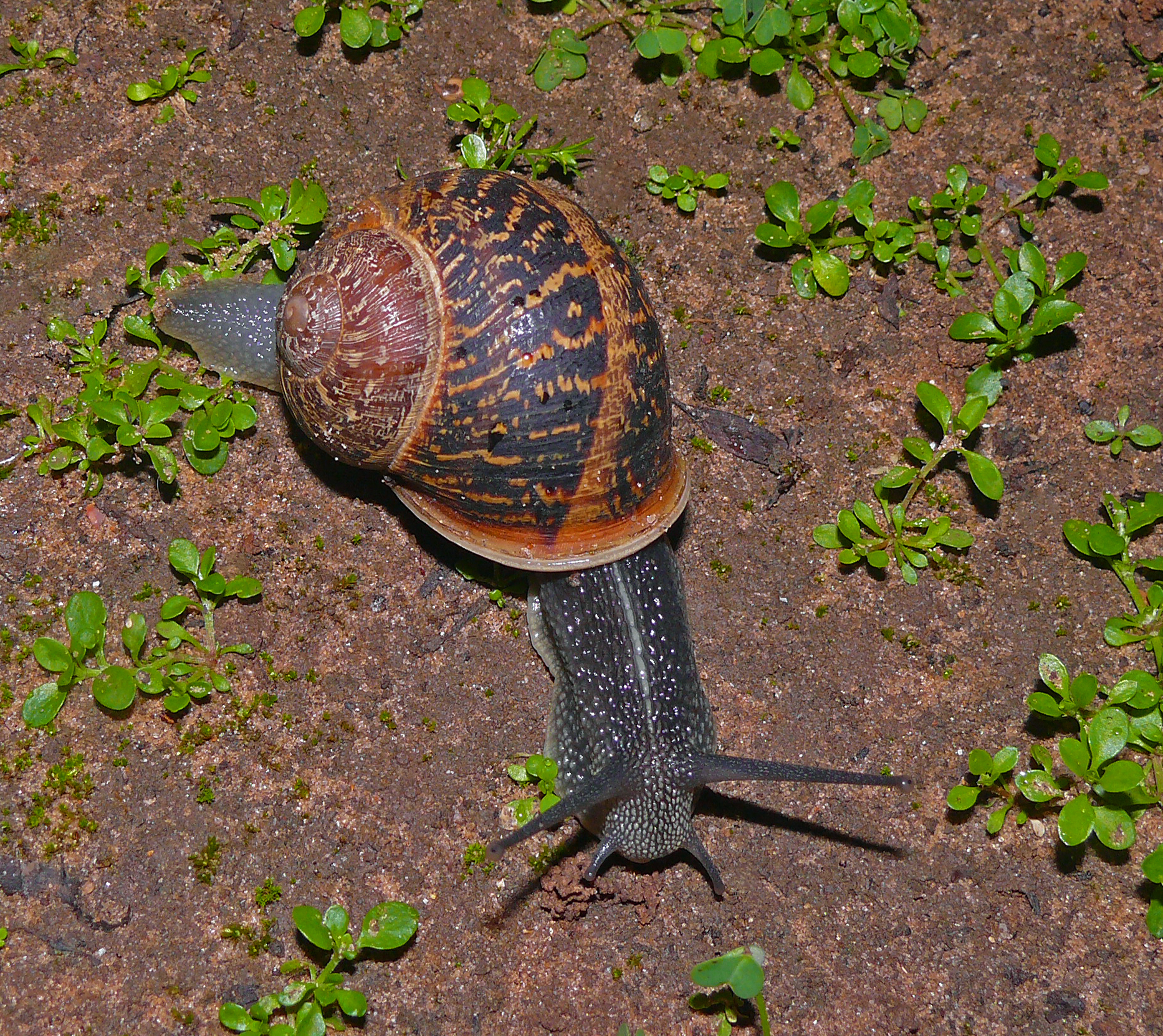
Cornu aspersum (common garden snail)

Caucasotachea atrolabiata (Helicidae)

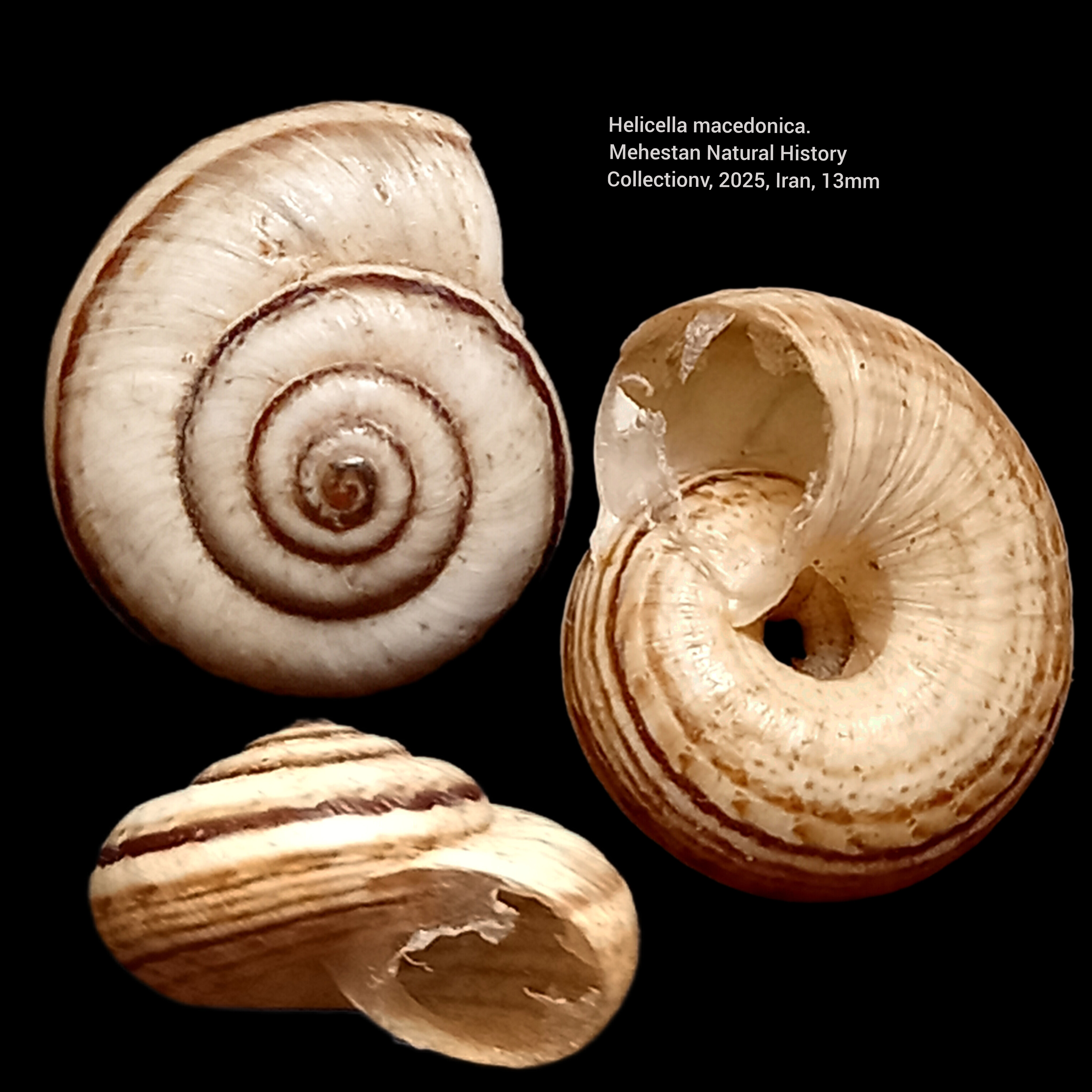
Helicella macedonica (Geomitridae)

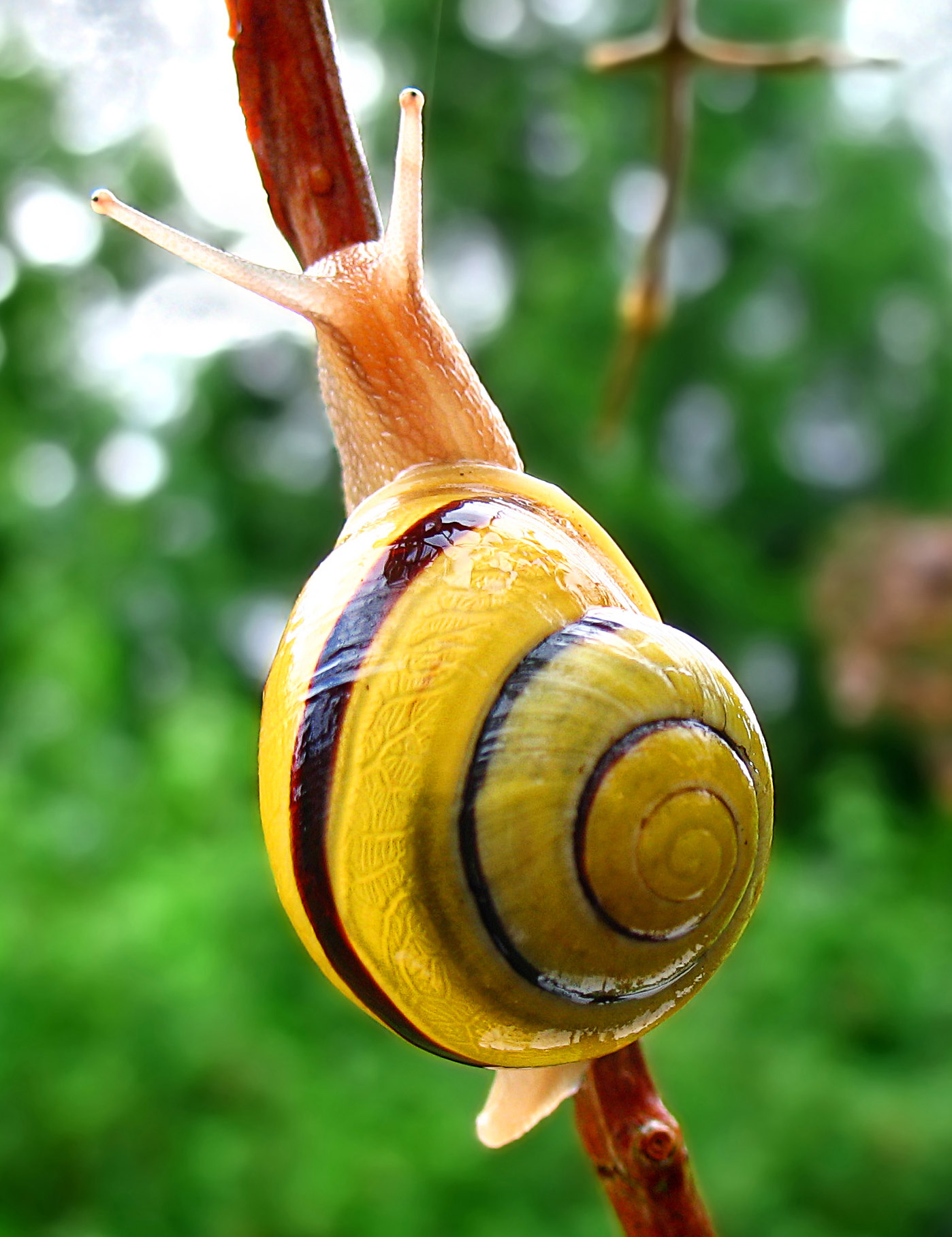
Cepaea hortensis, within the Helicoidea.

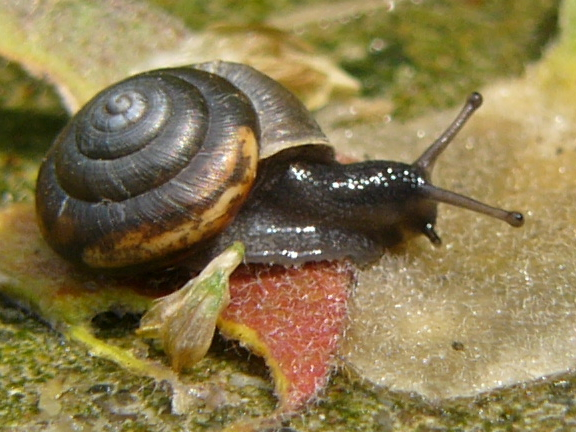
An individual of Trochulus hispidus, a stylommatophoran land snail in the family Hygromiidae within the Helicoidea.

== 2017 taxonomy ==
The most up-to-date formal classification of Stylommatophora is that of Bouchet et al. (2017). Parts of the 2017 system have become obsolete due to new phylogenetic studies, and continuously updated information may be found at MolluscaBase.

Rhytidoidea is apparently not a monophyletic group, but rather a collection of lineages from the southern hemisphere with unresolved relationships.

Suborder Achatinina ["Achatinoid Clade"]

- Superfamily Achatinoidea Swainson, 1840
  - Achatinidae Swainson, 1840
  - Aillyidae H. B. Baker, 1955
  - Ferussaciidae Bourguignat, 1883
  - Micractaeonidae Schileyko, 1999
- Superfamily Streptaxoidea Gray, 1860
  - Streptaxidae Gray, 1860
  - Diapheridae Panha & Naggs, 2010

Suborder Scolodontina

- Superfamily Scolodontoidea H. B. Baker, 1925
  - Scolodontidae H. B. Baker, 1925

Suborder Helicina ["Non-Achatinoid Clade"]

- incertae sedis
  - Superfamily Coelociontoidea Iredale, 1937
    - Coelociontidae Iredale, 1937
  - Superfamily Papillodermatoidea Wiktor, Martin & Castillejo, 1990
    - Papillodermatidae Wiktor, Martin & Castillejo, 1990
  - Superfamily Plectopyloidea Möllendorff, 1898
    - Plectopylidae Möllendorff, 1898
    - Corillidae Pilsbry, 1905
    - Sculptariidae Degner, 1923
  - Superfamily Punctoidea Morse, 1864
    - Punctidae Morse, 1864
    - Charopidae Hutton, 1884
    - Cystopeltidae Cockerell, 1891
    - Discidae Thiele, 1931
    - Endodontidae Pilsbry, 1895
    - Helicodiscidae H. B. Baker, 1927
    - Oreohelicidae Pilsbry, 1939
  - Superfamily Testacelloidea Gray, 1840
    - Testacellidae Gray, 1840
  - Superfamily Urocoptoidea Pilsbry, 1898
    - Urocoptidae Pilsbry, 1898
    - Cerionidae Pilsbry, 1901
    - Epirobiidae F. G. Thompson, 2012
    - Eucalodiidae P. Fischer & Crosse, 1873
    - Holospiridae Pilsbry, 1946
- Infraorder Succineoidei [= Elasmognatha]
  - Superfamily Succineoidea Beck, 1837
    - Succineidae Beck, 1837
  - Superfamily Athoracophoroidea P. Fischer, 1883
    - Athoracophoridae P. Fischer, 1883
- Infraorder Rhytidoidei
  - Superfamily Rhytidoidea Pilsbry, 1893
    - Rhytididae Pilsbry, 1893
    - Acavidae Pilsbry, 1895
    - Caryodidae Conolly, 1915
    - Clavatoridae Thiele, 1926
    - Dorcasiidae Connolly, 1915
    - Macrocyclidae Thiele, 1926
    - Megomphicidae H. B. Baker, 1930
    - Odontostomidae Pilsbry & Vanatta, 1898 (according to Salvador et al. 2023, in Bouchet et al. classified in Orthalicoidea)
    - Strophocheilidae Pilsbry, 1902
- Infraorder Orthalicoidei
  - Superfamily Orthalicoidea Martens, 1860
    - Orthalicidae Martens, 1860
    - Amphibulimidae P. Fischer, 1873
    - Bothriembryontidae Iredale, 1937
    - Bulimulidae Tryon, 1867
    - Cyclodontinidae Salvador & Breure, 2023 (see Salvador et al. 2023)
    - Megaspiridae Pilsbry, 1904
    - Simpulopsidae Schileyko, 1999
    - Tomogeridae Jousseaume, 1877 (see Salvador et al. 2023)
- Infraorder Pupilloidei [= Orthurethra]
  - Superfamily Pupilloidea Turton, 1831
    - Pupillidae Turton, 1831
    - Achatinellidae Gulick, 1873
    - Agardhiellidae Harl & Páll-Gergely, 2017
    - Amastridae Pilsbry, 1910
    - Argnidae Hudec, 1965
    - Azecidae Watson, 1920
    - Cerastidae Wenz, 1923
    - Chondrinidae Steenberg, 1925
    - Cochlicopidae Pilsbry, 1900
    - Draparnaudiidae Solem, 1962
    - Enidae B. B. Woodward, 1903
    - Fauxulidae Harl & Páll-Gergely, 2017
    - Gastrocoptidae Pilsbry, 1918
    - Lauriidae Steenberg, 1925
    - Odontocycladidae Hausdorf, 1996
    - Orculidae Pilsbry, 1918
    - Pagodulinidae Pilsbry, 1924
    - Partulidae Pilsbry, 1900
    - Pleurodiscidae Wenz, 1923
    - Pyramidulidae Kennard & B. B. Woodward, 1914
    - Spelaeoconchidae A. J. Wagner, 1928 (Croatia, Bosnia and Hercegovina)
    - Spelaeodiscidae Steenberg, 1925
    - Strobilopsidae Wenz, 1915
    - Truncatellinidae Steenberg, 1925
    - Valloniidae Morse, 1864
    - Vertiginidae Fitzinger, 1833
- Infraorder Clausilioidei
  - Superfamily Clausilioidea Gray, 1855
    - Clausiliidae Gray, 1855
    - † Filholiidae Wenz, 1923
    - † Palaeostoidae H. Nordsieck, 1986
- Infraorder Arionoidei
  - Superfamily Arionoidea Gray, 1840
    - Arionidae Gray, 1840
    - Anadenidae Pilsbry, 1948
    - Ariolimacidae Pilsbry & Vanatta, 1898
    - Binneyidae Cockerell, 1891
    - Philomycidae Gray, 1847
- Infraorder Limacoidei ["Limacoid Clade"]
  - Superfamily Limacoidea Batsch, 1789
    - Limacidae Batsch, 1789
    - Agriolimacidae H. Wagner, 1935
    - Boettgerillidae Wiktor & I. M. Likharev, 1979
    - Vitrinidae Fitzinger, 1833
  - Superfamily Gastrodontoidea Tryon, 1866
    - Gastrodontidae Tryon, 1866
    - Oxychilidae Hesse, 1927
    - Pristilomatidae Cockerell, 1891
  - Superfamily Parmacelloidea P. Fischer, 1856
    - Parmacellidae P. Fischer, 1856
    - Milacidae Ellis, 1926
    - Trigonochlamydidae Hesse, 1882
  - Superfamily Zonitoidea Mörch, 1864
    - Zonitidae Mörch, 1864
  - superfamily Trochomorphoidea Mörch, 1864
    - Trochomorphidae Möllendorff, 1890
    - Chronidae Thiele, 1931
    - Dyakiidae Gude & B. B. Woodward, 1921
    - Euconulidae H. B. Baker, 1928
    - Staffordiidae Thiele, 1931
  - Superfamily Helicarionoidea Bourguignat, 1877
    - Helicarionidae Bourguignat, 1877
    - Ariophantidae Godwin-Austen, 1888
    - Urocyclidae Simroth, 1889
- Infraorder Oleacinoidei
  - Superfamily Oleacinoidea H. Adams & A. Adams, 1855
    - Oleacinidae H. Adams & A. Adams, 1855
    - Spiraxidae H. B. Baker, 1939
  - Superfamily Haplotrematoidea H. B. Baker, 1925
    - Haplotrematidae H. B. Baker, 1925
- Infraorder Helicoidei ["Helicoid Clade"]
  - Superfamily Sagdoidea Pilsbry, 1895
    - Sagdidae Pilsbry, 1895
    - Solaropsidae H. Nordsieck, 1986
    - Zachrysiidae Robinson, Sei & Rosenberg, 2017
  - Superfamily Helicoidea Rafinesque, 1815
    - Helicidae Rafinesque, 1815
    - Cepolidae Ihering, 1909
    - Labyrinthidae Borrero, Sei, Robinson & Rosenberg, 2017
    - Thysanophoridae Pilsbry, 1926
    - Camaenidae Pilsbry, 1895
    - Polygyridae Pilsbry, 1895
    - Elonidae Gittenberger, 1977
    - Trissexodontidae H. Nordsieck, 1987
    - Helicodontidae Kobelt, 1904
    - Sphincterochilidae Zilch, 1960
    - Geomitridae C. Boettger, 1909
    - Canariellidae Schileyko, 1991
    - Hygromiidae Tryon, 1866
    - Pleurodontidae Ihering, 1912
    - Trichodiscinidae H. Nordsieck, 1987
    - Xanthonychidae Strebel & Pfeffer, 1879

== 2005 taxonomy ==
According to the taxonomy of the Gastropoda by Bouchet & Rocroi (2005) based on evolutionary ancestry, Stylommatophora is a clade in the clade Eupulmonata within informal group Pulmonata. It uses unranked clades for taxa above the rank of superfamily (replacing the ranks suborder, order, superorder and subclass) and the traditional Linnaean approach for all taxa below the rank of superfamily.

The clade Stylommatophora contains the subclades Elasmognatha, Orthurethra and the informal group Sigmurethra. The term "informal group" has been used to indicate whenever monophyly has not been tested, or where a traditional taxon of gastropods has now been discovered to be paraphyletic or polyphyletic.

informal group Sigmurethra
- Superfamily Clausilioidea
- Superfamily Orthalicoidea
- Superfamily Achatinoidea
- Superfamily Aillyoidea
- Superfamily Testacelloidea
- Superfamily Papillodermatoidea
- Superfamily Streptaxoidea
- Superfamily Rhytidoidea
- Superfamily Acavoidea
- Superfamily Punctoidea
- Superfamily Sagdoidea

"limacoid clade" (within the Sigmurethra)

- Superfamily Staffordioidea
- Superfamily Dyakioidea
- Superfamily Gastrodontoidea
- Superfamily Parmacelloidea
- Superfamily Zonitoidea
- Superfamily Helicarionoidea
- Superfamily Limacoidea

(not in limacoid clade, but is within the Sigmurethra)

- Superfamily Arionoidea
- Superfamily Helicoidea

clade Elasmognatha

- Superfamily Succineoidea
- Superfamily Athoracophoroidea

clade Orthurethra

- Superfamily Partuloidea
- Superfamily Achatinelloidea
- Superfamily Cochlicopoidea
- Superfamily Pupilloidea
- Superfamily Enoidea

== Previous taxonomy ==
- Subinfraorder Orthurethra
  - Superfamily Achatinelloidea Gulick, 1873
  - Superfamily Cochlicopoidea Pilsbry, 1900
  - Superfamily Partuloidea Pilsbry, 1900
  - Superfamily Pupilloidea Turton, 1831
- Subinfraorder Sigmurethra
  - Superfamily Acavoidea Pilsbry, 1895
  - Superfamily Achatinoidea Swainson, 1840
  - Superfamily Aillyoidea Baker, 1960
  - Superfamily Arionoidea J.E. Gray in Turnton, 1840
  - Superfamily Buliminoidea Clessin, 1879
  - Superfamily Camaenoidea Pilsbry, 1895
  - Superfamily Clausilioidea Mörch, 1864
  - Superfamily Dyakioidea Gude & Woodward, 1921
  - Superfamily Gastrodontoidea Tryon, 1866
  - Superfamily Helicoidea Rafinesque, 1815
  - Superfamily Helixarionoidea Bourguignat, 1877
  - Superfamily Limacoidea Rafinesque, 1815
  - Superfamily Oleacinoidea H. Adams & A. Adams, 1855
  - Superfamily Orthalicoidea Albers-Martens, 1860
  - Superfamily Plectopylidoidea Moellendorf, 1900
  - Superfamily Polygyroidea Pilsbry, 1894
  - Superfamily Punctoidea Morse, 1864
  - Superfamily Rhytidoidea Pilsbry, 1893
  - Superfamily Sagdidoidera Pilsbry, 1895
  - Superfamily Staffordioidea Thiele, 1931
  - Superfamily Streptaxoidea J.E. Gray, 1806
  - Superfamily Strophocheiloidea Thiele, 1926
  - Superfamily Trigonochlamydoidea Hese, 1882
  - Superfamily Zonitoidea Mörch, 1864
