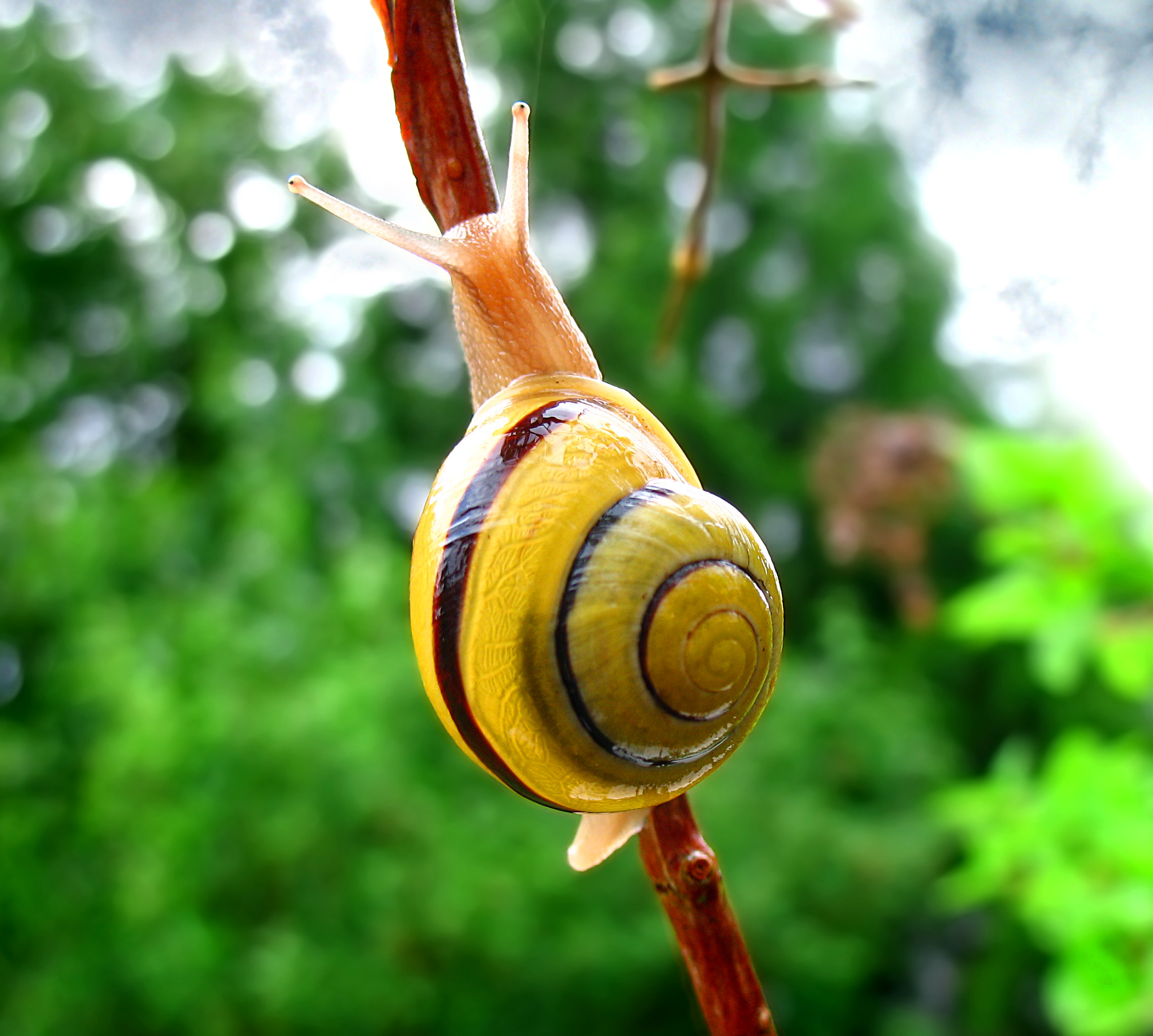
- Cepaea sp.

Scientific classification
- Kingdom: Animalia
- Phylum: Mollusca
- Class: Gastropoda
- Subcohort: Panpulmonata
- Superorder: Eupulmonata; Haszprunar & Huber, 1990

Orders
- Systellommatophora; Stylommatophora; Ellobiida

= Eupulmonata =

Clade of gastropods

Eupulmonata is a taxonomic clade of air-breathing gastropod molluscs. The great majority of this group are land snails and slugs, but some are intertidal or inhabit coastal saltmarshes and mangroves.

Possible synapomorphy of the group are globineurons (small cells) in the procerebrum.

Eyes positioned on the tips of the tentacles were considered a synapomorphy of a clade named Geophila (Stylommatophora + Systellommatophora), but a 1972 phylogenomic study found strong support for a clade uniting Ellobioidea (eyes at the base of tentacles) and Systelommatophora (eyes on the tentacle tips). Stalked eyes thus likely evolved twice independently.

== Taxonomy ==
- Order Ellobiida
  - Superfamily Ellobioidea L. Pfeiffer, 1854
    - Ellobiidae L. Pfeiffer, 1854
    - Otinidae H. Adams & A. Adams, 1855
    - Trimusculidae J. Q. Burch, 1945
- Order Systellommatophora
  - Superfamily Onchidioidea Rafinesque, 1815
    - Onchidiidae Rafinesque, 1815
  - Superfamily Veronicelloidea Gray, 1840
    - Veronicellidae Gray, 1840
    - Rathouisiidae Heude, 1885
- Order Stylommatophora
  - (for inner division, see the Stylommatophora page)

Caucasotachea atrolabiata

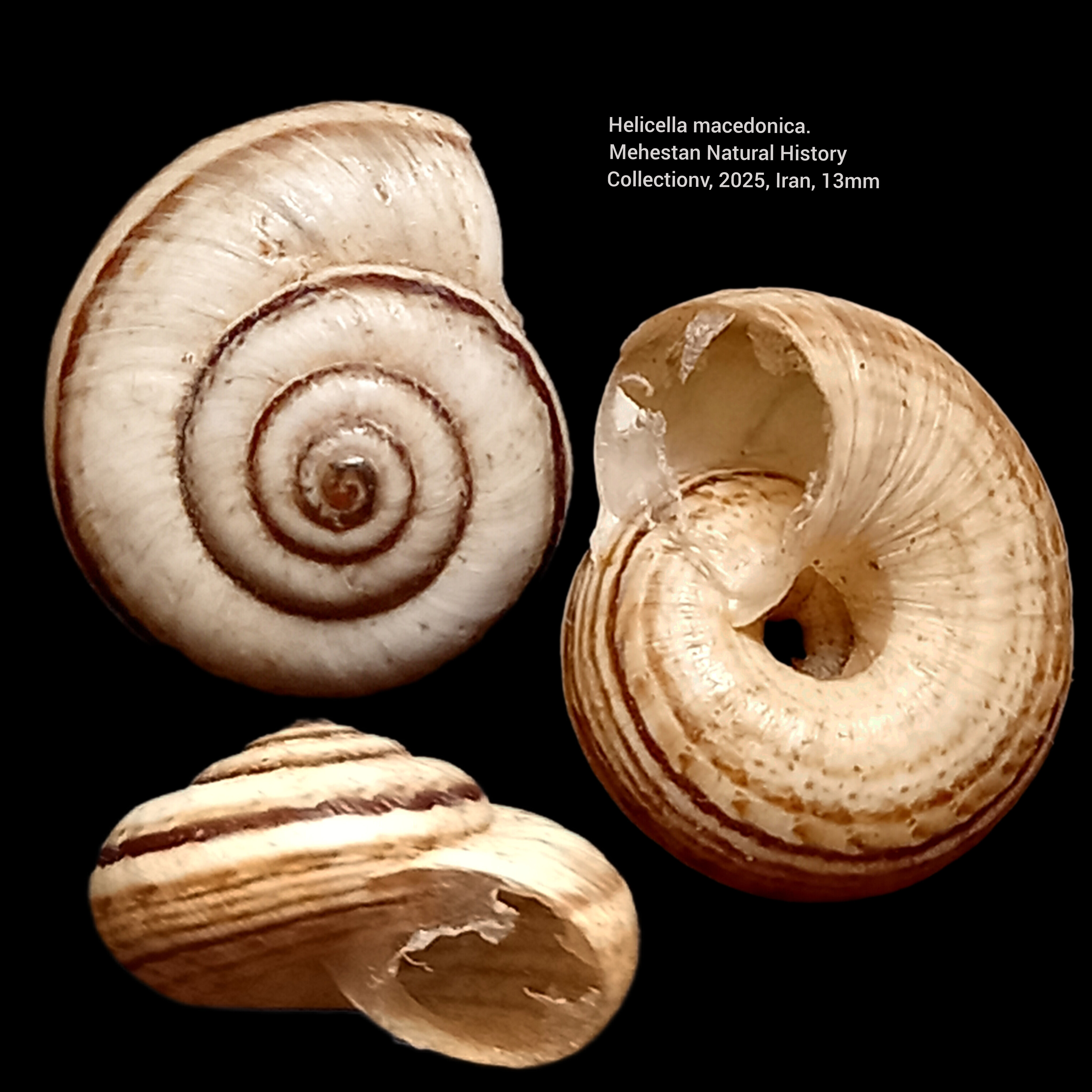
Helicella macedonica
