= List of animals that are extinct in the wild =

As of 2026, the International Union for Conservation of Nature (IUCN) listed 41 animal species as extinct in the wild. That is approximately 0.04% of all evaluated animal species. The IUCN also lists five animal subspecies as extinct in the wild.

This is a complete list of wild animal species and subspecies listed as extinct by the IUCN. Some of these species, such as Partula faba, have since become entirely extinct.

== Molluscs ==
Species

- Aylacostoma chloroticum
- Aylacostoma guaraniticum
- Aylacostoma stigmaticum
- Partula garrettii
- Partula hebe
- Partula mirabilis
- Partula mooreana
- Partula navigatoria
- Partula nodosa
- Partula rosea
- Sutural partula (Partula suturalis)
- Partula varia

Subspecies

- Partula suturalis strigosa
- Partula suturalis vexillum
- Partula taeniata elongata
- Partula taeniata nucleola
- Partula taeniata simulans

== Arthropods ==
- Oahu deceptor bush cricket (Leptogryllus deceptor)
- Simandoa cave roach (Simandoa conserfariam)
- Socorro isopod (Thermosphaeroma thermophilum)

== Chordates ==
There are 23 chordate species assessed as extinct in the wild.

=== Amphibians ===
- Wyoming toad (Anaxyrus baxteri) (only in captivity and within Mortenson Lake National Wildlife Refuge in Wyoming)
- Kihansi spray toad (Nectophrynoides asperginis)

=== Mammals ===
- Père David's deer (Elaphurus davidianus)

=== Reptiles ===
- Christmas Island blue-tailed skink (Cryptoblepharus egeriae)
- Christmas Island chained gecko (Lepidodactylus listeri)
- Hoan Kiem turtle (Rafetus leloii)

=== Fish ===
- Dabry's sturgeon (Acipenser dabryanus)
- Banded allotoca (Allotoca goslinei)
- Potosi pupfish (Cyprinodon alvarezi)
- La Palma pupfish (Cyprinodon longidorsalis)
- Charco Palma pupfish (Cyprinodon veronicae)
- Ameca shiner (Notropis amecae)
- Kunimasu (Oncorhynchus kawamurae)
- Racovitza's rudd (Scardinius racovitzai)
- Golden skiffia (Skiffia francesae)
- Monterrey platyfish (Xiphophorus couchianus)
- Marbled swordtail (Xiphophorus meyeri)

=== Birds ===
- Hawaiian crow (Corvus hawaiiensis)
- Spix's macaw (Cyanopsitta spixii)
- Alagoas curassow (Mitu mitu)
- Guam kingfisher (Todiramphus cinnamominus)
- Socorro dove (Zenaida graysoni)

== See also ==
- List of plants that are extinct in the wild
