= Aylacostoma chloroticum =

Conservation status
- Extinct in the Wild (IUCN 2.3)

Scientific classification
- Kingdom: Animalia
- Phylum: Mollusca
- Class: Gastropoda
- Subclass: Caenogastropoda
- Order: incertae sedis
- Family: Hemisinidae
- Genus: Aylacostoma
- Species: A. chloroticum

Binomial name
- Aylacostoma chloroticum Hylton-Scot, 1953

Species of gastropod

Aylacostoma chloroticum is a species of freshwater snail, aquatic gastropod mollusc in the family Hemisinidae. This species is found in Argentina and Paraguay. It was feared that the species had become extinct in the wild as a consequence of the building of the Yacyretá Dam on the Paraná River, but a single small wild population remains. A captive "safety" population is jointly managed by the National University of Misiones and Bernardino Rivadavia Natural Sciences Museum. Its relatives A. brunneum, A. guaraniticum and A. stigmaticum from the same region had a similar fate, but the first only survives in captivity (extinct in the wild) and the last two are entirely extinct.
