= List of non-marine molluscs of Cuba =

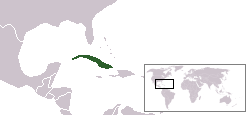
Location of Cuba

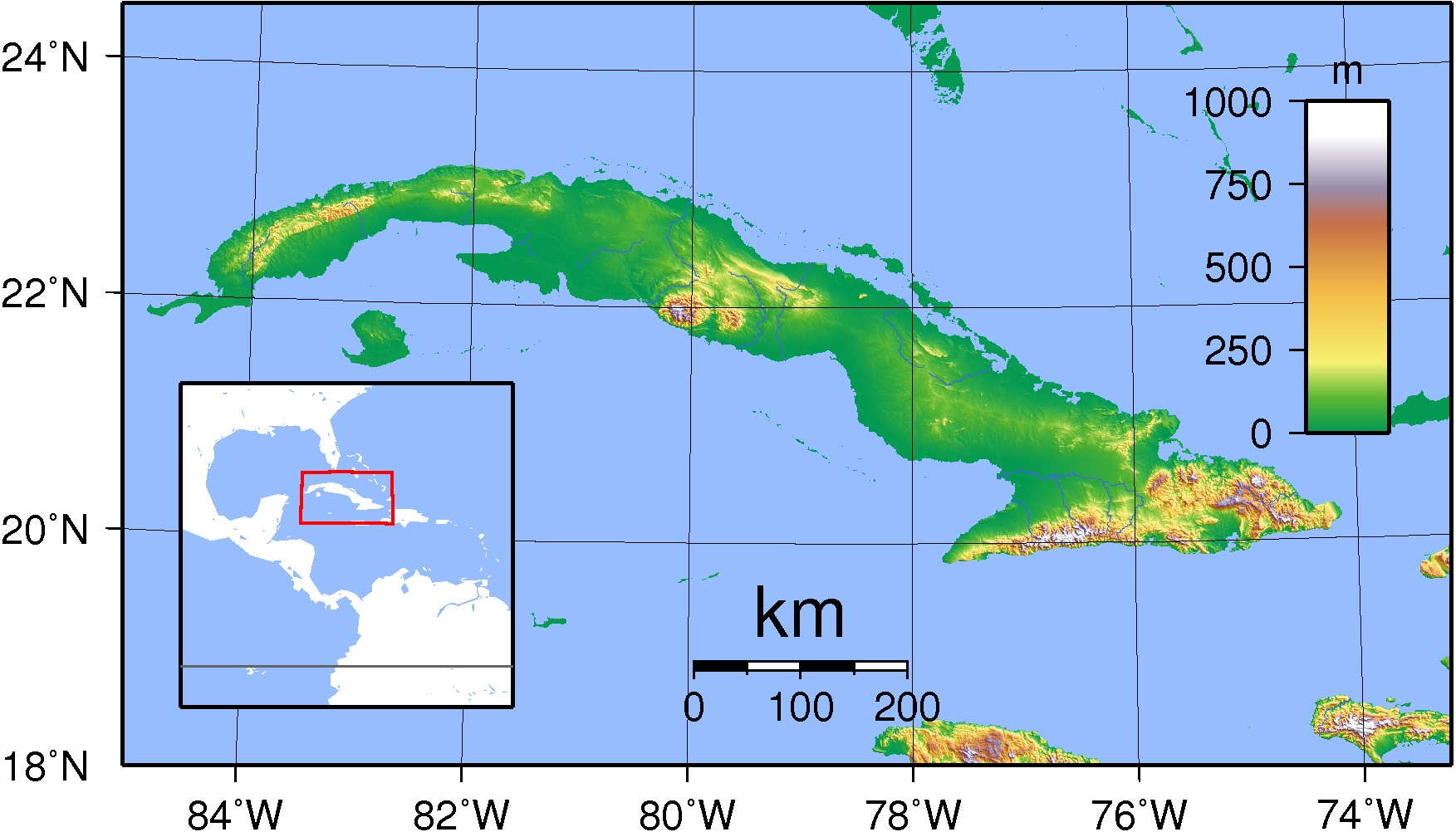
The topography of Cuba: Cuba has mostly flat terrain to rolling plains, with rugged hills and mountains in the southeast.

The non-marine molluscs of Cuba are a part of the molluscan wildlife of Cuba. Numerous species of non-marine molluscs are found in the wild in Cuba, which is in fact one of the richest places for the malacological fauna in the world, especially in land snails, hosting a high degree of endemism. Cuba has some highly charismatic species of land snails, such as those of the genus Polymita and Liguus.

A total of 42 species of freshwater molluscs occur in Cuba. Introduced species such as Tarebia granifera and Melanoides tuberculata are spread throughout the country and might be a threat for endemics and other native snails.

== History ==
There are many works regarding taxonomic and systematic studies in marine and land molluscs with a fewer number on ecology and distribution. Freshwater molluscs, however, are scarcer and have received less attention.

== Freshwater molluscs overview ==
A total of 10 (23.8%) out of 42 described freshwater snails and mussels are endemic in Cuba. The percentage of endemism shown in Cuban freshwater molluscs (23.8%) is characteristic of the fauna of islands. Only one endemic species exhibits a wide distribution range throughout the country while the others have small populations in a few or only one locality. Of the 42 freshwater molluscs of Cuba, 24 species occur within the limits of protected areas. Of these, Tarebia granifera and Physa acuta seem to be the most common snails while the endemics of the genus Hemisinus, Nephronaias, and Viviparus are quite rare in the protected areas, and have scarce populations in Cuba. Of the 253 protected areas in Cuba, only 35 have populations of freshwater molluscs (endemic and non-endemic species). A remarkable point is that 54% of protected areas host introduced species.

Five species of introduced freshwater molluscs occur in Cuba. The main species are the thiarids Tarebia granifera and Melanoides tuberculata (family Thiaridae). Other species are Pomacea diffusa and Marisa cornuarietis (family Ampullariidae), and Corbicula fluminea (family Corbiculidae).

Most of the freshwater mollusc endemic species in Cuba might be endangered or vulnerable. Shrinkage in distribution range of populations, introduction of exotic species, and habitat loss due to human activity are probably the main drivers of population declines. The continuous growth of the Cuban population has forced many populations of endemic molluscs to withdraw from many localities. This has been the result of, first, the construction of buildings near these species populations, which generate an associated pollution of the freshwater environment, and, second, a direct transformation to the ecosystems where the molluscs occur due to water consumption. The Cauto River, the largest river in Cuba, is an example of this transformation with the rerouting of some segments to build dams in order to provide water for the nearby cities. Many recreational infrastructures for tourism have been built in Cuba in the vicinity of areas where endemic freshwater molluscs are found. This is a common problem in places like Viñales, Soroa, Zapata Swamp, and Baracoa, which are among the most important tourist destinations in Cuba.

== Freshwater gastropods ==
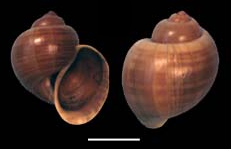
apertural and abapertural view of the shell of endemic Cuban species Pomacea poeyana

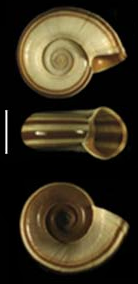
shell of Marisa cornuarietis

Ampullariidae

- Pomacea diffusa Blume, 1957 – introduced, only scarce populations in the western region
- Pomacea poeyana (Pilsbry, 1927) – endemic, well distributed in Cuba
- Marisa cornuarietis (Linnaeus, 1758) – introduced, only scarce populations in the western region

Viviparidae

- Viviparus bermondianus (d'Orbigny, 1842) – endemic in the Zapata Peninsula, it has not been currently found and has perhaps disappeared

Pachychilidae

- Pachychilus nigratus (Poey, 1858) – endemic to Villa Clara
- Pachychilus violaceus (Preston, 1911) – endemic to the area from Santiago de Cuba to Baracoa

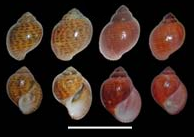
shells of endemic Cuban species Hemisinus brevis

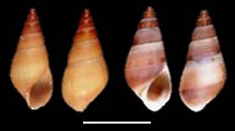
shells of endemic Cuban species Hemisinus cubanianus

Thiaridae

- Hemisinus brevis (d'Orbigny, 1841) – endemic to Pinar del Río, scarce distribution
- Hemisinus cubanianus (d'Orbigny, 1841) – endemic to Pinar del Río, scarce distribution
- Melanoides tuberculata (O. F. Müller, 1774) – introduced and widespread
- Tarebia granifera (Lamarck, 1822) – introduced and widespread. Also with Physella acuta it is the most common freshwater snail in Cuba

Hydrobiidae

- Nanivitrea alcaldei (Jaume & Abbot, 1947) – endemic to Cárdenas, Cuba with one population, this small snail of less than 3 mm have not been currently found and have perhaps disappeared
- Nanivitrea helicoides (Gundlach, 1865) – endemic to Trinidad, Cuba with one population, this small snail of less than 3 mm have not been currently found and have perhaps disappeared

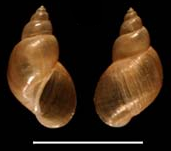
shell of Galba cubensis

Lymnaeidae

- Galba cubensis (Pfeiffer, 1839) – synonym: Fossaria cubensis

Physidae

- Physella acuta (Draparnaud, 1805) – also with Tarebia granifera it is the most common freshwater snail in Cuba

Planorbidae

- Biomphalaria havanensis (L. Pfeiffer, 1839)
- Planorbella duryi (Wetherby, 1879) – synonym: Helisoma duryi
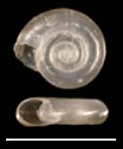
shell of Biomphalaria havanensis

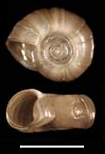
shell of Planorbella duryi

freshwater snails or freshwater bivalve family ?

- B. helophila
- P. parvulus
- B. pallida
- D. lucidum
- D. anatinum
- E. cubensis
- G. radiata
- P. columella
- D. cimex
- G. parvus
- L. manroensis

== Land gastropods ==
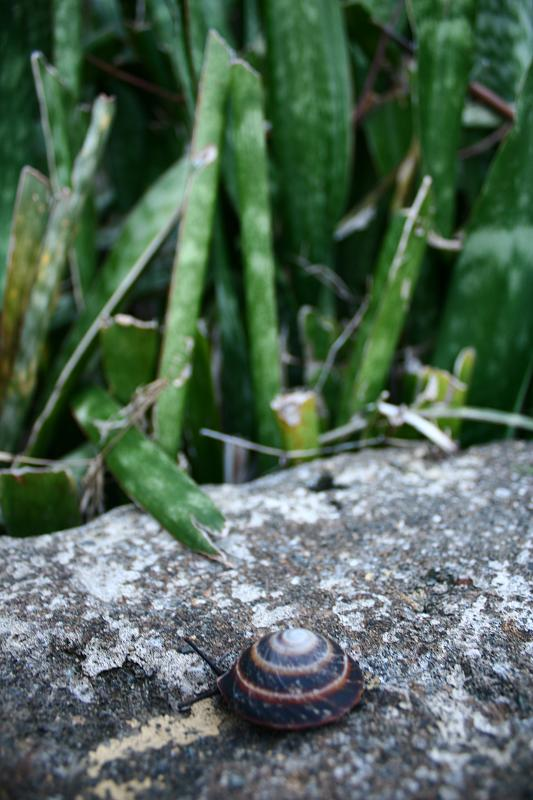
an unidentified land snail from Cuba

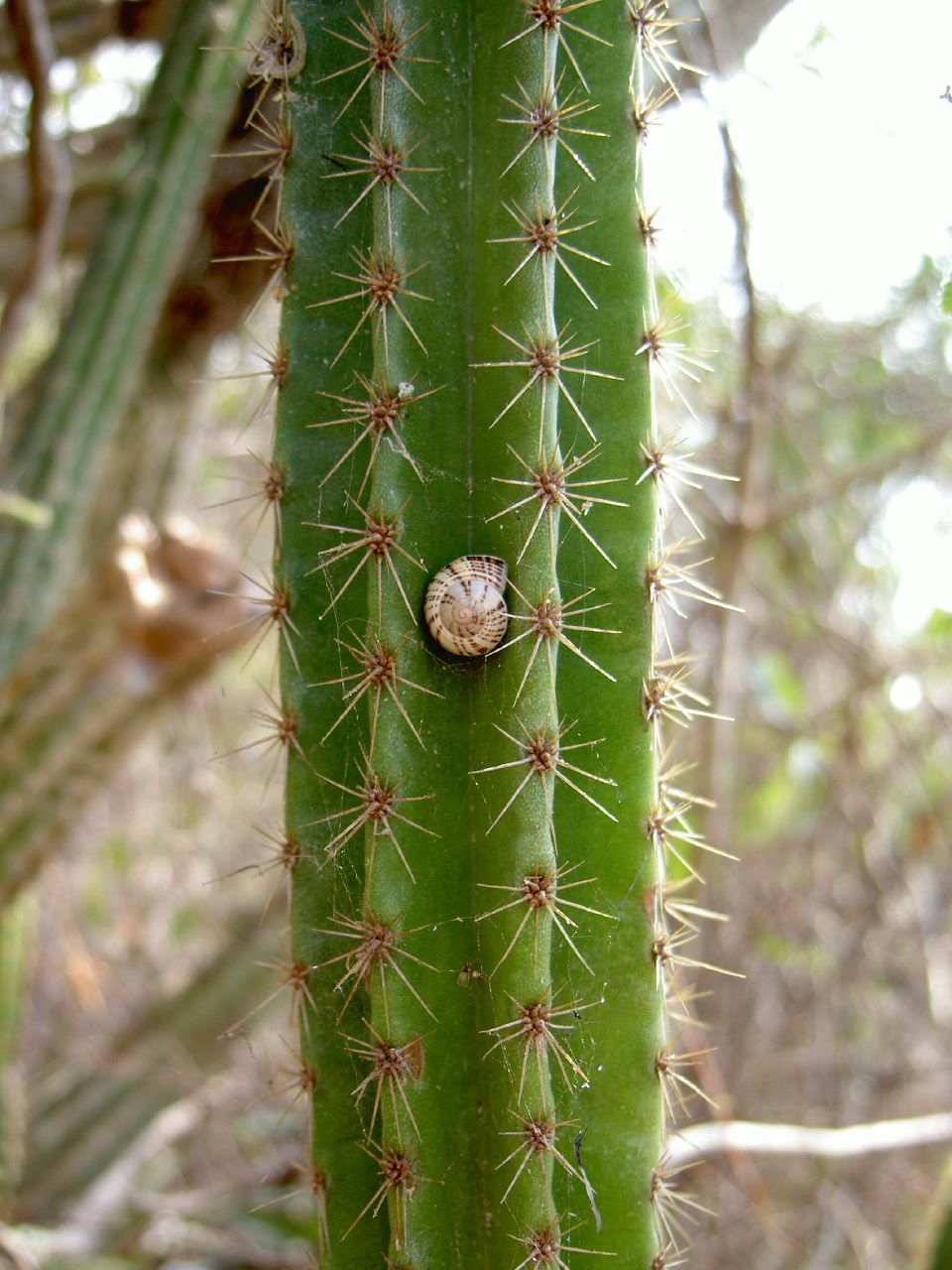
an unidentified land snail from Cuba

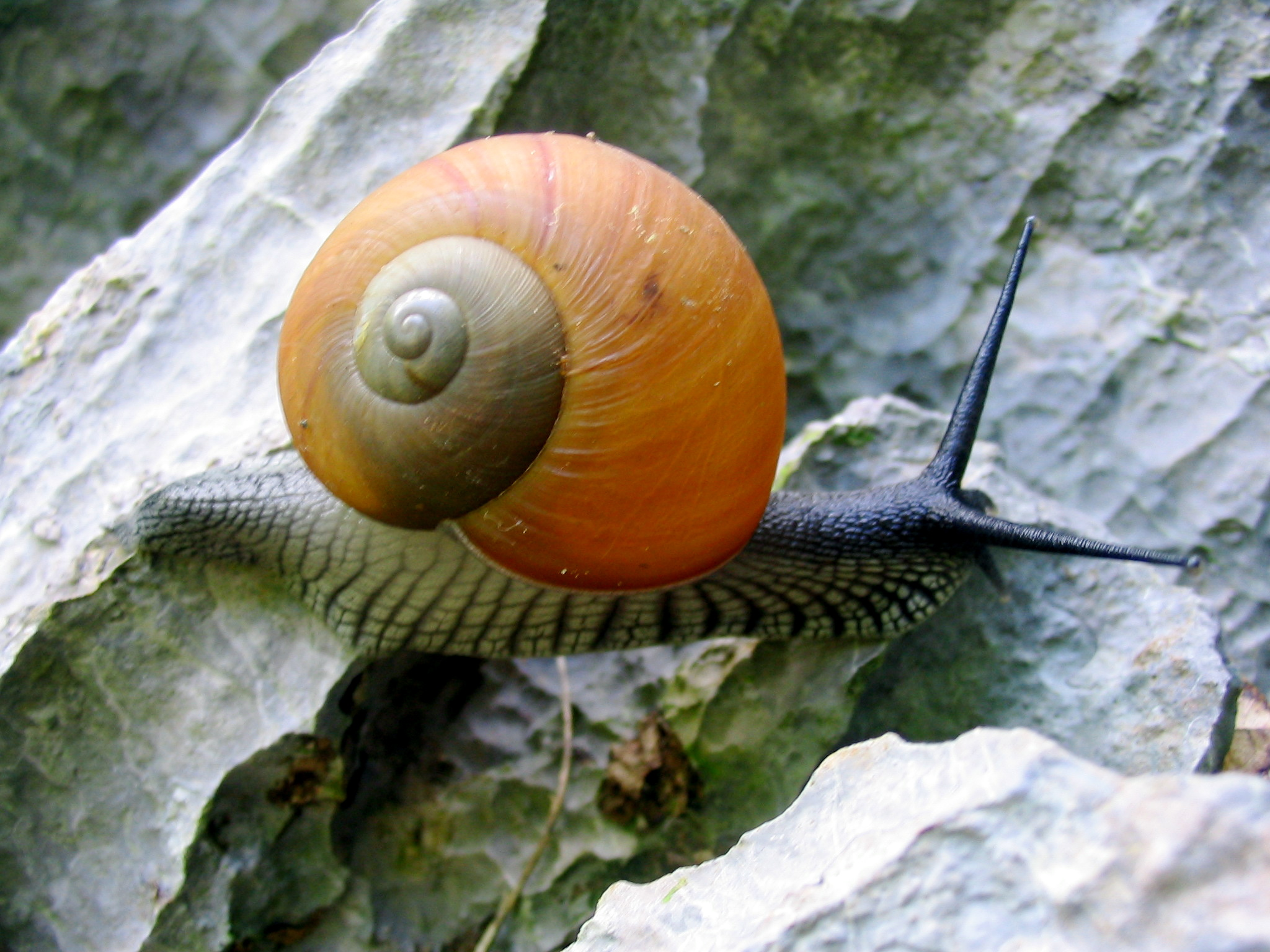
an unidentified land snail from Cuba

There are about 1300 or 1387 species of land gastropods in Cuba.

Land snails have a large degree of endemism and represent almost 94% of the species.

There is enormous number of species in the family Urocoptidae in Cuba, over 580 species.

Helicinidae

- Alcadia bermudezi Aguayo & Jaume, 1957
- Alcadia camagueyana Aguayo & Jaume, 1957
- Alcadia concinna (Gundlach in Pfeiffer, 1857)
- Alcadia dissimulans (Poey, 1858)
- Alcadia euglypta Clench & Aguayo, 1950
- Alcadia gonostoma (Gundlach in Poey, 1858)
- Alcadia hispida (Pfeiffer, 1839)
- Alcadia incrustata (Gundlach in Pfeiffer, 1859)
- Alcadia minima (d'Orbigny, 1842)
- Alcadia neebiana (Pfeiffer, 1862)
- Alcadia nitida (Pfeiffer, 1839)
- Alcadia nuda (Arango in Pfeiffer, 1866)
- Alcadia rotunda (d'Orbigny, 1842)
- Alcadia spectrabilis (Pfeiffer, 1858)
- Alcadia velutina (Poey, 1858)
- Calidviana littoricola (Gundlach in Pfeiffer, 1860)
- Ceratodiscus minimus (Gundlach in Pfeiffer, 1859)
- Emoda bayamensis (Poey, 1854)
- Emoda bermudezi Aguayo & Jaume, 1954
- Emoda blanesi Clench & Aguayo in Aguayo, 1953
- Emoda briarea (Poey, 1851)
- Emoda caledoniensis Clench & Jacobson, 1971
- Emoda ciliata (Poey, 1852)
- Emoda clementis Clench & Aguayo, 1950
- Emoda emoda (Pfeiffer, 1865)
- Emoda mayarina (Poey, 1854)
- Emoda najazaensis Aguayo & Jaume, 1954
- Emoda pulcherrima (Lea, 1834)
- Emoda sagraiana (d'Orbigny, 1842)
- Emoda silacea (Morelet, 1849)
- Emoda submarginata (Gray, 1824)
- Glyptemoda torrei Henderson, 1909
- Helicina adspersa Pfeiffer, 1839 or Helicina aspersa
- Helicina declivis Gundlach in Pfeiffer, 1860
- Helicina globulosa d'Orbigny, 1842
- Helicina holguinensis Clench & Aguayo, 1953
- Helicina lembeyana Poey, 1854
- Helicina monteiberia Sarasúa, 1976
- Helicina poeyi Pfeiffer, 1859
- Helicina reeveana Pfeiffer, 1848
- Helicina subdepressa Poey, 1854
- Helicina subglobulosa Poey, 1852
- Lucidella granulum (Gundlach in Pfeiffer, 1864)
- Lucidella granum (Pfeiffer, 1856)
- Lucidella rugosa (Pfeiffer, 1839)
- Lucidella tantilla (Pilsbry, 1902)
- Priotrochatella constellata (Morelet, 1847)
- Priotrochatella stellata (Velazquez in Poey, 1852)
- Priotrochatella torrei Clapp, 1918
- Semitrochatella alboviridis (Wright in Pfeiffer, 1864)
- Semitrochatella babei (Arango, 1876)
- Semitrochatella conica (Pfeiffer, 1839)
- Semitrochatella elongata (d'Orbigny, 1842)
- Semitrochatella fuscula (Gundlach in Pfeiffer, 1863)
- Troschelviana callosa (Poey, 1854)
- Troschelviana chrysochasma (Poey, 1853)
- Troschelviana continua (Gundlach in Pfeiffer, 1858)
- Troschelviana erythracea (Wright in Sowerby, 1866)
- Troschelviana granulum (Gundlach in Pfeiffer, 1864)
- Troschelviana hians (Poey, 1852)
- Troschelviana holguinensis (Aguayo, 1932)
- Troschelviana jugulata (Poey, 1858)
- Troschelviana mestrei (Arango, 1879)
- Troschelviana methfesseli (Pfeiffer, 1862)
- Troschelviana petitiana (d'Orbigny, 1842)
- Troschelviana pfeifferiana (Arango in Pfeiffer, 1866)
- Troschelviana pyramidalis (Sowerby, 1842)
- Troschelviana rubromarginata (Gundlach in Poey, 1858)
- Troschelviana rupestris (Pfeiffer, 1839)
- Troschelviana scopulorum (Morelet, 1849)
- Troschelviana spinipoma (Aguayo, 1943)
- Troschelviana tumidula (Clench & Aguayo, 1957)
- Ustronia acuminata (Velazquez in Poey, 1852)
- Ustronia sloanei (d'Orbigny, 1842)
- Viana regina (Morelet, 1849)

Proserpinidae

- Proserpina depresa (d'Orbigny, 1842)
- Proserpina globulosa (d'Orbigny, 1842)

Megalomastomatidae

- Farcimen alutaceum (Menke in Pfeiffer, 1846)
- Farcimen arangoi Torre & Bartsch, 1942
- Farcimen auriculatum (d'Orbigny, 1842)
- Farcimen bartschi Alcalde, 1945
- Farcimen bilabiatum Alcalde, 1945
- Farcimen bituberculatum (Sowerby, 1850)
- Farcimen camagueyanum Torre & Bartsch, 1942
- Farcimen cisnerosi Alcalde, 1945
- Farcimen guanense Torre & Bartsch, 1942
- Farcimen guitarti Torre & Bartsch, 1942
- Farcimen gundlachi (Pfeiffer, 1856)
- Farcimen hendersoni Torre & Bartsch, 1942
- Farcimen imperator Alcalde, 1945
- Farcimen jaumei Alcalde, 1945
- Farcimen leoninum (Pfeiffer, 1856)
- Farcimen magister Torre & Bartsch, 1942
- Farcimen majusculum Alcalde, 1945
- Farcimen mani (Poey, 1851)
- Farcimen najazaense Torre & Bartsch, 1942
- Farcimen obesum Torre & Bartsch, 1942
- Farcimen procer (Poey, 1854)
- Farcimen pseudotortum Torre & Bartsch, 1942
- Farcimen rocai Torre & Bartsch, 1942
- Farcimen seminudum (Poey, 1854)
- Farcimen subventricosum Torre & Bartsch, 1942
- Farcimen superbum Torre & Bartsch, 1942
- Farcimen torrei (Guitart, 1936)
- Farcimen tortum (Wood, 1828)
- Farcimen ungula (Poey, 1856)
- Farcimen ventricosum (d'Orbigny, 1842)
- Farcimen vignalense Torre & Bartsch, 1942
- Farcimen wrighti Torre & Bartsch, 1942
- Farcimen yunquense Torre & Bartsch, 1942

Neocyclotidae

- Crocidopoma gunglachi Torre & Bartsch, 1942
- Crocidopoma perdistinctum (Gundlach, 1858)

Pomatiidae

- Annularisca aberrans Torre & Barsch, 1941
- Annularisca alata (Pfeiffer, 1851)
- Annularisca alayoi (Jaume, 1984)
- Annularisca armasi (Jaume, 1984)
- Annularisca arquesi Torre & Bartsch, 1941
- Annularisca auricoma (Gundlach in Pfeiffer, 1859)
- Annularisca borroi (Jaume, 1984)
- Annularisca cumulata (Pfeiffer, 1863)
- Annularisca eburnea (Gundlach in Pfeiffer, 1858)
- Annularisca fragilis (Gundlach in Pfeiffer, 1859)
- Annularisca hendersoni Torre & Bartsch, 1941
- Annularisca heynemanni (Pfeiffer, 1864)
- Annularisca holguinensis Torre & Bartsch, 1941
- Annularisca incerta Torre & Bartsch, 1941
- Annularisca intercisa Torre & Bartsch, 1941
- Annularisca interstitialis (Gundlach in Pfeiffer, 1859)
- Annularisca mackinlayi (Gundlach in Pfeiffer, 1859)
- Annularisca mayariensis Torre & Bartsch, 1941
- Annularisca mayensis Torre & Bartsch, 1941
- Annularisca pallens Torre & Bartsch, 1941
- Annularisca prestoni (Ramsden, 1914)
- Annularisca pseudalata (Torre in Pilsbry & Henderson, 1912)
- Annularisca ramsdeni (Pilsbry & Henderson, 1912)
- Annularisca romeri (Pfeiffer, 1864)
- Annularisca tacrensis Torre & Bartsch, 1941
- Annularisca toroensis Torre & Bartsch, 1941
- Annularisca torrebartschi (Jaume,1984)
- Annularisca victoris Torre & Bartsch, 1941
- Annularisca wrighti Torre & Bartsch, 1941
- Annularisca yaterasensis (Pfeiffer, 1865)
- Annularisca yumuriensis Torre & Bartsch, 1941
- Annularisca yunquensis (Pfeiffer, 1860)
- Annularita majuscula (Morelet, 1851)
- Annularodes boqueronensis (Torre & Bartsch, 1941)
- Annularodes canoaensis (Torre & Bartsch, 1941)
- Annularodes cantarillensis (Torre & Bartsch, 1941)
- Annularodes indivisa (Welch, 1929)
- Annularodes inquisita (Pilsbry, 1929)
- Annularodes morenoi (Torre & Bartsch, 1941)
- Annularodes obsoleta (Torre & Bartsch, 1941)
- Annularodes perezi (Torre & Bartsch, 1941)
- Annularodes pilsbryi (Welch, 1929)
- Annularodes terneroensis (Torre & Bartsch, 1941)
- Annularodes unicinata (Arango, 1884)
- Annularops attenuata (Torre & Bartsch, 1941)
- Annularops blaini (Gundlach in Pfeiffer, 1863)
- Annularops coronadoi (Arango in Poey, 1867)
- Annularops perplexa (Torre & Bartsch, 1941)
- Annularops sauvallei (Gundlach in Pfeiffer, 1863)
- Annularops semicana (Morelet, 1851)
- Annularops tryoni (Arango, 1879)
- Annularops vannostrandi (Arango, 1876)
- Bermudezia bermudezi (Torre & Bartsch, 1941)
- Bermudezia biayensis (Torre & Bartsch, 1941)
- Bermudezia capestanyi (Torre & Bartsch, 1941)
- Bermudezia euglypta (Torre & Bartsch, 1941)
- Bermudezia eurystoma (Torre & Bartsch, 1941)
- Bermudezia lirata (Torre & Bartsch, 1941)
- Bermudezia najazaensis (Torre & Bartsch, 1941)
- Bermudezia obliterata (Torre & Bartsch, 1941)
- Bermudezia payroli (Torre & Bartsch, 1941)
- Bermudezia sifontesi (Torre & Bartsch, 1941)
- Blaesospira echinus (Wright in Pfeiffer, 1864)
- Blaesospira hortensiae Jaume, 1984
- Cubadamsiella beneitoi Fernández-Garcés, Espinosa & Ortea, 2003
- Cubadamsiella gratiosa (Torre & Bartsch, 1941)
- Cubadamsiella lamellata (Alcalde, 1945)
- Cubadamsiella lamellata Alcalde, 1945
- Cubadamsiella leoni (Torre & Bartsch, 1941)
- Cubadamsiella procax (Poey, 1851)
- Chondropoma abnatum (Gundlach in Pfeiffer, 1858)
- Chondropoma abtianum (Pfeiffer, 1862)
- Chondropoma aguayoi Torre & Bartsch, 1938
- Chondropoma alayoi Aguayo & Jaume, 1957
- Chondropoma alberti Clench & Aguayo, 1948
- Chondropoma alcaldei Jaume & Sánchez de Fuentes, 1943
- Chondropoma antonense Torre & Bartsch, 1938
- Chondropoma asperulum Aguayo, 1934
- Chondropoma auberianum (d'Orbigny, 1842)
- Chondropoma bairense Torre & Bartsch, 1938
- Chondropoma cabrerai Torre & Bartsch, 1938
- Chondropoma carenasense Pilsbry & Henderson, 1912
- Chondropoma cleti Aguayo, 1939
- Chondropoma cognatum Torre & Bartsch, 1938
- Chondropoma confertum (Poey, 1852)
- Chondropoma chordatum (Gundlach in Pfeiffer, 1858)
- Chondropoma daudinoti (Gundlach in Pfeiffer, 1860)
- Chondropoma delatreanum (d'Orbigny, 1842)
- Chondropoma dilatatum (Gundlach in Pfeiffer, 1859)
- Chondropoma eduardoi Aguayo, 1934
- Chondropoma erectum (Gundlach in Pfeiffer, 1858)
- Chondropoma ernesti Pfeiffer, 1862
- Chondropoma fuentesi Jaume & Alcalde, 1944
- Chondropoma garcianum Torre, 1913
- Chondropoma greenfieldi Torre & Bartsch, 1938
- Chondropoma guisaense Torre & Bartsch, 1938
- Chondropoma gutierrezi (Gundlach in Pfeiffer, 1856)
- Chondropoma holguinense (Aguayo, 1944)
- Chondropoma irradians (Shuttleworth in Pfeiffer, 1852)
- Chondropoma jaulense Torre & Bartsch, 1938
- Chondropoma laetum (Gutierrez in Poey, 1858)
- Chondropoma latum (Gundlach in Pfeiffer, 1858)
- Chondropoma lembeyi Torre & Bartsch, 1938
- Chondropoma leoni Torre & Bartsch, 1938
- Chondropoma marginalbum (Gundlach in Pfeiffer, 1859)
- Chondropoma mimetica (Torre & Bartsch, 1941)
- Chondropoma moestum (Shuttleworth in Pfeiffer, 1854)
- Chondropoma montanum Torre & Bartsch, 1938
- Chondropoma neglectum (Gundlach in Pfeiffer, 1856)
- Chondropoma nicolasi Torre & Bartsch, 1938
- Chondropoma nigriculum (Gundlach, 1860)
- Chondropoma obesum (Menke, 1830)
- Chondropoma oxytremum (Gundlach in Pfeiffer, 1860)
- Chondropoma perlatum (Gundlach in Poey,1858)
- Chondropoma pfeifferi Aguayo, 1945
- Chondropoma pfeifferianum (Poey, 1851)
- Chondropoma pictum (Pfeiffer, 1839)
- Chondropoma poeyanum (Orbigny, 1842)
- Chondropoma portuandoi Torre & Bartsch, 1938
- Chondropoma presasianum (Gundlach, 1863)
- Chondropoma revinctum (Poey, 1851)
- Chondropoma revocatum (Gundlach in Pfeiffer, 1857)
- Chondropoma rolandoi Aguayo, 1943
- Chondropoma rufopictum (Gundlach in Pfeiffer, 1860)
- Chondropoma solidulum (Gundlach in Pfeiffer, 1860)
- Chondropoma tejedori Clench & Aguayo, 1946
- Chondropoma tenuisculptum Aguayo, 1939
- Chondropoma textum (Gundlach in Pfeiffer, 1858)
- Chondropoma unilabiatum (Gundlach in Pfeiffer, 1860)
- Chondropoma vespertinum (Morelet, 1851)
- Chondropoma virgineum Aguayo, 1953
- Chondropoma wilcoxi Pilsbry & Henderson, 1912
- Chondropoma wrighti (Pfeiffer, 1862)
- Chondropoma yucayum (Presas in Pfeiffer, 1863)
- Chondropoma zorrillae Jaume, 1984
- Chondropometes bellisimum Torre & Bartsch, 1938
- Chondropometes concolor Torre & Bartsch, 1938
- Chondropometes eximium Torre & Bartsch, 1938
- Chondropometes exquisitum Torre & Bartsch, 1938
- Chondropometes latilabre (d'Orbigny, 1842)
- Chondropometes magnum Torre & Bartsch, 1938
- Chondropometes saccharinum Torre & Bartsch, 1938
- Chondropometes sagebieni (Poey, 1858)
- Chondropometes scopulorum Torre & Bartsch, 1938
- Chondropometes segregatum Torre & Bartsch, 1938
- Chondropometes torrei Bartsch, 1937
- Chondropometes vignalense (Wright in Pfeiffer, 1863)
- Chondrothyra affinis (Torre & Bartsch, 1938)
- Chondrothyra atristoma Torre & Bartsch, 1938
- Chondrothyra barbouri (Torre & Bartsch, 1938)
- Chondrothyra cerina (Torre & Bartsch, 1938)
- Chondrothyra crassa Torre & Bartsch, 1938
- Chondrothyra cumbrensis Torre & Bartsch, 1938
- Chondrothyra detectabilis (Torre & Bartsch, 1938)
- Chondrothyra egregia (Gundlach in Pfeiffer, 1856)
- Chondrothyra foveata (Gundlach in Pfeiffer, 1863)
- Chondrothyra gundlachi (Arango, 1862)
- Chondrothyra impresa (Torre & Bartsch, 1938)
- Chondrothyra incrassata (Wright in Pfeiffer, 1862)
- Chondrothyra natensoni Torre & Bartsch, 1938
- Chondrothyra parilis (Torre & Bartsch, 1938)
- Chondrothyra percrassa (Wright in Pfeiffer, 1864)
- Chondrothyra reticulata (Torre & Bartsch, 1938)
- Chondrothyra rutila Torre & Bartsch, 1938
- Chondrothyra shuttleworthi (Pfeiffer, 1851)
- Chondrothyra subegregia Torre & Bartsch, 1938
- Chondrothyra tenebrata (Torre & Bartsch, 1938)
- Chondrothyra tosta Torre & Bartsch, 1938
- Chondrothyra uniplicata Torre & Bartsch, 1938
- Chondrothyra wrighti Torre & Bartsch, 1938
- Chondrothyrella assimilis (Gundlach in Pfeiffer, 1863)
- Chondrothyrella claudicans (Poey, 1851)
- Chondrothyrella cuzcoensis Torre & Bartsch, 1938
- Chondrothyrella excisa (Gundlach in Pfeiffer, 1863)
- Chondrothyrella ottonis (Pfeiffer, 1846)
- Chondrothyrella paredonis Sánchez Roig, 1951
- Chondrothyrella perturbata Torre & Bartsch, 1938
- Chondrothyrella petricosa (Morelet, 1851)
- Chondrothyrella pudica (d'Orbigny, 1842)
- Chondrothyrella tenebrosa (Morelet, 1849)
- Chondrothyrium alcaldei Jaume & Sánchez de Fuentes, 1943
- Chondrothyrium borroi Jaume & Sánchez de Fuentes, 1943
- Chondrothyrium crenimargo (Pfeiffer, 1858)
- Chondrothyrium mortiarum Sánchez Roig, 1951
- Chondrothyrium tejedori Sánchez Roig, 1951
- Chondrothyrium torrei Jaume & Sánchez de Fuentes, 1943
- Chondrothyrium violaceum (Pfeiffer, 1858)
- Dallsiphona dalli (Torre & Henderson, 1920)
- Diploma arangoi (Jaume, 1984)
- Diploma architectonica (Gundlach in Pfeiffer, 1859)
- Diploma songoensis (Torre & Bartsch, 1941)
- Diploma torrei (Ramsden, 1915)
- Diploma varonai (Jaume, 1984)
- Diploma zayasi (Jaume, 1984)
- Eutudora agassizi (Charpentier in Pfeiffer, 1852)
- Eutudora cabrerai (Torre & Bartsch, 1941)
- Eutudora camoensis (Torre & Bartsch, 1941)
- Eutudora catenata (Gould, 1843)
- Eutudora jimenoi (Arango in Pfeiffer, 1864)
- Eutudora limbifera (Menke in Pfeiffer, 1846)
- Eutudora transitoria (Torre & Bartsch, 1941)
- Eutudorops complanata (Torre & Bartsch, 1941)
- Eutudorops pulverulenta (Wright in Pfeiffer, 1864)
- Eutudorops rocai (Torre & Bartsch, 1941)
- Eutudorops rotundata (Poey, 1851)
- Eutudorops torquata (Gutierrez in Poey, 1858)
- Eutudorops troscheli (Pfeiffer, 1864)
- Eutudorops undosa (Gundlach in Pfeiffer, 1863)
- Eutudorops welchi (Torre et Bartsch, 1941)
- Guajaibona petrei (d'Orbigny, 1842)
- Gundlachtudora decolorata (Gundlach in Pfeiffer, 1859)
- Hendersonina bermudezi Torre & Bartsch, 1938
- Hendersonina canaliculata (Gundlach in Pfeiffer, 1863)
- Hendersonina cirrata (Wright in Pfeiffer, 1867)
- Hendersonina deceptor (Arango, 1882)
- Hendersonina discolorans (Wright in Pfeiffer, 1863)
- Hendersonina echinulata (Wright in Pfeiffer, 1863)
- Hendersonina hamlini (Arango, 1882)
- Hendersonina hendersoni (Torre, 1909)
- Hendersonina maculata Torre & Bartsch, 1938
- Hendersonina mendax (Torre & Bartsch, 1938)
- Hendersonina scobina (Gundlach in Pfeiffer, 1863)
- Hendersonina sinuosa (Wright in Pfeiffer, 1862)
- Jaumeia notata (Torre & Bartsch, 1941)
- Juannularia arguta (Pfeiffer, 1858)
- Juannularia perplicata (Gundlach, 1857)
- Limadora garciana (Aguayo, 1932)
- Limadora scabrata (Torre & Bartsch, 1941)
- Limadora tollini (Ramsden, 1915)
- Limadorex limonensis (Torre & Bartsch, 1941)
- Opisthocoelicum dubium Sánchez Roig, 1949
- Opisthocoelicum excurrens (Gundlach in Pfeiffer, 1860)
- Opisthocoelicum lamellicostatum (Torre & Henderson, 1921)
- Opisthocoelicum occultum (Torre & Henderson, 1921)
- Opisthocoelicum opisthocoele Torre & Bartsch, 1941
- Opisthocoelicum paradoxum (Torre & Henderson, 1921)
- Opisthocoelicum simulans Torre & Bartsch, 1941
- Opisthosiphon aguilerianum (Arango, 1876)
- Opisthosiphon andrewsi Welch, 1929
- Opisthosiphon apertum Torre & Henderson, 1920
- Opisthosiphon bacillum Torre & Bartsch, 1941
- Opisthosiphon banaoense Torre & Henderson, 1921
- Opisthosiphon bermudezi Torre & Bartsch, 1941
- Opisthosiphon berryi Clapp, 1919
- Opisthosiphon bioscai Torre & Henderson, 1920
- Opisthosiphon caguanense Torre & Bartsch, 1941
- Opisthosiphon caroli Aguayo, 1932
- Opisthosiphon claudens Torre & Bartsch, 1941
- Opisthosiphon cucullatum Torre & Bartsch, 1941
- Opisthosiphon cunaguae Welch, 1929
- Opisthosiphon detectum Torre & Henderson, 1920
- Opisthosiphon deviatum Torre & Bartsch, 1941
- Opisthosiphon echinatum (Gundlach in Pfeiffer, 1857)
- Opisthosiphon evanidum Torre & Henderson, 1921
- Opisthosiphon greenfieldi Torre & Bartsch, 1941
- Opisthosiphon guanajaense Torre & Bartsch, 1941
- Opisthosiphon insularum Torre & Bartsch, 1941
- Opisthosiphon judasense Torre & Henderson, 1920
- Opisthosiphon lamellosum Torre & Bartsch, 1941
- Opisthosiphon litorale Torre & Bartsch, 1941
- Opisthosiphon manatiense Torre & Bartsch, 1941
- Opisthosiphon moreletianum (Petit, 1850)
- Opisthosiphon obtectum Torre & Henderson, 1920
- Opisthosiphon obturatum Torre & Henderson, 1920
- Opisthosiphon palmeri Torre & Bartsch, 1941
- Opisthosiphon paredonense Torre & Henderson, 1920
- Opisthosiphon plateroense Torre & Bartsch, 1941
- Opisthosiphon plicatum Torre & Bartsch, 1941
- Opisthosiphon poeyi Torre & Bartsch, 1941
- Opisthosiphon prominulum Torre & Bartsch, 1941
- Opisthosiphon protactum Torre & Henderson, 1920
- Opisthosiphon pupoides (Morelet, 1849)
- Opisthosiphon quesadai Aguayo, 1932
- Opisthosiphon quinti Torre & Bartsch, 1941
- Opisthosiphon sabinalense Sánchez Roig, 1949
- Opisthosiphon sainzi Aguayo, 1934
- Opisthosiphon salustii Torre & Henderson, 1920
- Opisthosiphon sanchezi Torre & Bartsch, 1941
- Opisthosiphon sculptum (Gundlach in Pfeiffer, 1857)
- Opisthosiphon sosai Torre & Bartsch, 1941
- Opisthosiphon subobtectum Torre & Bartsch, 1941
- Opisthosiphon subobturatum Torre & Henderson, 1920
- Opisthosiphon tersum Torre & Henderson, 1921
- Opisthosiphon torrei Welch, 1929
- Opisthosiphon turiguanoense Torre & Bartsch, 1941
- Opistosiphon conicus Aguayo & Sánchez Roig, 1949
- Ramsdenia bufo (Pfeiffer, 1864)
- Ramsdenia natensoni (Torre & Bartsch, 1941)
- Ramsdenia nobilitata (Gundlach in Poey, 1858)
- Ramsdenia perspectiva (Gundlach in Pfeiffer, 1859)
- Rhytidopoma clathratum (Gould, 1842)
- Rhytidopoma coronatum (Poey in Pfeiffer, 1856)
- Rhytidopoma hespericum Torre & Bartsch, 1941
- Rhytidopoma honestum (Poey, 1851)
- Rhytidopoma immersa (Gundlach in Pfeiffer, 1857)
- Rhytidopoma isabelae Aguayo & Jaume, 1953
- Rhytidopoma nodulatum (Poey, 1851)
- Rhytidopoma occidentale Torre & Bartsch, 1941
- Rhytidopoma pinense Torre & Bartsch, 1941
- Rhytidopoma rugulosum (Pfeiffer, 1839)
- Rhytidopoma scalarinum Jaume & Sánchez de Fuentes, 1944
- Rhytidopoma violaceum Jaume & Sánchez de Fuentes, 1944
- Rhytidopoma wrightianum (Gundlach in Arango, 1881)
- Rhytidothyra bilabiata (d'Orbigny, 1842)
- Rhytidothyra jacobsoni Alcalde, 1948
- Subannularia jeannereti (Pfeiffer, 1861)
- Subannularia lacheri (Pfeiffer, 1861)
- Subannularia pujalsi Aguayo, 1953
- Subannularia storchi (Pfeiffer, 1861)
- Torrella deficiens (Gundlach in Pfeiffer, 1857)
- Torrella simpsoni Henderson & Bartsch, 1920
- Torrilla emmae Jaume & Sánchez de Fuentes, 1943
- Torrilla torreiana (Gundlach in Arango, 1878)
- Torrilla trinidadensis Torre & Bartsch, 1941
- Troschelvindex agrestis (Pfeiffer, 1862)
- Troschelvindex alayoi Aguayo & Jaume, 1947
- Troschelvindex arangiana (Gundlach in Pfeiffer, 1857
- Troschelvindex auriflexum Aguayo, 1953
- Troschelvindex barbouri (Torre & Bartsch, 1941)
- Troschelvindex bebini (Arango, 1865)
- Troschelvindex candeana (d'Orbigny, 1842)
- Troschelvindex freirei Aguayo & Jaume, 1947
- Troschelvindex inculta (Poey, 1851)
- Troschelvindex jiguanensis (Pfeiffer, 1861)
- Troschelvindex minia (Gundlach in Poey, 1858)
- Troschelvindex rocai (Torre & Bartsch, 1941)
- Troschelvindex tracta (Gundlach in Poey, 1858)
- Tudorina rangelina (Poey, 1851)
- Wrightudora aguayoi (Torre & Bartsch, 1941)
- Wrightudora arcticoronata (Torre & Bartsch, 1941)
- Wrightudora asperata (Torre & Bartsch, 1941)
- Wrightudora banensis Aguayo, 1944
- Wrightudora bermudezi (Torre & Bartsch, 1941)
- Wrightudora clenchi Aguayo & Jaume, 1954
- Wrightudora crassiuscula (Torre & Bartsch, 1941)
- Wrightudora cristata (Torre & Bartsch, 1941)
- Wrightudora enode (Gundlach in Pfeiffer, 1860)
- Wrightudora garridoiana (Gundlach in Pfeiffer, 1860)
- Wrightudora gibarana Aguayo, 1943
- Wrightudora gundlachi (Torre & Bartsch, 1941)
- Wrightudora laevistria Aguayo & Sánchez Roig, 1949
- Wrightudora obesa (Torre & Bartsch, 1941)
- Wrightudora recta (Gundlach in Pfeiffer, 1863)
- Wrightudora semicoronata (Gundlach in Pfeiffer, 1861)
- Wrightudora suavis (Torre & Bartsch, 1941)
- Wrightudora tuberculata (Torre & Bartsch, 1941)
- Wrightudora varicosa (Torre & Bartsch, 1941)
- Xenophoma aguayoi Torre & Bartsch, 1941
- Xenophoma hendersoni Torre & Bartsch, 1941
- Xenophoma humboldtianum (Pfeiffer, 1867)
- Xenophoma hystrix (Wright in Pfeiffer, 1862)
- Xenophoma spinosissimum Torre & Bartsch, 1941
- Xenopoides delicatulum Torre & Bartsch, 1941

Truncatellidae

- Taheitia elongata (Poey in Pfeiffer, 1856)
- Taheitia filicosta (Gundlach in Poey, 1858)
- Taheitia lirata (Poey, 1858)
- Taheitia wrighti (Pfeiffer, 1862)
- Truncatella caribaeensis Reeve, 1826
- Truncatella pulchella Pfeiffer, 1839
- Truncatella scalarina (Michaud, 1830)

Veronicellidae

- Leidyula floridana (Leidy & Binney in Binney, 1851)
- Sarasinula plebeia (Fisher, 1868)
- Veronicella cubense (Pfeiffer, 1840) or Veronicella cubensis (Pfeiffer, 1840)
- Veronicella sloanii (Cuvier, 1817)
- Veronicella tenax Baker, 1931

Succineidae

- Succinea angustior (C. B. Adams, 1850)
- Succinea arangoi Pfeiffer, 1866
- Succinea aurea Lea, 1841
- Succinea brevis Dunker in Pfeiffer, 1850
- Succinea fulgens Lea, 1841
- Succinea gundlachi Pfeiffer, 1852
- Succinea macta Poey, 1858
- Succinea nobilis Poey, 1853
- Succinea ochracina Gundlach in Poey, 1858
- Succinea sagra d'Orbigny, 1842
- Succinea tenuis Gundlach in Poey, 1858

Pupillidae

- Pupoides albilabris nitidulus (Pfeiffer, 1839)

Strobilopsidae

- Discostrobilops hubbardi (A. D. Brown, 1861)

Vertiginidae

- Bothriopupa tenuidens (C. B. Adams, 1845)
- Gastrocopta barbadensis (Pfeiffer, 1853)
- Gastrocopta contracta (Say, 1822)
- Gastrocopta pellucida (Pfeiffer, 1840)
- Gastrocopta rupicola marginalba (Pfeiffer, 1840)
- Gastrocopta servilis (Gould, 1843)
- Pupisoma dioscoricola (C. B. Adams, 1845)
- Sterkia antillensis Pilsbry, 1920
- Vertigo cubana Crosse, 1890
- Vertigo gouldii (Binney, 1843)
- Vertigo milium (Gould, 1840)
- Vertigo neglecta Arango in Poey, 1856
- Vertigo ovata (Say, 1822)
- Vertigo torrei Aguayo & Jaume, 1934

Orthalicidae

- Bulimulus sepulchralis Poey, 1852
- Drymaeus dominicus (Reeve, 1850)
- Liguus blainianus (Poey, 1851)
- Liguus fasciatus (Müller, 1774)
- Liguus flammellus Clench, 1934
- Liguus vittatus (Swainson, 1822)

Cerionidae

- Cerion acuticostatum Sánchez Roig, 1948
- Cerion aguayoi Torre & Clench, 1932
- Cerion alberti Clench & Aguayo, 1949
- Cerion alleni Torre, 1929
- Cerion arangoi (Pilsbry & Vanatta, 1896)
- Cerion banesense Clench & Aguayo, 1949
- Cerion barroi Aguayo & Jaume, 1957
- Cerion basistriatum Pilsbry & Vanatta, 1895
- Cerion bioscai Aguayo & Jaume, 1951
- Cerion blanesi Clench & Aguayo, 1951
- Cerion cabocruzense Pilsbry & Torre, 1943
- Cerion caroli Aguayo & Torre, 1951
- Cerion catherwoodianum Wurtz, 1950
- Cerion ceiba Clench, 1948
- Cerion chaparra Aguayo & Sánchez Roig, 1953
- Cerion chaplini Wurtz, 1950
- Cerion circumscriptum Aguayo & Jaume, 1951
- Cerion cisneroi Clench & Aguayo, 1951
- Cerion cobarrubia Aguayo & Jaume, 1951
- Cerion columbinus Sánchez Roig, 1951
- Cerion coutini Sánchez Roig, 1951
- Cerion crassiusculum Torre in Pilsbry & Vanatta, 1899
- Cerion cyclostomum (Küster, 1841)
- Cerion dimidiatum (Pfeiffer, 1847)
- Cerion disforme Clench & Aguayo, 1946
- Cerion dorotheae Aguayo & Jaume, 1951
- Cerion ebriolum Aguayo & Jaume, 1951
- Cerion feltoni Sánchez Roig, 1951
- Cerion geophilum Clench & Aguayo, 1949
- Cerion grilloensis Sánchez Roig, 1951
- Cerion gundlachi (Pfeiffer, 1852)
- Cerion herrerai Aguayo & Jaume, 1951
- Cerion hessei Clench & Aguayo, 1949
- Cerion humberti Clench & Aguayo, 1949
- Cerion hyperlissum Pilsbry & Vanatta, 1896
- Cerion incrassatum (Sowerby, 1876)
- Cerion infandulum Aguayo & Torre, 1951
- Cerion infandum (Shuttleworth in Poey, 1858)
- Cerion iostomum (Pfeiffer, 1854)
- Cerion johnsoni Pilsbry & Vanatta, 1895
- Cerion josephi Clench & Aguayo, 1949
- Cerion kusteri (Pfeiffer, 1854)
- Cerion laureani Clench & Aguayo, 1951
- Cerion longidens Pilsbry, 1902
- Cerion macrodon Aguayo & Jaume, 1951
- Cerion magister Pilsbry & Vanatta, 1896
- Cerion manatiense Aguayo & Jaume, 1951
- Cerion marielinum Torre in Pilsbry, 1927
- Cerion maritimum (Pfeiffer, 1839)
- Cerion microdon Pilsbry & Vanatta, 1896
- Cerion microstonum [or microstomum] (Pfeiffer, 1854)
- Cerion miramarae Sánchez Roig, 1951
- Cerion multicostum (Küster, 1845)
- Cerion mumia (Bruguiére, 1792)
- Cerion mumiola (Pfeiffer, 1839)
- Cerion nipense Aguayo, 1953
- Cerion orientale Clench & Aguayo, 1951
- Cerion palmeri Sánchez Roig, 1948
- Cerion pandionis Aguayo & Jaume, 1951
- Cerion paredonis Pilsbry, 1902
- Cerion pastelilloensis Sánchez Roig, 1951
- Cerion paucicostatum Torre, 1929
- Cerion paucisculptum Clench & Aguayo, 1952
- Cerion peracutum Clench & Aguayo, 1951
- Cerion pinerium Dall, 1895
- Cerion politum (Maynard, 1896)
- Cerion prestoni Sánchez Roig, 1951
- Cerion pretiosus Sánchez Roig, 1951
- Cerion pseudocyclostomum Aguayo & Sánchez Roig, 1953
- Cerion ramsdeni Torre in Welch, 1934
- Cerion ricardi Clench & Aguayo, 1951
- Cerion saetiae Sánchez Roig, 1948
- Cerion sagraianum (Pfeiffer, 1847)
- Cerion sainthilarius Sánchez Roig, 1951
- Cerion salvatori Torre in Pilsbry, 1927
- Cerion sanctacruzense Aguayo & Jaume, 1951
- Cerion sanctamariae Aguayo & Jaume, 1951
- Cerion sanzi Blanes in Pilsbry & Vanatta, 1898
- Cerion scalarinum (Gundlach in Pfeiffer, 1860)
- Cerion scopulorum Aguayo & Jaume, 1951
- Cerion sculptum (Poey, 1858)
- Cerion sisal Clench & Aguayo, 1952
- Cerion tanamensis Sánchez Roig, 1951
- Cerion tenuilabre (Gundlach in Pfeiffer, 1870)
- Cerion torrei Blanes in Pilsbry & Vanatta, 1898
- Cerion tridentatun Pilsbry & Vanatta, 1895
- Cerion vanattai Clench & Aguayo, 1951
- Cerion venustum (Poey, 1858)
- Cerion victor Torre, 1929
- Cerion vulneratum (Küster, 1855)

Urocoptidae

- Acracoptis browni Torre & Bartsch, 2008
- Acracoptis delectabilis (Pilsbry, 1929)
- Acracoptis euclasta Torre & Bartsch, 2008
- Acracoptis florenciana (Pilsbry, 1929)
- Acracoptis rosaperdita Torre & Bartsch, 2008
- Acracoptis welchi Torre & Bartsch, 2008
- Amphistemma pilsbryana (Ramsden, 1914)
- Arangia aequatoris (Morelet, 1873)
- Arangia guantanamensis Torre & Bartsch, 2008
- Arangia gundlachi Torre & Bartsch, 2008
- Arangia johani Torre & Bartsch, 2008
- Arangia perfecta (Pilsbry, 1942)
- Arangia scobinata (Torre & Ramsden, 1915)
- Arangia sowerbyana (Pfeiffer, 1846)
- Badiofaux asinorum Torre & Bartsch, 2008
- Badiofaux cavernicola Torre & Bartsch, 2008
- Badiofaux elizabethae Torre & Bartsch, 2008
- Badiofaux gutierrezi (Arango, 1976)
- Badiofaux mendozana (Pilsbry, 1928)
- Badiofaux mogotensis Torre & Bartsch, 2008
- Badiofaux monelasmus (Pilsbry, 1928)
- Badiofaux plumbea (Wright in Pfeiffer, 1864)
- Badiofaux trilamellata (Pfeiffer, 1864)
- Bialasmus accola Torre & Bartsch, 2008
- Bialasmus bilamellata Torre & Bartsch, 2008
- Bialasmus imparata (Arango, 1882)
- Brachypodella angulifera (Gundlach in Pfeiffer, 1858)
- Brachypodella baracoensis Torre & Bartsch, 2008
- Brachypodella brooksiana (Gundlach in Pfeiffer, 1859)
- Brachypodella decipiens Torre & Bartsch, 2008
- Brachypodella electricola Torre & Bartsch, 2008
- Brachypodella elongatula Torre & Bartsch, 2008
- Brachypodella emerita Spence, 1927
- Brachypodella frederici Torre & Bartsch, 2008
- Brachypodella gracilior Torre & Bartsch, 2008
- Brachypodella lescallei Torre & Bartsch, 2008
- Brachypodella libanoensis Torre & Bartsch, 2008
- Brachypodella menciae Torre & Bartsch, 2008
- Brachypodella minuta (Gundlach in Pfeiffer, 1859)
- Brachypodella modica Torre & Bartsch, 2008
- Brachypodella prevali Torre & Bartsch, 2008
- Brachypodella ramsdeni Torre, 1914
- Brachypodella tanamensis Torre & Bartsch, 2008
- Brachypodella torreana Ramsden, 1914
- Brachypodella turcasiana (Gundlach in Pfeiffer, 1859)
- Callocoptis abdita (Arango, 1880)
- Callocoptis abraensis Torre & Bartsch, 2008
- Callocoptis hubbardi Torre & Bartsch, 2008
- Callocoptis vesperalis Torre & Bartsch, 2008
- Callonia dautzenbergiana (Crosse)
- Callonia elizabethae Torre & Bartsch, 2008
- Callonia ellioti (Poey, 1857)
- Callonia gemmata (Pilsbry, 1927)
- Callonia lowei (Torre, 1927)
- Capillacea angustior (Wright in Pfeiffer, 1864)
- Capillacea capillacea (Pfeiffer, 1863)
- Capillacea pulcherrima Torre & Bartsch, 2008
- Carcinostemma biperlata Torre & Bartsch, 2008
- Carcinostemma perlata (Gundlach in Pfeiffer, 1859)
- Centralia alvearis (Torre, 1911)
- Centralia bonachensis Torre & Bartsch, 2008
- Centralia chambaensis (Pilsbry, 1929)
- Centralia cioniscus (Torre, 1911)
- Centralia concolor Torre & Bartsch, 2008
- Centralia dilatata (Torre, 1911)
- Centralia dimidiata (Torre, 1911)
- Centralia fulva (Torre, 1911)
- Centralia intermedia (Torre, 1911)
- Centralia intuscoarctata (Torre, 1911)
- Centralia jungalitensis Torre & Bartsch, 2008
- Centralia martinezi Torre & Bartsch, 2008
- Centralia mayajiguensis (Torre, 1911)
- Centralia oblicua (Pfeiffer, 1863)
- Centralia obscura Torre & Bartsch, 2008
- Centralia torreana (Pilsbry, 1929)
- Centralia tuba (Torre, 1911)
- Centralia turgida (Torre, 1911)
- Centralia villarensis (Torre, 1911)
- Centralia yaguajayensis Torre & Bartsch, 2008
- Cochlodinella agustini Torre & Bartsch, 2008
- Cochlodinella alternans Torre & Bartsch, 2008
- Cochlodinella atra Torre & Bartsch, 2008
- Cochlodinella atropurpurea (Arango, 1882)
- Cochlodinella ayuaensis Torre & Bartsch, 2008
- Cochlodinella bermudezi Torre & Bartsch, 2008
- Cochlodinella blainiana (Gundlach in Pfeiffer, 1863)
- Cochlodinella broquelesensis Torre & Bartsch, 2008
- Cochlodinella caiguanaboensis Torre & Bartsch, 2008
- Cochlodinella canaleticola Torre & Bartsch, 2008
- Cochlodinella corralillensis Torre & Bartsch, 2008
- Cochlodinella dossierraensis Torre & Bartsch, 2008
- Cochlodinella grossior Torre & Bartsch, 2008
- Cochlodinella hendersoni Torre & Bartsch, 2008
- Cochlodinella illamellata (Wright in Pfeiffer, 1864)
- Cochlodinella jumaguaensis Torre & Bartsch, 2008
- Cochlodinella lacteoflua (Pilsbry, 1903)
- Cochlodinella laureani Torre & Bartsch, 2008
- Cochlodinella manzanillensis (Torre, 1930)
- Cochlodinella martinezi Torre & Bartsch, 2008
- Cochlodinella mediana (Pilsbry, 1913)
- Cochlodinella mixta (Wright in Pfeiffer, 1865)
- Cochlodinella mulo Torre & Bartsch, 2008
- Cochlodinella nana Torre & Bartsch, 2008
- Cochlodinella nipensis Torre & Bartsch, 2008
- Cochlodinella pelecostata Torre & Bartsch, 2008
- Cochlodinella petri Torre & Bartsch, 2008
- Cochlodinella poeyana (d'Orbigny, 1842)
- Cochlodinella presasiana (Pefeiffer, 1866)
- Cochlodinella pulchra Torre & Bartsch, 2008
- Cochlodinella rectaxis (Pilsbry, 1930)
- Cochlodinella regis Torre & Bartsch, 2008
- Cochlodinella saguaensis Torre & Bartsch, 2008
- Cochlodinella sculpturata Torre & Bartsch, 2008
- Cochlodinella soluta (Pfeiffer, 1863)
- Cochlodinella striatissima Torre & Bartsch, 2008
- Cochlodinella turiguanoensis Torre & Bartsch, 2008
- Cochlodinella variegata (Pfeiffer, 1842)
- Cochlodinella victoris Torre & Bartsch, 2008
- Geminicoptis rocai (Torre, 1929)
- Geminicoptis terebella (Torre, 1929)
- Gongylostoma arangiana (Gundlach in Arango, 1878)
- Gongylostoma artemisiae (Gundlach in Pfeiffer, 1863)
- Gongylostoma cardenasi Torre & Bartsch, 2008
- Gongylostoma confusa (Arango, 1882)
- Gongylostoma consimilis Torre & Bartsch, 2008
- Gongylostoma elegans (Pfeiffer, 1839)
- Gongylostoma fortis (Gundlach in Pfeiffer, 1864)
- Gongylostoma heterosculpta (Torre, 1932)
- Gongylostoma hilleiana (Gundlach in Arango, 1880)
- Gongylostoma lirata (Jimeno in Pfeiffer, 1864)
- Gongylostoma michaeli Torre & Bartsch, 2008
- Gongylostoma peccatrix Torre & Bartsch, 2008
- Gongylostoma pipianensis Torre & Bartsch, 2008
- Gongylostoma planospira (Pfeiffer, 1855)
- Gongylostoma proxima Torre & Bartsch, 2008
- Gongylostoma spatiosa Torre & Bartsch, 2008
- Gongylostomella banaoensis Torre & Bartsch, 2008
- Gongylostomella bicolor Torre & Bartsch, 2008
- Gongylostomella canteroiana (Gundlach in Arango, 1876)
- Gongylostomella contentiosa (Arango, 1884)
- Gongylostomella creola (Aguayo, 1934)
- Gongylostomella fortis Torre & Bartsch, 2008
- Gongylostomella gundlachi Torre & Bartsch, 2008
- Gongylostomella hilleri (Pfeiffer, 1862)
- Gongylostomella inaudita Torre & Bartsch, 2008
- Gongylostomella mayensis (Torre & Ramsden, 1915)
- Gongylostomella pilsbryi Torre & Bartsch, 2008
- Gongylostomella portuondoi Torre & Bartsch, 2008
- Gongylostomella regis Torre & Bartsch, 2008
- Gongylostomella semicostata Torre & Bartsch, 2008
- Gongylostomella strigis Torre & Bartsch, 2008
- Gongylostomella terneroensis Torre & Bartsch, 2008
- Gongylostomella turneri (Pilsbry, 1930)
- Gongylostomella vigiana Torre & Bartsch, 2008
- Gongylostomella wrighti (Pfeiffer, 1862)
- Heterocoptis bermudezi Torre & Bartsch, 2008
- Heterocoptis biayensis Torre & Bartsch, 2008
- Heterocoptis bicorda Torre & Bartsch, 2008
- Heterocoptis cachimboensis Torre & Bartsch, 2008
- Heterocoptis cara (Pilsbry & Henderson, 1912)
- Heterocoptis cavicostata Torre & Bartsch, 2008
- Heterocoptis chorrillensis Torre & Bartsch, 2008
- Heterocoptis clava Torre & Bartsch, 2008
- Heterocoptis guaicanamarensis Torre & Bartsch, 2008
- Heterocoptis guitarti Torre & Bartsch, 2008
- Heterocoptis jovai Torre & Bartsch, 2008
- Heterocoptis mellacea Torre & Bartsch, 2008
- Heterocoptis morenoi Torre & Bartsch, 2008
- Heterocoptis najasaensis Torre & Bartsch, 2008
- Heterocoptis parallela (Torre, 1912)
- Heterocoptis rubiola Torre & Bartsch, 2008
- Heterocoptis salvatoris Torre & Bartsch, 2008
- Heterocoptis sanchezi Torre & Bartsch, 2008
- Heterocoptis sublapidea Torre & Bartsch, 2008
- Heterocoptis tabacaria Torre & Bartsch, 2008
- Heterocoptis whittami Torre & Bartsch, 2008
- Idiostemma alfredoi Franke & Fernández Velázquez, 2007
- Idiostemma interrupta (Gundlach in Pfeiffer, 1857)
- Idiostemma scabrosa (Gundlach in Pfeiffer, 1859)
- Idiostemma uncata (Gundlach in Pfeiffer, 1859)
- Johaniceramus longus (Henderson, 1915)
- Levistemma peculiaris Torre & Bartsch, 2008
- Liocallonia andresensis Torre & Bartsch, 2008
- Liocallonia antoniensis Torre & Bartsch, 2008
- Liocallonia arthuri Torre & Bartsch, 2008
- Liocallonia attenuata Torre & Bartsch, 2008
- Liocallonia bierigi Torre & Bartsch, 2008
- Liocallonia bosquensis Torre & Bartsch, 2008
- Liocallonia brunnescens (Gundlach in Pfeiffer, 1863)
- Liocallonia cacarajicaraensis Torre & Bartsch, 2008
- Liocallonia canaletensis Torre & Bartsch, 2008
- Liocallonia chinensis Torre & Bartsch, 2008
- Liocallonia clara (Wright in Pfeiffer, 1865)
- Liocallonia cortinoi Torre & Bartsch, 2008
- Liocallonia cuestai (Torre, 1930)
- Liocallonia cumbrensis Torre & Bartsch, 2008
- Liocallonia densicostata Torre & Bartsch, 2008
- Liocallonia discrepans Torre & Bartsch, 2008
- Liocallonia dolores Torre & Bartsch, 2008
- Liocallonia galalonensis Torre & Bartsch, 2008
- Liocallonia guirensis (Gunldach in Pfeiffer, 1876)
- Liocallonia infortunata (Arango, 1882)
- Liocallonia itineris Torre & Bartsch, 2008
- Liocallonia jaguaensis Torre & Bartsch, 2008
- Liocallonia jaumei Torre & Bartsch, 2008
- Liocallonia minaensis Torre & Bartsch, 2008
- Liocallonia natensoni Torre & Bartsch, 2008
- Liocallonia notata (Gundlach in Pfeiffer, 1863)
- Liocallonia oligomesa (Pilsbry, 1903)
- Liocallonia palmae (Gundlach in Pfeiffer, 1876)
- Liocallonia patruelis (Arango, 1876)
- Liocallonia propinqua (Gundlach in Arango, 1882)
- Liocallonia saxosa (Poey, 1857)
- Liocallonia tacotacoensis Torre & Bartsch, 2008
- Liocallonia triplicata (Arango, 1882)
- Liocallonia vincta (Gundlach in Pfeiffer, 1863)
- Liocallonia volubilis (Morelet, 1849)
- Macroceramus aguadoresensis Torre & Bartsch, 2008
- Macroceramus amicorum Torre & Bartsch, 2008
- Macroceramus arangoi Pfeiffer, 1866
- Macroceramus bioscai Torre & Bartsch, 2008
- Macroceramus blaini Arango in Pfeiffer, 1866
- Macroceramus canimarensis (Pfeiffer, 1839)
- Macroceramus catenatus Gundlach in Pfeiffer, 1859
- Macroceramus claudens Gundlach in Pfeiffer, 1859
- Macroceramus clerchi Arango in Pfeiffer, 1866
- Macroceramus costulatus Gundlach in Pfeiffer, 1859
- Macroceramus crenatus Gundlach in Pfeiffer, 1863
- Macroceramus cuzcoensis Torre & Bartsch, 2008
- Macroceramus festus Gundlach in Pfeiffer, 1859
- Macroceramus garcianus Torre & Bartsch, 2008
- Macroceramus giganteus Sánchez Roig
- Macroceramus grobei Pfeiffer, 1862
- Macroceramus gundlachi (Pfeiffer, 1852)
- Macroceramus hendersoni Torre, 1909
- Macroceramus inermis Gundlach in Pfeiffer, 1858
- Macroceramus interrogationis Torre & Bartsch, 2008
- Macroceramus jaumei Sanchez Roig
- Macroceramus jeannereti Gundlach in Pfeiffer, 1858
- Macroceramus muscatus Torre & Bartsch, 2008
- Macroceramus notatus (Gundlach in Pfeiffer, 1859)
- Macroceramus parallelus Arango in Pfeiffer, 1866
- Macroceramus pazi Gundlach in Pfeiffer, 1858
- Macroceramus picturatus Torre & Bartsch, 2008
- Macroceramus pictus Gundlach in Pfeiffer, 1858
- Macroceramus pupoides Pfeiffer, 1863
- Macroceramus regis Pilsbry, 1930
- Macroceramus rotundibasis Pilsbry, 1913
- Macroceramus sanchezi Torre & Bartsch, 2008
- Macroceramus siboneyensis Torre & Bartsch, 2008
- Macroceramus simplex Pfeiffer, 1863
- Macroceramus torrei Pilsbry, 1930
- Macroceramus utriculus Torre & Bartsch, 2008
- Macroceramus vanattai Pilsbry, 1930
- Macroceramus variabilis Pfeiffer, 1863
- Macroceramus wrighti Torre & Bartsch, 2008
- Macroceramus yateresense Sánchez Roig
- Microceramus abraensis Torre & Bartsch, 2008
- Microceramus aguayoi Torre & Bartsch, 2008
- Microceramus alegrensis Torre & Bartsch, 2008
- Microceramus anafensis Henderson, 1916
- Microceramus angulosus (Gundlach in Pfeiffer, 1857)
- Microceramus bermudezi Torre & Bartsch, 2008
- Microceramus bioscanus Torre & Bartsch, 2008
- Microceramus cabocruzensis Torre & Bartsch, 2008
- Microceramus camariocaensis Torre & Bartsch, 2008
- Microceramus camayensis Torre & Bartsch, 2008
- Microceramus caninus Torre & Bartsch, 2008
- Microceramus caninus Torre & Bartsch, 2008
- Microceramus carinatus Torre & Bartsch, 2008
- Microceramus catalinensis Torre & Bartsch, 2008
- Microceramus cienfuegoensis Torre & Bartsch, 2008
- Microceramus coliseoensis Torre & Bartsch, 2008
- Microceramus conicus Torre & Bartsch, 2008
- Microceramus costatus Torre & Bartsch, 2008
- Microceramus costellaris (Gundlach in Pfeiffer, 1863)
- Microceramus cubaensis Torre & Bartsch, 2008
- Microceramus delicatus Torre & Bartsch, 2008
- Microceramus denticulatus (Gundlach in Pfeiffer, 1863)
- Microceramus dulcis Torre & Bartsch, 2008
- Microceramus elegans (Gundlach in Pfeiffer, 1863)
- Microceramus euclatus Torre & Bartsch, 2008
- Microceramus florencianus Pilsbry, 1930
- Microceramus fogonensis Torre & Bartsch, 2008
- Microceramus gertrudis Torre & Bartsch, 2008
- Microceramus goseei (Pfeiffer, 1845)
- Microceramus havanensis Torre & Bartsch, 2008
- Microceramus hendersoni Torre & Bartsch, 2008
- Microceramus hicacoensis Torre & Bartsch, 2008
- Microceramus infradenticulatus (Wright in Pfeiffer, 1864)
- Microceramus islandicus Torre & Bartsch, 2008
- Microceramus latus (Gundlach in Pfeiffer, 1863)
- Microceramus laureanus Torre & Bartsch, 2008
- Microceramus leptus Torre & Bartsch, 2008
- Microceramus longus Henderson
- Microceramus maculatus (Gundlach in Pfeiffer, 1865)
- Microceramus marmoratus Torre & Bartsch, 2008
- Microceramus martinezi Torre & Bartsch, 2008
- Microceramus minor (Arango in Pfeiffer, 1866)
- Microceramus modestus Torre & Bartsch, 2008
- Microceramus mota Pilsbry, 1920
- Microceramus nigropictus (Gundlach in Pfeiffer, 1863)
- Microceramus orientalis Aguayo, 1935
- Microceramus paivanus (Pfeiffer, 1866)
- Microceramus palenquensis (Gundlach in Pfeiffer, 1863)
- Microceramus palmarensis Torre & Bartsch, 2008
- Microceramus perconicus Pilsbry, 1904
- Microceramus petitianus (d'Orbigny, 1841)
- Microceramus pilsbryi Torre & Bartsch, 2008
- Microceramus pipianensis Torre & Bartsch, 2008
- Microceramus portuondoi Torre & Bartsch, 2008
- Microceramus puntillaensis Torre & Bartsch, 2008
- Microceramus realensis Torre & Bartsch, 2008
- Microceramus remedioensis Torre & Bartsch, 2008
- Microceramus rufus Torre & Bartsch, 2008
- Microceramus sanctispiritensis Pilsbry, 1913
- Microceramus simplex (Pfeiffer, 1863)
- Microceramus sublatus Pilsbry & Torre, 1930
- Microceramus tantalus Torre & Bartsch, 2008
- Microceramus tenuistriatus Pilsbry, 1913
- Microceramus trinidadensis Torre & Bartsch, 2008
- Microceramus turricula (Pfeiffer, 1839)
- Microceramus virilus Torre & Bartsch, 2008
- Nesocoptis leoni Torre & Bartsch, 2008
- Nesocoptis majuscula Torre & Bartsch, 2008
- Nesocoptis mortei Torre & Bartsch, 2008
- Nesocoptis prima (Arango, 1882)
- Nesocoptis pruinosa (Morelet, 1849)
- Nodulia amoenivallis (Pilsbry, 1929)
- Nodulia caponensis Torre & Bartsch, 2008
- Nodulia corpulenta (Spence, 1936)
- Nodulia handi (Torre, 1927)
- Nodulia nodulifera (Torre, 1929)
- Nodulia oblita Torre & Bartsch, 2008
- Nodulia vignalensis (Wright in Pfeiffer, 1863)
- Organocoptis caiguanaboensis Torre & Bartsch, 2008
- Organocoptis catalinensis Torre & Bartsch, 2008
- Organocoptis constantia Torre & Bartsch, 2008
- Organocoptis fusiformis (Wright in Pfeiffer, 1863)
- Organocoptis galalonensis Torre & Bartsch, 2008
- Organocoptis integra (Pfeiffer, 1856)
- Organocoptis natensoni Torre & Bartsch, 2008
- Organocoptis portalesensis Torre & Bartsch, 2008
- Organocoptis remota (Arango, 1880)
- Organocoptis vigilantes Torre & Bartsch, 2008
- Paracallonia albocrenata (Gundlach in Pfeiffer, 1873)
- Pfeiffericoptis blanesi Torre & Bartsch, 2008
- Pfeiffericoptis cardenasensis Torre & Bartsch, 2008
- Pfeiffericoptis concreta (Gundlach in Pfeiffer,1863)
- Pfeiffericoptis cristallina (Wright in Pfeiffer, 1865)
- Pfeiffericoptis fumosa (Gundlach in Pfeiffer, 1863)
- Pfeiffericoptis garciana (Wright in Poey, 1864)
- Pfeiffericoptis insulana Torre & Bartsch, 2008
- Pfeiffericoptis lucens (Wright in Sowerby, 1875)
- Pfeiffericoptis machoi (Arango, 1876)
- Pfeiffericoptis moralesi (Gundlach in Arango, 1876)
- Pfeiffericoptis sagraiana (Pfeiffer, 1840)
- Pfeiffericoptis sinistra Torre & Bartsch, 2008
- Pfeiffericoptis wrightiana Torre & Bartsch, 2008
- Pineria beathiana Poey, 1854
- Pineria terebra Poey, 1854
- Planostemma intusfalcata (Torre & Ramsden, 1909)
- Planostemma laevigata (Gundlach in Pfeiffer, 1859)
- Planostemma miranda (Pilsbry, 1929)
- Planostemma pilotensis (Gundlach in Arango, 1862)
- Pleurostemma geminata (Gundlach in Pfeiffer, 1870)
- Pleurostemma intusmalleata (Gundlach in Pfeiffer, 1855)
- Pleurostemma perplicata (Beck, 1837)
- Poecilocoptis coerulans (Poey, 1864)
- Poecilocoptis crassilabris (Arango, 1882)
- Poecilocoptis diaphana (Wright in Arango, 1880)
- Poecilocoptis discors (Poey, 1856)
- Poecilocoptis incerta (Arango, 1881)
- Poecilocoptis lagunillensis (Pilsbry, 1903)
- Poecilocoptis macra (Wright in Pfeiffer, 1867)
- Poecilocoptis nubila (Poey, 1864)
- Poeycoptis auberiana (d'Orbigny, 1842)
- Poeycoptis caeciliae (Gundlach in Arango, 1876)
- Poeycoptis lituus (Gould, 1842)
- Poeycoptis sosai Torre & Bartsch, 2008
- Pycnoptychia amicorum Torre & Bartsch, 2008
- Pycnoptychia humboldtiana (Pfeiffer, 1840)
- Pycnoptychia oviedoiana (d'Orbigny, 1842)
- Pycnoptychia peraffinis (Pilsbry, 1903)
- Pycnoptychia scaeva (Gundlach in Pfeiffer, 1863)
- Pycnoptychia shuttleworthiana (Poey, 1856)
- Pycnoptychia strangulata (Poey, 1856)
- Pycnoptychia striatella (Wright in Pfeiffer, 1864)
- Pycnoptychia torrei (Arango, 1876)
- Pycnoptychia trina Torre & Bartsch, 2008
- Sagracoptis consanguinea (Arango, 1882)
- Sagracoptis coronadoi (Arango in Pfeiffer, 1864)
- Sagracoptis crispula (Pfeiffer, 1839)
- Sagracoptis difficultosa (Arango, 1882)
- Sagracoptis distincta (Gundlach in Arango, 1876)
- Sagracoptis robusta Torre & Bartsch, 2008
- Sagracoptis scholappi Torre & Bartsch, 2008
- Septilumem ornata (Gundlach in Pfeiffer, 1859)
- Spiroceramus amplus (Pfeiffer, 1858)
- Spiroceramus barbouri Aguayo, 1958
- Spiroceramus castanedoi Torre & Bartsch, 2008
- Spiroceramus pilsbryi Clench
- Spiroceramus vanattai Clench
- Steatocoptis abnormis (Gundlach in Pilsbry, 1903)
- Steatocoptis bioscai Torre & Bartsch, 2008
- Steatocoptis ventricosa (Gundlach in Pfeiffer, 1857)
- Teneria teneriensis (Wright in Pfeiffer, 1865)
- Teniustemma multispiralis (Sowerby, 1875)
- Tenuistemma lateralis (Paz in Pfeiffer, 1860)
- Tetrentodon acus Torre & Bartsch, 2008
- Tetrentodon aguayoi Torre & Bartsch, 2008
- Tetrentodon alleni Torre & Bartsch, 2008
- Tetrentodon antonitensis Torre & Bartsch, 2008
- Tetrentodon barroi Torre & Bartsch, 2008
- Tetrentodon bijaensis Torre & Bartsch, 2008
- Tetrentodon bonillensis Torre & Bartsch, 2008
- Tetrentodon brevicollis Pfeiffer in Pilsbry, 1903
- Tetrentodon camaronensis Torre & Bartsch, 2008
- Tetrentodon camoensis (Pfeiffer, 1855)
- Tetrentodon canasiensis Torre & Bartsch, 2008
- Tetrentodon canimarensis Torre & Bartsch, 2008
- Tetrentodon caobaensis Torre & Bartsch, 2008
- Tetrentodon ceciliasensis Torre & Bartsch, 2008
- Tetrentodon ceiba Torre & Bartsch, 2008
- Tetrentodon ceibamochensis Torre & Bartsch, 2008
- Tetrentodon claritaensis Torre & Bartsch, 2008
- Tetrentodon clenchi (Aguayo, 1932)
- Tetrentodon clerchi (Arango in Pfeiffer, 1870)
- Tetrentodon cocaensis Torre & Bartsch, 2008
- Tetrentodon coliseoensis Torre & Bartsch, 2008
- Tetrentodon cyclostoma (Pfeiffer, 1855)
- Tetrentodon distorta Torre & Bartsch, 2008
- Tetrentodon elizaldensis Torre & Bartsch, 2008
- Tetrentodon emili Torre & Bartsch, 2008
- Tetrentodon empalmensis Torre & Bartsch, 2008
- Tetrentodon filiola Torre & Bartsch, 2008
- Tetrentodon gracillima (Poey, 1853)
- Tetrentodon gravidula Torre & Bartsch, 2008
- Tetrentodon grillensis Torre & Bartsch, 2008
- Tetrentodon guanaboensis Torre & Bartsch, 2008
- Tetrentodon gundlachiana (Poey, 1856)
- Tetrentodon hesperia Torre & Bartsch, 2008
- Tetrentodon insuflata Torre & Bartsch, 2008
- Tetrentodon ischna (Pilsbry, 1903)
- Tetrentodon itineraris Torre & Bartsch, 2008
- Tetrentodon jarucoensis Torre & Bartsch, 2008
- Tetrentodon lajasensis Torre & Bartsch, 2008
- Tetrentodon lermondi Torre & Bartsch, 2008
- Tetrentodon limonarensis Torre & Bartsch, 2008
- Tetrentodon madrugaensis Torre & Bartsch, 2008
- Tetrentodon marmorata (Shuttleworth, 1852)
- Tetrentodon martii Torre & Bartsch, 2008
- Tetrentodon mellita (Torre, 1932)
- Tetrentodon mendezi Torre & Bartsch, 2008
- Tetrentodon miraderoensis Torre & Bartsch, 2008
- Tetrentodon mochensis Torre & Bartsch, 2008
- Tetrentodon modesta (Poey, 1858)
- Tetrentodon montanensis Torre & Bartsch, 2008
- Tetrentodon montecristensis Torre & Bartsch, 2008
- Tetrentodon mudoensis Torre & Bartsch, 2008
- Tetrentodon nana Torre & Bartsch, 2008
- Tetrentodon nazarenensis Torre & Bartsch, 2008
- Tetrentodon palenquensis Torre & Bartsch, 2008
- Tetrentodon palmeri Torre & Bartsch, 2008
- Tetrentodon paucicostata Torre & Bartsch, 2008
- Tetrentodon perdidoensis Torre & Bartsch, 2008
- Tetrentodon perdita Torre & Bartsch, 2008
- Tetrentodon perlonga (Torre, 1932)
- Tetrentodon philippiana (Pfeiffer, 1845)
- Tetrentodon pipianensis Torre & Bartsch, 2008
- Tetrentodon plicata (Poey, 1856)
- Tetrentodon poeyi Torre & Bartsch, 2008
- Tetrentodon porrecta Torre & Bartsch, 2008
- Tetrentodon portuondoi Torre, 1932
- Tetrentodon ritae Torre & Bartsch, 2008
- Tetrentodon ritana Torre & Bartsch, 2008
- Tetrentodon rugeli (Shuttleworht, 1852)
- Tetrentodon santacruzensis Torre & Bartsch, 2008
- Tetrentodon sardae Torre & Bartsch, 2008
- Tetrentodon scalarina Torre & Bartsch, 2008
- Tetrentodon sexdecimalis Jimeno in Pfeiffer, 1863
- Tetrentodon sparsicostata Torre & Bartsch, 2008
- Tetrentodon striosa Torre & Bartsch, 2008
- Tetrentodon tenuicostata Torre & Bartsch, 2008
- Tetrentodon tenuistriata (Aguayo, 1932)
- Tetrentodon vesperalis Torre & Bartsch, 2008
- Tetrentodon viruelaensis Torre & Bartsch, 2008
- Tomelasmus adnatus (Pfeiffer, 1864)
- Tomelasmus arcustriatus (Wright in Pfeiffer, 1863)
- Tomelasmus assimilis (Arango, 1884)
- Tomelasmus azucarensis Torre & Bartsch, 2008
- Tomelasmus caroli Torre & Bartsch, 2008
- Tomelasmus chorrerensis Torre & Bartsch, 2008
- Tomelasmus coloratus (Arango, 1882)
- Tomelasmus crenulatus (Gundlach, 1857)
- Tomelasmus decoloratus (Gundlach in Pfeiffer, 1863)
- Tomelasmus denticulatus (Pfeiffer, 1853)
- Tomelasmus hesperius Jaume & Torre, 1972
- Tomelasmus irroratus (Gundlach, 1856)
- Tomelasmus julii Jaume & Torre, 1972
- Tomelasmus lavalleanus (d'Orbigny, 1842)
- Tomelasmus sauvalleanus (Gundlach, 1856)
- Tomelasmus semicoloratus (Spence, 1936)
- Tomelasmus thomsoni (Arango, 1884)
- Tomelasmus torquatus (Morelet, 1849)
- Tomelasmus tumidiorus (Sowerby, 1875)
- Torrecoptis acicularis (Torre, 1912)
- Torrecoptis amica Torre & Bartsch, 2008
- Torrecoptis anafensis (Henderson, 1916)
- Torrecoptis atkinsi (Torre & Clench, 1930)
- Torrecoptis bacillaris (Torre, 1912)
- Torrecoptis baculum (Pilsbry, 1903)
- Torrecoptis barbouri (Clench & Torre, 1930)
- Torrecoptis barretticola Torre & Bartsch, 2008
- Torrecoptis camagueyana (Torre, 1913)
- Torrecoptis capitoliensis Torre & Bartsch, 2008
- Torrecoptis caracunaensis Torre & Bartsch, 2008
- Torrecoptis cinerea (Pfeiffer, 1850)
- Torrecoptis columbarii Torre & Bartsch, 2008
- Torrecoptis concinna Torre & Bartsch, 2008
- Torrecoptis costellaris Torre & Bartsch, 2008
- Torrecoptis curta Torre & Bartsch, 2008
- Torrecoptis decipiens Torre & Bartsch, 2008
- Torrecoptis depressicostata Torre & Bartsch, 2008
- Torrecoptis dorotheae Torre & Bartsch, 2008
- Torrecoptis eustriata Torre & Bartsch, 2008
- Torrecoptis evanescens Torre & Bartsch, 2008
- Torrecoptis fortiuscula (Torre, 1912)
- Torrecoptis fuscula Torre & Bartsch, 2008
- Torrecoptis goodrichi Torre & Bartsch, 2008
- Torrecoptis guajenensis Torre & Bartsch, 2008
- Torrecoptis holguinensis (Aguayo, 1934)
- Torrecoptis lajoncheri (Arango, 1884)
- Torrecoptis livida (Torre, 1912)
- Torrecoptis longa (Pilsbry & Henderson, 1913)
- Torrecoptis mameyensis Torre & Bartsch, 2008
- Torrecoptis maraguanensis Torre & Bartsch, 2008
- Torrecoptis martinensis Torre & Bartsch, 2008
- Torrecoptis mercedesensis (Pilsbry, 1930)
- Torrecoptis minaensis Torre & Bartsch, 2008
- Torrecoptis nataliae Torre & Bartsch, 2008
- Torrecoptis occulta (Torre, 1912)
- Torrecoptis oleacea Torre & Bartsch, 2008
- Torrecoptis pallidula (Torre, 1912)
- Torrecoptis parvula Torre & Bartsch, 2008
- Torrecoptis paucicostata Torre & Bartsch, 2008
- Torrecoptis percostata Torre & Bartsch, 2008
- Torrecoptis polita Torre & Bartsch, 2008
- Torrecoptis praeclara Torre & Bartsch, 2008
- Torrecoptis puriosensis Torre & Bartsch, 2008
- Torrecoptis recticostata Torre & Bartsch, 2008
- Torrecoptis remoticostata Torre & Bartsch, 2008
- Torrecoptis rinconensis Torre & Bartsch, 2008
- Torrecoptis riveroni Torre & Bartsch, 2008
- Torrecoptis rufescens Torre & Bartsch, 2008
- Torrecoptis semistriata Torre & Bartsch, 2008
- Torrecoptis serrana Torre & Bartsch, 2008
- Torrecoptis sifontesi Torre & Bartsch, 2008
- Torrecoptis sororcula Torre & Bartsch, 2008
- Torrecoptis spatiata Torre & Bartsch, 2008
- Torrecoptis spirifer (Pilsbry, 1930)
- Torrecoptis stricta (Torre, 1912)
- Torrecoptis teniusculpta Torre & Bartsch, 2008
- Torrecoptis trincherasensis Torre & Bartsch, 2008
- Torrecoptis unctuella Torre & Bartsch, 2008
- Torrecoptis vermicularis Torre & Bartsch, 2008
- Torrecoptis vitulina Torre & Bartsch, 2008
- Torrecoptis welchi Torre & Bartsch, 2008
- Torrecoptis yaguajayensis Torre & Bartsch, 2008
- Torrecoptis zanjonensis Torre & Bartsch, 2008
- Trilamellaxis castanea (Torre, 1911)
- Trilamellaxis fallax (Torre, 1911)
- Trilamellaxis parallela Torre & Bartsch, 2008
- Trilamellaxis proteus (Torre, 1911)
- Trilamellaxis remediensis (Torre, 1911)
- Trilamellaxis transitoria (Torre, 1911)
- Uncinicoptis affinis (Pffeifer, 1864)
- Uncinicoptis brevicervix (Pilsbry, 1878)
- Uncinicoptis heynemanni (Pfeiffer, 1865)
- Uncinicoptis hidalgoi (Arango, 1879)
- Uncinicoptis joaquini (Pilsbry, 1903)
- Uncinicoptis sancticola Torre & Bartsch, 2008
- Uncinicoptis tenericola Torre & Bartsch, 2008
- Uncinicoptis unguiculata (Arango, 1880)

Ferussaciidae

- Cecilioides aperta (Guilding in Swainson, 1840)
- Cecilioides consobrina (d'Orbigny, 1842)
- Cecilioides iota (C. B. Adams, 1845)

Subulinidae

- Beckianum beckianum (Pfeiffer, 1846)

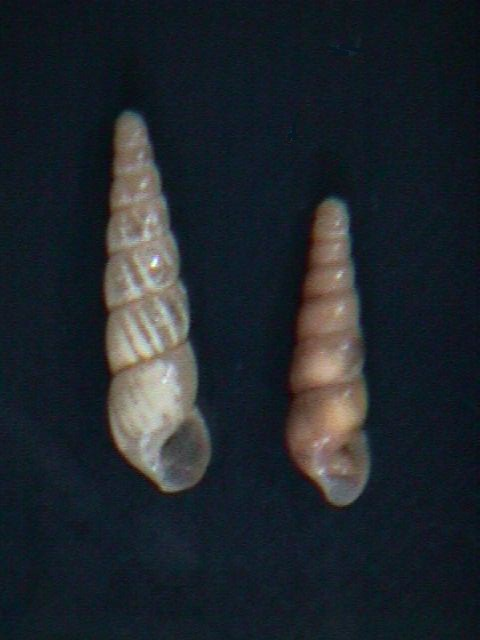
Subulina octona

- Cryptelasmus alcaldei Jaume & Sánchez de Fuentes, 1943
- Cryptelasmus canteroiana (Gundlach in Pfeiffer, 1857)
- Cryptelasmus verai Jaume & Sánchez de Fuentes, 1943
- Cupulella dominguezi Aguayo & Jaume, 1948
- Cupulella vallei Aguayo & Jaume, 1948
- Lamellaxis gracilis (Hutton, 1834)
- Lamellaxis micra (d'Orbigny, 1835)
- Leptinaria paludinoides (d'Orbigny, 1842)
- Leptinaria striosa abdita (Poey, 1858)
- Leptinaria unilamellata (d'Orbigny, 1835)
- Obeliscus acicularis Aguayo & Jaume, 1957
- Obeliscus angustatus (Gundlach, 1856)
- Obeliscus bacillus (Pfeiffer, 1861)
- Obeliscus basilissa Aguayo & Jaume, 1954
- Obeliscus binneyi Pilsbry, 1906
- Obeliscus blandianus Pilsbry, 1906
- Obeliscus clavus flavus Pilsbry, 1906
- Obeliscus gonostoma (Gundlach in Pfeiffer, 1863)
- Obeliscus gundlachi (Pfeiffer, 1863)
- Obeliscus homalogyrus (Shuttleworth in Pfeiffer, 1851)
- Obeliscus lata Gundlach in Pilsbry, 1905
- Obeliscus maximus (Poey, 1854)
- Obeliscus microstoma (Gundlach in Pfeiffer, 1863)
- Obeliscus paradoxus (Arango, 1881)
- Obeliscus petricola Aguayo & Jaume, 1957
- Obeliscus saugeti Aguayo & Jaume, 1957
- Obeliscus strictus (Poey, 1853)
- Obeliscus swiftianus (Pfeiffer, 1852)
- Obeliscus terebraster (Lamarck, 1822)
- Opeas hannense (Pfeiffer, 1840)
- Rumina decollata (Linné, 1758) - decollate snail
- Subulina octona (Bruguiére, 1792)

Oleacinidae

- Glandinella poeyana (Pfeiffer, 1854)
- Melaniella acuticostata (d'Orbigny, 1842)
- Melaniella alcaldei Aguayo & Jaume, 1954
- Melaniella bermudezi Aguayo & Jaume, 1954
- Melaniella camagueyana Aguayo & Jaume, 1954
- Melaniella fuentesi Aguayo & Jaume, 1954
- Melaniella gracillima (Pfeiffer, 1839)
- Melaniella manzanillensis (Gundlach in Pfeiffer, 1857)
- Melaniella multicosta (Gundlach in Pfeiffer, 1866)
- Melaniella pichardi (Arango, 1862)
- Melaniella quiñonesi Aguayo & Jaume, 1954
- Melaniella scalarina (Gundlach in Pfeiffer, 1866)
- Melaniella tuberculata Gundlach in Poey, 1858
- Oleacina cyanozoaria Gundlach in Pfeiffer, 1857
- Oleacina incerta (Reeve in Pfeiffer, 1866)
- Oleacina incisa Pfeiffer, 1867
- Oleacina lindoni (Pfeiffer, 1846)
- Oleacina orysacea (Rang in d'Orbigny, 1842)
- Oleacina ottonis (Pfeiffer)
- Oleacina poeyana Pfeiffer, 1866
- Oleacina rangelina Aguayo, 1953
- Oleacina regularis (Gundlach in Pfeiffer, 1857)
- Oleacina saturata (Gundlach in Pfeiffer, 1857)
- Oleacina sicilis Morelet, 1849
- Oleacina solidula (Pfeiffer, 1840)
- Oleacina straminea (Deshayes, 1819)
- Oleacina subulata (Pfeiffer, 1839)
- Oleacina teres Pfeiffer, 1866
- Oleacina translucida Gundlach in Pfeiffer, 1860
- Oleacina wrighti Pfeiffer, 1866
- Rectoleacina cubensis (d'Orbigny, 1842)
- Rectoleacina episcopalis (Morelet)
- Rectoleacina suturalis (Pfeiffer, 1839)
- Varicella elata (Gundlach in Pfeiffer, 1857)
- Varicella gundlachi (Pfeiffer, 1866)
- Varicella multilineata Pilsbry, 1907
- Varicella swiftiana Pilsbry, 1907
- Varicella trinitaria (Gundlach in Poey, 1858)

Spiraxidae

- Pseudosubulina exilis (Pfeiffer, 1839)
- Pseudosubulina iridescens Ramsden & Torre, ms.
- Pseudosubulina michaudiana (d'Orbigny, 1842)
- Spiraxis moreletianus Pfeiffer, 1866
- Volutaxis melanielloides Gundlach in Pfeiffer, 1858

Streptaxidae

- Rhabdogulella bicolor (Hutton, 1834)
- Tomostele musaecola (Morelet, 1860)

Haplotrematidae

- Haplotrema paucispira (Poey, 1858)

Helicodiscidae

- Helicodiscus apex (C. B. Adams, 1849)
- Helicodiscus ramsdeni Pilsbry, 1942

Sagdidae

- Euclastaria debilis (Pfeiffer, 1839)
- Euclastaria euclasta (Shuttleworth, 1852)
- Hojeda boothiana (Pfeiffer, 1839)
- Hojeda gracilis (Poey, 1865)
- Hojeda holguinensis Clench & Aguayo, 1953
- Hojeda mayarina Aguayo, 1953
- Hojeda montetaurina (Pfeiffer, 1859)
- Hojeda translucens (Gundlach in Pfeiffer, 1860)
- Lacteoluna prominula (Pfeiffer, 1858)
- Lacteoluna selenina (Gould, 1839)
- Lacteoluna turbiniformis (Pfeiffer, 1839)
- Odontosagda havanensis Vanatta, 1920
- Odontosagda hillei (Gundlach in Pfeiffer, 1870)
- Setipellis stigmatica (Pfeiffer, 1841)
- Suavitas raripila (Morelet, 1851)
- Suavitas suavis (Gundlach, 1857)
- Volvidens tichostoma (Pfeiffer, 1839)

Gastrodontidae

- Zonitoides arboreus (Say, 1862)
- Zonitoides bregyl Vanatta, 1920

Euconulidae

- Euconulus fulvus (Müller, 1774)
- Guppya gundlachi (Pfeiffer, 1840)

Zonitidae

- Retinella identata paucilirata (Morelet, 1864)

Agriolimacidae

- Deroceras laeve (Müller, 1774)
- Deroceras agreste (Linné, 1758)
- Deroceras retitulatum (Müller, 1774)

Vitrinidae

- Hawaiia minuscula (Binney, 1840)

Bradybaenidae

- Bradybaena similaris (Férussac, 1821)

Camaenidae

- Caracolus lowei Pilsbry, 1929
- Caracolus najazensis Clench & Aguayo, 1951
- Caracolus sagemon (Beck, 1837)
- Polydontes apollo (Pfeiffer, 1860)
- Polydontes imperator (Montfort, 1810)
- Polydontes natensoni Torre, 1938
- Polydontes sobrina (Férussac, 1819)
- Polydontes torrei Pilsbry, 1938
- Zachrysia auricoma (Férussac, 1822)
- Zachrysia baracoensis (Gutierrez in Pfeiffer, 1856)
- Zachrysia bayamensis (Pfeiffer, 1854)
- Zachrysia emarginata (Gundlach in Pfeiffer, 1859)
- Zachrysia flavicoma Pilsbry, 1928
- Zachrysia gibarana Pilsbry, 1928
- Zachrysia guanensis (Poey, 1857)
- Zachrysia guantanamensis (Poey, 1857)
- Zachrysia gundlachiana Pilsbry, 1928
- Zachrysia lamellicosta (Gundlach in Pfeiffer, 1861)
- Zachrysia noscibilis (Férussac, 1822)
- Zachrysia petitiana (d'Orbigny, 1842)
- Zachrysia poeyi Jaume, 1984
- Zachrysia proboscidea (Pfeiffer, 1856)
- Zachrysia provisoria (Pfeiffer, 1858)
- Zachrysia ramsdeni Pilsbry, 1928
- Zachrysia rangelina (Pfeiffer, 1854)
- Zachrysia torrei (Henderson, 1916)
- Zachrysia trinitaria (Gundlach in Pfeiffer, 1858)

Cepolidae

- Coryda alauda (Férussac, 1821)
- Coryda armasi Sarasúa, 1972
- Coryda bartlettiana (Pfeiffer, 1848)
- Coryda lindoni (Pfeiffer, 1846)
- Coryda melanocephala (Gundlach in Pfeiffer, 1859)
- Coryda nigropicta (Arango in Poey, 1867)
- Coryda ovumreguli (Lea)
- Cysticopsis auberi (d'Orbigny, 1842)
- Cysticopsis comes (Poey, 1858)
- Cysticopsis cubensis (Pfeiffer, 1840)
- Cysticopsis exauberi Aguayo & Jaume, 1954
- Cysticopsis jaudenesi (Cisneros in Arango, 1876)
- Cysticopsis lassevillei (Gundlach in Pfeiffer, 1861)
- Cysticopsis lescallei (Gundlach in Pfeiffer, 1859)
- Cysticopsis letranensis (Pfeiffer, 1857)
- Cysticopsis luzi (Arango in Poey, 1868)
- Cysticopsis naevula (Morelet)
- Cysticopsis pemphigodes (Pfeiffer, 1846)
- Eurycampta arctistria (Pfeiffer, 1865)
- Eurycampta bonplandi (Lamarck, 1822)
- Eurycampta exdeflexa (Pilsbry, 1890)
- Eurycampta pinarensis (Aguayo, 1950)
- Eurycampta poeyi (Petit, 1836)
- Eurycampta supertexta (Pfeiffer, 1845)
- Hemitrochus alleni Aguayo & Jaume, 1957
- Hemitrochus amplecta (Gundlach in Pfeiffer, 1860)
- Hemitrochus beattiei Aguayo & Jaume, 1957
- Hemitrochus cesticulus (Gundlach in Pfeiffer, 1858)
- Hemitrochus compta (Gundlach in Pfeiffer, 1857)
- Hemitrochus fuscolabiata (Poey, 1858)
- Hemitrochus garciana Clench & Aguayo, 1953
- Hemitrochus hendersoni Aguayo & Jaume, 1957
- Hemitrochus lucipeta (Poey, 1854)
- Hemitrochus maculifera (Gutiérrez in Poey, 1858)
- Hemitrochus maisiana Aguayo & Jaume, 1957
- Hemitrochus morbida (Morelet)
- Hemitrochus pseudogilva Torre
- Hemitrochus rufoapicata (Poey, 1858)
- Hemitrochus sauvallei (Arango in Pfeiffer, 1866)
- Hemitrochus tephritis (Morelet)
- Hemitrochus varians (Menke, 1829)
- Hemitrochus velazqueziana (Poey, 1858)
- Jeanneretia bicincta (Menke, 1830)
- Jeanneretia gundlachi Clench & Aguayo, 1951
- Jeanneretia jaumei Clench & Aguayo, 1951
- Jeanneretia modica Clench & Aguayo, 1951
- Jeanneretia parraiana (d'Orbigny, 1842)
- Jeanneretia sagraiana (d'Orbigny, 1842)
- Jeanneretia subtussulcata (Wright in Pfeiffer, 1863)
- Jeanneretia torrei Clench & Aguayo, 1933
- Jeanneretia wrighti (Gundlach in Pfeiffer, 1865)
- Plagiotycha gregoriana Dall, 1905

Polygyridae

- Daedalochila poeyi Aguayo & Jaume, 1947
- Polygyra lingulata (Deshayes in Férussac, 1859)
- Praticolella griseola (Pfeiffer, 1841)

Thysanophoridae

- Thysanophora incrustata (Poey, 1852)
- Thysanophora jeannereti (Pfeiffer, 1858)
- Thysanophora saxicola (Pfeiffer, 1840)
- Thysanophora plagioptycha (Shuttleworth, 1854)

Cepolidae or Helminthoglyptidae or Xanthonychidae or

- genus Polymita Beck, 1837 is endemic to Cuba

== Bivalvia ==
Unionidae

- Nephronaias gundlachi (Dunker, 1858) – endemic to Pinar del Río, scarce distribution
- Nephronaias scammata (Morelet, 1849) – endemic to Pinar del Río, scarce distribution

Corbiculidae

- Corbicula fluminea (O. F. Müller, 1774) – introduced.

== See also ==
- List of marine molluscs of Cuba

Lists of molluscs of surrounding countries:

- List of non-marine molluscs of the United States
- List of non-marine molluscs of the Bahamas
- List of non-marine molluscs of Haiti
- List of non-marine molluscs of Jamaica
- List of non-marine molluscs of the Cayman Islands
- List of non-marine molluscs of Mexico
