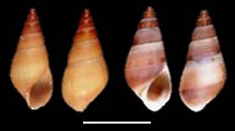
- Two views of two shells of Hemisinus cubanianus

Scientific classification
- Kingdom: Animalia
- Phylum: Mollusca
- Class: Gastropoda
- Subclass: Caenogastropoda
- Order: incertae sedis
- Family: Hemisinidae
- Genus: Hemisinus
- Species: H. cubanianus

Binomial name
- Hemisinus cubanianus (d'Orbigny, 1841)

= Hemisinus cubanianus =

Species of gastropod

Hemisinus cubanianus is a species of freshwater snail with an operculum. It is an aquatic gastropod mollusc in the family Hemisinidae.

== Distribution ==
Hemisinus cubanianus is endemic to Pinar del Río with scarce distribution in Cuba.
