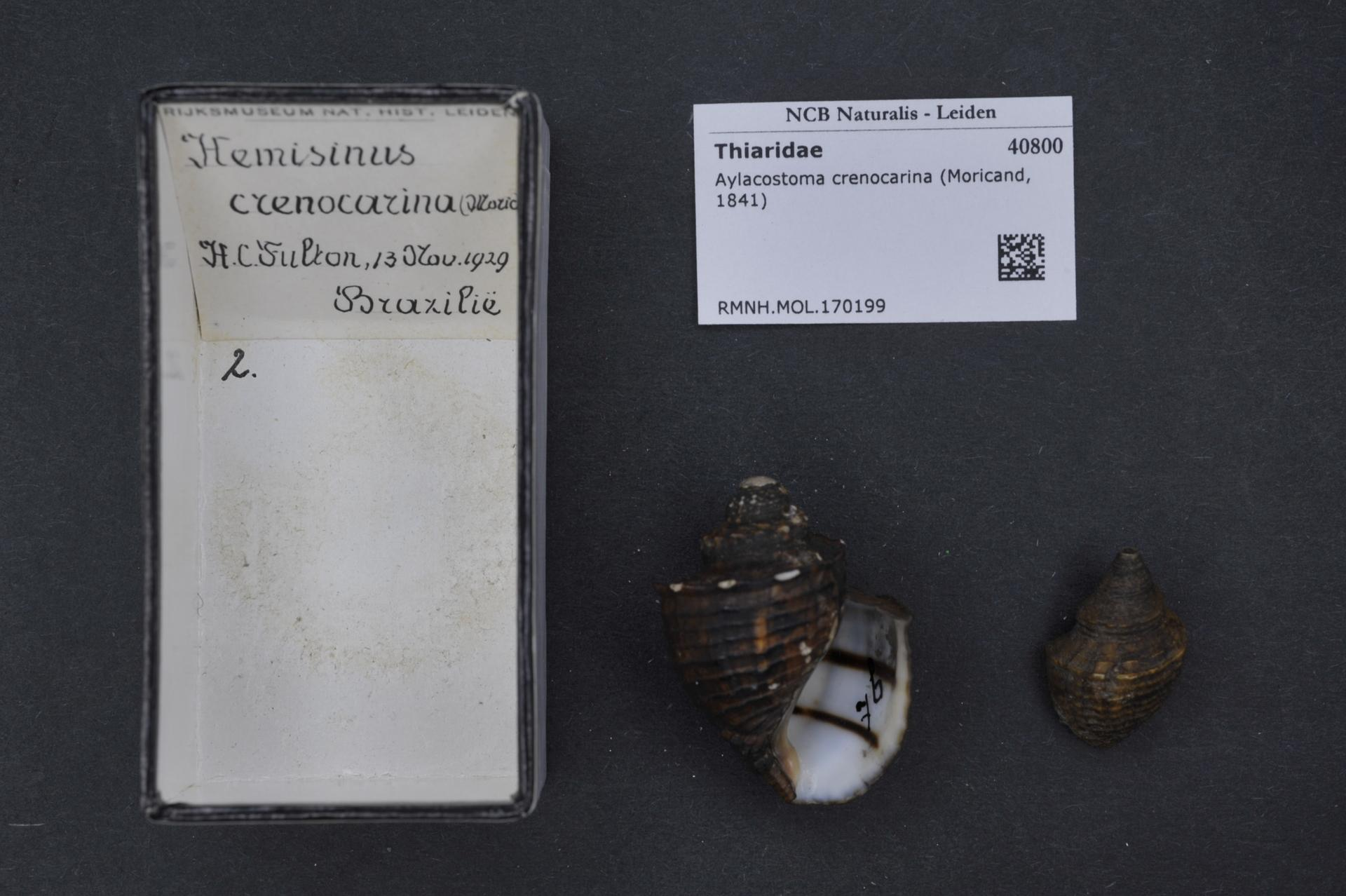
- Aylacostoma crenocarina

Scientific classification
- Kingdom: Animalia
- Phylum: Mollusca
- Class: Gastropoda
- Subclass: Caenogastropoda
- Order: incertae sedis
- Family: Hemisinidae
- Genus: Aylacostoma; Spix, 1827

Type species
- Aylacostoma glabrum Spix, 1827

Diversity
- 32 species

= Aylacostoma =

Genus of gastropods

Aylacostoma is a genus of tropical freshwater snails with an operculum. They are part of the family Hemisinidae, a group of aquatic gastropod molluscs. They are found in South and Central America. As a consequence of the Yacyretá Dam, two species are entirely extinct and another is extinct in the wild.

== Species ==
Species within genus Aylacostoma include:

- Aylacostoma brunneum Vogler & Peso, 2014
- Aylacostoma chloroticum Hylton-Scot, 1953
- Aylacostoma ci Simone, 2001
- Aylacostoma exoplicatum Simone, 2001
- Aylacostoma francanum (Ihering, 1909)
- Aylacostoma glabrum Spix, 1827
- Aylacostoma guaraniticum Hylton-Scot, 1953
- Aylacostoma osculati (Villa, 1857) - synonym: Hemisinus osculati
- Aylacostoma stigmaticum Hylton-Scot, 1953
- Aylacostoma tenuilabris (Reeve, 1860)

== Distribution ==
The native distribution of this genus includes Central and South America.

== Life habits ==
Some species in this genus used to live in areas of white water in the Yacyretá Rapids, Paraná River, feeding on the algae that grow attached to the rocks on the bottom. The water in the area is saturated with oxygen, from the fast-moving waters.

Aylacostoma is a parthenogenic species: the population consists of only females, which increase in number by asexual reproduction. The females give birth to a small number of larvae, no more than three, that are born very well developed, so they have the physical strength needed to attach to a rock and resist the strong current.

== Conservation status ==
With the building in 1993 of the Yacyretá Dam, almost all the suitable habitat for Aylacostoma living in this region was flooded. Consequently, A. guaraniticum and A. stigmaticum became entirely extinct, A. brunneum extinct in the wild (survives in captivity), and A. chloroticum restricted to single small wild population and a captive "safety" population. The captive populations of the last two species are jointly managed by the National University of Misiones and Bernardino Rivadavia Natural Sciences Museum.
