= Nanivitrea =

Scientific classification
- Kingdom: Animalia
- Phylum: Mollusca
- Class: Gastropoda
- Subclass: Caenogastropoda
- Order: Littorinimorpha
- Family: Cochliopidae
- Subfamily: Cochliopinae
- Genus: Nanivitrea; Thiele, 1928

Genus of gastropods

Nanivitrea is a genus of small freshwater snails that have an operculum, aquatic gastropod molluscs in the family Cochliopidae.

== Species ==
Species within the genus Nanivitrea include:

- Nanivitrea alcaldei
- Nanivitrea helicoides (Gundlach, 1865)
