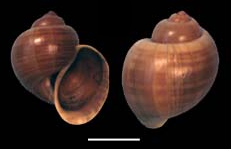
- shell of Pomacea poeyana

Scientific classification
- Kingdom: Animalia
- Phylum: Mollusca
- Class: Gastropoda
- Subclass: Caenogastropoda
- Order: Architaenioglossa
- Family: Ampullariidae
- Genus: Pomacea
- Species: P. poeyana

Binomial name
- Pomacea poeyana (Pilsbry, 1927)

= Pomacea poeyana =

Species of gastropod

Pomacea poeyana is a species of large freshwater snail with gills and an operculum, an aquatic gastropod mollusk in the family Ampullariidae, the apple snails.

== Distribution ==
Pomacea poeyana is endemic to Cuba, where it is well distributed.
