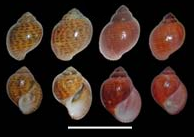
- Two views of four shells of Hemisinus brevis

Scientific classification
- Kingdom: Animalia
- Phylum: Mollusca
- Class: Gastropoda
- Subclass: Caenogastropoda
- Order: incertae sedis
- Family: Hemisinidae
- Genus: Hemisinus
- Species: H. brevis

Binomial name
- Hemisinus brevis (d'Orbigny, 1841)

= Hemisinus brevis =

Species of gastropod

Hemisinus brevis is a species of freshwater snail with an operculum, an aquatic gastropod mollusc in the family Hemisinidae.

== Distribution ==
Hemisinus brevis is endemic to the Pinar del Río with scarce distribution in Cuba.
