= Nanivitrea alcaldei =

Scientific classification
- Kingdom: Animalia
- Phylum: Mollusca
- Class: Gastropoda
- Subclass: Caenogastropoda
- Order: Littorinimorpha
- Family: Hydrobiidae
- Genus: Nanivitrea
- Species: N. alcaldei

Binomial name
- Nanivitrea alcaldei (Jaume & Abbot, 1947)

Species of gastropod

Nanivitrea alcaldei is a species of small freshwater snail that has an operculum, an aquatic gastropod mollusk in the family Hydrobiidae.

== Distribution ==
Nanivitrea alcaldei is endemic to the Cárdenas, Cuba, and has only one known population in Cuba. This species has not been found recently and may no longer exist.

== Description ==
This small snail is less than 3 mm in maximum dimension.
