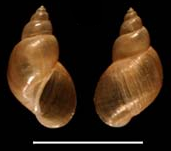
- shells of Galba cubensis

Conservation status
- Least Concern (IUCN 3.1)

- Secure (NatureServe)

Scientific classification
- Kingdom: Animalia
- Phylum: Mollusca
- Class: Gastropoda
- Superorder: Hygrophila
- Family: Lymnaeidae
- Genus: Galba
- Species: G. cubensis

Binomial name
- Galba cubensis (Pfeiffer, 1839)

Synonyms
- List: Fossaria (Bakerilymnaea) cubensis (Pfeiffer, 1839); Fossaria cubensis (Pfeiffer, 1839); Galba (Bakerilymnaea) cubensis (Pfeiffer, 1839); Galba (Galba) doddsi Baker, 1911; Galba doddsi Baker, 1911; Limnaea cubensis (Pfeiffer, 1839); Limnaeus cubensis Pfeiffer, 1839; Limnophysa lecontii (Lea, 1864); Lymnaea (Galba) cubensis (Pfeiffer, 1839); Lymnaea cubensis (Pfeiffer, 1839); Lymnaea cubensis aspirans Pilsbry, 1910; Lymnaea lecontii Lea, 1864; Lymnaeus cubensis (Pfeiffer, 1839); Stagnicola (Bakerilymnaea) cubensis (Pfeiffer, 1839)

= Galba cubensis =

Species of gastropod

Galba cubensis is a species of air-breathing freshwater snail, an aquatic gastropod mollusk in the family Lymnaeidae, the pond snails.

== Distribution ==
Galba cubensis is native to parts of South America, Mexico, the southern Coastal Plain of North America, and the West Indies, including Cuba.
