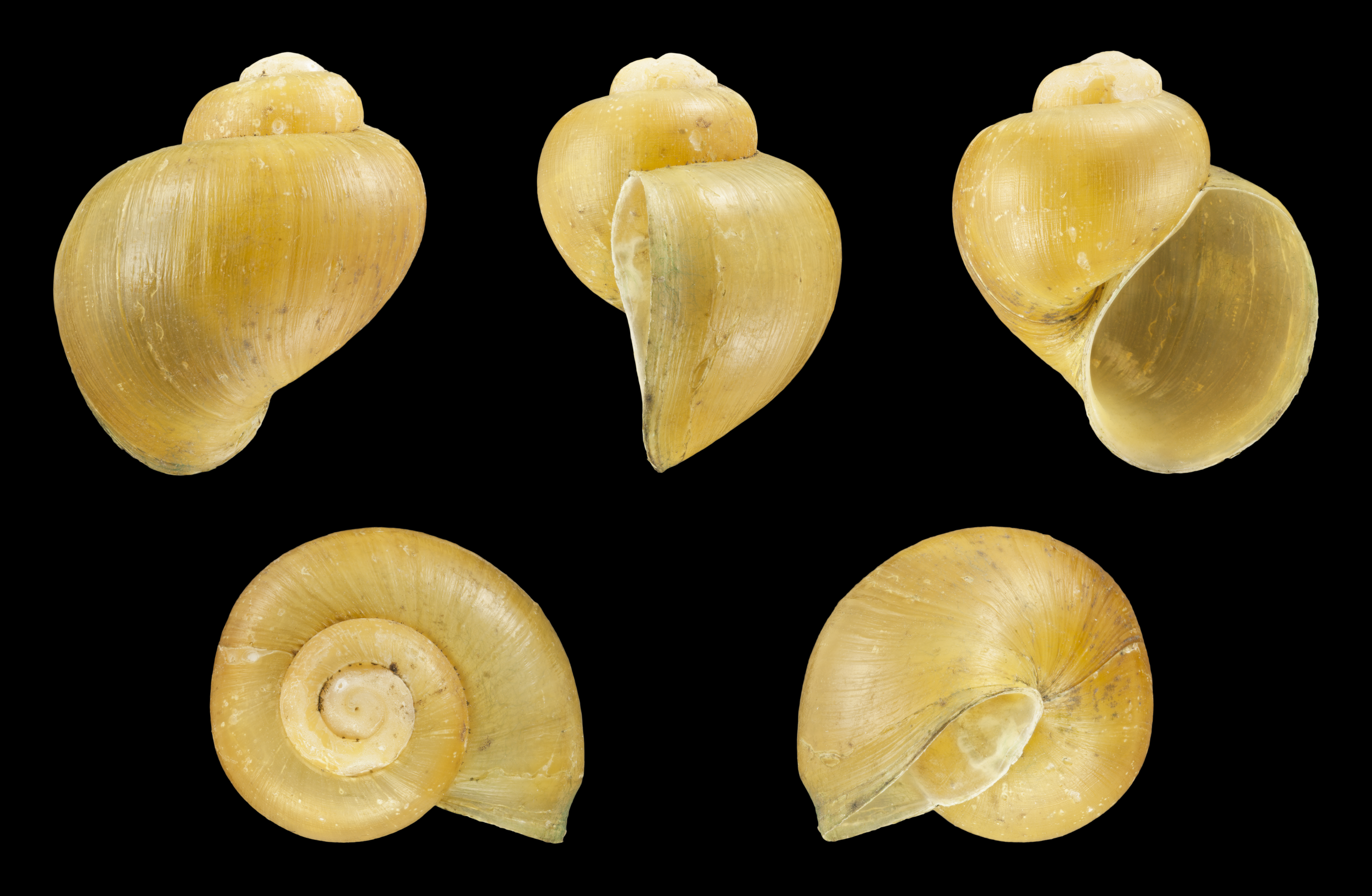

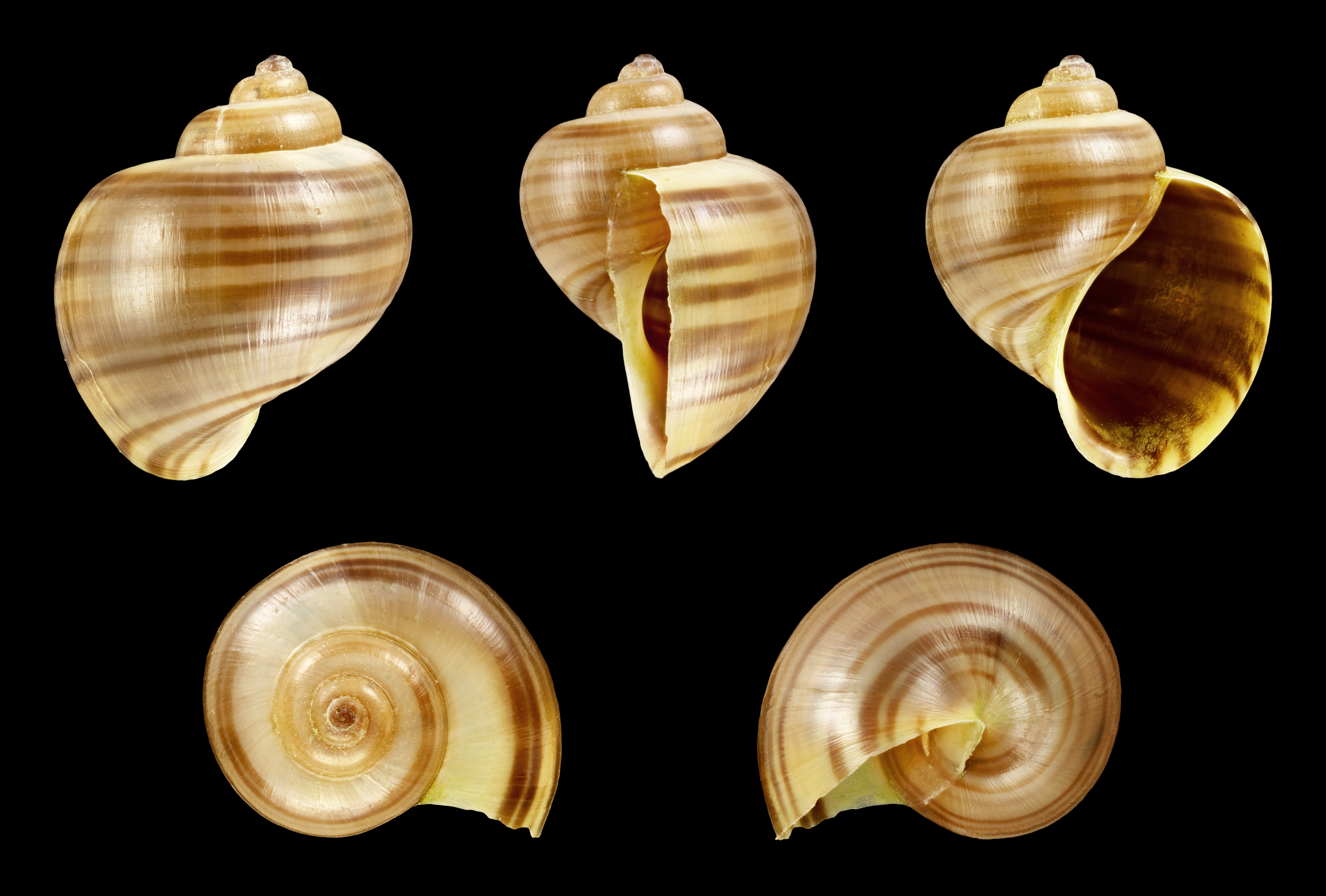
- Pomacea diffusa shell

Scientific classification
- Kingdom: Animalia
- Phylum: Mollusca
- Class: Gastropoda
- Subclass: Caenogastropoda
- Order: Architaenioglossa
- Family: Ampullariidae
- Genus: Pomacea
- Species: P. diffusa

Binomial name
- Pomacea diffusa Linnaeus, 1758

= Pomacea diffusa =

Species of gastropod

Pomacea diffusa, common name the spike-topped apple snail or Mystery Snail, is a species of freshwater snail, an aquatic gastropod mollusk in the family Ampullariidae, the apple snails.

== Taxonomy ==
Pomacea diffusa was originally described as a subspecies of Pomacea bridgesii. Pain (1960) argued that Pomacea bridgesii bridgesii was a larger form with a restricted range, with the smaller Pomacea bridgesii diffusa being the common form throughout the Amazon Basin (Brazil, Peru, Bolivia). Cowie and Thiengo (2003) suggested that the latter might deserve full species status, and the two taxa have been confirmed as distinct species by genetic analyses.

== Distribution ==
The type locality of Pomacea diffusa is in the city of Santa Cruz de la Sierra, Bolivia, although the species is widespread throughout the Amazon Basin.

Non-indigenous distribution of Pomacea diffusa include:

- Thompson recorded this species (as Pomacea bridgesii) in Florida in Monroe, Miami-Dade, Broward, Palm Beach, and Pinellas Counties. The FLMNH electronic database also lists samples from Alachua County, but records cited from the FLMNH database for Brevard County are in fact from Broward County. Rawlings et al. (2007) also collected this species in Hillsborough and Collier Counties.
- Pomacea diffusa was first recorded in Florida (as Pomacea bridgesii) by William J. Clench. The FLMNH has specimens collected in Palm Beach County in 1967 (FLMNH 20295) and Miami-Dade and Broward Counties in the early 1970s (FLMNH 22175, 222247). Howells et al. (2006) reported its establishment in Mobile, Alabama in 2003.
- Cuba

== Description ==
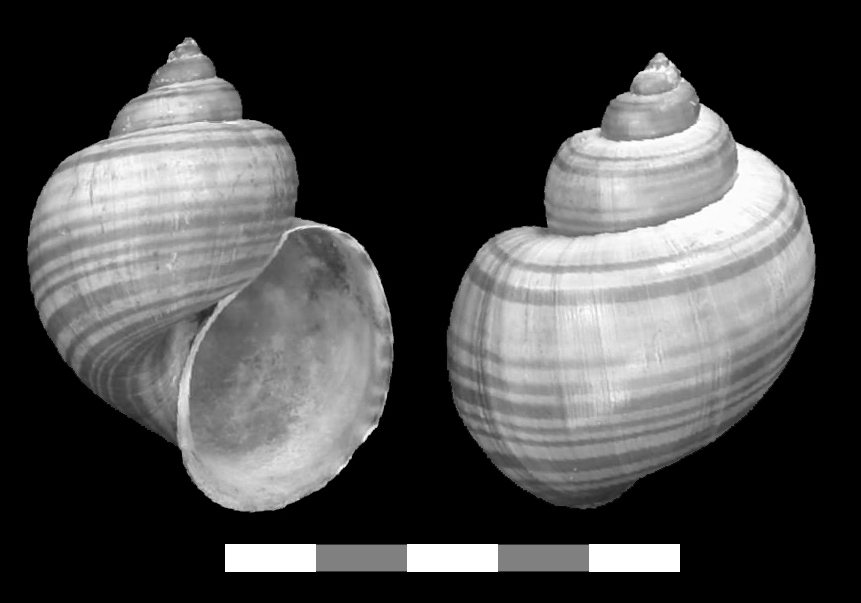
Two views of a shell of Pomacea diffusa

Pomacea diffusa is known as the spike-topped apple snail, because of its relatively raised spire. It lacks a channeled suture, and overlaps in size with the Pomacea paludosa.

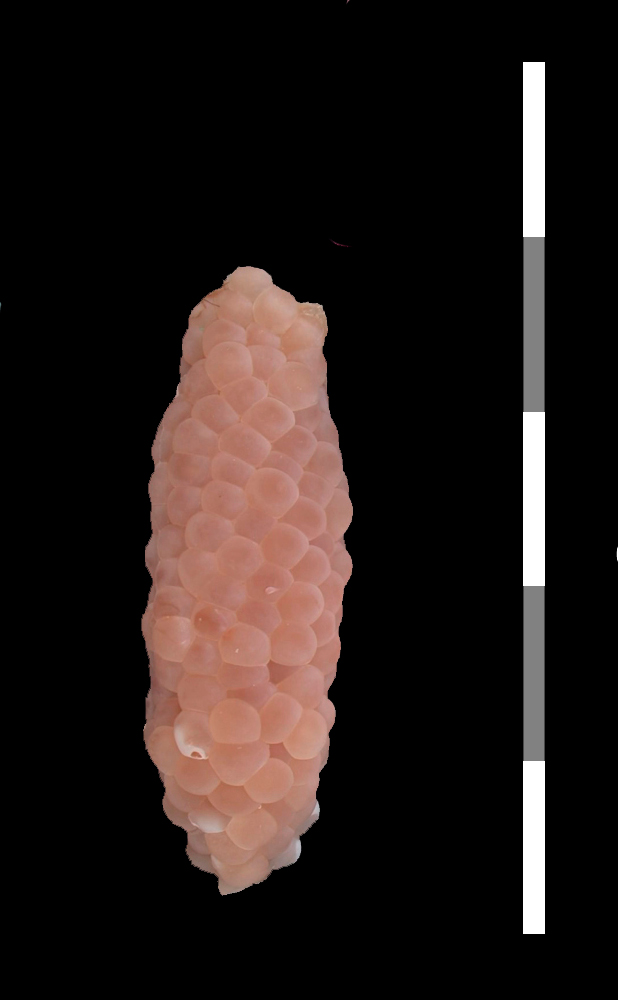
An egg cluster of Pomacea diffusa

The egg masses have an irregular honeycombed appearance, like those of Pomacea haustrum, but are smaller and have a tan to salmon color, although they are white when freshly laid.

== Human use ==
It is a part of ornamental pet trade for freshwater aquaria.

== See also ==
- Algae eater
