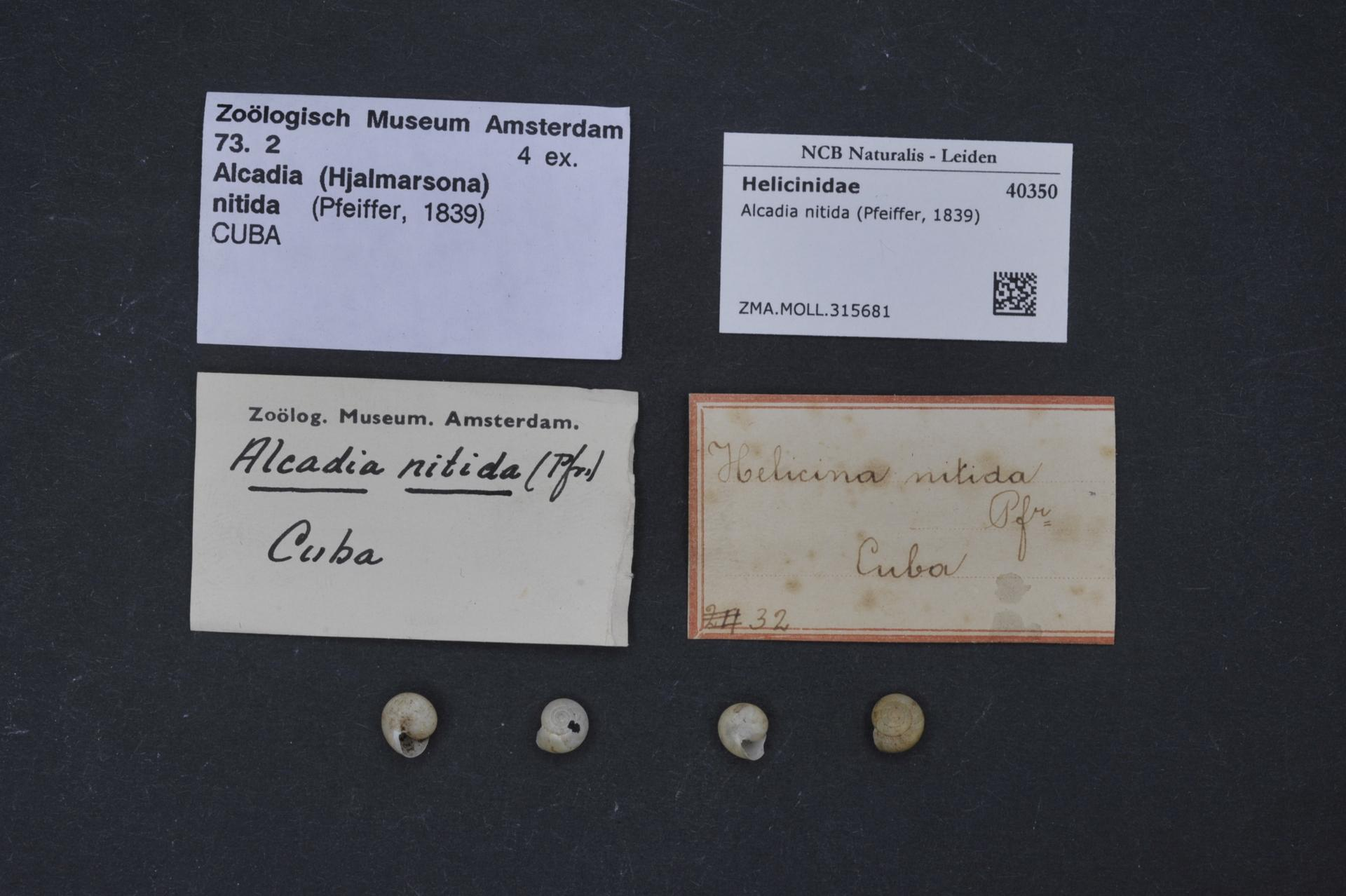
- Shell of Alcadia nitida (specimen at Naturalis Biodiversity Center)

Scientific classification
- Kingdom: Animalia
- Phylum: Mollusca
- Class: Gastropoda
- Order: Cycloneritida
- Family: Helicinidae
- Genus: Alcadia
- Species: A. nitida

Binomial name
- Alcadia nitida (Pfeiffer, 1839)

Synonyms
- Helicina glabra A. Gould, 1842 (junior synonym); Helicina nitida L. Pfeiffer, 1839 (original combination); Helicina nitida var. elatior L. Pfeiffer, 1856 (junior synonym)

= Alcadia nitida =

Species of gastropod

Alcadia nitida is a species of an operculate land snail, terrestrial gastropod mollusk in the family Helicinidae.

== Description ==
The height of the shell reaches 6.8 mm.

(Original description in Latin) The shell is slightly depressed, thin, smooth, and deep flesh-colored. It has a slightly convex shape both above and below, with a pointed apex. It features five whorls that are minutely striated at the suture. The columella is barely calloused. The outer lip is simple, sharp, sinuous, and sharply toothed at the columellar angle. The operculum is thin and pale reddish.

== Distribution ==
This species lives in Cuba.
