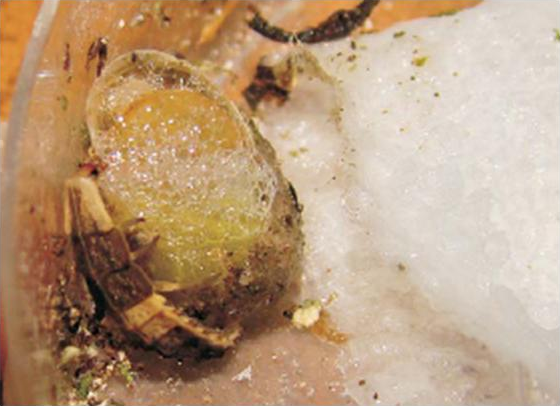
- Foaming behaviour of Helicina aspersa while attacked by a larva of Alecton discoidalis

Scientific classification
- Kingdom: Animalia
- Phylum: Mollusca
- Class: Gastropoda
- Order: Cycloneritida
- Family: Helicinidae
- Genus: Helicina
- Species: H. aspersa

Binomial name
- Helicina aspersa Pfeiffer, 1839

Synonyms
- Helicina adspersa (lapsus)

= Helicina aspersa =

Species of gastropod

Helicina aspersa is a species of a land snail, terrestrial gastropod mollusc in the family Helicinidae.

== Distribution ==
This species lives in Cuba.

== Ecology ==
Helicina aspersa is a tree dwelling species.

Predators of Helicina aspersa include larvae of firefly bug Alecton discoidalis. On some occasions, the Helicina aspersa emit a protective foam which enables them to thwart the attack.
