= Viviparus bermondianus =

Scientific classification
- Kingdom: Animalia
- Phylum: Mollusca
- Class: Gastropoda
- Subclass: Caenogastropoda
- Order: Architaenioglossa
- Family: Viviparidae
- Genus: Viviparus
- Species: V. bermondianus

Binomial name
- Viviparus bermondianus (d'Orbigny, 1842)

Species of gastropod

Viviparus bermondianus is a species of a freshwater snail with gills and an operculum, an aquatic gastropod mollusk in the family Ampullariidae, the apple snails.

== Distribution ==
Viviparus bermondianus is endemic to the Zapata Peninsula, Cuba. It has not been currently found and has perhaps disappeared.
