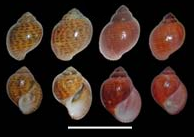
- Two views of four shells of Hemisinus brevis

Scientific classification
- Kingdom: Animalia
- Phylum: Mollusca
- Class: Gastropoda
- Subclass: Caenogastropoda
- Order: incertae sedis
- Family: Hemisinidae
- Genus: Hemisinus; Swainson, 1840

= Hemisinus =

Genus of gastropods

Hemisinus is a genus of freshwater snails with an operculum, aquatic gastropod molluscs in the family Hemisinidae.

== Species ==
Species within the genus Hemisinus include:

- Hemisinus brevis
- Hemisinus cubanianus
- Hemisinus lineolatus
