= Aylacostoma stigmaticum =

Conservation status
- Extinct in the Wild (IUCN 2.3)

Scientific classification
- Kingdom: Animalia
- Phylum: Mollusca
- Class: Gastropoda
- Subclass: Caenogastropoda
- Order: incertae sedis
- Family: Hemisinidae
- Genus: Aylacostoma
- Species: A. stigmaticum

Binomial name
- Aylacostoma stigmaticum Hylton Scott, 1953

Species of gastropod

Aylacostoma stigmaticum is a species of freshwater snail, aquatic gastropod mollusc in the family Hemisinidae. This species disappeared after the building of the Yacyretá Dam on the Paraná River, in between Argentina and Paraguay. Although listed as extinct in the wild by the IUCN, no captive population survives meaning that it now is entirely extinct.

== See also ==
- List of non-marine molluscs of Argentina
