= Aylacostoma guaraniticum =

Conservation status
- Extinct in the Wild (IUCN 2.3)

Scientific classification
- Kingdom: Animalia
- Phylum: Mollusca
- Class: Gastropoda
- Subclass: Caenogastropoda
- Order: incertae sedis
- Family: Hemisinidae
- Genus: Aylacostoma
- Species: A. guaraniticum

Binomial name
- Aylacostoma guaraniticum Hylton-Scot, 1953

Species of gastropod

Aylacostoma guaraniticum is a species of freshwater snail, an aquatic gastropod mollusc in the family Hemisinidae. This species disappeared after the building of the Yacyretá Dam on the Paraná River, in between Argentina and Paraguay. Although listed as extinct in the wild by the IUCN, no captive population survives meaning that it now is entirely extinct.
