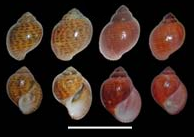
- Hemisinus brevis

Scientific classification
- Kingdom: Animalia
- Phylum: Mollusca
- Class: Gastropoda
- Subclass: Caenogastropoda
- Order: incertae sedis
- Superfamily: Cerithioidea
- Family: Hemisinidae; P. Fischer & Crosse, 1891

Synonyms
- Aylacostomatinae Parodiz, 1969; Hemisininae P. Fischer & Crosse, 1891 (ranked as subfamily); Pachymelaniidae Bandel & Kowalke, 1999

= Hemisinidae =

Hemisinidae Temporal range: Tithonian (Late Jurassic)–recent 149.2–0 Ma

Family of gastropods

Hemisinidae is a family of snails in the superfamily Cerithioidea. They occur in freshwater and brackish environments on all continents except Australia and Antarctica.

== Genera ==
There are five extant genera:

- Aylacostoma Spix, 1827
- Cubaedomus Thiele, 1928
- Hemisinus Swainson, 1840
- Longiverena Pilsbry & Olsson, 1935
- Pachymelania E. A. Smith, 1893

There are also four genera only known from fossils:

- † Axonella Pacaud, Lhomme & Renaud, 2021
- † Gantmelania Kowalke, 2001
- † Pyrgulifera Meek, 1871
- † Stephaniphera S. Schneider, Kollmann & Pickford, 2020

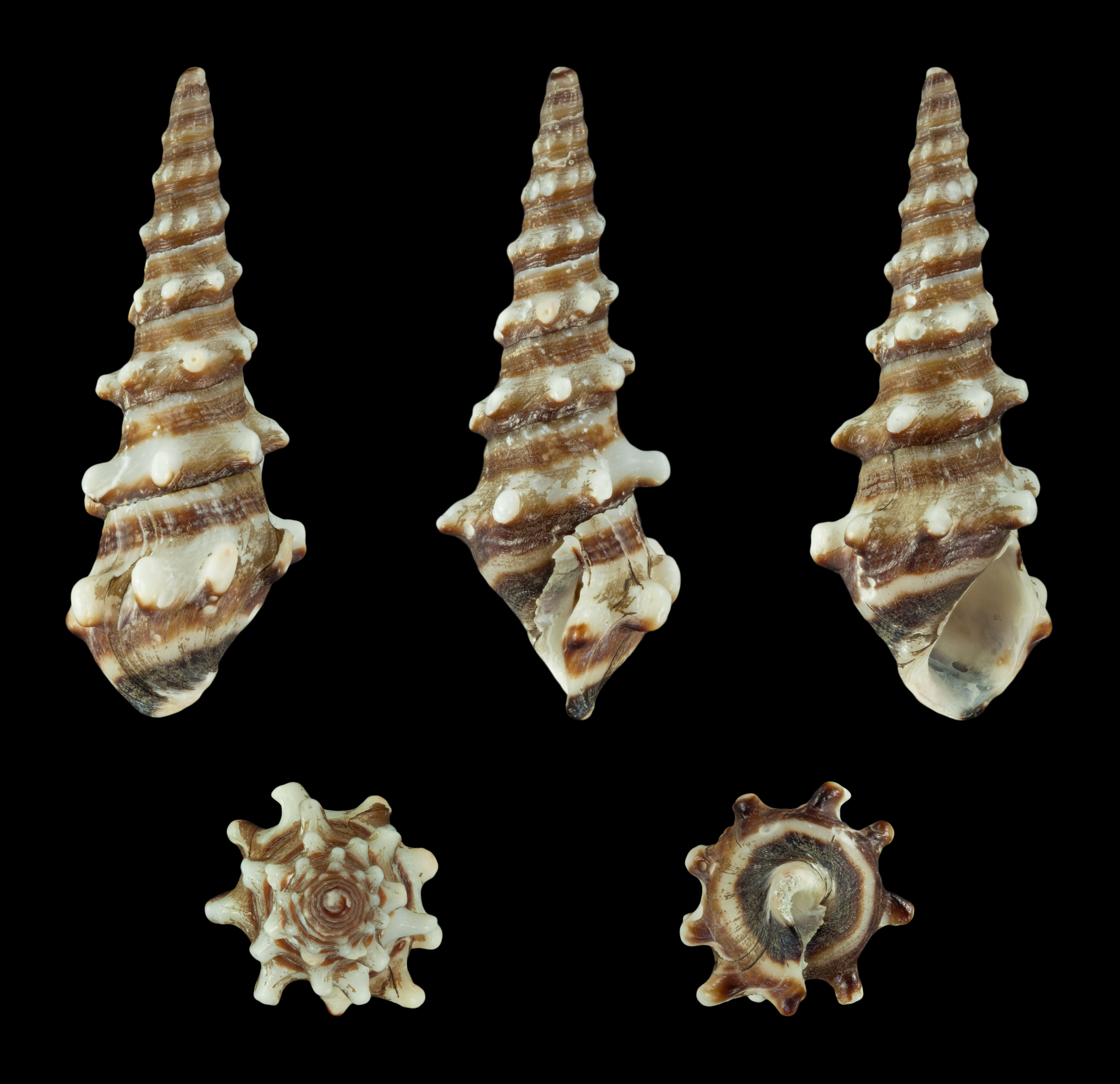
Pachymelania aurita
