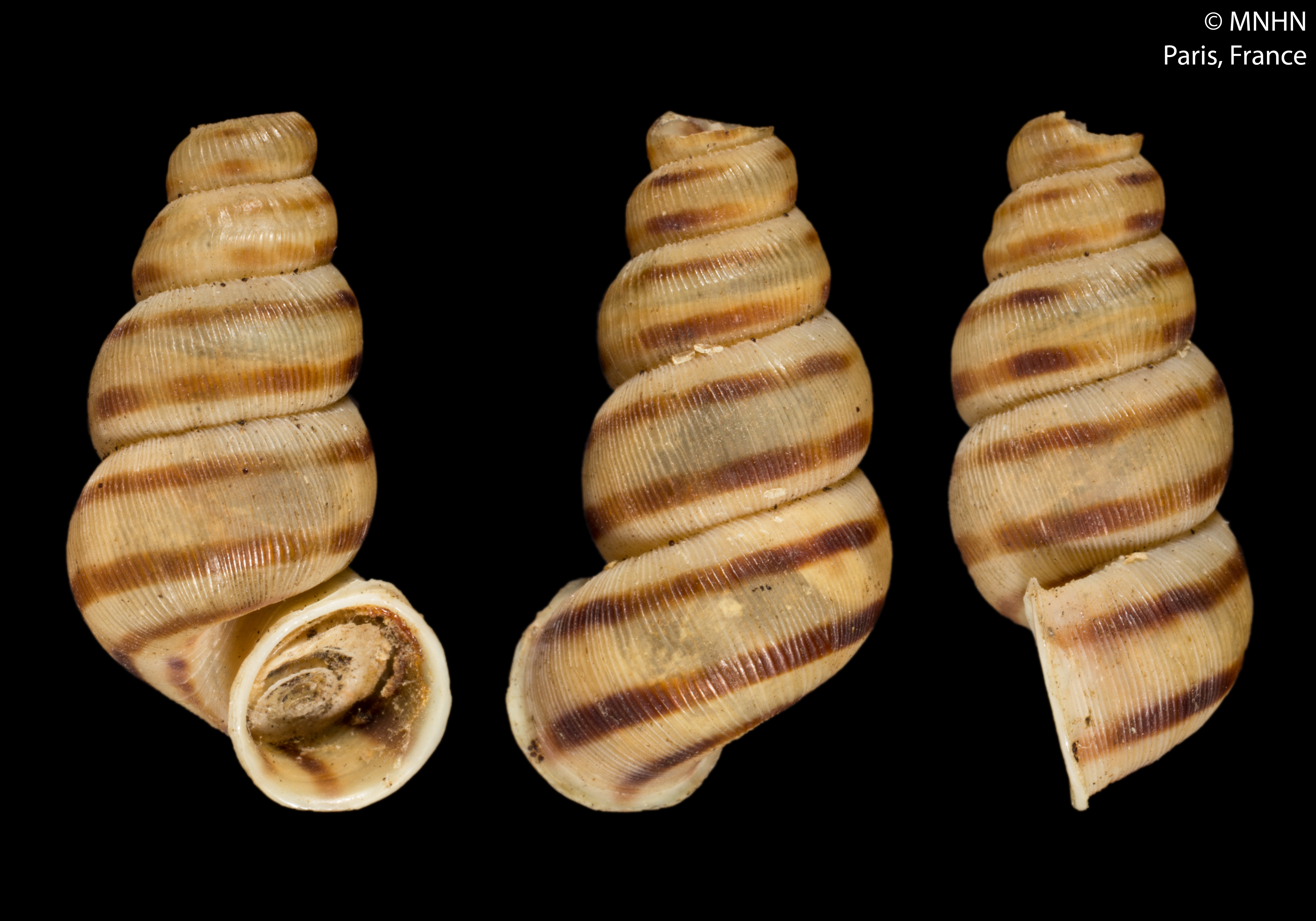
- Shell of Eucalodium sumichrasti (syntype at MNHN, Paris)

Scientific classification
- Kingdom: Animalia
- Phylum: Mollusca
- Class: Gastropoda
- Order: Stylommatophora
- Suborder: Helicina
- Infraorder: Helicina
- Superfamily: Urocoptoidea
- Family: Eucalodiidae; Crosse & P. Fischer, 1868

Synonyms
- Eucalodium (Bradyplax) F.G. Thompson, 2014· accepted, alternate representation; Eucalodium (Eucalodium) Crosse & P. Fischer, 1868· accepted, alternate representation; Eucalodium (Oligostylus) Pilsbry, 1895· accepted, alternate representation; Eucalodium (Ptychocentrum) Bartsch, 1943· accepted, alternate representation; Eucalodium (Resupinata) E. von Martens, 1897· accepted, alternate representation; Eucolodium misspelling - incorrect subsequent spelling; Eucolodium (Oligostylus) Pilsbry, 1895 misspelling - incorrect subsequent spelling; Oligostylus Pilsbry, 1895 (unaccepted rank); Thaumasia Albers, 1850

= Eucalodium =

Genus of gastropods

Eucalodium is a genus of land snails in the family Eucalodiidae.

== Species ==
- Eucalodium australis F. G. Thompson, 1963
- Eucalodium blandianum Crosse & P. Fischer, 1868
- Eucalodium cereum Strebel, 1880
- Eucalodium compactum Pilsbry, 1893
- Eucalodium decollatum (Nyst, 1841)
- Eucalodium decurtatum (H. Adams, 1872)
- Eucalodium densecostatum Strebel, 1880
- Eucalodium deshayesianum Crosse & P. Fischer, 1872
- Eucalodium edwardsianum Crosse & P. Fischer, 1872
- † Eucalodium eophilum Cockerell, 1915
- Eucalodium grande (L. Pfeiffer, 1860)
- Eucalodium hegewischi (Bartsch, 1947)
- Eucalodium hippocastaneum Dall, 1897
- Eucalodium insigne Crosse & P. Fischer, 1872
- Eucalodium ischnostele (Pilsbry, 1909)
- Eucalodium mariae (Bartsch, 1947)
- Eucalodium marianum (Bartsch, 1943)
- Eucalodium mexicanum (L. Pfeiffer, 1860)
- Eucalodium moussonianum Crosse & P. Fischer, 1872
- Eucalodium neglectum Crosse & P. Fischer, 1872
- Eucalodium otoides F. G. Thompson, 1968
- Eucalodium speciosum (Dunker, 1844)
- Eucalodium splendidum (L. Pfeiffer, 1860)
- Eucalodium sumichrasti Crosse & P. Fischer, 1878
- Eucalodium walpoleanum Crosse & P. Fischer, 1872

Species brought into synonymy

- Eucalodium dalli E. von Martens, 1901: synonym of Anisospira dalli (E. von Martens, 1901) (original combination)
- Eucalodium vonmartensi Strebel, 1880: synonym of Anisospira vonmartensi (Strebel, 1880) (original combination)
