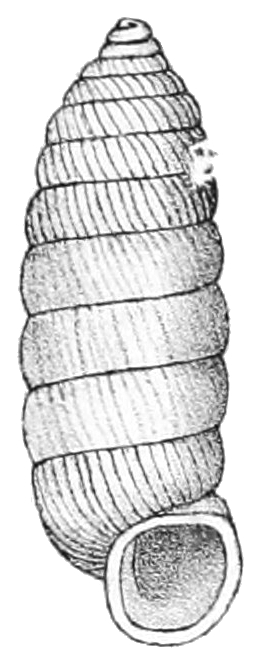
- Drawing of the apertural view of a shell of Holospira arizonensis

Conservation status
- Imperiled (NatureServe)

Scientific classification
- Kingdom: Animalia
- Phylum: Mollusca
- Class: Gastropoda
- Order: Stylommatophora
- Family: Urocoptidae
- Genus: Holospira
- Species: H. arizonensis

Binomial name
- Holospira arizonensis Stearns, 1890

= Holospira arizonensis =

Species of gastropod

Holospira arizonensis, common name the Arizona holospira, is a species of air-breathing land snail, a terrestrial pulmonate gastropod mollusk in the family Urocoptidae.

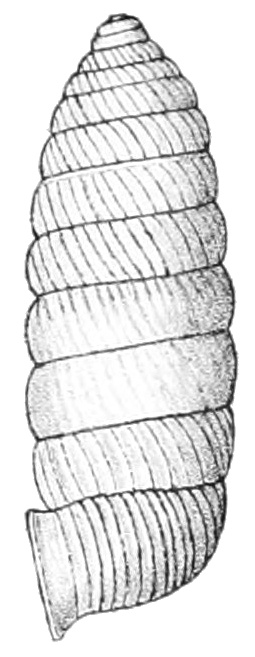
Lateral view of a shell of Holospira arizonensis.
