= Eucalodiidae =

Scientific classification
- Kingdom: Animalia
- Phylum: Mollusca
- Class: Gastropoda
- Order: Stylommatophora
- Suborder: Helicina
- Infraorder: Helicina
- Superfamily: Urocoptoidea
- Family: Eucalodiidae; P. Fischer & Crosse, 1873

Family of gastropods

Eucalodiidae is a family of air-breathing land snails, terrestrial gastropod mollusks in the superfamily Urocoptoidea.

== Genera ==
Genera in the family Eucalodiidae include:

- Anisospira Strebel & Pfeffer, 1880
- Caerbannogia Salvador, Ferreira-Santos, Cavallari & Bichuette, 2025
- Coelocentrum Crosse & P. Fischer, 1872
- †Condonella McLellan, 1927
- Dissotropis Bartsch, 1906
- Eucalodium Crosse & P. Fischer, 1868

Genera brought into synonymy

- Liocentrum Pilsbry, 1902: synonym of Coelocentrum (Gymnocentrum) Pilsbry, 1942 represented as Coelocentrum Crosse & P. Fischer, 1872
- Liocentrum Pilsbry, 1902: synonym of Coelocentrum (Gymnocentrum) Pilsbry, 1942 represented as Coelocentrum Crosse & P. Fischer, 1872 (junior homonym, non Liocentrum Karsch, 1890 )
- Oligostylus Pilsbry, 1895: synonym of Eucalodium (Oligostylus) Pilsbry, 1895 represented as Eucalodium Crosse & P. Fischer, 1868 (unaccepted rank)
- Thaumasia Albers, 1850: synonym of Eucalodium Crosse & P. Fischer, 1868

== Distribution ==
Eucalodiidae are found in Caribbean and Central America.
