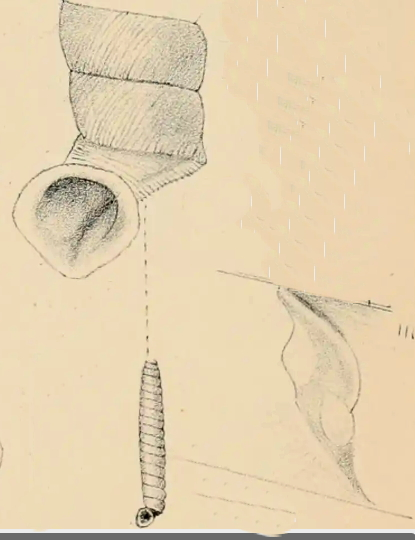
- Shell of Apoma diminutum

Scientific classification
- Kingdom: Animalia
- Phylum: Mollusca
- Class: Gastropoda
- Order: Stylommatophora
- Family: Urocoptidae
- Genus: Apoma
- Species: A. diminutum

Binomial name
- Apoma diminutum (C. B. Adams, 1851)

Synonyms
- Brachypodella (Mychostoma) diminuta Pilsbry, 1903 (junior synonym); Cylindrella agnesiana var. diminuta C. B. Adams, 1851 (original combination)

= Apoma diminutum =

Species of gastropod

Apoma diminutum is a species of air-breathing land snails, terrestrial pulmonate gastropod molluscs in the subfamily Brachypodellinae of the family Urocoptidae.

== Description ==
At full size, one measured shell is 19 mm long and 2.7 mm in diameter with 15 whorls; another is 17 mm long and 2.75 mm wide, also with 15 whorls.

(Described as Brachypodella (Mychostoma) diminuta) The shell is pillar‑shaped, only slightly tapering, and truncate at the apex. It is thin and whitish. The surface is densely sculptured with extremely narrow, thread‑like, oblique, opaque‑white striae that stand out against a translucent grey ground. The whorls are convex, and the posterior part of the body whorl projects freely.

The neck is squarish and is pinched into a strong basal keel; the peripheral keel is wider. Above, the shell is angular, while the columellar side is strongly convex. The aperture is rounded but becomes angular outwardly and below, and it is channelled within. The outer lip is thin, expanded, and reflexed.

The columella is slender and simple in its upper part, but becomes thicker in the lower half. Here it carries an upper and a lower series of oblique nodes that end in hooks, the two series lying opposite one another and directed toward each other.

== Distribution ==
This snail occurs on Jamaica.
