= Holospira yucatanensis =

Conservation status
- Critically Imperiled (NatureServe)

Scientific classification
- Kingdom: Animalia
- Phylum: Mollusca
- Class: Gastropoda
- Order: Stylommatophora
- Family: Urocoptidae
- Genus: Holospira
- Species: H. yucatanensis

Binomial name
- Holospira yucatanensis Bartsch, 1906

Species of gastropod

Holospira yucatanensis, common name Bartsch holospira, is a species of air-breathing land snail, a terrestrial pulmonate gastropod mollusk in the family Urocoptidae.

== Distribution ==
This species occurs in Texas, USA.
