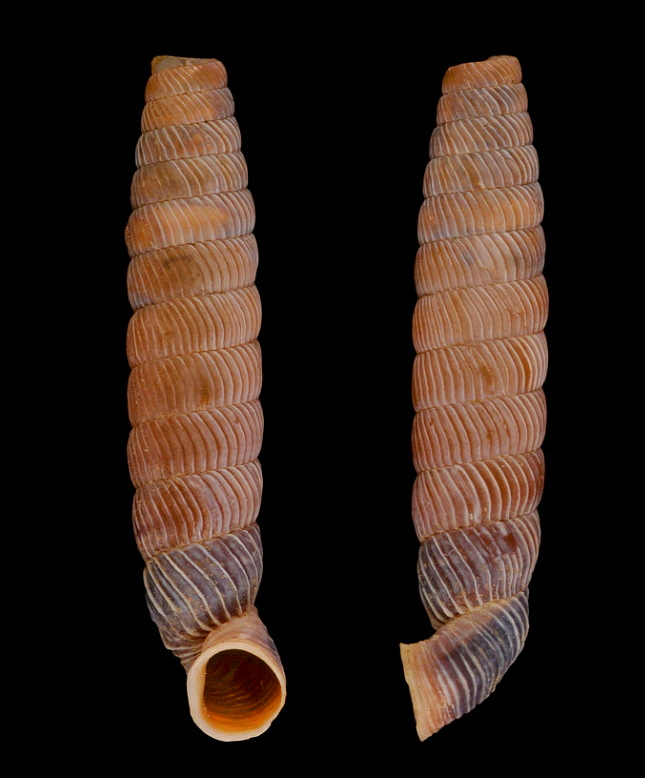
- Shell of Badiofaux trilamellata tomasensis (syntype at the Smithsonian Institution)

Scientific classification
- Kingdom: Animalia
- Phylum: Mollusca
- Class: Gastropoda
- Order: Stylommatophora
- Family: Urocoptidae
- Genus: Badiofaux
- Species: B. trilamellata

Binomial name
- Badiofaux trilamellata (L. Pfeiffer, 1864)

Synonyms
- Cylindrella trilamellata L. Pfeiffer, 1864

= Badiofaux trilamellata =

Species of gastropods

Badiofaux trilamellata is a species of land snail, a terrestrial gastropod mollusk in the family Urocoptidae.

Subspecies

- Badiofaux trilamellata tomasensis C. de la Torre & Bartsch, 1972
- Badiofaux trilamellata trilamellata (L. Pfeiffer, 1864)

== Description ==
The length of the shell varies between 19 mm and 20 mm, mm, its diameter is 4 mm.

(Original description in Latin) The shell is slightly rimate, cylindrically turreted, and rather solid. It is sculptured with curved rib-like striae. It is violet in color. The spire tapers slowly upward and ends in a truncated apex. There are 12 remaining whorls, which are moderately convex; the body whorl is very briefly detached and is very obscurely subcarinate at the base. The aperture is only slightly oblique, subcircular, and dark brown within, and it is provided with a deep columellar fold. The peristome is continuous, somewhat expanded, and whitish. The internal columella is obliquely coiled by three nearly equal lamellae.

== Distribution ==
This species occurs in Cuba.
