= Brachypodella caymanensis =

Scientific classification
- Kingdom: Animalia
- Phylum: Mollusca
- Class: Gastropoda
- Order: Stylommatophora
- Family: Urocoptidae
- Genus: Brachypodella
- Species: B. caymanensis

Binomial name
- Brachypodella caymanensis Pilsbry, 1930

Synonyms
- Brachypodella (Cyclauchen) caymanensis Pilsbry, 1930 (unaccepted combination); Brachypodella erratica Pilsbry, 1930 (junior synonym)

Species of gastropod

Brachypodella caymanensis is a species of air-breathing land snails, terrestrial pulmonate gastropod molluscs in the subfamily Brachypodellinae of the family Urocoptidae.

== Description ==
The length of the shell attains 7.3 mm, its diameter 1.8 mm.

(Original description) The slender, fusiform shell is pale brown, narrowly truncate, leaving 10.5 strongly convex whorls. The last half of the body whorl descends more rapidly, is free, rounded and without angulation. The first half whorl is prominent, smooth, the next two embryonic whorls are very finely and regularly striate axially. Postembryonic whorls are more convex. Their sculpture consists of somewhat retractive ribs narrower than their intervals; on the penultimate whorl about 30 ribs, the intervals twice the width of the ribs. The aperture is subcircular, somewhat oblique; the peristome is reflected, narrower in the outer margin, giving the opening a shortly ovate shape. The internal axis is slender, straight and smooth.

== Distribution ==
This snail occurs in the Cayman Islands.
