= Holospira goldfussi =

Conservation status
- Imperiled (NatureServe)

Scientific classification
- Kingdom: Animalia
- Phylum: Mollusca
- Class: Gastropoda
- Order: Stylommatophora
- Family: Urocoptidae
- Genus: Holospira
- Species: H. goldfussi

Binomial name
- Holospira goldfussi (Menke, 1847)

Species of gastropod

Holospira goldfussi, common name the New Braunfels holospira, is a species of air-breathing land snail, a terrestrial pulmonate gastropod mollusk in the family Urocoptidae.

The common name of this species is based on the city of New Braunfels, Texas which was founded only two years before the snail was officially named and described.

== Subspecies ==
- Holospira goldfussi anacachensis Bartsch

== Distribution ==
This species occurs in Texas, USA.
