= Brachypodella bourguignatiana =

Scientific classification
- Kingdom: Animalia
- Phylum: Mollusca
- Class: Gastropoda
- Order: Stylommatophora
- Family: Urocoptidae
- Genus: Brachypodella
- Species: B. bourguignatiana

Binomial name
- Brachypodella bourguignatiana (Ancey, 1886)

Synonyms
- Cylindrella bourguignatiana Ancey, 1886 superseded combination

Species of gastropod

Brachypodella bourguignatiana is a species of air-breathing land snails, terrestrial pulmonate gastropod molluscs in the subfamily Brachypodellinae of the family Urocoptidae.

== Description ==
The height of the decollated shell is 11.5 mm; its maximum diameter is 3 mm; and the aperture measures almost 2 mm in both height and width externally.

(Original description in Latin) The shell is elongate, cylindrical to slightly fusiform, rather slender, pale horn-coloured, and somewhat glossy, with the apex truncated.

The spire tapers gradually towards the summit and is ornamented with sharp, oblique, rib-like lamellae. After decollation, there are 9–10 whorls, which increase slowly and regularly in size. They are moderately convex, separated by a distinctly impressed linear suture that is slightly crenulate and nearly horizontal.

The body whorl is slightly narrower than the preceding ones. At its base it is bordered on each side by a crenulate angle, which forms a shallow channel, especially near the termination. Below this angle the surface is striate, while towards the aperture it becomes more closely ribbed. The periphery is only faintly rounded. Anteriorly, the body whorl is strongly produced and detached from the preceding whorl, the free portion descending distinctly.

The aperture is nearly straight, tubular, and subcircular, although it is slightly distorted on the right side by one blunt median angle and a second blunt angle situated below the base. The peristome is continuous, somewhat thickened, entirely white, and slightly expanded and reflected.

== Distribution ==
This snail occurs in Honduras.
