= Brachypodella angulifera =

Scientific classification
- Kingdom: Animalia
- Phylum: Mollusca
- Class: Gastropoda
- Order: Stylommatophora
- Family: Urocoptidae
- Genus: Brachypodella
- Species: B. angulifera

Binomial name
- Brachypodella angulifera (L. Pfeiffer, 1858)

Synonyms
- Brachypodella (Brevipedella) angulifera (L. Pfeiffer, 1858) alternative representation; Cylindrella angulifera L. Pfeiffer, 1858 superseded combination

Species of gastropod

Brachypodella angulifera is a species of air-breathing land snails, terrestrial pulmonate gastropod molluscs in the subfamily Brachypodellinae of the family Urocoptidae.

== Description ==
The shell reaches a length of 10 mm and a diameter of about 2⅓ mm; the maximum diameter of the aperture is likewise about 2⅓ mm.

(Original description in Latin) The shell is narrowly umbilicate (with only a slight chink) and cylindrically turreted, with the apex truncated. It is rather thin and is sculptured with crowded, thread‑like, slightly arched striae, giving it a silky surface; the colour is whitish. The spire is slightly curved in outline and ends in a truncation. The suture is deep. There are 9.5 remaining whorls, which are convex; the body whorl is briefly free and has a somewhat compressed base.

The aperture is oblique and almost circular, but it is drawn out into an angle on the right side. The peristome is continuous and is shortly reflexed all around.

== Distribution ==
This snail occurs on Cuba.
