= Badiofaux plumbea =

Scientific classification
- Kingdom: Animalia
- Phylum: Mollusca
- Class: Gastropoda
- Order: Stylommatophora
- Family: Urocoptidae
- Genus: Badiofaux
- Species: B. plumbea

Binomial name
- Badiofaux plumbea (L. Pfeiffer, 1864)

Synonyms
- Cylindrella plumbea L. Pfeiffer, 1864

Species of gastropods

Badiofaux plumbea is a species of land snail, a terrestrial gastropod mollusk in the family Urocoptidae.

== Description ==
The length of the shell varies between 17 mm and 18 mm, mm, its diameter is 2⅔ mm.

(Original description in Latin) The shell is slightly rimate, cylindrically turreted, and rather solid. It is sculptured with curved, rather closely set rib-like striae. Its color is dark leaden brown. The spire tapers slowly upward and ends in a truncated apex. It has 12 remaining whorls, which are moderately convex; the body whorl is somewhat long and detached, descends, is rounded, is grooved above, and broadens anteriorly. The aperture is oblique and circular, and it is dark brown within. The peristome is white and expands evenly all around. The internal columella bears a distinct single lamella that projects only slightly, together with another obsolete, spiral lamella.

== Distribution ==
This species occurs in Cuba.
