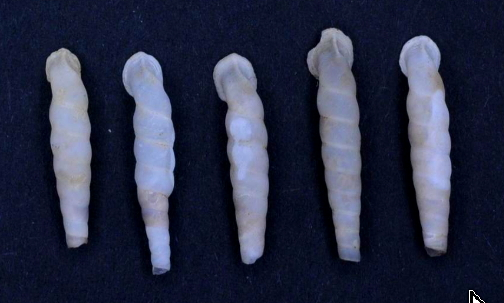
- Shells of Apoma chemnitzianum (specimens at Naturalis Biodiversity Center)

Scientific classification
- Kingdom: Animalia
- Phylum: Mollusca
- Class: Gastropoda
- Order: Stylommatophora
- Family: Urocoptidae
- Genus: Apoma
- Species: A. chemnitzianum

Binomial name
- Apoma chemnitzianum ((A. Férussac, 1821)

Synonyms
- Apoma elongata H. Beck, 1837 (junior synonym); Cylindrella cumingii C. B. Adams, 1845 (junior synonym); Helix chemnitziana A. Férussac, 1821 (original combination)

= Apoma chemnitzianum =

Species of gastropod

Apoma chemnitzianum is a species of air-breathing land snails, terrestrial pulmonate gastropod molluscs in the subfamily Brachypodellinae of the family Urocoptidae.

== Description ==
(Described in Latin as Cylindrella cumingii) The shell is large and white, and has a slightly fusiform outline; it is very long and heterostrophic (the early and later whorls coil in opposite directions). It is richly ornamented with very numerous, very small, oblique, regular, rounded ribs. The apex is broadly decollate, with whorls 10 or 11 whorls; the remaining upper whorls are very strongly convex, and in total about 8 or 9 whorls persist below the decollation.

The aperture is elliptical and markedly constricted deep within the throat, but it expands outward into a very broad, sharp outer lip. The body whorl is provided with a semi‑revolving keel that helps to form a somewhat effuse aperture.

== Distribution ==
This snail occurs on Jamaica.
