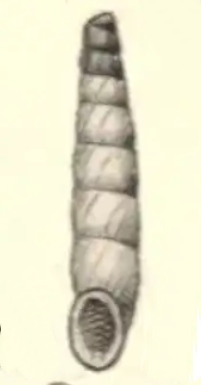
- Shell of Apoma gracile (holotype)

Scientific classification
- Kingdom: Animalia
- Phylum: Mollusca
- Class: Gastropoda
- Order: Stylommatophora
- Family: Urocoptidae
- Genus: Apoma
- Species: A. gracile

Binomial name
- Apoma gracile (W. Wood, 1828)

Synonyms
- Turbo gracilis W. Wood, 1828 (original combination)

= Apoma gracile =

Species of gastropod

Apoma gracile is a species of air-breathing land snails, terrestrial, pulmonate, gastropod molluscs in the subfamily Brachypodellinae of the family Urocoptidae.

== Taxonomy ==
There is a senior homonym, Turbo gracilis Brocchi, 1814, omitted by Pilbsry, 1903 in discussion of Apoma gracile (W. Wood, 1828).

== Description ==
The length of the shell attains 27 mm.

== Distribution ==
This tree snail occurs on Jamaica.
