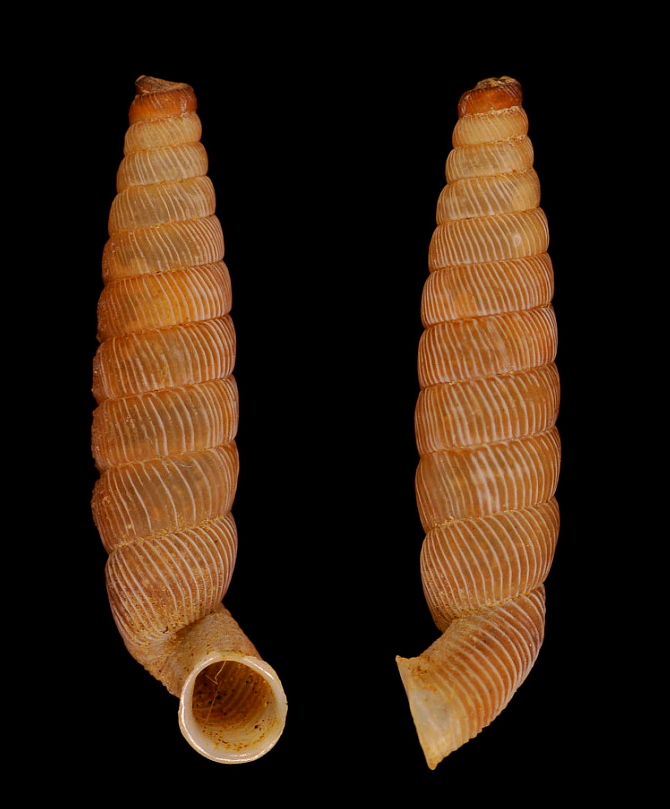
- Shell of Badiofaux mogotensis (syntype at the Smithsonian Institution)

Scientific classification
- Kingdom: Animalia
- Phylum: Mollusca
- Class: Gastropoda
- Order: Stylommatophora
- Family: Urocoptidae
- Genus: Badiofaux
- Species: B. mogotensis

Binomial name
- Badiofaux mogotensis C. de la Torre & Bartsch, 1972

= Badiofaux mogotensis =

Species of gastropods

Badiofaux mogotensis is a species of a land snail, terrestrial gastropod mollusk in the family Urocoptidae.
