= Apoma agnesianum =

Scientific classification
- Kingdom: Animalia
- Phylum: Mollusca
- Class: Gastropoda
- Order: Stylommatophora
- Family: Urocoptidae
- Genus: Apoma
- Species: A. agnesianum

Binomial name
- Apoma agnesianum (C. B. Adams, 1849)

Synonyms
- Cylindrella agnesiana C. B. Adams, 1849 (original combination)

Genus of gastropods

Apoma agnesianum is a species of air-breathing land snails, terrestrial pulmonate gastropod molluscs in the subfamily Brachypodellinae of the family Urocoptidae.

== Description ==
(Original description) The shell is sinistral and very elongate, cylindrical in its lower two‑thirds and tapering moderately toward the apex. It is white and bears very oblique, very closely set, fine and rather sharp striae, which become even more oblique in their upper part. Anteriorly the body whorl carries an extremely prominent, sharp carina; on the left side of the body whorl there is a second carina that is scarcely less prominent and acute; on the upper side a third carina is likewise quite sharp and prominent, while the right side of the shell is only subangular. The spire has mostly straight outlines, but its axis is slightly wavy near the tip. The apex is broadly truncate through the loss of about twelve whorls. In typical specimens eighteen to twenty‑two whorls remain, the usual total number being around thirty (one short, complete specimen shows twenty‑eight whorls). The whorls are flattened or only very slightly convex and are separated by a moderately impressed suture. The body whorl is strongly produced obliquely.

The aperture is angled in accordance with the sharpness of the carinae and is trapezoidal in outline, with the upper left side the longest. One diameter of the aperture runs parallel to the axis of the shell, and the other is nearly perpendicular to it. The lip is reflected almost into the plane of the aperture; it is sharp and rather wide.

At common full size the shell is about 36.8 mm long and 4.3 mm wide. Large shells may reach a length of 42.7 mm with a breadth of 4.4 mm, whereas small shells may measure about 27.2 mm in length and 4.1 mm in breadth; a small, complete shell may reach a length of 41.9 mm.

== Distribution ==
This snail occurs on Jamaica.
