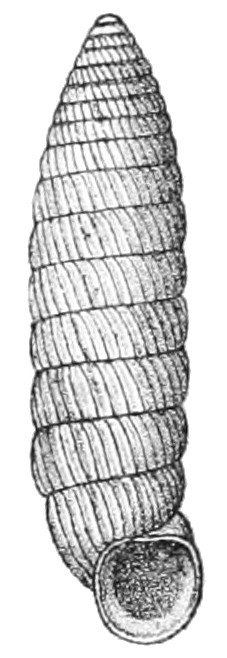
- Drawing of the apertural view of a shell of Holospira bilamellata

Scientific classification
- Domain: Eukaryota
- Kingdom: Animalia
- Phylum: Mollusca
- Class: Gastropoda
- Order: Stylommatophora
- Family: Urocoptidae
- Genus: Holospira
- Species: H. bilamellata

Binomial name
- Holospira bilamellata Dall, 1895

= Holospira bilamellata =

Species of gastropod

Holospira bilamellata, common name bilamellate holospira, is a species of air-breathing land snail, a terrestrial pulmonate gastropod mollusk in the family Urocoptidae.

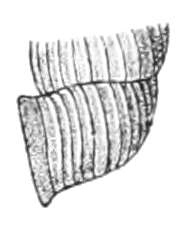
Drawing of lateral view of part of shell of Holospira bilamellata.

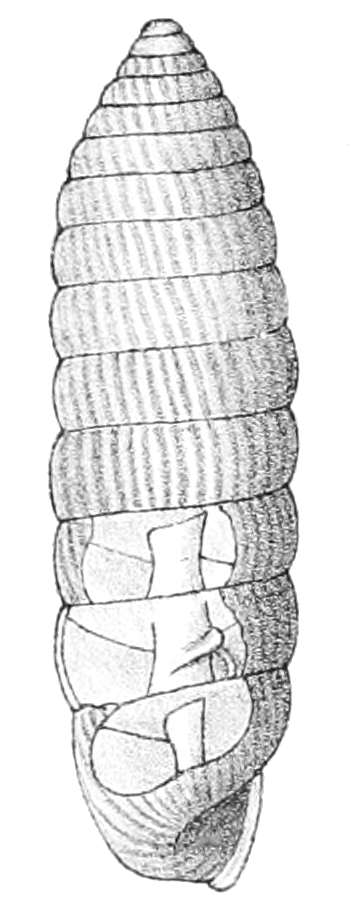
Columella of Holospira bilamellata.
