= Badiofaux mendozana =

Scientific classification
- Kingdom: Animalia
- Phylum: Mollusca
- Class: Gastropoda
- Order: Stylommatophora
- Family: Urocoptidae
- Genus: Badiofaux
- Species: B. mendozana

Binomial name
- Badiofaux mendozana (Pilsbry, 1928)

Synonyms
- Urocoptis mendozana Pilsbry, 1928

Species of gastropods

Badiofaux mendozana is a species of a land snail, terrestrial gastropod mollusk in the family Urocoptidae.

== Description ==
The length of the shell attains 22 mm, its diameter 6 mm.

(Original description) The shell resembles Urocoptis vignalensis (L. Pfeiffer, 1863)(synonym of Nodulia vignalensis (L. Pfeiffer, 1863) in general shape and has the same type of sculpture.

The general color of the shell is light neutral gray, sometimes with a brownish tint, and it is nearly uniform, although it is marked by a few scattered darker streaks. On close inspection, the riblets appear whitish. The rounded aperture is carob brown within, while the expanded lip is white in the upper part and brownish elsewhere. A distinct white columellar fold is present. The internal axis bears a thin, moderately wide, crenulated lower lamella, a much weaker lower lamella above it, and an extremely weak upper spiral.

== Distribution ==
This species occurs in Cuba.
