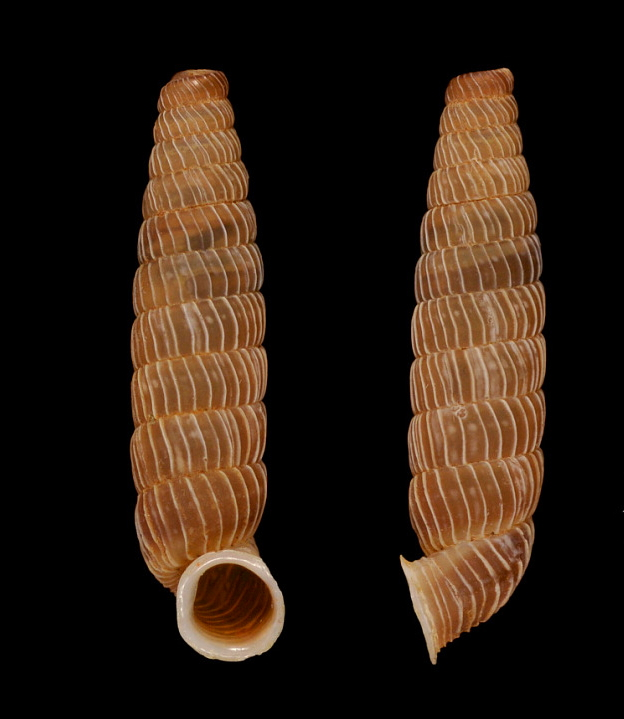
- Shell of Badiofaux elizabethae (syntype at the Smithsonian Institution)

Scientific classification
- Kingdom: Animalia
- Phylum: Mollusca
- Class: Gastropoda
- Order: Stylommatophora
- Family: Urocoptidae
- Genus: Badiofaux
- Species: B. elizabethae

Binomial name
- Badiofaux elizabethae C. de la Torre & Bartsch, 1972

= Badiofaux elizabethae =

Species of gastropods

Badiofaux elizabethae is a species of a land snail, terrestrial gastropod mollusk in the family Urocoptidae.
