= Badiofaux monelasmus =

Scientific classification
- Kingdom: Animalia
- Phylum: Mollusca
- Class: Gastropoda
- Order: Stylommatophora
- Family: Urocoptidae
- Genus: Badiofaux
- Species: B. monelasmus

Binomial name
- Badiofaux monelasmus (Pilsbry, 1928)

Species of gastropods

Badiofaux monelasmus is a species of a land snail, a terrestrial gastropod mollusk in the family Urocoptidae.

== Description ==
The length of the shell attains 18.6 mm, its diameter 5.6 mm.

(Original description) The shell resembles Urocoptis vignalensis (L. Pfeiffer, 1863)(synonym of Nodulia vignalensis (L. Pfeiffer, 1863) in shape. There are 9 whorls remaining.

The ground color of the shell is pecan brown to Van Dyke brown. The sculpture consists of thread-like, arcuate whitish riblets that are much narrower than the intervals and finer and more numerous than in Urocoptis vignalensis. The body whorl lacks a basal keel. The circular aperture is deep brown within and has a well-expanded peristome, which makes very brief contact with the preceding whorl above. The internal axis bears a single strong, smooth spiral lamella that revolves near the base.

== Distribution ==
This species occurs in Cuba.
