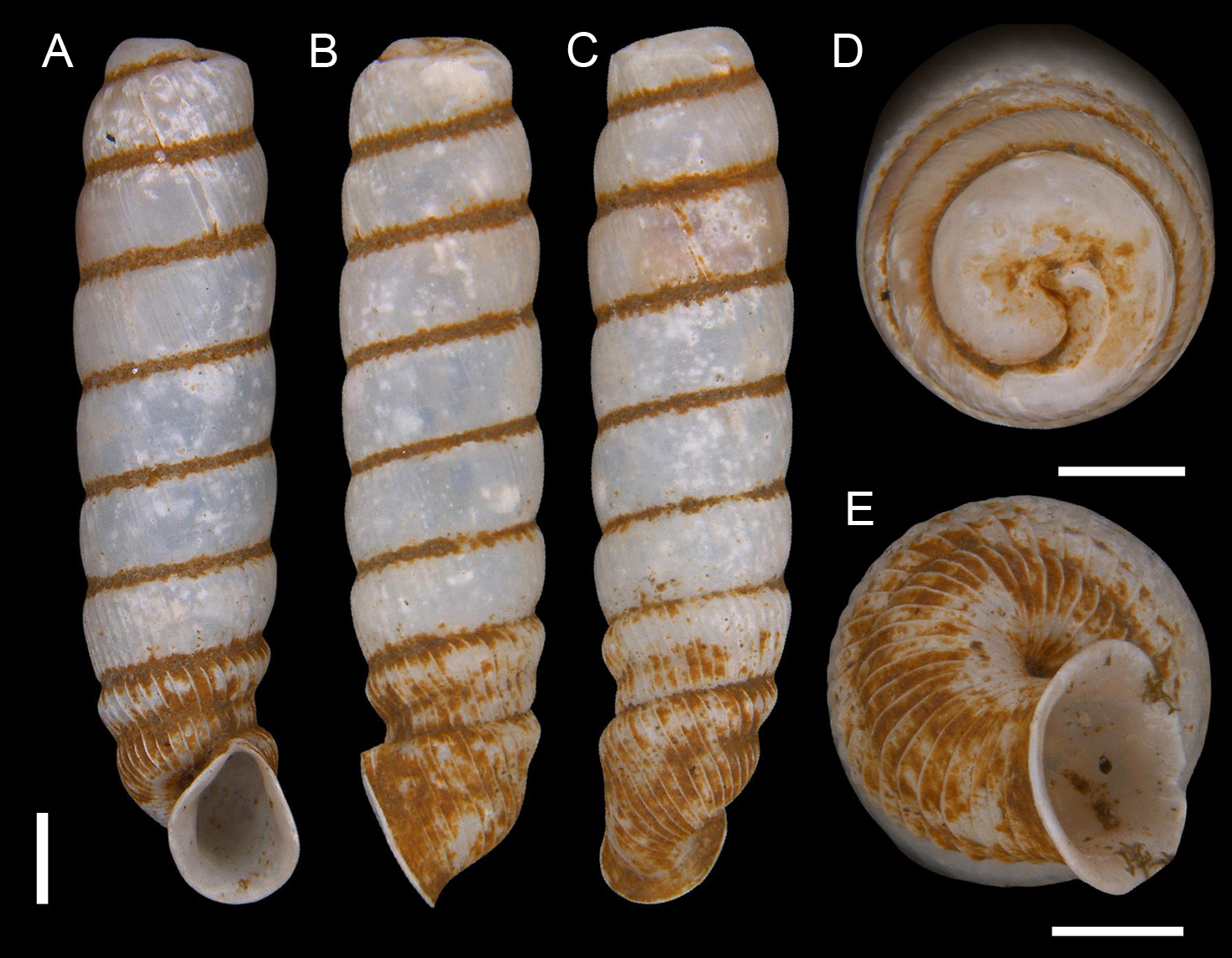
- Different views of the shell of the holotype of Caerbannogia calida: A- apertural view; B- left lateral view; C- dorsal view; D- apical view; E- umbilical view; (scale bars = 1 mm)

Scientific classification
- Kingdom: Animalia
- Phylum: Mollusca
- Class: Gastropoda
- Order: Stylommatophora
- Family: Eucalodiidae
- Genus: Caerbannogia; Salvador, Ferreira-Santos, Cavallari & Bichuette, 2025
- Species: C. calida

Binomial name
- Caerbannogia calida Salvador, Ferreira-Santos, Cavallari & Bichuette, 2025

= Caerbannogia =

Extinct genus of gastropods

Caerbannogia is a genus of small-sized tropical air-breathing land snails, terrestrial pulmonate gastropods in the family Urocoptidae. It is monotypic, containing a single species, Caerbannogia calida, which represents the first record of Eucalodiidae in Brazil. The genus is endemic to the Ressurgência das Areias de Água Quente cave, in the vicinities of the Alto Ribeira Tourist State Park, southeastern Brazil.

Caerbannogia is characterized by a cylindrical-turriform, decollate shell with distinctive narrowing in the body whorl, and the absence of a columellar lamella. Its habitat in a cave environment raises questions about its ecological status as a potential troglophile or troglobite species.

== Taxonomy ==
Caerbannogia was described in 2025 based on a single shell collected in the Ressurgência das Areias de Água Quente cave in the Upper Ribeira Valley, Brazil. Its distinctive shell morphology, particularly the absence of a columellar lamella and the narrowing of the body whorl, places it within the family Eucalodiidae, a group previously thought to be restricted to the Caribbean, Mexico, and Central America. The genus name is a humorous reference to the Cave of Caerbannog from Monty Python and the Holy Grail, and it is grammatically feminine. The specific epithet of C. calida comes from Latin calidus, meaning warm, referring to the type locality in Ressurgência das Areias de Água Quente Cave (Resurgence of the Warm Water Sands, in Portuguese).

== Description ==
The shell of Caerbannogia calida is small (7.86 mm in height and 1.89 mm in width), cylindrical-turriform, and decollate, meaning the apex is broken off naturally as part of its growth. The shell has 8 whorls, is dextral (right-coiling), thin, and pale beige to white. It features prosocline (forward-leaning) axial ribs that become stronger and more widely spaced towards the aperture. Each whorl has a subtle shoulder-like angulation near the suture. The most distinctive feature is the pronounced narrowing in the middle of the body whorl and the preceding whorl. The aperture is subcircular and somewhat elongated upwards. The internal columella is hollow and lacks the lamella characteristic of some related taxa. Since C. calida was described based on a single empty shell, the soft parts of this species are still unknown.

== Distribution and habitat ==
This species is known exclusively from its type locality, the Ressurgência das Areias de Água Quente cave in Iporanga, São Paulo, Brazil. The cave is part of the Areias cave system, adjacent to but outside the boundaries of the Alto Ribeira Tourist State Park. This cave is situated in the southwestern portion of the Lajeado-Bombas karst area, on the right bank of the Betari River. The Areias system includes other caves such as Areias de Cima and Areias de Baixo and is recognized for its rich subterranean biodiversity. It also harbours other gastropod species, like the troglobitic Potamolithus troglobius.

The holotype of C. calida was found in silt and rocky substrate near the riverbank inside the cave. Although the specimen could potentially have been transported post-mortem, the fragile nature of the shell makes this unlikely. There is no definitive evidence yet to determine whether C. calida is an obligate cave-dweller or a facultative one (troglophilic), but its absence from surface surveys in one of the most thoroughly sampled regions of Brazil suggests it is at least troglophilic.

== Conservation ==
The Ressurgência das Areias de Água Quente cave is not under formal protection like other caves within PETAR. This lack of protection has led to visible anthropogenic impacts, including deforestation around the cave entrance and unregulated tourist access, which pose significant threats to the habitat and the fragile cave fauna, including C. calida.
