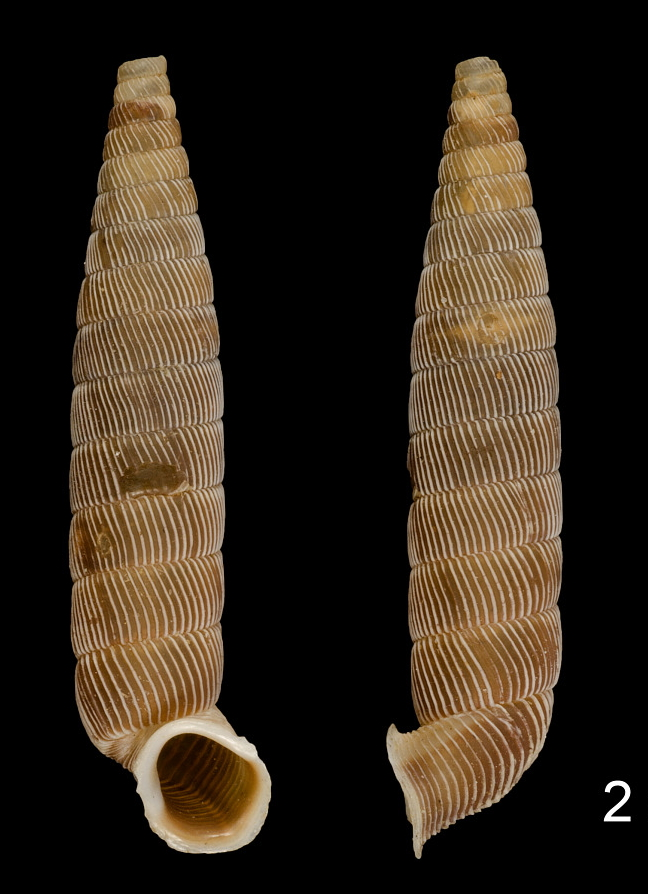
- Shell of Badiofaux cavernicola (syntype at the Smithsonian Institution)

Scientific classification
- Kingdom: Animalia
- Phylum: Mollusca
- Class: Gastropoda
- Order: Stylommatophora
- Family: Urocoptidae
- Genus: Badiofaux
- Species: B. cavernicola

Binomial name
- Badiofaux cavernicola C. de la Torre & Bartsch, 1972

= Badiofaux cavernicola =

Species of gastropods

Badiofaux cavernicola is a species of a land snail, terrestrial gastropod mollusk in the family Urocoptidae.
