= Holospiridae =

Scientific classification
- Kingdom: Animalia
- Phylum: Mollusca
- Class: Gastropoda
- Order: Stylommatophora
- Suborder: Helicina
- Infraorder: Helicina
- Superfamily: Urocoptoidea
- Family: Holospiridae; Pilsbry, 1946

Family of molluscs

Holospiridae is a family of gastropods belonging to the superfamily Urocoptoidea of the order Stylommatophora.

== Genera ==
- Coelostemma Dall, 1895
- Haplocion Pilsbry, 1902
- Hendersoniella Dall, 1905
- Holospira von Martens, 1860
- Metastoma Strebel & Pfeffer, 1879

=== Genera brought into synonymy ===
- Acera Albers, 1850: synonym of Holospira E. von Martens, 1860
- Bostrichocentrum Strebel & Pfeffer, 1879: synonym of Holospira (Bostrichocentrum) Strebel, 1879 represented as Holospira E. von Martens, 1860 (superseded rank)

- Distomospira Dall, 1895: synonym of Holospira E. von Martens, 1860
- Eudistemma Dall, 1895: synonym of Holospira E. von Martens, 1860
- Haplostemma Dall, 1895: synonym of Holospira E. von Martens, 1860
- Hendersonia Dall, 1905: synonym of Hendersoniella Dall, 1905
- Liostemma Bartsch, 1906: synonym of Haplocion Pilsbry, 1902
- Malinchea Bartsch, 1945: synonym of Holospira E. von Martens, 1860
- Megaxis Pilsbry, 1946: synonym of Coelostemma Dall, 1895
- Millerella Gilbertson & Naranjo-Garcia, 1998: synonym of Holospira (Millerspira) Gilbertson & Narnajo-Garcia, 2004 represented as Holospira E. von Martens, 1860
- Tristemma Bartsch, 1906: synonym of Holospira E. von Martens, 1860 (junior homonym of Tristemma Brandt, 1835)
