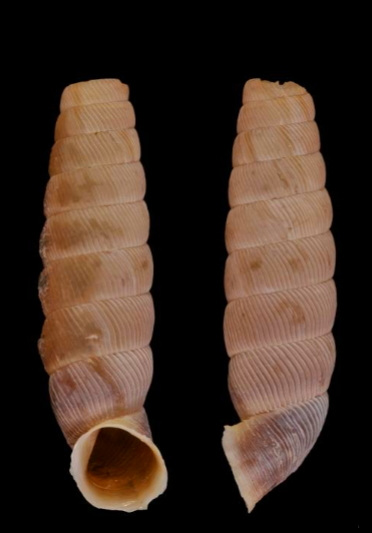
- Shell of Badiofaux asinorum

Scientific classification
- Kingdom: Animalia
- Phylum: Mollusca
- Class: Gastropoda
- Order: Stylommatophora
- Superfamily: Urocoptoidea
- Family: Urocoptidae
- Subfamily: Urocoptinae
- Genus: Badiofaux; Pilsbry, 1941

Type species
- Cylindrella trilamellata L. Pfeiffer, 1864

Synonyms
- Urocoptis (Badiofaux) Pilsbry, 1941 superseded rank

= Badiofaux =

Genus of gastropods

Badiofaux is a genus of gastropods belonging to the subfamily Urocoptinae of the family Urocoptidae.

== Species ==
- Badiofaux asinorum C. de la Torre & Bartsch, 1972
- Badiofaux cavernicola C. de la Torre & Bartsch, 1972
- Badiofaux elizabethae C. de la Torre & Bartsch, 1972
- Badiofaux gutierrezi (Arango, 1876)
- Badiofaux mendozana (Pilsbry, 1928)
- Badiofaux mogotensis C. de la Torre & Bartsch, 1972
- Badiofaux monelasmus (Pilsbry, 1928)
- Badiofaux plumbea (L. Pfeiffer, 1864)
- Badiofaux trilamellata (L. Pfeiffer, 1864)
