= Badiofaux gutierrezi =

Scientific classification
- Kingdom: Animalia
- Phylum: Mollusca
- Class: Gastropoda
- Order: Stylommatophora
- Family: Urocoptidae
- Genus: Badiofaux
- Species: B. gutierrezi

Binomial name
- Badiofaux gutierrezi (Arango, 1876)

Synonyms
- Cylindrella gutierrezi Arango, 1876 superseded combination; Urocoptis (Gongylostoma) gutierrezi (Arango, 1876) (superseded generic combination)

Species of gastropods

Badiofaux gutierrezi is a species of a land snail, terrestrial gastropod mollusk in the family Urocoptidae.

== Description ==
(Original description in Latin) This species is very similar to Cylindrella artemisiae L. Pfeiffer, 1863, now accepted as Gongylostoma artemisiae, but it is more cylindrical in form and has an internal columella with two lamellae, as in Gongylostoma artemisiae, though the lamellae are compressed and weak, whereas they are strong in G. artemisiae.

== Distribution ==
This species occurs in Cuba.
