= Holospira mesolia =

Conservation status
- Critically Imperiled (NatureServe)

Scientific classification
- Kingdom: Animalia
- Phylum: Mollusca
- Class: Gastropoda
- Order: Stylommatophora
- Family: Urocoptidae
- Genus: Holospira
- Species: H. mesolia

Binomial name
- Holospira mesolia Pilsbry, 1912

Species of gastropod

Holospira mesolia, common name widemouth holospira, is a species of air-breathing land snail, a terrestrial pulmonate gastropod mollusk in the family Urocoptidae.

== Original description ==
Holospira mesolia was originally described by Henry Augustus Pilsbry in 1912. The type locality is Sanderson, Terrell County, Texas, USA.

Pilsbry's original text (the type description) reads as follows:

HOLOSPIRA MESOLIA, n. sp.

The shell is cylindric-fusiform, of a delicate pink-white tint, the upper part white with blue stains; dead shells white throughout. Whorls 14, the first 2½ smooth, forming the mamillar embryonic shell, the first whorl rapidly increasing, second swollen, next half whorl very narrow. Subsequent whorls are nearly fiat, rather finely but strongly striate, regularly increasing to the 8th or 9th whorl, where the shell reaches its greatest diameter. After that the whorls are nearly smooth, rather glossy, and the shell diminishes slowly in diameter to the base. The last two whorls have retractive axial ribs which gradually increase in strength, and are strongest on the straight part of the last whorl and base. The last whorl is somewhat, compressed laterally and projects, carrying the aperture well forward. Aperture is very shortly ovate, almost circular, light brown within. Peristome very broad, flatly reflexed, white. The internal axis is smooth throughout, rather slender, tapering downwards, with a diameter of about 1 mm. in the widest part.

Length 23.5, greatest diam. 6 mm.; whorls 14.

Length 22.6, greatest diam. 6.3 mm.; whorls 13½.

Length 20, greatest diam. 5.8 mm.; whorls 12¾.

Sanderson, Terrell Co., Texas, on a low limestone ledge along the railroad. Elevation 2800-2900 ft. Types no. 107001 A. N. S. P., collected August 25, 1912 by Messrs. Morgan Hebard and J. A. G. Rehn.

This handsome Holospira is most closely related to H. semisculpta Stearns, which was described from a canyon above San Carlos, Chihuahua, a place on the Mexican side of the Great Bend of the Rio Grande. Dr. Dall and Dr. Bartsch have kindly compared specimens with the type of semisculpta, and report that the new species "differs in the profile, which in your shell is more contracted toward the base, rendering it spindle-shaped, while the former is more cylindrical. The ribs in yours do not extend over so many of the basal whorls, and the expanded peristome gives it a very distinct appearance. It is doubtless a distinct species."

With the Holospira were found specimens of Polygyra texasiana texasensis and a Succinea.

== Distribution ==
This species occurs in Texas, USA.
