= Anoma =

Scientific classification
- Kingdom: Animalia
- Phylum: Mollusca
- Class: Gastropoda
- Order: Stylommatophora
- Family: Urocoptidae
- Genus: Anoma; Albers, 1850

Genus of land snails

Anoma is a genus of gastropods belonging to the family Urocoptidae.

The species of this genus are found in America.

== Species ==
Species:

- Anoma adamsi Pilsbry, 1903
- Anoma alboanfractus (Chitty, 1853)
- Anoma dohrniana (Pfeiffer, 1871)
- Anoma flexuosa (L. Pfeiffer, 1866)
- Anoma fuscolabris (Chitty, 1853)
- Anoma gossei (L. Pfeiffer, 1846)
- Anoma gracilis (C. B. Adams, 1851)
- Anoma integra (C. B. Adams, 1851)
- Anoma jarvisi Pilsbry, 1903
- Anoma levis (C. B. Adams, 1851)
- Anoma nigrescens (C. B. Adams, 1851)
- Anoma nitens (Chitty, 1853)
- Anoma prunicolor (Chitty, 1853)
- Anoma pulchella (Chitty, 1853)
- Anoma pulla (Chitty, 1853)
- Anoma radiata (Chitty, 1853)
- Anoma sinuata (C. B. Adams, 1851)
- Anoma solida (C. B. Adams, 1851)
- Anoma splendens (L. Pfeiffer, 1841)
- Anoma striata (C. B. Adams, 1851)
- Anoma tesselata (C. B. Adams, 1851)
- Anoma tricolor (L. Pfeiffer, 1847)
- Anoma virginea (Weinland & E. von Martens, 1859)
