= Brachypodella =

Scientific classification
- Kingdom: Animalia
- Phylum: Mollusca
- Class: Gastropoda
- Order: Stylommatophora
- Family: Urocoptidae
- Subfamily: Brachypodellinae
- Genus: Brachypodella; Beck, 1837

Type species
- Brachypodella collaris (Férussac, 1821)

Synonyms
- Brachypodella (Brachypodella) H. Beck, 1837; Brachypodella (Siphonolaemus) Pilsbry, 1903 junior subjective synonym; Brachypus Guilding, 1828 (junior homonym (of Brachypus Swainson, 1828 (Aves) ); Cylindrella L. Pfeiffer, 1840 superseded combination; Pupa (Brachypodella) H. Beck, 1837 superseded rank; Pupa (Siphonostoma) Swainson, 1840; Siphonostoma Swainson, 1840; Tetrentodon (Siphonolaemus) Pilsbry, 1903 (junior synonym)

Genus of gastropods

Brachypodella is a genus of gastropods belonging to the subfamily Brachypodellinae of the family Urocoptidae.

== General characteristics ==
(Described as Brachypus) The animal is heliciform, with a snail‑like body. It bears four tentacles, the larger pair carrying the eyes. The mouth lies beneath, and the foot is very short, so that the animal has great difficulty in dragging the elongate shell.

The shell is fusiform and slender, composed of many whorls, all of them narrow. The body whorl is constricted and slightly keeled. The aperture is small, simple, and almost round, without teeth. The lip is thickened and reflexed, its margins united all around. There is no operculum.

== Distribution ==
The species of this genus are found in Northern and Central America.

== Species ==
- Brachypodella angulifera (L. Pfeiffer, 1858)
- Brachypodella antiperversa (Férussac, 1832): synonym of Brachypodella collaris (A. Férussac, 1821) (junior subjective synonym)
- Brachypodella bourguignatiana (Ancey, 1886)
- †Brachypodella britoi Ferreira & Coelho, 1971
- Brachypodella caymanensis Pilsbry, 1930
- Brachypodella chordata (L. Pfeiffer, 1855)
- Brachypodella collaris (A. Férussac, 1821)
- Brachypodella costata (Guilding, 1828)
- Brachypodella darlingtoni Clench, 1935
- Brachypodella dominicensis (L. Pfeiffer, 1850)
- Brachypodella dubia (Pilsbry, 1891)
- Brachypodella gibbonsi H. B. Baker, 1924
- Brachypodella hanleyana (L. Pfeiffer, 1847)
- Brachypodella insulaecygni W. F. Clapp, 1914
- Brachypodella kugleri Forcart, 1948
- Brachypodella leucopleura (Menke, 1847)
- Brachypodella levisi D. S. Dourson, Caldwell & J. A. Dourson, 2018
- Brachypodella minuta (L. Pfeiffer, 1859)
- Brachypodella morini (Morelet, 1849)
- Brachypodella nidicostata Spence, 1920
- Brachypodella pallida (L. Pfeiffer, 1845)
- Brachypodella portoricensis (L. Pfeiffer, 1852)
- Brachypodella raveni (Crosse, 1872)
- Brachypodella riisei (L. Pfeiffer, 1852)
- Brachypodella smithiana (L. Pfeiffer, 1866)
- Brachypodella speluncae (L. Pfeiffer, 1852)
- Brachypodella subtilis (Morelet, 1849)
- Brachypodella tatei (Crosse, 1872)
- Brachypodella trinitaria (L. Pfeiffer, 1861)
- Brachypodella venezuelensis Forcart, 1948
