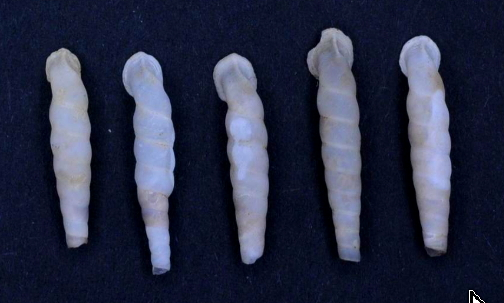
- Shell of Apoma chemnitzianum

Scientific classification
- Kingdom: Animalia
- Phylum: Mollusca
- Class: Gastropoda
- Order: Stylommatophora
- Family: Urocoptidae
- Genus: Apoma; Beck, 1837

Type species
- Apoma elongata H. Beck, 1837

Species
- See text

Synonyms
- Casta Albers, 1850; Clausilia (Apoma) H. Beck, 1837 superseded rank

= Apoma =

Genus of gastropods

Apoma is a genus of air-breathing land snails, terrestrial pulmonate gastropod molluscs in the subfamily Brachypodellinae of the family Urocoptidae.

Snails of this genus are the most critically endangered and some are probably already extinct.

== Species ==
- Apoma agnesianum (C. B. Adams, 1849)
- Apoma chemnitzianum (A. Férussac, 1821)
- Apoma diminutum (C. B. Adams, 1851)
- Apoma gracile (W. Wood, 1828)

Synonyms

- Apoma elongata H. Beck, 1837: synonym of Apoma chemnitzianum (A. Férussac, 1821) (junior synonym)
