= Metastoma roemeri =

Conservation status
- Apparently Secure (NatureServe)

Scientific classification
- Kingdom: Animalia
- Phylum: Mollusca
- Class: Gastropoda
- Order: Stylommatophora
- Family: Holospiridae
- Genus: Metastoma; Strebel, 1880
- Species: M. roemeri

Binomial name
- Metastoma roemeri Pfeiffer, 1848

Synonyms
- Cylindrella roemeri L. Pfeiffer, 1848; Holospira roemeri brevissima Pilsbry, 1950; Holospira roemeri var. minor Sterki, 1892 (nomen nudum); Holospira roemeri var. minor Cockerell, 1898

Species of mollusc

Metastoma is a monotypic genus of land snail in the family Holospiridae.

Metastoma roemeri, the single species of the genus, can be found in arid habitats in the United States (New Mexico and Texas) and Mexico (Coahuila and Chihuahua).
