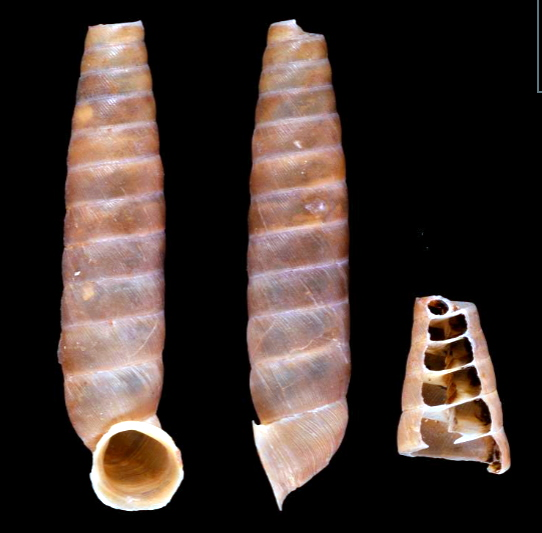
- Shell of Pycnoptychia humboldtii johnsoni (syntype at the Smithsonian Institution)

Scientific classification
- Kingdom: Animalia
- Phylum: Mollusca
- Class: Gastropoda
- Order: Stylommatophora
- Family: Urocoptidae
- Genus: Pycnoptychia; Pilsbry & Vanatta, 1898

= Pycnoptychia =

Genus of gastropods

Pycnoptychia is a genus of a land snails, terrestrial gastropod mollusks in the family Urocoptidae.

== Distribution ==
This genus lives in Cuba.

== Ecology ==
Species in the genus Pycnoptychia are a ground dwelling species in Cuba.

== Species ==
Species in the genus Pycnoptychia include:

- Pycnoptychia amicorum Torre & Bartsch, 2008
- Pycnoptychia humboldtii (Pfeiffer, 1840)
- Pycnoptychia oviedoiana (d’Orbigny, 1842)
- Pycnoptychia peraffinis (Pilsbry, 1903)
- Pycnoptychia scaeva (Gundlach in Pfeiffer, 1863)
- Pycnoptychia shuttleworthiana (Poey, 1856)
- Pycnoptychia strangulata (Poey, 1856)
- Pycnoptychia striatella (Wright in Pfeiffer, 1864)
- Pycnoptychia torrei (Arango, 1876)
- Pycnoptychia trina Torre & Bartsch, 2008
