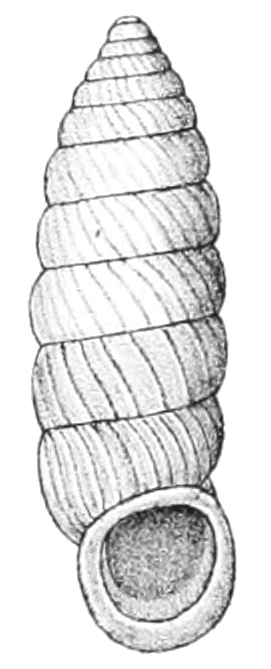
- Drawing of apertural view of the Haplocion pasonis.

Conservation status
- Critically Imperiled (NatureServe)

Scientific classification
- Kingdom: Animalia
- Phylum: Mollusca
- Class: Gastropoda
- Order: Stylommatophora
- Family: Holospiridae
- Genus: Haplocion
- Species: H. pasonis

Binomial name
- Haplocion pasonis (Dall, 1895)

Synonyms
- Holospira pasonis Dall, 1895

= Haplocion pasonis =

Species of gastropod

Haplocion pasonis, commonly known as the robust holospira, is a species of air-breathing land snail in the family Holospiridae.

This species is found in Texas, USA.
