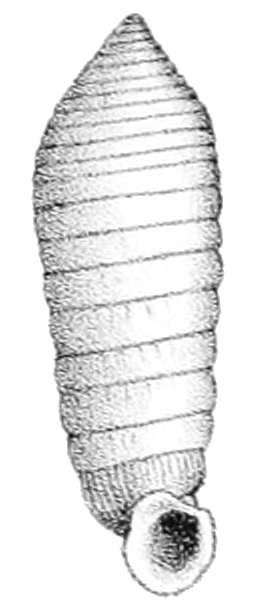
- Illustration of a shell of Holospira elizabethae, in the family Urocoptidae

Scientific classification
- Kingdom: Animalia
- Phylum: Mollusca
- Class: Gastropoda
- Subcohort: Panpulmonata
- Superorder: Eupulmonata
- Order: Stylommatophora
- Suborder: Helicina
- Infraorder: Helicina
- Superfamily: Urocoptoidea

Families
- Urocoptidae; Cerionidae; Epirobiidae

= Urocoptoidea =

Superfamily of gastropods

Urocoptoidea is a superfamily of land snails, gastropods in the suborder Helicina.

== Families ==
In 2005, according to the taxonomy of the Gastropoda by Bouchet & Rocroi, the families Urocoptidae and Cerionidae were classified within the superfamily Orthalicoidea.

In 2008, the superfamily Urocoptoidea was established by the malacologist Uit de Weerd, based on molecular phylogeny research.

In 2012, Thompson established a new family, the Epirobiidae.

== Families ==
- Cerionidae Pilsbry, 1901
- Epirobiidae Thompson, 2012
- Eucalodiidae P. Fischer & Crosse, 1873
- Holospiridae Pilsbry, 1946
- Urocoptidae Pilsbry, 1898 (1868)
