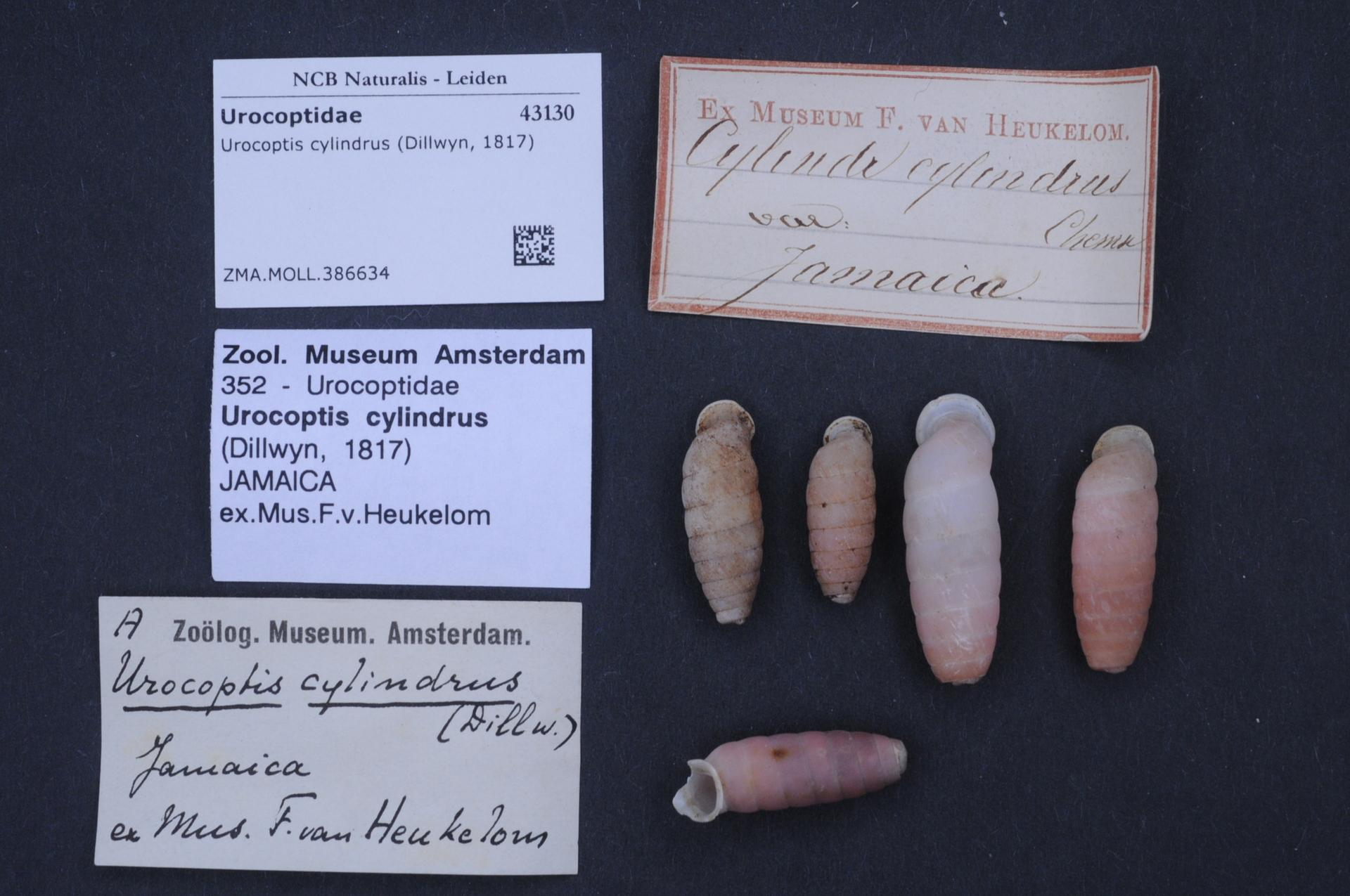
- Shell of Urocoptis cylindrus (specimen at Naturalis Biodiversity Center)

Scientific classification
- Kingdom: Animalia
- Phylum: Mollusca
- Class: Gastropoda
- Order: Stylommatophora
- Family: Urocoptidae
- Genus: Urocoptis; Beck, 1837

Species
- See text

Synonyms
- Cylindrella (Thaumasia) Albers, 1850 junior homonym (Invalid: not Perty, 1833...); Cylindrella (Urocoptis) H. Beck, 1837 superseded rank; Pupa (Urocoptis) H. Beck, 1837 superseded rank; Urocoptis (Spirocoptis) Pilsbry, 1902 alternative representation; Urocoptis (Urocoptis) H. Beck, 1837 alternative representation

= Urocoptis =

Genus of gastropods

Urocoptis is a genus of air-breathing land snails, terrestrial pulmonate gastropod molluscs in the family Urocoptidae.

Urocoptis is the type genus of the family Urocoptidae.

== Species ==
- Urocoptis ambigua (C. B. Adams, 1849)
- † Urocoptis amethystina (Chitty, 1855)
- Urocoptis antiquus Pilsbry & Olsson, 1954
- Urocoptis aspersa (C. B. Adams, 1849)
- Urocoptis baquieana (Chitty, 1855)
- Urocoptis brevis (L. Pfeiffer, 1841)
- Urocoptis cylindrus (Dillwyn, 1817)
- † Urocoptis dubia (Chitty, 1853)
- † Urocoptis floridana (Dall, 1890)
- Urocoptis gravesii (C. B. Adams, 1849)
- Urocoptis hendersoni Pilsbry, 1902
- Urocoptis instabilis (Vendryes, 1901)
- Urocoptis megacheila (Chitty, 1855)
- Urocoptis nobilior (C. B. Adams, 1845)
- Urocoptis ovata (Deshayes, 1851)
- Urocoptis procera (C. B. Adams, 1850)
- Urocoptis producta (C. B. Adams, 1851)
- Urocoptis sanguinea (L. Pfeiffer, 1845)
- Urocoptis transparens (L. Pfeiffer, 1866)
- Urocoptis zonata (C. B. Adams, 1851)
