= Epirobiidae =

Scientific classification
- Kingdom: Animalia
- Phylum: Mollusca
- Class: Gastropoda
- Order: Stylommatophora
- Superfamily: Urocoptoidea
- Family: Epirobiidae; Thompson, 2012

Diversity
- 22 species

Family of gastropods

Epirobiidae is a family of air-breathing land snails, terrestrial gastropod mollusks in the superfamily Urocoptoidea.

== Taxonomy ==
The American malacologist Fred G. Thompson established the family Epirobiidae in 2012 for five genera of snails (Epirobia, Propilsbrya, Pectinistemma, Gyrocion, Prionoloplax), which were previously placed within the family Urocoptidae.

== Genera ==
Genera in the family Epirobiidae include:

- Epirobia Strebel & Pfeffer, 1880 - the type genus of the family Epirobiidae, 13 species
- Propilsbrya Bartsch, 1906 - two species
- Pectinistemma Rehder, 1940 - five species
- Gyrocion Pilsbry, 1904 - probable placement within Epirobiidae; the single species is Gyrocion mirabilis (Pilsbry, 1904)
- Prionoloplax Pilsbry, 1953 - probable placement within Epirobiidae; the single species is Prionoloplax odontoplax (Pilsbry, 1953)
