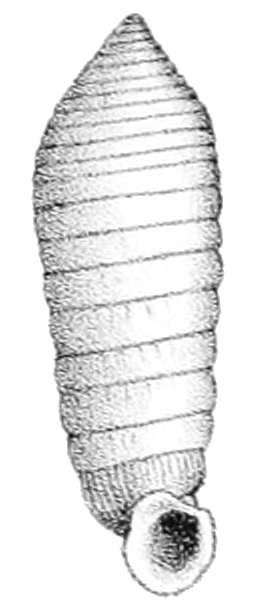
- Shell of Holospira elizabethae

Scientific classification
- Kingdom: Animalia
- Phylum: Mollusca
- Class: Gastropoda
- Order: Stylommatophora
- Family: Urocoptidae
- Genus: Holospira von Martens, 1860

Species
- See text

= Holospira =

Genus of air-breathing land snails

Holospira is a genus of air-breathing land snails, terrestrial pulmonate gastropod molluscs in the family Urocoptidae.

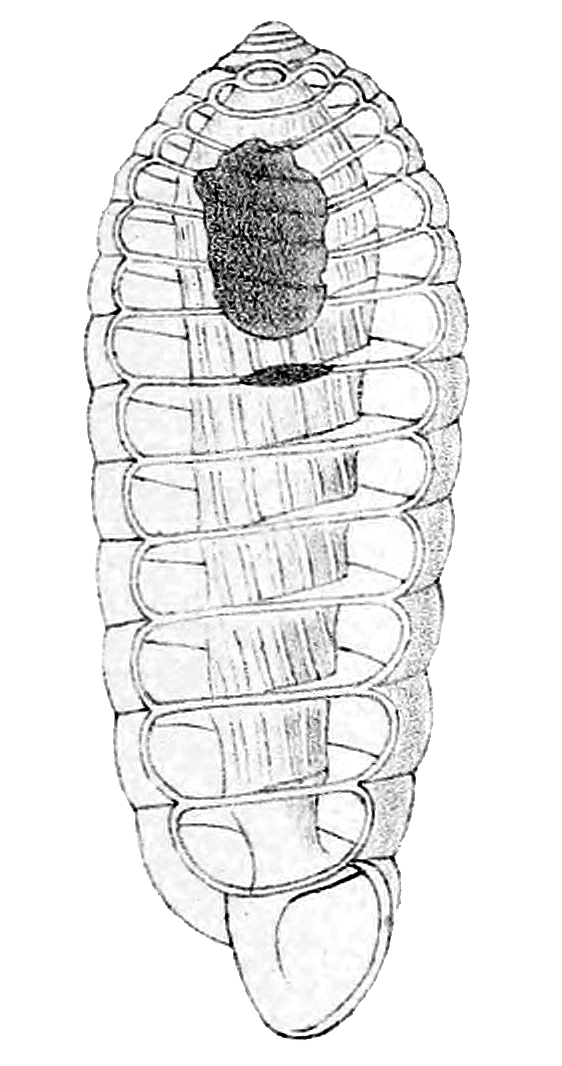
Drawing of the cross section of the shell of Holospira elizabethae showing that the internal columella is hollow, which is typical feature of the genus.

Holospira is the type genus of the subfamily 'Holospirinae Pilsbry, 1946'.

== Etymology ==
Holos (ὅλος) from Ancient Greek means "‘whole’" or "‘entire’" and spira (spīra) from Latin means spire.

== Shell description ==
The shell is small and cylindrical, terminating in a conic spire. The shell has 11-21 whorls, which are closely coiled. The first 1½ of whorls are smooth. The rest of the whorls are smooth, striated or ribbed. The suture is superficial. The body whorl is more or less built forward.

The aperture is small, obliquely pear-shaped, rounded or oval. The peristome is expanded or reflected, continuous and usually free throughout.

The columella (internal column) is hollow, variously sculptured or smooth.

== Anatomy ==
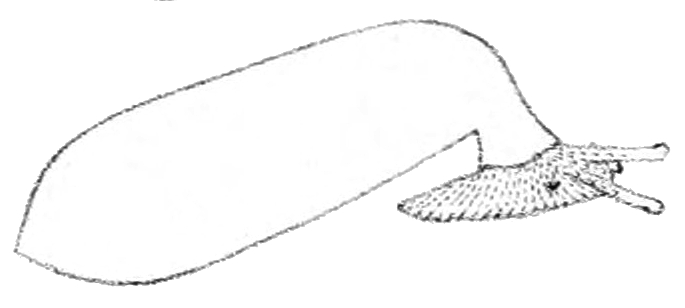
Drawing of Holospira elizabethae.

The foot is small and narrow for its length.

The lung is long and narrow. The Kidney is very narrowly triangular, being wider at the base, tapering anteriorly, slightly longer than the pericardium. There is no secondary ureter.

The buccal mass is small, about twice as long as wide, and the oesophagus opening is well forward. The Salivary glands are not united, and in Holospira goldfussi they have long ducts.

The jaw is thin, arcuate, with a wide median projection below or none at all. The radula is about four times as long as wide, with from 19.1.19 teeth (in Holospira pilsbryi) to 27.1.27 (in Holopsira nelsoni).

For the genital system, there is an atrium of moderate length, the penis is short with a very long vas deferens, the retractor muscle (p. r.) is inserted at or just beyond the slightly swollen penis, and proximally attached to the floor of the lung, as usual.

The free retractor muscles, attached proximally to the axis at about the junction of the cone with the cylindrical portion of the shell, are excessively long.

== Distribution ==
The geographic range of this genus extends from southern Mexico to Texas, Arizona and New Mexico. These snails are not found in Lower California nor Guatemala on the southeast.

== Habitat ==
They are confined chiefly to the elevated plateau, where they live under cacti, etc., in sunny places.

These snails can tolerate great heat.

Henry Augustus Pilsbry (1903) stated that living specimens of Holospira strobeliana and Holospira nelsoni survived immersion in boiling water for some minutes. Unlike other snails, they did not retract in the water.

== Species ==
Species in the genus Holospira include:

- Holospira acanthidia
- Holospira aguerreverei
- Holospira albertoi
- Holospira alvarezensis
- Holospira animasensis Gilbertson & Worthington, 2003 from subgenus Eudistemma
- Holospira arizonensis Stearns, 1890 - Arizona holospira
- Holospira aurantiaca
- Holospira bilamellata Dall, 1895 - bilamellate holospira
- Holospira bostrichocentrum
- Holospira campestris Pilsbry & Ferriss, 1915
- Holospira campo
- Holospira chazumbae
- Holospira chiricahuana Pilsbry, 1905 - Cave Creek holospira
- Holospira cionella Pilsbry, 1905
- Holospira cockerelli Dall, 1897 - Cockerell holospira
- Holospira colymis
- Holospira cremnobates
- Holospira crossei Dall, 1895 - Cross holospira
- Holospira dalli Pilsbry
- Holospira danielsi Pilsbry & Ferriss, 1915 - strongrib holospira
- Holospira denserpens
- Holospira dentaxis
- Holospira durangoensis
- Holospira eburnea
- Holospira elizabethae Pilsbry, 1889
- Holospira fergusoni Gilbertson & Naranjo-García, 2010
- Holospira ferrissi Pilsbry, 1905 - stocky holospira
- Holospira fortisculpta
- Holospira goldfussi (Menke, 1847) - New Braunfels holospira
  - Holospira goldfussi anacachensis Bartsch
- Holospira goldmani
- † Holospira grangeri Cockerell - fossil species from Eocene of New Mexico known only from type locality
- Holospira haasai
- Holospira hamiltoni Dall, 1897 - Hamilton holospira
- Holospira haploplax
- Holospira hinckleyi
- Holospira hinkleyi
- Holospira hoffmani
- Holospira hogeana
- Holospira hyperia
- Holospira insolata
- † Holospira leidyi (Meek) - synonym Pupa leidyi Meek - fossil species from Eocene of New Mexico
- Holospira mariae
- Holospira marmorata
- Holospira maxwelli
- Holospira mesolia Pilsbry, 1912 - widemouth holospira
- Holospira metcalfi F. G. Thompson, 1974 - Metcalf holospira
- Holospira milleri
- Holospira millestriata Pilsbry & Ferriss, 1915
- Holospira millistriata
- Holospira minima
- Holospira montivaga Pilsbry, 1946 - vagabond holospira
- Holospira morelosensis
- Holospira nelsoni
- Holospira odontoplax
- Holospira orcutti
- Holospira oritis Pilsbry & Cheatum, 1951 - mountain holospira
- Holospira palmeri
- Holospira pasonis Dall, 1895 - robust holospira
- Holospira pedroana
- Holospira pfeifferi
- Holospira pilocerei Pfr. - type species
- Holospira pilsbryi
- Holospira pityis Pilsbry & Cheatum, 1951 - pinecone holospira
- Holospira psectra
- Holospira pupa
- Holospira regis Pilsbry & Cockerell, 1905 - royal holospira
- Holospira rehderi
- Holospira remondii
- Holospira rhinion
- Holospira riograndensis Pilsbry, 1946 - Rio Grande holospira
- Holospira saltillensis
- Holospira scololaema
- Holospira sherbrookei Gilbertson, 1989 - Silver Creek holospira
- Holospira stalactella
- Holospira stenopylis
- Holospira stenopyus
- Holospira tantalus Bartsch, 1906 - teasing holospira
- Holospira temeroso
- Holospira teotitlana
- Holospira tryoni
- Holospira whetstonensis Pilsbry & Ferriss, 1923 - Whetstone holospira
- Holospira wilmotti
- Holospira yucatanensis Bartsch, 1906 - Bartsch holospira
- Holospira zygoptyx
