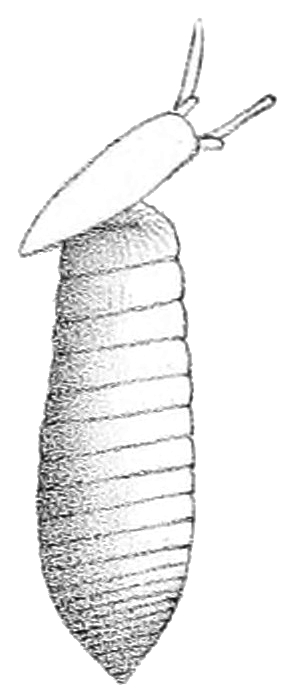
- Drawing of a live individual of Holospira elizabethae from the 1889 original description by Henry Augustus Pilsbry.

Scientific classification
- Kingdom: Animalia
- Phylum: Mollusca
- Class: Gastropoda
- Order: Stylommatophora
- Family: Urocoptidae
- Genus: Holospira
- Species: H. elizabethae

Binomial name
- Holospira elizabethae Pilsbry, 1889

= Holospira elizabethae =

Species of gastropod

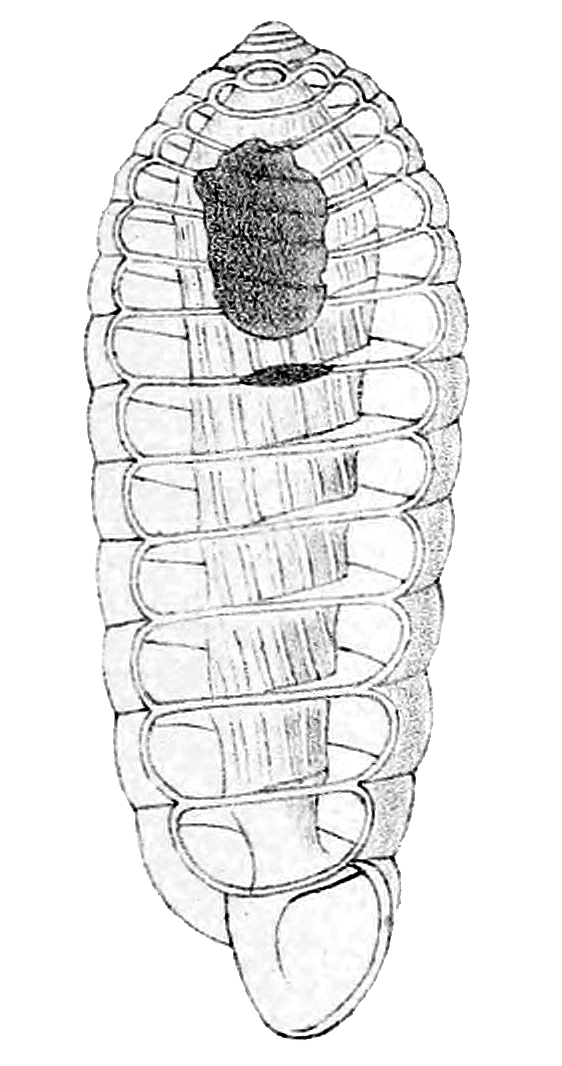
Drawing of a cross section of the shell of Holospira elizabethae, showing that the columella is hollow

Holospira elizabethae is a species of air-breathing land snail, a terrestrial pulmonate gastropod mollusc in the family Urocoptidae.

Paratypes of this species are in the collection of the Natuurhistorisch Museum Rotterdam.

== Original description ==
Holospira elizabethae was originally discovered and described by Henry Augustus Pilsbry in 1889. The type locality is Amula village, which is between the towns of Tixtla and Chilapa de Álvarez, in the State of Guerrero, Mexico.

== Shell description ==
Comparison of apertural view of adult and juvenile shells of Holospira elizabethae:

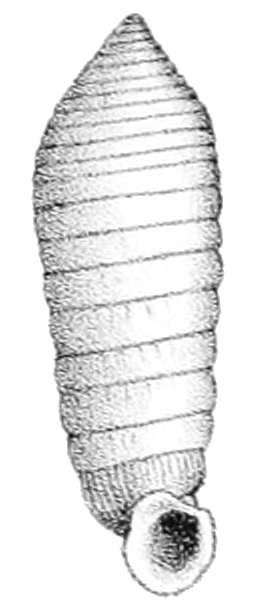
adult shell

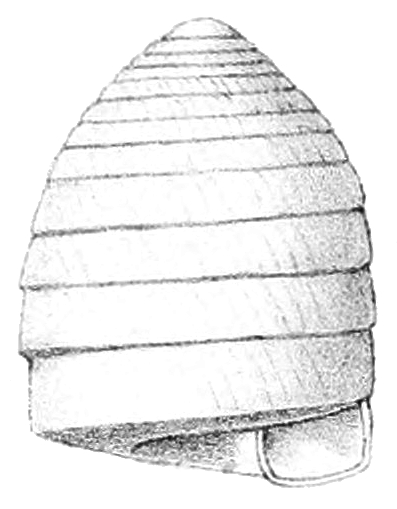
juvenile shell

Comparison of basal (umbilical) views of adult and juvenile shells of Holospira elizabethae:

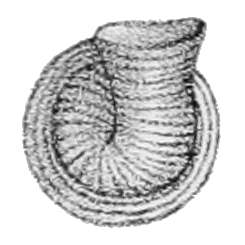
adult shell

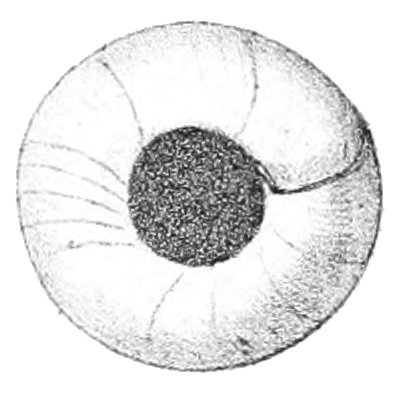
juvenile shell

== Distribution ==
This species occurs in Mexico.
