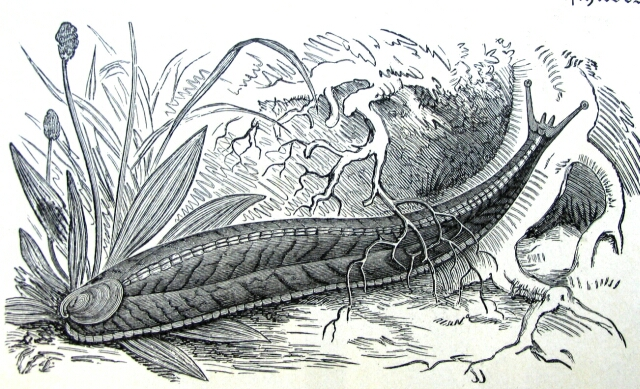
- Drawing of the shelled slug, Testacella haliotidea

Scientific classification
- Kingdom: Animalia
- Phylum: Mollusca
- Class: Gastropoda
- Order: Stylommatophora
- Infraorder: Helicina
- Superfamily: Testacelloidea; Gray, 1840

Families
- See text

= Testacelloidea =

Superfamily of gastropods

The Testacelloidea are a superfamily of air-breathing land snails and slugs, terrestrial gastropod molluscs in the suborder Helicina of the order Stylommatophora.

== Taxonomy ==
The families within the Testacelloidea are as follows:

- Family Testacellidae Gray, 1840

This taxonomy was based on the study by Nordsieck, published in 1986, and the publication by Schileyko in 2000.

The following families, previously categorized within the Testacelloidea, were transferred to the superfamily Oleacinoidea H. Adams & A. Adams, 1855 in 2017.

- Family Oleacinidae H. Adams & A. Adams, 1855
- Family Spiraxidae H. B. Baker, 1939
