= Helicina (infraorder) =

Scientific classification
- Kingdom: Animalia
- Phylum: Mollusca
- Class: Gastropoda
- Superorder: Eupulmonata
- Order: Stylommatophora
- Suborder: Helicina
- Infraorder: Helicina (temporary name)

Superfamilies
- See text

Group of molluscs

The Helicina (temporary name)is an unassigned taxonomic infraorder of air-breathing land snails, semislugs and slugs, terrestrial pulmonate gastropod molluscs in the suborder Helicina.

== Superfamilies ==
- Coelociontoidea Iredale, 1937
- Papillodermatoidea Wiktor, R. Martin & Castillejo, 1990
- Plectopyloidea Möllendorff, 1898
- Punctoidea Morse, 1864
- Testacelloidea Gray, 1840
- Urocoptoidea Pilsbry, 1898 (1868)
