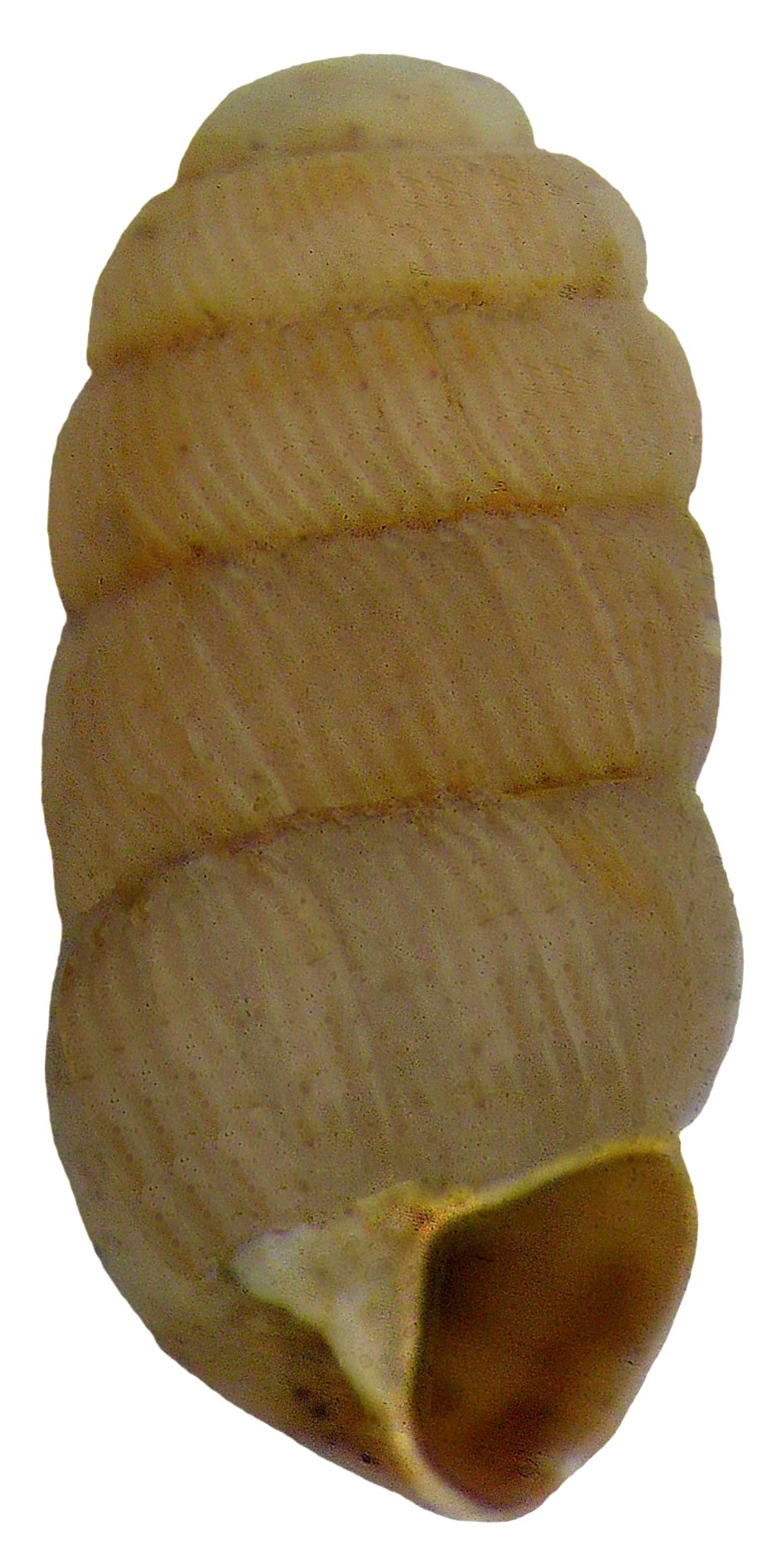
- Truncatellina cylindrica

Scientific classification
- Kingdom: Animalia
- Phylum: Mollusca
- Class: Gastropoda
- Subcohort: Panpulmonata
- Superorder: Eupulmonata
- Order: Stylommatophora
- Suborder: Helicina; Rafinesque, 1815

= Helicina (suborder) =

Suborder of gastropods

Helicina is a suborder of land gastropods which consists of former members of the informal group Sigmurethra which were proven to make a clade. It encompasses the following infraorders along with a collection of families with no superfamily:

- Suborder Helicina ("Non-Achatinoid Clade")
  - Infraorder Arionoidei
  - Infraorder Clausilioidei
  - Infraorder Helicoidei: formed from Helicoidea Rafinesque, 1815 and Sagdoidea Pilsbry, 1895
  - Infraorder Limacoidei: formed from original limacoid clade
  - Infraorder Oleacinoidei
    - Oleacinoidea: formed from original Testacelloidea but with the family Testacellidae excluded;
    - Haplotrematoidea: formed from original Rhytidoidea and Haplotrematidae
  - Infraorder Orthalicoidei
  - Infraorder Pupilloidei (Orthurethra)
  - Infraorder Rhytidoidei: formed by Rhytidoidea merging with contents from Acavoidea.
  - Infraorder Succineoidei (Elasmognatha)
  - Infraorder Helicina (temporary name)
