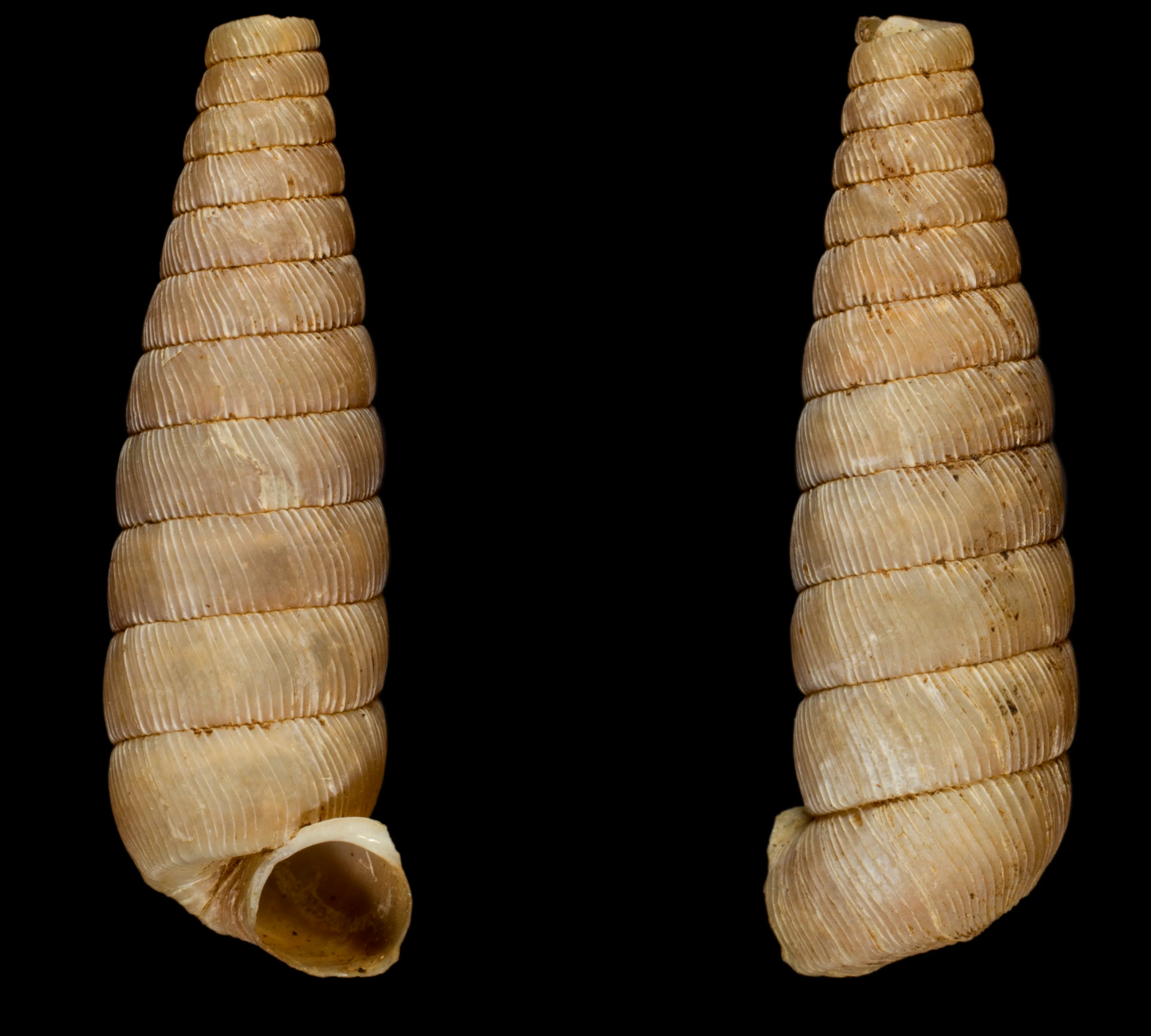
- Shell of Arangia sowerbyana (syntype at MNHN, Paris)

Scientific classification
- Kingdom: Animalia
- Phylum: Mollusca
- Class: Gastropoda
- Order: Stylommatophora
- Superfamily: Urocoptoidea
- Family: Urocoptidae; Pilsbry, 1898 (1868)

= Urocoptidae =

Family of gastropods

Urocoptidae is a family of air-breathing land snails, terrestrial pulmonate gastropod mollusks in the superfamily Urocoptoidea.

== Taxonomy ==
=== 2005 taxonomy ===
The family Urocoptidae was classified in the superfamily Orthalicoidea (according to the taxonomy of the Gastropoda by Bouchet & Rocroi, 2005).

The family Urocoptidae consists of 7 subfamilies (according to the taxonomy of the Gastropoda by Bouchet & Rocroi, 2005):

- Urocoptinae Pilsbry, 1898 (1868) - synonym: Cylindrellidae Tryon, 1868
- Apomatinae Paul, 1982
- Brachypodellinae H. B. Baker, 1956
- Eucalodiinae P. Fischer & Crosse, 1873
- Holospirinae Pilsbry, 1946
- Microceraminae Pilsbry, 1904 - synonyms: Johaniceraminae Jaume & de la Torre, 1972; Macroceraminae Jaume & de la Torre, 1972
- Tetrentodontinae Bartsch, 1943

=== 2008 taxonomy ===
Uit de Weerd (2008) moved the Urocoptidae to the newly established superfamily Urocoptoidea based on molecular phylogeny research.

The following cladogram based on Bayesian analysis of sequences of 28S ribosomal RNA shows the phylogenic relations within the Urocoptoidea. There are up to 2008 genetically analyzed species of Urocoptidae and one species of Cerionidae marked in khaki color in the cladogram.

- Urocoptoidea
  - - - - - - Macroceramus microdon
            - Microceramus pontificus
          - - Torrecoptis holguinensis
            - Autocoptis menkeana
        - - Simplicervix inornata
          - Brachypodella dominicensis gabbi
      - - - - Dissotropis sp. nov.
            - Anisospira lebmanni
          - Archegocoptis crenata
        - Eucalodium sp.
    - Cerionidae
      Cerion striatellum
  - - Coelostemma sp. nov.
    - Hendersoniella lux lux
    - Holospira fortisculpta
  - Epirobia polygyra

=== 2012 taxonomy ===
Fred G. Thompson established the family Epirobiidae in 2012 for five genera of snails (Epirobia, Propilsbrya, Pectinistemma, Gyrocion, Prionoloplax), that were previously placed within Urocoptidae. Data from molecular phylogeny research as well as morphology supports monophyly of Holospiridae Pilsbry, 1946 and the Eucalodiidae Crosse & Fischer, 1868.

== Genera ==
Genera in the family Urocoptidae include:

Brachypodellinae

- Apoma H. Beck, 1837
- Brachypodella Beck, 1837 - type genus of the subfamily Brachypodellinae
- Cyclauchen Pilsbry, 1930
- Geoscala Pilsbry & Vanatta, 1898
- Ischnostrophina Pilsbry, 1933
- Mychostoma Albers, 1850
- Simplicervix Pilsbry, 1903

Urocoptinae

- Acrocoptis C. de la Torre & Bartsch, 1972
- Allocoptis Thompson & Franz, 1976
- Amphicosmia Pilsbry & Vanatta, 1898
- Amphistemma C. de la Torre & Bartsch, 1972
- Anafecoptis C. de la Torre & Bartsch, 1972
- Angulicervix Pilsbry, 1933
- Anoma Albers, 1850
- Arangia Pilsbry & Vanatta, 1898
- Archegocoptis Pilsbry, 1903
- Autocoptis Pilsbry, 1902
- Bactrocoptis Pilsbry, 1902
- Badiofaux Pilsbry, 1941
- Bialasmus C. de la Torre & Bartsch, 1972
- Brachypodella L. Pfeiffer, 1840 (as Cylindrella)
- Bostrichocentrum Strebel, 1879 : synonym of Holospira E. von Martens, 1860
- Brevipedella Pilsbry, 1903
- Callocoptis C. de la Torre & Bartsch, 1972
- Callonia Crosse & P. Fischer, 1870
- Capillacea C. de la Torre & Bartsch, 1972
- Carcinostemma C. de la Torre & Jaume, 1972
- Centralia de la Torre & Bartsch, 1972
- Cochlodinella Pilsbry & Vanatta, 1898
- Esochara Pilsbry & Vanatta, 1898
- Fibricutis Pilsbry, 1903
- Geminicoptis C. de la Torre & Bartsch, 1972
- Gongylostoma Albers, 1850
- Gyraxis Pilsbry, 1903
- Heterocoptis C. de la Torre & Bartsch, 1972
- Idiostemma Pilsbry & Vanatta, 1898
- Insulaceramus Clench, 1967
- Johaniceramus C. de la Torre & Bartsch, 1972
- Levistemma C. de la Torre & Bartsch, 1972
- Liocallonia Pilsbry, 1902
- Liparotes Pilsbry, 1903
- Maceo Pilsbry & Vanatta, 1898
- Macroceramus Guilding, 1828
- Microceramus Pilsbry & Vanatta, 1898 - type genus of the subfamily Microceraminae
- Nesocoptis Pilsbry, 1941
- Nodulia C. de la Torre & Bartsch, 1972
- Organocoptis C. de la Torre & Bartsch, 1972
- Orienticoptis C. de la Torre & Bartsch, 1972
- Paracallonia Pilsbry, 1903
- Pfeiffericoptis C. de la Torre & Bartsch, 1972
- Pineria Poey, 1854
- Planostemma C. de la Torre & Bartsch, 1972
- Pleurostemma C. de la Torre & Bartsch, 1972
- Poecilocoptis Pilsbry, 1941
- Poeycoptis C. de la Torre & Bartsch, 1972
- Pseudopineria Aguayo, 1938
- Pycnoptychia Pilsbry & Vanatta, 1898
- Sagracoptis C. de la Torre & Bartsch, 1972
- Sectilumen Pilsbry & Vanatta, 1898
- Spiroceramus Pilsbry & Vanatta, 1898
- Spirostemma Pilsbry & Vanatta, 1898
- Steatocoptis Pilsbry, 1941
- Strophina Mörch, 1852
- Teneria C. de la Torre & Bartsch, 1972
- Tenuistemma C. de la Torre & Bartsch, 1972
- Tetrentodon Pilsbry, 1903 - type genus of the subfamily Tetrentodontinae
- Tomelasmus Pilsbry & Vanatta, 1898
- Torrecoptis Bartsch, 1943
- Trilamellaxis C. de la Torre & Bartsch, 1972
- Uncinicoptis C. de la Torre & Bartsch, 1972
- Urocoptis Beck, 1837 - type genus of the family Urocoptidae

Urocoptidae incertae sedis (temporary name)

- Habeas Simone, 2013
