= Cerion geophilum =

Scientific classification
- Kingdom: Animalia
- Phylum: Mollusca
- Class: Gastropoda
- Order: Stylommatophora
- Family: Cerionidae
- Genus: Cerion
- Species: C. geophilum

Binomial name
- Cerion geophilum Clench & Aguayo, 1949

Synonyms
- Cerion geophilus Clench & Aguayo, 1949

Species of terrestrial gastropod

Cerion geophilum (occasionally known as Cerion geophilus) is a species of terrestrial gastropod in the family Cerionidae, endemic to Morales Beach, Cuba.

== Ecology and species-relationships ==
Cerion geophilum is part of the distinct semi-square and flat-spired Cerion species clade (or complex) including C. disforme, alberti and torrei all of which are endemic to Holguin Province. This species naturally hybridizes with C. torrei moralesi in the western reaches of Morales Beach. Variation between various Cerion species within small areas of coastline is significant in comparison to that of other terrestrial gastropod groups- along a 50 kilometer stretch of coastline, seven distinct species and many hybrids are present. Several hybrid-swarm populations were interpreted by Ernst Mayr, representing contact zones between various scattered populations of different species and morphotypes.
