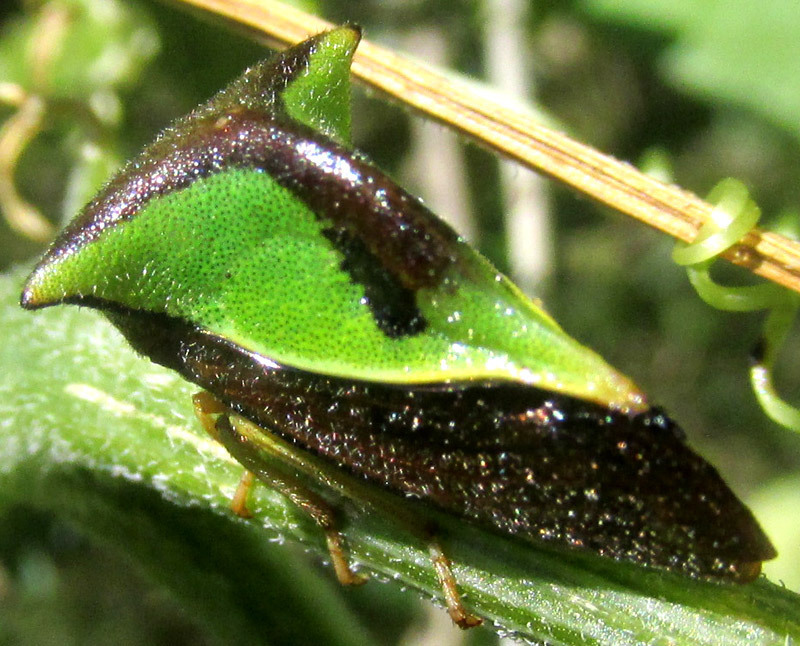

Scientific classification
- Kingdom: Animalia
- Phylum: Arthropoda
- Clade: Pancrustacea
- Class: Insecta
- Order: Hemiptera
- Suborder: Auchenorrhyncha
- Family: Membracidae
- Genus: Hyphinoe
- Species: H. camelus

Binomial name
- Hyphinoe camelus (Gray, 1832)

= Hyphinoe camelus =

Species of insect in the family of treehoppers

Hyphinoe camelus is a species of insect in the family of treehoppers and thornbugs, the Membracidae.

== Description ==
In the genus Hyphinoe, the main feature distinguishing the various species is the appearance of the pronotum. In the first picture below in the gallery, the pronotum is the pointed hump projecting upward above the head, on the right in the picture. Also in the gallery it's to be seen that colors within the species vary considerably, mainly showing hues between green and yellow. All pictures on this page were taken at the same location, so these variations are not specific to their location. Differences in sizes between the sexes in this species are not as marked as in some other Hyphinoe species.

== Range ==
The distribution map showing the locations of observations of Hyphinoe camelus at iNaturalist indicates that the species occurs in Mexico's central highlands from the state of Zacatecas south into Guerrero and east into Veracruz.

== Habitat ==
Little published information is available about habitat preferences of Hyphinoe camelus. The images on this page show individuals on Sechiopsis triquetra and Cucurbita pepo, both members of the squash/gourd family, the Cucurbitaceae, and all observations were made in central Mexico at an elevation of ~1900 meters (~6200 feet).

== Taxonomy ==
The family to which Hyphinoe camelus belongs, the Membracidae, is famous for its morphological diversity. In the genus Hyphinoe, new species have been described based on normal variation in the species' colors.

Genetic studies place the genus Hyphinoe in the subfamily Darninae, though that subfamily as now accepted appears to be polyphyletic.

=== Synonyms ===
For Hyphinoe camelus these synonyms are recognized:

- Hemiptycha cuneata Germar, 1835
- Hemiptycha globiceps Fairmaire, 1846
- Hemiptycha sagata Germar, 1835

== Etymology ==
The genus name Hyphinoe is derived from the Greek individual named Iphinoe or Hyphinoe (Greek: Ἰφινόη) who, in Greek mythology, was a daughter of Antaeus and Tinge. Iphinoe bore a son, Palaemon, fathered by the famous Heracles.

The species name camelus is from the Greek κάμηλος, for "camel," apparently referring to the insect's humped back.

== Gallery ==
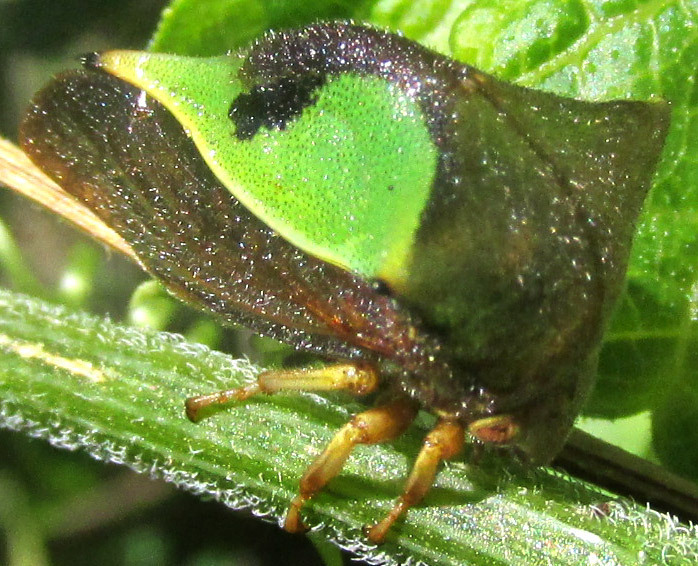
pointed pronotum

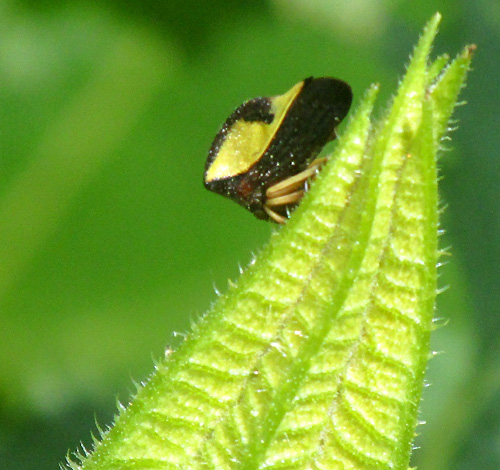
yellow hue

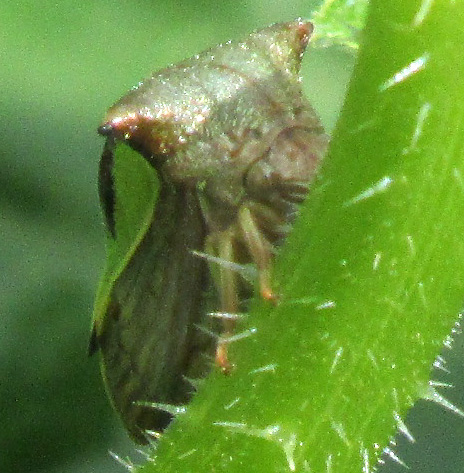
more brown than black
