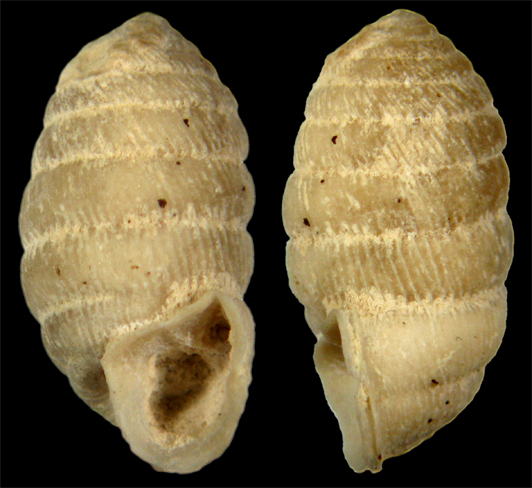
- apertural and lateral view of Brasilennea minor

Scientific classification
- Domain: Eukaryota
- Kingdom: Animalia
- Phylum: Mollusca
- Class: Gastropoda
- Order: Stylommatophora
- Family: Cerionidae
- Genus: †Brasilennea
- Species: †B. minor

Binomial name
- †Brasilennea minor Trindade, 1956

= Brasilennea minor =

Brasilennea minor Temporal range: Paleocene

Extinct species of gastropod

Brasilennea minor is a fossil species of air-breathing land snail, a terrestrial pulmonate gastropod mollusk in the family Cerionidae, from the Paleocene Itaboraí Basin, Brazil. Brasilennea minor is the smallest species in the genus Brasilennea; it was originally described as a smaller variant of Brasilennea arethusae (as reflected by its specific epithet), but was later raised to the rank of species.
