= Cerion saetiae =

Scientific classification
- Kingdom: Animalia
- Phylum: Mollusca
- Class: Gastropoda
- Order: Stylommatophora
- Family: Cerionidae
- Genus: Cerion
- Species: C. saetiae

Binomial name
- Cerion saetiae Sanchez Roig, 1948

Species of gastropod

Cerion saetiae is a species of terrestrial gastropod in the family Cerionidae endemic to coastal areas on Saetia Key, Cuba. The type locality harbours a few specimens, yet new locality records have found more remains despite a concerning decline in live individuals. This species is found in coastal sea-grape and sand-vegetation habitats on Playita de Fidel, Playa del Cristo and Baracutey Beach.
