= Cerion hessei =

Scientific classification
- Kingdom: Animalia
- Phylum: Mollusca
- Class: Gastropoda
- Order: Stylommatophora
- Family: Cerionidae
- Genus: Cerion
- Species: C. hessei

Binomial name
- Cerion hessei Clench & Aguayo, 1949

Species of gastropod

Cerion hessei is a species of terrestrial gastropod in the family Cerionidae endemic to coastal areas near Balcón de Damas in Guardalavaca beach area. Individuals from the type locality showed great variation in size, some individuals being among the smallest recorded in the genus. They are found only among coastal dwarf sea grape trees and in dry foliage in dunes. Some other nearby keys also possess dwarf Cerion species, however the reason is yet unknown.
