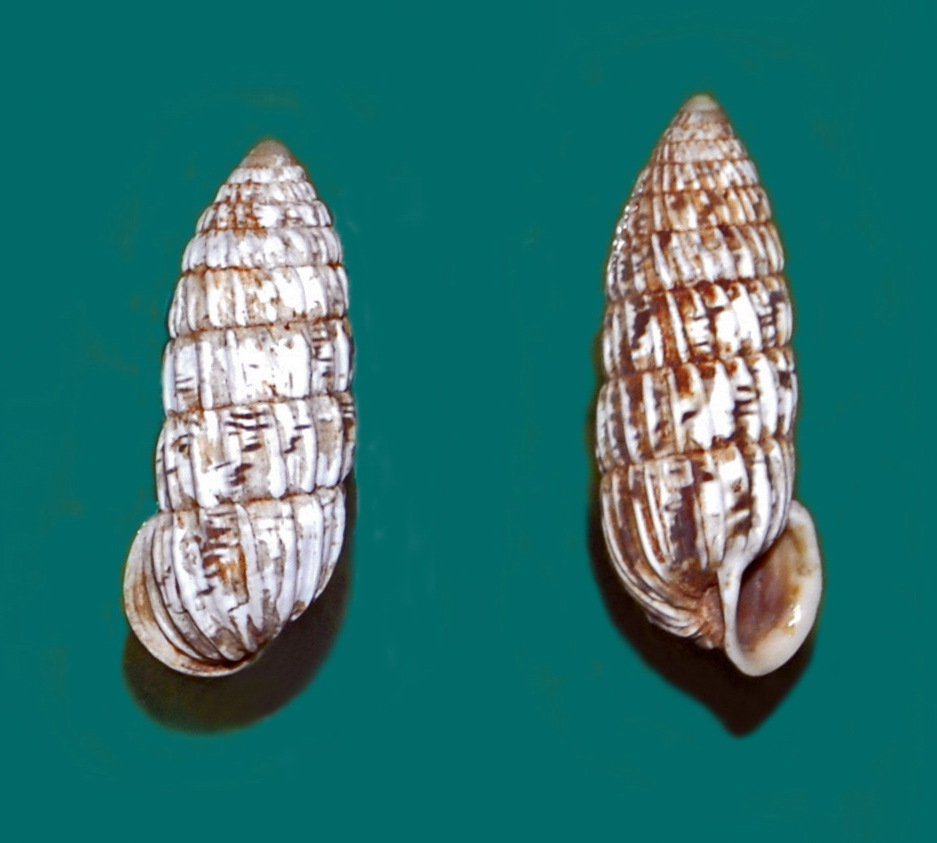
- Shells of Cerion uva

Scientific classification
- Kingdom: Animalia
- Phylum: Mollusca
- Class: Gastropoda
- Order: Stylommatophora
- Family: Cerionidae
- Genus: Cerion
- Species: C. uva

Binomial name
- Cerion uva (Linnaeus, 1758)

Synonyms
- Turbo uva Linnaeus, 1758; Pupa uva (Linnaeus, 1758) Lamarck, 1801; Helix uva (Linnaeus, 1758) Ferussac, 1821; Cochlodon uva (Linnaeus, 1758) Sowerby, 1825; Clausilia uva (Linnaeus, 1758) Anton, 1839; Strophia uva (Linnaeus, 1758) Albers, 1850; Pupa striata Schumacher, 1817, nom. superfl.

= Cerion uva =

Species of gastropod

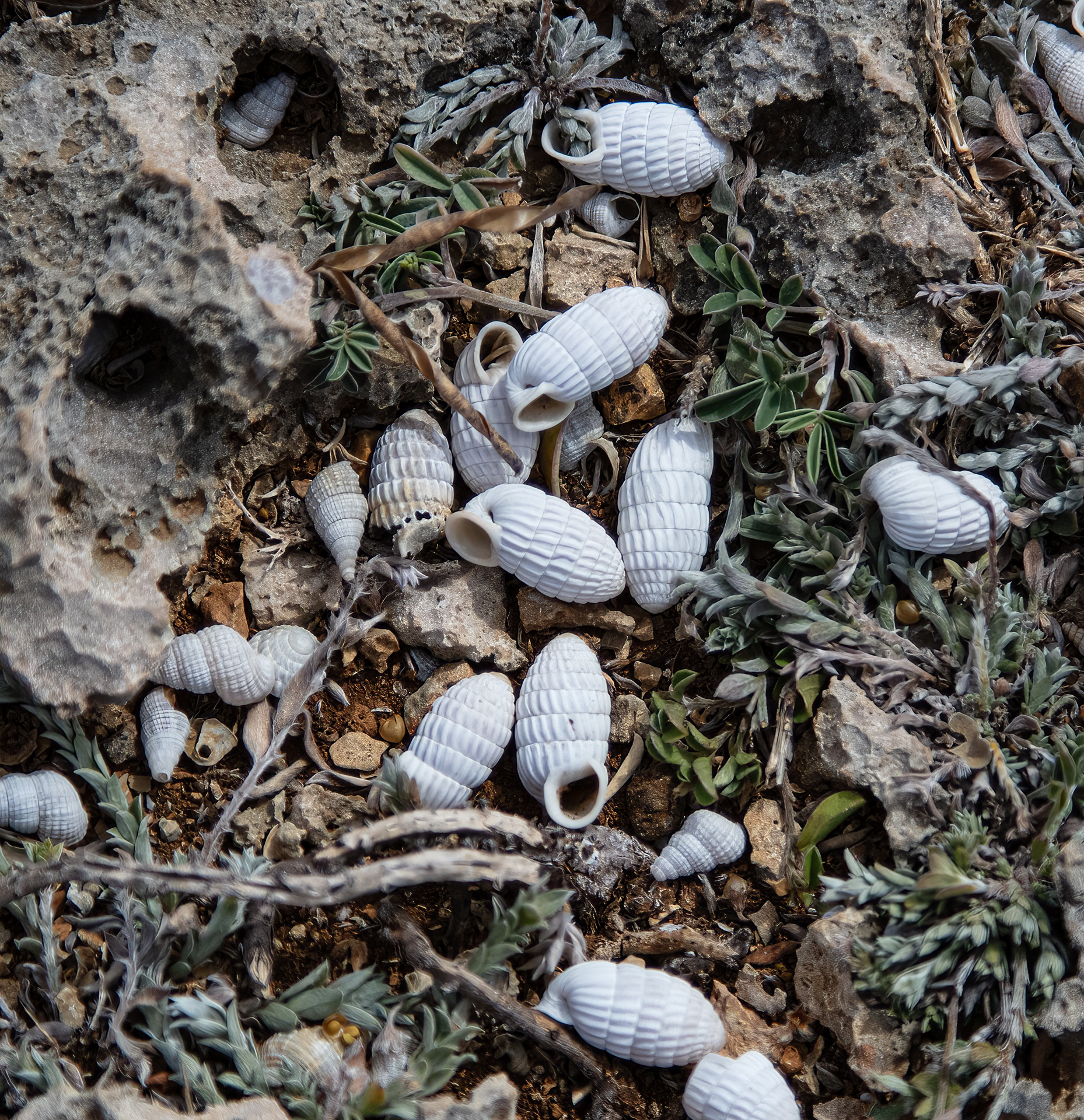
Cerion uva shells, Shete Boka National Park, Curacao

Cerion uva is a species of air-breathing tropical land snail, a terrestrial pulmonate gastropod mollusk in the family Cerionidae, the peanut snails.

== Description ==
Shells of Cerion uva can reach a length of 24 mm. This species shows extensive, geographical variations in whorl size. The shape of the shell of this species changes very much as they grow. In adults, the shells are beehive-shaped, and have an expanded labrum.

== Distribution ==
This species is endemic to the islands of Aruba, Curaçao and Bonaire; many populations are quite different in terms of morphology and represent the diverse makeup of infraspecific taxa.

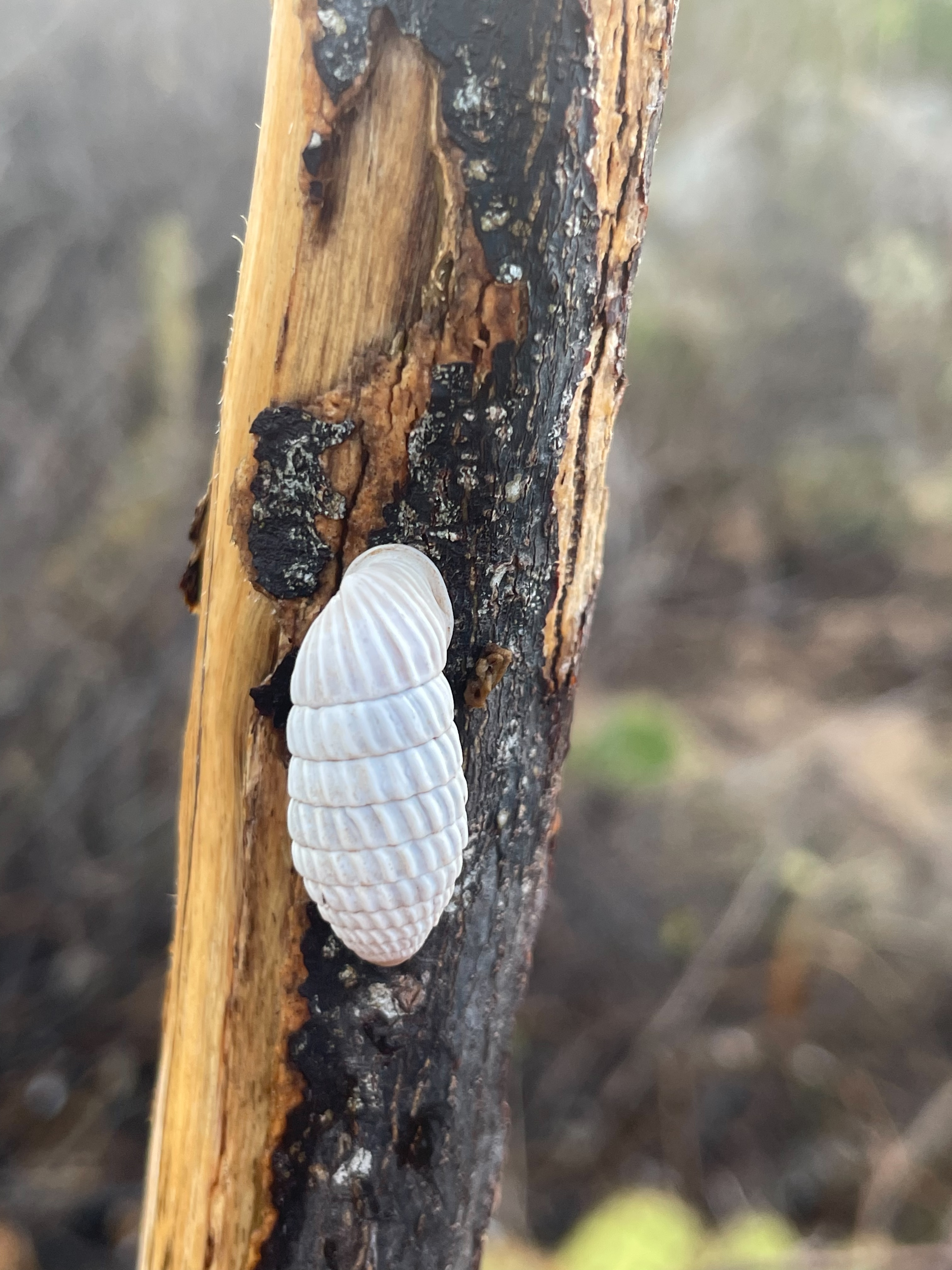
Snail Cerion uva on tree trunk in the Arikok National Park in Aruba

== Infraspecific taxa and type localities ==
In 2014, the constituent forms of Cerion uva were reviewed, and included:

- Cerion uva uva (Linnaeus, 1758) – Type locality: Schaarlo, Willemstad [1285.11′ N, 68854.21′ W]
  - = C. uva arubanum Baker, 1924 – Type locality: Baranca Alto [12828.50′ N, 69857.77′ W]
  - = C. uva desculptum Pilsbry & Vanatta, 1896 – Type Locality: Curaçao
  - = C. uva uva f. hatoensis Baker, 1924 – Type locality: Eastern escarpment of Seroe Spelonk, near Landhuis Hato [12810.71′ N, 68857.92′ W]
- Cerion uva diablensis Baker, 1924 – Type locality: Top of Ronde Klip [1288.98′ N, 68852.02′ W]
- Cerion uva knipensis Baker, 1924 – Type locality: Valley area between Seroes Palomba and Baha
  - = C. uva knipensis f. djerimensis ^{¶} Baker, 1924 – Type locality: Edge of coastal cliffs near Plaja Djermimi [12821.24′ N, 6989.83′ W]
- Cerion uva bonairensis Baker, 1924 – Type locality: Porta Span˜o [12814.06′ N, 68816.68′ W]
  - = C. uva bonairensis f. kralendijki ^{¶} Baker, 1924 – Type locality: South of Kralendijk [1288.08′ N, 68816.68′ W], beside a highway on the western shore of Bonaire

^{¶} : Denotes that this name was published as an infrasubspecific name intended to distinguish populations within subspecies, thus being an unavailable name according to the ICZN.
