= Cerion nanus =

Conservation status
- Critically Endangered (IUCN 2.3)

Scientific classification
- Kingdom: Animalia
- Phylum: Mollusca
- Class: Gastropoda
- Order: Stylommatophora
- Family: Cerionidae
- Genus: Cerion
- Species: C. nanus

Binomial name
- Cerion nanus Maynard, 1889

Species of gastropod

Cerion nanus is a species of medium-sized air-breathing land snail, a terrestrial pulmonate gastropod in the family Cerionidae.

== Distribution and ecology ==
This species is endemic to the island of Little Cayman, Cayman Islands in the Caribbean Sea, where it is found among Evolvulus arbuscula and E. squamosum plants, which grow in this coastal dry limestone shrub. Shells were found in 1975 at three sites, encompassing a total area of 35,000 m^{2} surrounding the North Shore Track. It is sympatric throughout its range with Cerion pannosum, a species with a much larger distribution and shell-size, which has probably ecologically replaced C. nanus. However, this replacement has not yet occurred, suggesting that this species may have never had a larger population. Currently several small populations exist along the Spot Bay Road in numbers far larger than originally suspected. C. nanus can be identified by the color of their shells, which are grayish or white, and emerge from their hibernation during rainy days but are difficult to identify during dry weather.
