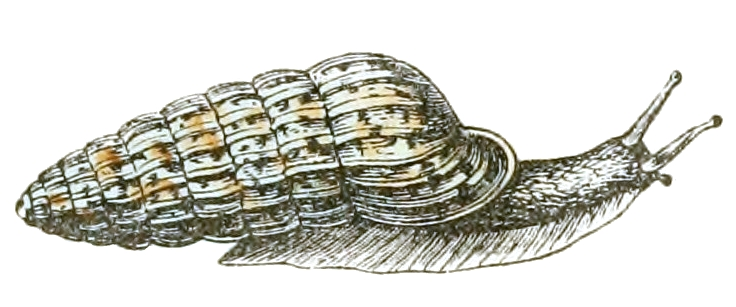
- Drawing of a live individual of Cerion chrysalis

Scientific classification
- Kingdom: Animalia
- Phylum: Mollusca
- Class: Gastropoda
- Order: Stylommatophora
- Infraorder: Helicina
- Superfamily: Urocoptoidea
- Family: Cerionidae
- Genus: Cerion; Röding, 1798

Type species
- Turbo uva Linnaeus, 1758

Species
- See text

= Cerion (gastropod) =

Cerion Temporal range: Early Miocene–Recent

Genus of gastropods

Cerion is a genus of small to medium-sized tropical air-breathing land snails, terrestrial pulmonate gastropods in the family Cerionidae, noted for its extreme morphological diversity. The genus is endemic to the Caribbean region.

Cerion has been a model organism in evolutionary biology. The genus has significantly contributed to scientific understanding of evolutionary processes in insular environments, making it a key subject in biogeographical and ecological research.

== Distribution ==
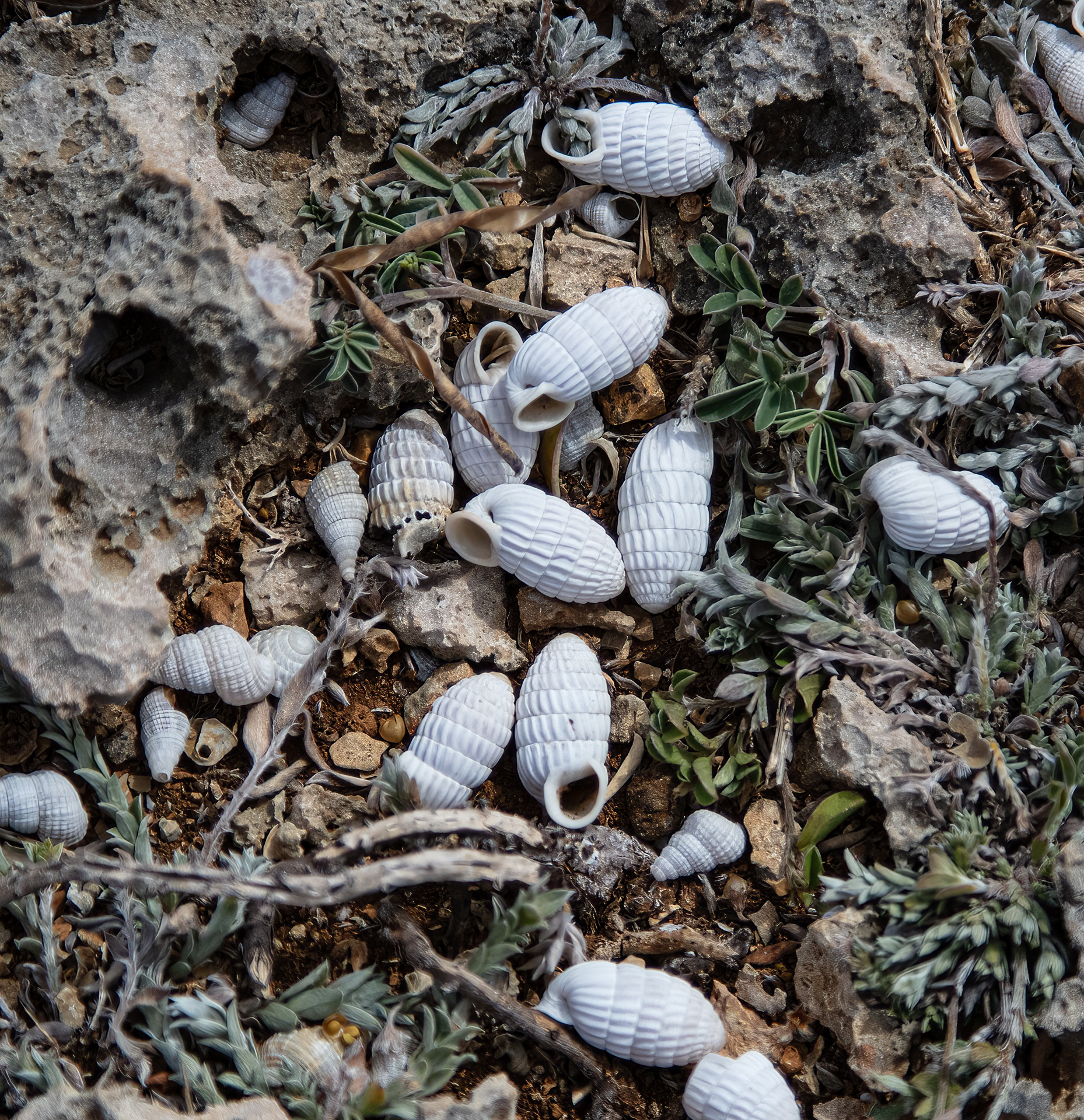

These snails are endemic to islands of the tropical western Atlantic, including southern Florida, The Bahamas, Greater Antilles, Cayman Islands, western Virgin Islands, and Dutch Antilles. They are notable for their absence in Jamaica, the Lesser Antilles, and coastal Central and South America.

=== Ecology ===
Cerionid species inhabit nearshore terrestrial vegetation, usually within a few hundred meters of the shore but occasionally further inland, up to a kilometer away in areas influenced by salt spray. These snails thrive in dense but patchy populations, often numbering over ten thousand individuals. They are more visible in open vegetation and less so in leaf litter. The populations are generally uniform in shell size and morphology, with greater uniformity observed in more isolated populations.

== Morphological diversity ==
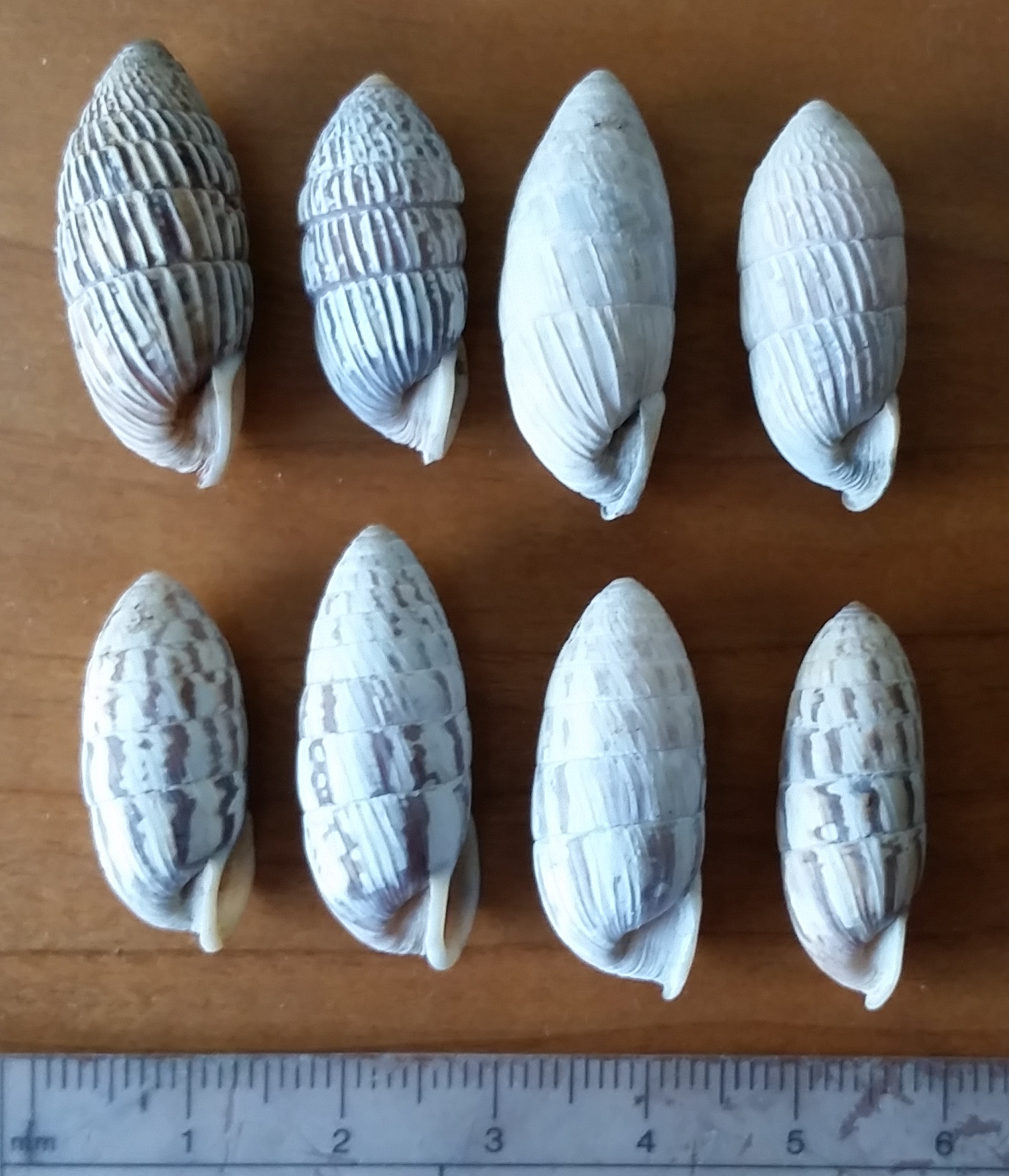
Cerion snail shells collected on Andros Island, Bahamas. Note variation in morphology from ridged to smooth, color in degree of stripedness, and length to width ratio. Scale at bottom is in centimeters.

Cerion is one of the most morphologically diverse genera among land snails. Members of this genus exhibit exceptional morphological diversity, contributing to nearly 500 species recognized. This diversity is primarily manifested in shell form, ranging from spherical to elongated shapes.

Within populations, variation in shell form is typically low; however, distinct populations, can display significant morphological differences. The shells of Cerion species vary considerably even among closely situated populations, sometimes separated by less than 200 meters. Despite differences in various distinctive characters, many of these populations are capable of hybridization.

== Taxonomy ==
First described by Röding in 1798, Cerion includes the type species Turbo uva Linnaeus, 1758. The genus represents one of the most challenging groups in pulmonate mollusk classification, often described as a "taxonomic morass" due to its extreme morphological diversity and the frequent hybridization at geographic contact points. This complexity is compounded by the ability of different morphotypes to interbreed, blurring traditional species boundaries.

In a notable revision by Stephen Jay Gould and David S. Woodruff in 1986, the taxonomy of Cerion on New Providence Island was simplified from over 90 designated species to just two semispecies, Cerion glans and Cerion gubernatorium, based on morphometric and genetic analyses, highlighting the importance of combining multidisciplinary criteria in taxonomic revisions.

Cerion has been subject to reclassification, particularly concerning its relationship with the New World Urocoptidae based on genital characteristics and kidney morphology. Recent molecular studies using 28S rRNA sequence data have supported the classification of Cerionidae within the new superfamily Urocoptoidea, which also includes the North American and circum-Caribbean Urocoptidae.

=== Evolution ===
Research has explored the relationships between morphological variations and genetic differences, the dynamics of hybrid zones, and the persistence of hybrids over time. Studies have shown that morphological variations are stable over time, suggesting a strong genetic component influenced by limited gene flow between populations.

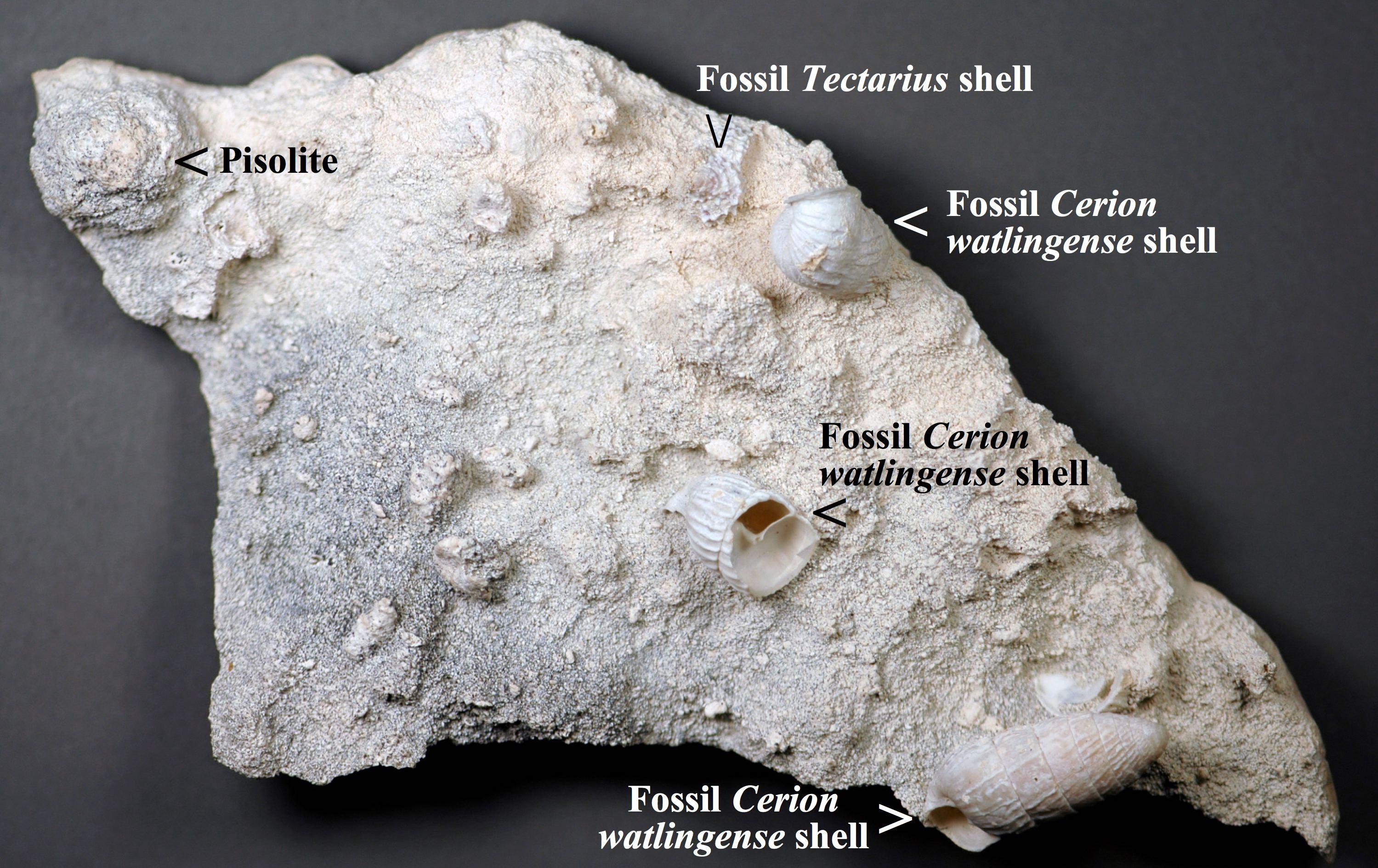
Calcrete paleosol from San Salvador Island's bedrock. This Late Pleistocene calcrete has three fossil Cerion land snail shells, along with a fossil Tectarius snail shell, in cemented lime sand. Calcretes are lithified soil horizons, and are composed of calcium carbonate (CaCO3).

The fossil range of Cerion is possibly from the Upper Cretaceous of Montana, or the early Miocene of Florida. Records of Cerion in Pleistocene are rare. Fossil records, particularly from the Quaternary period, reveal patterns and trends that provide insights into these evolutionary processes.

Paleontological studies suggest that the genus, possibly originating from the late Cretaceous of North America and subsequently diversifying in the Caribbean through a series of vicariance and dispersal events. The evolutionary trajectory of Cerion lineages is marked by significant morphological change, potentially driven by hybridization and geographical isolation events during glacial and interglacial periods.

== Species ==
Species within the genus Cerion include:

- Cerion acuticostatum Sánchez Roig, 1948
- Cerion aguayoi Torre & Clench, 1932
- Cerion alberti Clench & Aguayo, 1949
- Cerion alleni Torre, 1929
- Cerion anodonta
- Cerion arangoi (Pilsbry & Vanatta, 1896)
- Cerion banesense Clench & Aguayo, 1949
- Cerion barroi Aguayo & Jaume, 1957
- Cerion basistriatum Pilsbry & Vanatta, 1895
- Cerion bioscai Aguayo & Jaume, 1951
- Cerion blanesi Clench & Aguayo, 1951
- Cerion cabocruzense Pilsbry & Torre, 1943
- Cerion capraia
- Cerion caroli Aguayo & Torre, 1951
- Cerion casablancae Bartsch, 1920
- Cerion catherwoodianum Wurtz, 1950
- Cerion ceiba Clench, 1948
- Cerion chaparra Aguayo & Sánchez Roig, 1953
- Cerion chaplini Wurtz, 1950
- Cerion chrysalis(Ferussac in Beck, 1837)
- Cerion chrysaloides
- Cerion circumscriptum Aguayo & Jaume, 1951
- Cerion cisneroi Clench & Aguayo, 1951
- Cerion cobarrubia Aguayo & Jaume, 1951
- Cerion columbiana
- Cerion columbinus Sánchez Roig, 1951
- Cerion coutini Sánchez Roig, 1951
- Cerion crassilabris
- Cerion crassiusculum Torre in Pilsbry & Vanatta, 1899
- Cerion cyclostomum (Küster, 1841)
- Cerion dimidiatum (Pfeiffer, 1847)
- Cerion disforme Clench & Aguayo, 1946
- Cerion dorotheae Aguayo & Jaume, 1951
- Cerion ebriolum Aguayo & Jaume, 1951
- Cerion evolva
- Cerion fasciata
- Cerion feltoni Sánchez Roig, 1951
- Cerion floridanum
- Cerion geophilum Clench & Aguayo, 1949
- Cerion glans (Küster, 1844)
- Cerion grilloensis Sánchez Roig, 1951
- Cerion grisea
- Cerion gundlachi (Pfeiffer, 1852)
- Cerion herrerai Aguayo & Jaume, 1951
- Cerion hessei Clench & Aguayo, 1949
- Cerion humberti Clench & Aguayo, 1949
- Cerion hyperlissum Pilsbry & Vanatta, 1896
- Cerion incanum (Leidy, 1851)
- Cerion incrassatum (Sowerby, 1876)
- Cerion infandulum Aguayo & Torre, 1951
- Cerion infandum (Shuttleworth in Poey, 1858)
- Cerion iostomum (Pfeiffer, 1854)
- Cerion johnsoni Pilsbry & Vanatta, 1895
- Cerion josephi Clench & Aguayo, 1949
- Cerion kusteri (Pfeiffer, 1854)
- Cerion laureani Clench & Aguayo, 1951
- Cerion longidens Pilsbry, 1902
- Cerion macrodon Aguayo & Jaume, 1951
- Cerion magister Pilsbry & Vanatta, 1896
- Cerion manatiense Aguayo & Jaume, 1951
- Cerion marielinum Torre in Pilsbry, 1927
- Cerion maritimum (Pfeiffer, 1839)
- Cerion microdon Pilsbry & Vanatta, 1896
- Cerion microstonum (Pfeiffer, 1854)
- Cerion miramarae Sánchez Roig, 1951
- Cerion multicostum (Küster, 1845)
- Cerion mumia (Bruguière, 1792)
- Cerion mumiola (Pfeiffer, 1839)
- Cerion nanus (Maynard, 1889)
- Cerion nipense Aguayo, 1953
- Cerion obesum
- Cerion orientale Clench & Aguayo, 1951
- Cerion palmeri Sánchez Roig, 1948
- Cerion pandionis Aguayo & Jaume, 1951
- Cerion paredonis Pilsbry, 1902
- Cerion pastelilloensis Sánchez Roig, 1951
- Cerion paucicostatum Torre, 1929
- Cerion paucisculptum Clench & Aguayo, 1952
- Cerion peracutum Clench & Aguayo, 1951
- Cerion persuasa
- Cerion pilsbryi
- Cerion pinerium Dall, 1895
- Cerion politum (Maynard, 1896)
- Cerion prestoni Sánchez Roig, 1951
- Cerion pretiosus Sánchez Roig, 1951
- Cerion pseudocyclostomum Aguayo & Sánchez Roig, 1953
- Cerion pupilla
- Cerion ramsdeni Torre in Welch, 1934
- Cerion regina
- Cerion regula
- Cerion restricta
- Cerion ricardi Clench & Aguayo, 1951
- Cerion rodrigoi Gould, 1997
- Cerion saccharimeta
- Cerion saetiae Sánchez Roig, 1948
- Cerion sagraianum (Pfeiffer, 1847)
- Cerion sainthilarius Sánchez Roig, 1951
- Cerion sallei
- Cerion salvatori Torre in Pilsbry, 1927
- Cerion sanctacruzense Aguayo & Jaume, 1951
- Cerion sanctamariae Aguayo & Jaume, 1951
- Cerion sanzi Blanes in Pilsbry & Vanatta, 1898
- Cerion scalarinum (Gundlach in Pfeiffer, 1860)
- Cerion scopulorum Aguayo & Jaume, 1951
- Cerion sculptum (Poey, 1858)
- Cerion sisal Clench & Aguayo, 1952
- Cerion striatellum
- Cerion stupida
- Cerion tanamensis Sánchez Roig, 1951
- Cerion tenuilabre (Gundlach in Pfeiffer, 1870)
- Cerion torrei Blanes in Pilsbry & Vanatta, 1898
- Cerion tridentatun Pilsbry & Vanatta, 1895
- Cerion uva (Linnaeus, 1758)
- Cerion vaccinum
- Cerion vanattai Clench & Aguayo, 1951
- Cerion venustum (Poey, 1858)
- Cerion viaregis Bartsch, 1920
- Cerion victor Torre, 1929
- Cerion vulneratum (Küster, 1855)
- Cerion watlingense Dall, 1907
- Cerion yumaensis
