= Cerion paucisculptum =

Scientific classification
- Kingdom: Animalia
- Phylum: Mollusca
- Class: Gastropoda
- Order: Stylommatophora
- Family: Cerionidae
- Genus: Cerion
- Species: C. paucisculptum

Binomial name
- Cerion paucisculptum Clench & Aguayo, 1952

Species of terrestrial gastropod

Cerion paucisculptum is a species of terrestrial gastropod in the family Cerionidae, endemic to the Sama Bay area in Cuba. The type locality is Punta de Música, Samá Bay, and this species may already be extinct as it was last collected when the Samá Bay area was less disturbed and the distribution of endemic cerionids was more contiguous. however, C. banesense (another native species) is also found in the Arroyo Seco, Río Seco, and Ensenada de Río Seco areas which are within the immediate vicinity of the type locality- Cerion paucisculptum may still occur alongside Cerion banesense.
