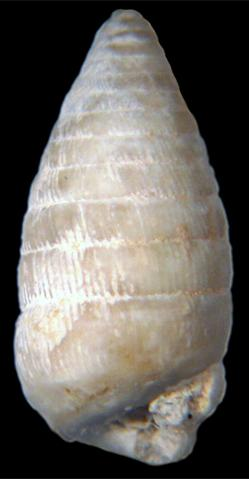

Scientific classification
- Kingdom: Animalia
- Phylum: Mollusca
- Class: Gastropoda
- Order: Stylommatophora
- Family: Cerionidae
- Genus: †Brasilennea
- Species: †B. guttula

Binomial name
- †Brasilennea guttula Salvador & Simone, 2012

= Brasilennea guttula =

Brasilennea guttula Temporal range: Paleocene

Extinct species of gastropod

Brasilennea guttula is a fossil species of air-breathing land snail, a terrestrial pulmonate gastropod mollusc in the family Cerionidae, from the Paleocene Itaboraí Basin, Brazil. Brasilennea guttula shows a peculiar shell shape, distinct from the other species in the genus; the shape is reminiscent of a water drop, which led to the specific epithet of Brasilennea guttula.
