= Cerion iostomum =

Scientific classification
- Kingdom: Animalia
- Phylum: Mollusca
- Class: Gastropoda
- Order: Stylommatophora
- Family: Cerionidae
- Genus: Cerion
- Species: C. iostomum

Binomial name
- Cerion iostomum (Pfeiffer, 1854)

Synonyms
- Pupa iostoma Pfeiffer, 1854

Species of gastropod

Cerion iostomum is a species of air-breathing tropical land snail, a terrestrial pulmonate gastropod mollusk in the family Cerionidae.

== Distribution ==
Cuba
