= Cerion politum =

Scientific classification
- Domain: Eukaryota
- Kingdom: Animalia
- Phylum: Mollusca
- Class: Gastropoda
- Order: Stylommatophora
- Family: Cerionidae
- Genus: Cerion
- Species: C. politum

Binomial name
- Cerion politum (Maynard, 1896)

Species of gastropod

Cerion politum is a species of Caribbean land snail, a mollusk in the family Cerionidae, which is found only in Maisí in the Guantánamo Province of Cuba. It was discovered by Charles Johnson Maynard and cited by him in 1896.
