= Cerion prestoni =

Scientific classification
- Domain: Eukaryota
- Kingdom: Animalia
- Phylum: Mollusca
- Class: Gastropoda
- Order: Stylommatophora
- Family: Cerionidae
- Genus: Cerion
- Species: C. prestoni

Binomial name
- Cerion prestoni Sanchez Roig, 1951

Species of snail

Cerion prestoni is a species of terrestrial gastropod in the family Cerionidae, endemic to Preston by Nipe Bay, Cuba. This species is morphologically similar to other cerionids in the 'scalarinum complex', however it differs from most species in having thick, striated ribs. This species complex represents an interesting divergence in Cuban cerionid forms, possessing several unique features.
