= Cymbomorphini =

Scientific classification
- Domain: Eukaryota
- Kingdom: Animalia
- Phylum: Arthropoda
- Class: Insecta
- Order: Hemiptera
- Suborder: Auchenorrhyncha
- Family: Membracidae
- Subfamily: Darninae
- Tribe: Cymbomorphini; Haupt, 1929

Tribe of treehoppers

Cymbomorphini is a tribe of treehoppers discovered by Hermann Haupt in 1929. It is commonly found in South and Central America. It has four genera.

== Genera ==
These are the genera of the tribe Cymbomorphini:

- Cymbomorpha Stål, 1866
- Eumela Stål, 1867
- Fermaria Sakakibara, 2000
- Germariana Sakakibara, 1998
