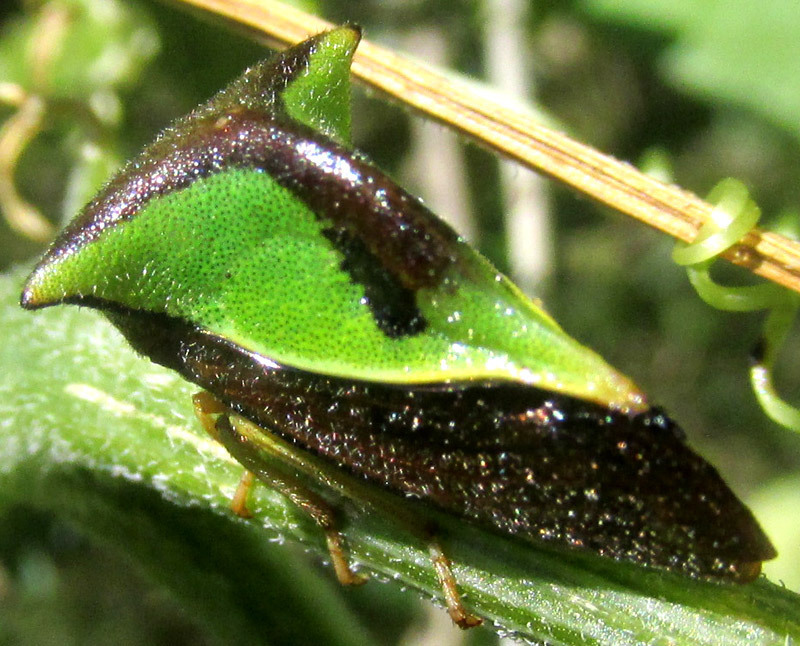
- Hyphinoe camelus

Scientific classification
- Kingdom: Animalia
- Phylum: Arthropoda
- Clade: Pancrustacea
- Class: Insecta
- Order: Hemiptera
- Suborder: Auchenorrhyncha
- Family: Membracidae
- Subfamily: Darninae
- Tribe: Hyphinoini
- Genus: Hyphinoe; Stål, 1867

= Hyphinoe =

Genus of insects in the family of treehoppers

Hyphinoe is a genus of insects in the family of treehoppers and thornbugs, the Membracidae.

== Species ==
There are 16 species of Hyphinoe as of August 2025:

- Hyphinoe asphaltina (Fairmaire, 1846)
- Hyphinoe camelus (Gray, 1832)
- Hyphinoe cornuta Distant, 1879
- Hyphinoe diabolica Butler, 1878
- Hyphinoe hirsuta (Buckton, 1905)
- Hyphinoe inermis Goding, 1926
- Hyphinoe latifrons (Fowler, 1895)
- Hyphinoe marginalis Fallou, 1890
- Hyphinoe obesa (Buckton, 1903)
- Hyphinoe obliqua (Walker, 1858)
- Hyphinoe ochracea Fowler, 1895
- Hyphinoe placida (Germar, 1835)
- Hyphinoe purulensis Fowler, 1895
- Hyphinoe quadrimaculata Buckton, 1902
- Hyphinoe vulpecula Fowler, 1895
- Hyphinoe yaguachiensis Goding, 1929
