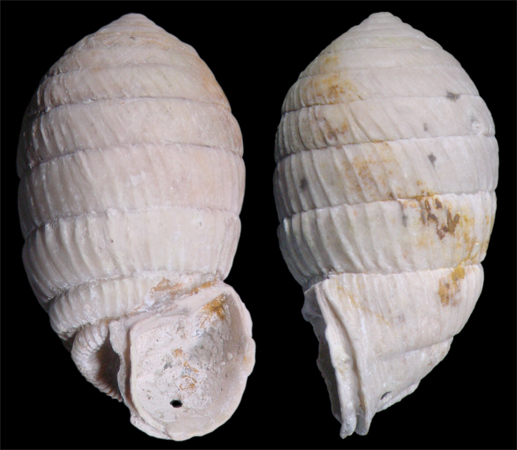
- Brasilennea arethusae

Scientific classification
- Domain: Eukaryota
- Kingdom: Animalia
- Phylum: Mollusca
- Class: Gastropoda
- Order: Stylommatophora
- Family: Cerionidae
- Genus: †Brasilennea; Maury, 1935

Type species
- †B. arethusae Maury 1935

Species
- †Brasilennea arethusae; †Brasilennea guttula; †Brasilennea minor

Diversity
- 3 extinct species

= Brasilennea =

Brasilennea Temporal range: Paleocene (Itaboraian) Paleocene

Extinct genus of gastropods

Brasilennea is a fossil genus of small to medium-sized air-breathing land snails, terrestrial pulmonate gastropods in the family Cerionidae. The genus is known only from the Brazilian Paleocene Itaboraí Basin, in Rio de Janeiro. The most characteristic feature of the genus is its two spiral furrows on the body whorl.

The generic name Brasilennea originally intended to imply that it is a Brazilian genus that is very similar and related to the African genus Ennea. This is no longer the case, however: while the genus was originally classified in the family Streptaxidae, Brasilennea was then later transferred to the family Cerionidae.

== Species ==
Species within the genus Brasilennea include:

- †Brasilennea arethusae Maury, 1935 - type species of genus
- †Brasilennea guttula Salvador & Simone, 2012
- †Brasilennea minor Trindade, 1956
