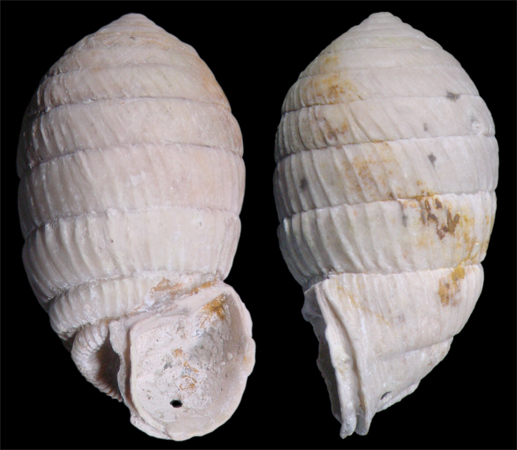
- apertural and lateral view of Brasilennea arethusae

Scientific classification
- Kingdom: Animalia
- Phylum: Mollusca
- Class: Gastropoda
- Order: Stylommatophora
- Family: Cerionidae
- Genus: †Brasilennea
- Species: †B. arethusae

Binomial name
- †Brasilennea arethusae Maury, 1935

= Brasilennea arethusae =

Brasilennea arethusae Temporal range: Paleocene (Itaboraian) ~Paleocene

Extinct species of gastropod

Brasilennea arethusae is a fossil species of air-breathing land snail, a terrestrial pulmonate gastropod mollusk in the family Cerionidae, from the Paleocene Itaboraí Basin, Brazil. Brasilennea arethusae is the largest species in the genus Brasilennea. It was one of the first fossils found in Itaboraí Basin and its name makes reference to the fact that it is a terrestrial species: the name is in honor of Arethusa, a sylvan nymph and one of the Hesperides from Greek mythology.
