= Cerion disforme =

Scientific classification
- Kingdom: Animalia
- Phylum: Mollusca
- Class: Gastropoda
- Order: Stylommatophora
- Family: Cerionidae
- Genus: Cerion
- Species: C. disforme

Binomial name
- Cerion disforme Clench & Aguayo, 1946

Species of gastropod

Cerion disforme is a species of terrestrial gastropod in the family Cerionidae. The nominal subspecies of C. disforme is endemic to various parapatric microhabitats associated with karst rocks and xerophytic palms and evergreen forest. C. disforme nodali however occurs in small dunes littered with rocky substrates, and also shares the evergreen forest ecotone with the nominal subspecies, in which it is found on leaves and branches. Despite sharing ecotones and various habits, there has been a significant divergence and speciation among the Holguín cerionids- within the vicinity of Morales Beach and Punta Manolito in the Ramón de Antillo Peninsula there is one of the greatest concentrations of Cerion diversity in the Caribbean.

== Distribution ==
Endemic to beaches in Holguín Province, Cuba.
