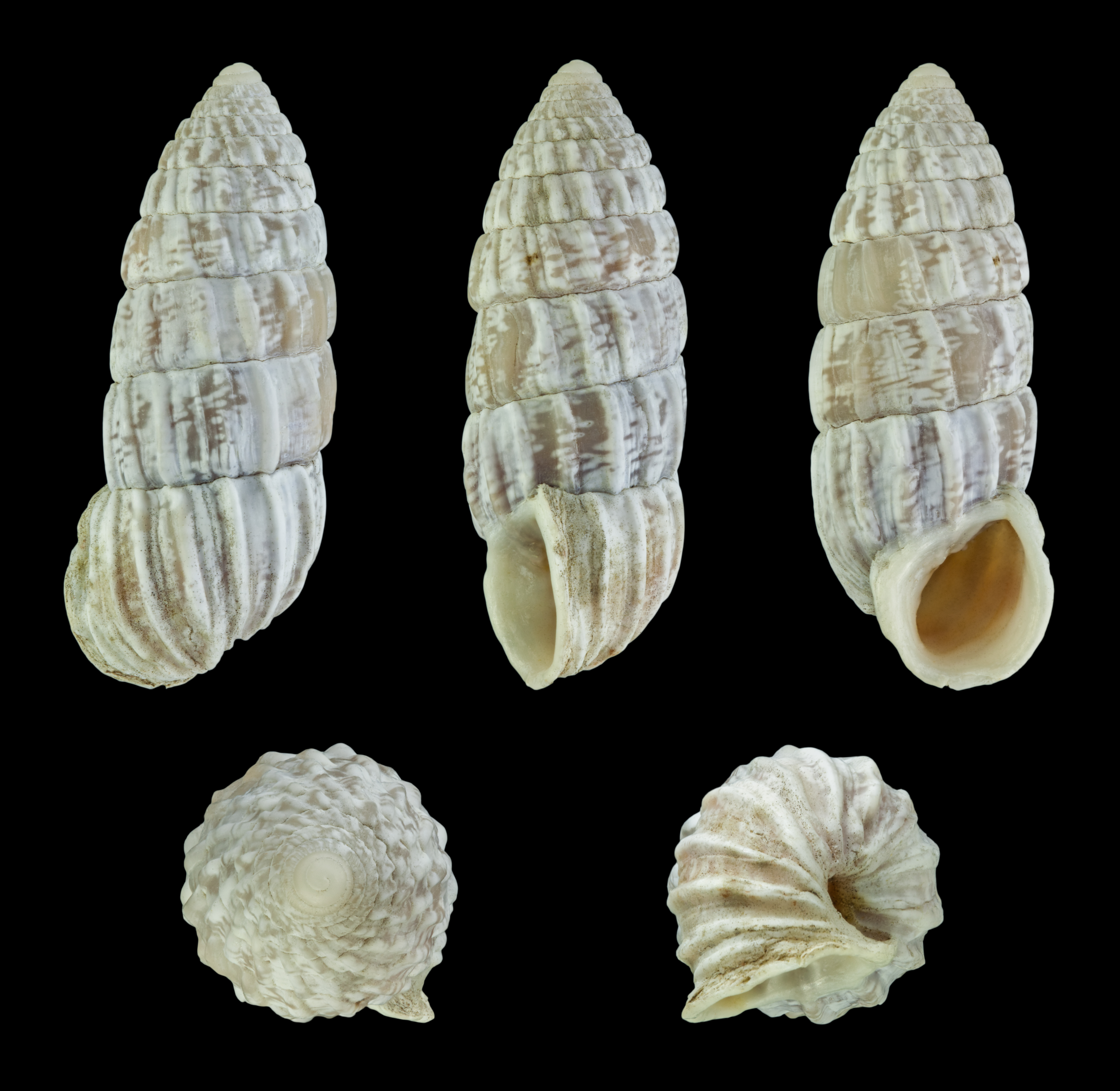

Conservation status
- Secure (NatureServe)

Scientific classification
- Kingdom: Animalia
- Phylum: Mollusca
- Class: Gastropoda
- Order: Stylommatophora
- Family: Cerionidae
- Genus: Cerion
- Species: C. chrysalis

Binomial name
- Cerion chrysalis (Ferussac ex Beck 1837)

= Cerion chrysalis =

Species of gastropod

Cerion chrysalis is a species of air-breathing tropical land snail, a terrestrial pulmonate gastropod mollusk in the family Cerionidae, the peanut snails. It is native to Cuba (type locality near Cabañas Fort, Havana) and specimens have been recorded as introduced to sites in the Florida Keys (e.g., Garden Key and Loggerhead Key).
