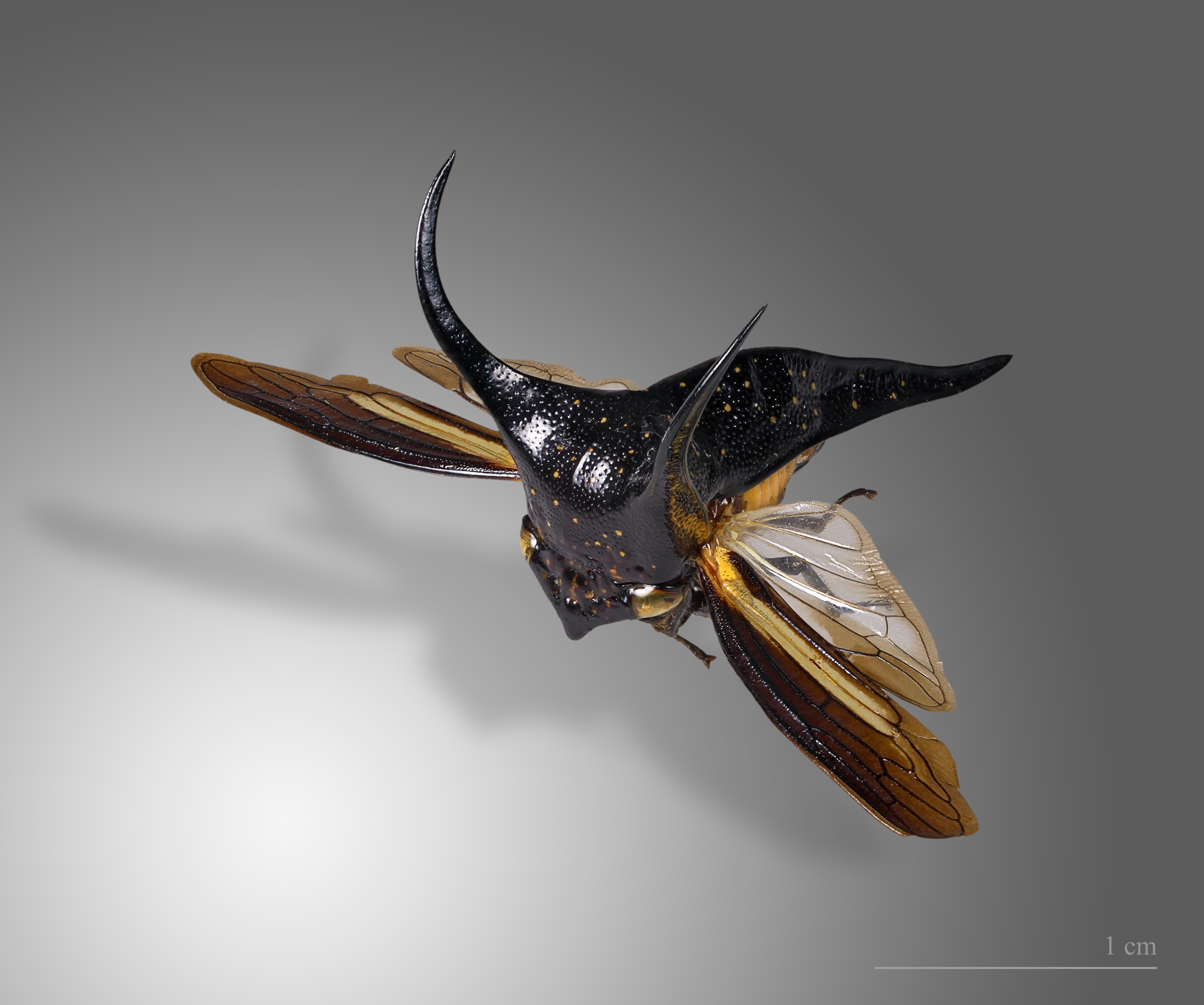
- Hemikyptha marginata in the Toulouse Museum

Scientific classification
- Domain: Eukaryota
- Kingdom: Animalia
- Phylum: Arthropoda
- Class: Insecta
- Order: Hemiptera
- Suborder: Auchenorrhyncha
- Family: Membracidae
- Tribe: Hemikypthini
- Genus: Hemikyptha; Metcalf, 1927

= Hemikyptha =

Genus of insects

Hemikyptha is a genus of treehoppers belonging to the subfamily Darninae. It was first described by Zeno Payne Metcalf in 1927, and contains 7 species.

== Distribution ==
Hemikyptha is found across South America, including southern Central America.

== Species ==
3I World Auchenorrhyncha Database lists the following species:

- Hemikyptha atrata Fonseca & Diringshofen, 1969
- Hemikyptha crux (Linnaeus, 1758)
- Hemikyptha durantoni Arnaud, 2002
- Hemikyptha gigas Fonseca, 1935
- Hemikyptha marginata (Fabricius, 1787)
- Hemikyptha punctata (Fabricius, 1775)
- Hemikyptha scutelligera (Lesson, 1832)
