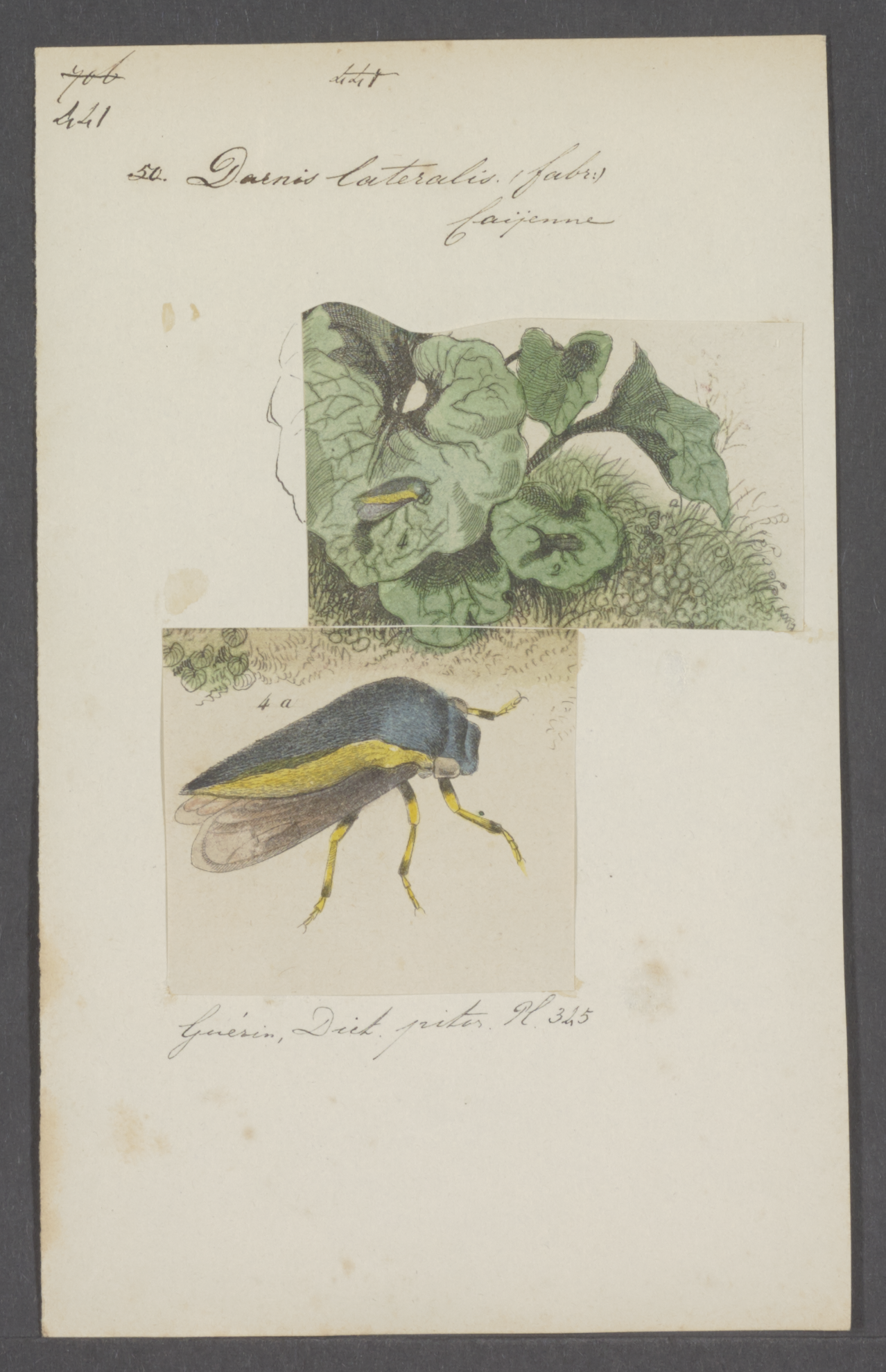

Scientific classification
- Domain: Eukaryota
- Kingdom: Animalia
- Phylum: Arthropoda
- Class: Insecta
- Order: Hemiptera
- Suborder: Auchenorrhyncha
- Family: Membracidae
- Subfamily: Darninae
- Tribe: Darnini
- Genus: Darnis; Fabricius, 1803

= Darnis (treehopper) =

Genus of treehoppers

Darnis is a genus of treehoppers belonging to the subfamily Darninae, from the Americas.

== Species ==
Darnis includes:

- Darnis cuneata (Butler, 1878)
- Darnis cyclops Fairmaire, 1846
- Darnis lateralis (Coquebert, 1801)
- Darnis latior Fowler, 1894
- Darnis olivacea Fabricius, 1803
- Darnis partita Walker, 1858
- Darnis trifasciata Fabricius, 1803
