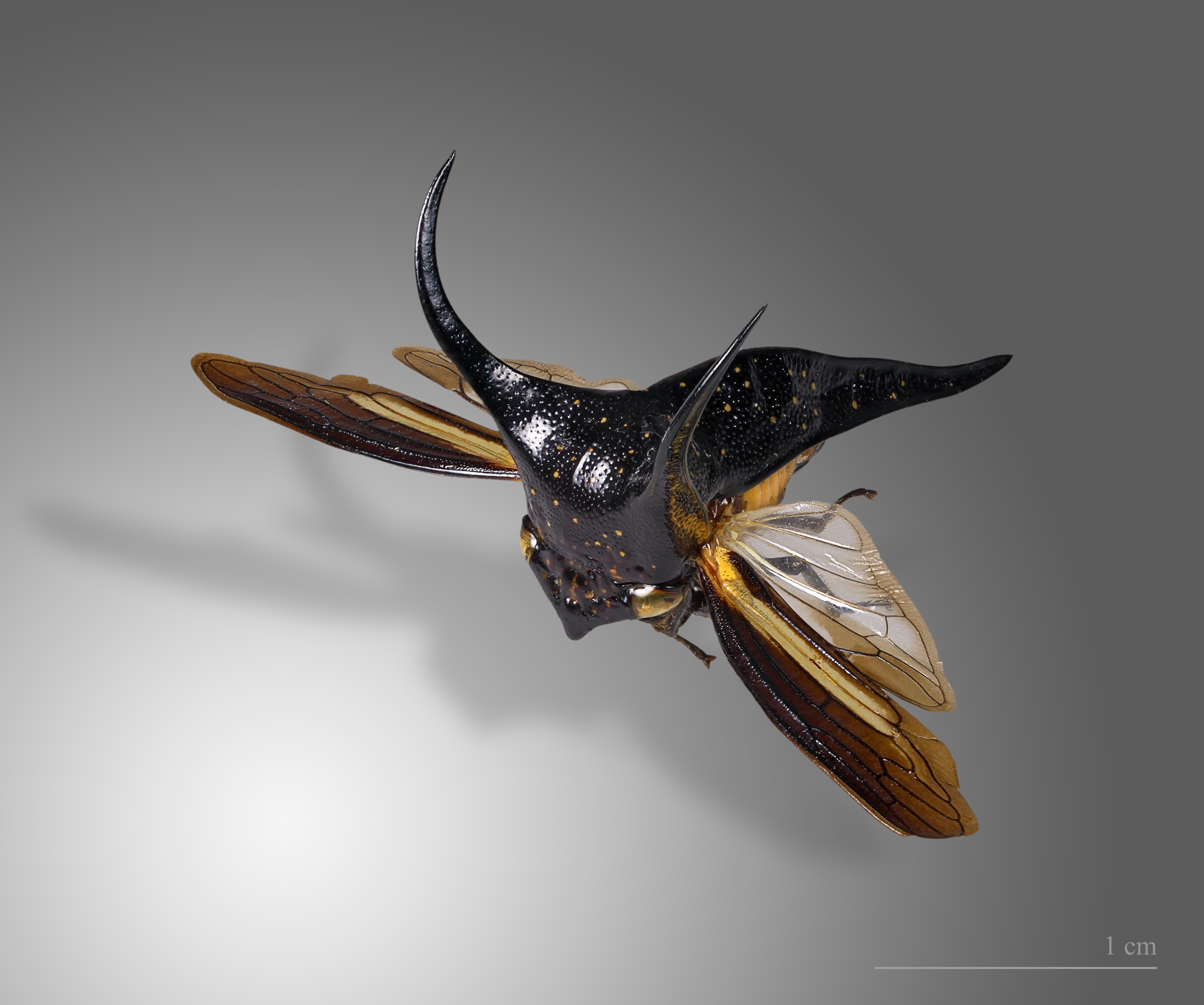

Scientific classification
- Domain: Eukaryota
- Kingdom: Animalia
- Phylum: Arthropoda
- Class: Insecta
- Order: Hemiptera
- Suborder: Auchenorrhyncha
- Family: Membracidae
- Subfamily: Darninae
- Tribe: Hemikypthini; Goding, 1929

= Hemikypthini =

Tribe of insects

Hemikypthini is a tribe of treehoppers in the subfamily Darninae. It contains 3 genera.

== Genera ==
- Atypa
- Hemikyptha
- Neoproterpia
