= Cerion alberti =

Scientific classification
- Kingdom: Animalia
- Phylum: Mollusca
- Class: Gastropoda
- Order: Stylommatophora
- Family: Cerionidae
- Genus: Cerion
- Species: C. alberti

Binomial name
- Cerion alberti Clench & Aguayo, 1949

Species of terrestrial gastropod

Cerion alberti is a species of terrestrial gastropod in the family Cerionidae. It is endemic to coastal vegetation in the Ramón de Antilla Peninsula, Cuba. C. alberti is the most restricted species of Cerion in the Holguin Province, occurring within only 1 km^{2} of sea grapes and coastal vegetation. Historical collections have reported a Cañón de Banes locality, in which several species including C. alberti occur.
