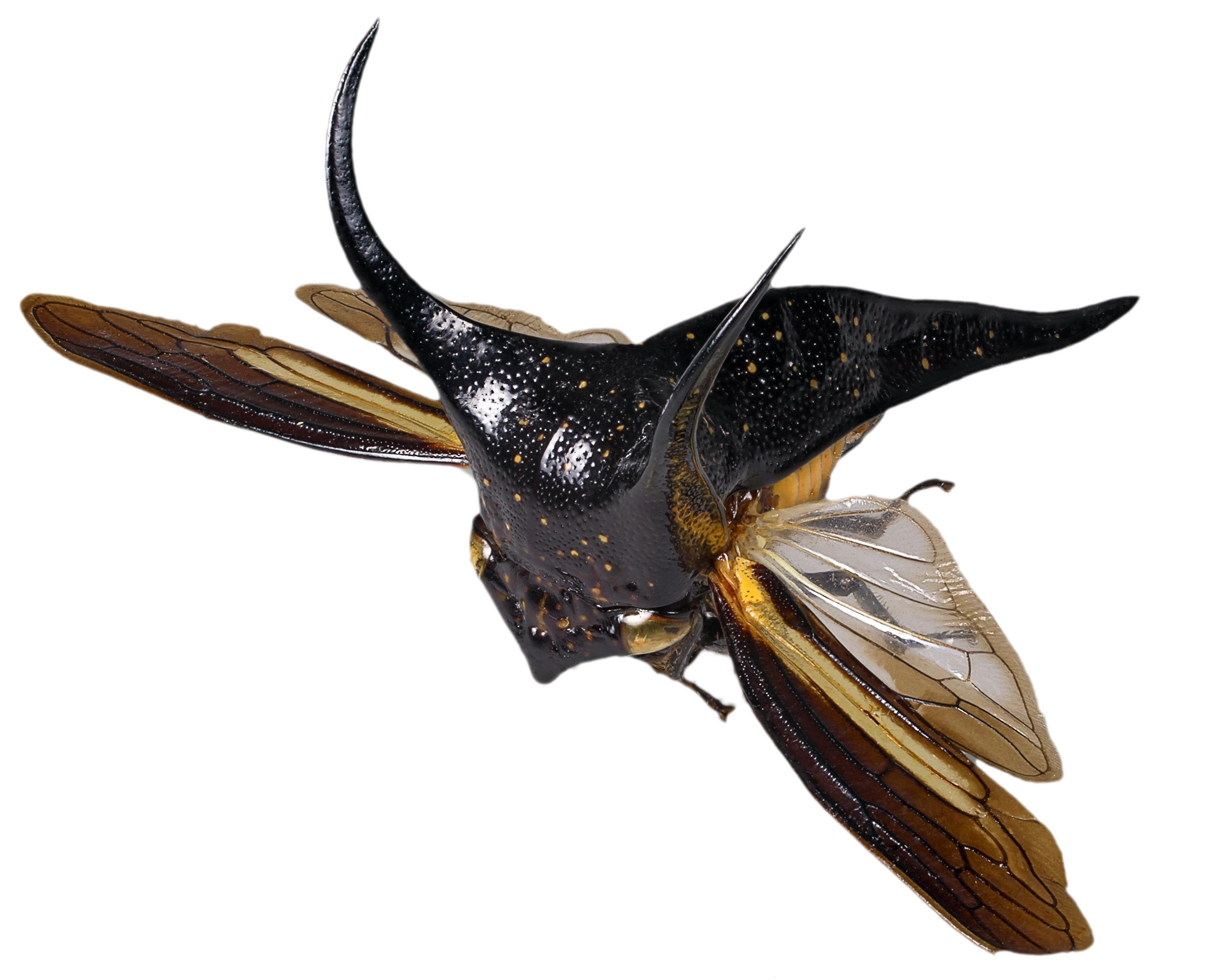
- Hemikyptha marginata

Scientific classification
- Domain: Eukaryota
- Kingdom: Animalia
- Phylum: Arthropoda
- Class: Insecta
- Order: Hemiptera
- Suborder: Auchenorrhyncha
- Family: Membracidae
- Subfamily: Darninae; Amyot & Serville, 1843

Type genus
- Darnis Fabricius, 1803

= Darninae =

Subfamily of insects

Darninae is a subfamily of treehoppers belonging to the family Membracidae. It includes 5 tribes and about 30 genera.

== Tribes and genera ==
- Cymbomorphini
  - Cymbomorpha
  - Eumela
  - Fermeria
  - Germariana
- Darnini
  - Alcmeone
  - Allocyphotes
  - Alobia
  - Andinodarnis
  - Cyphotes
  - Darnis
  - Dectonura
  - Hebetica
  - Hebeticoides
  - Hypheodana
  - Leptosticta
  - Nasuconia
  - Ochrolomia
  - Peltosticta
  - Stictopelta
  - Sundarion
  - Taunaya
- Hemikypthini
  - Atypa
  - Hemikyptha
  - Neoproterpia
- Hyphinoini
  - Bubalopa
  - Eualthe
  - Hanstruempelia
  - Hyphinoe
  - Tomogonia
- Procyrtini
  - Procyrta
