= Phenotypic disparity =

Phenotypic differentiation within groups like species or higher taxa

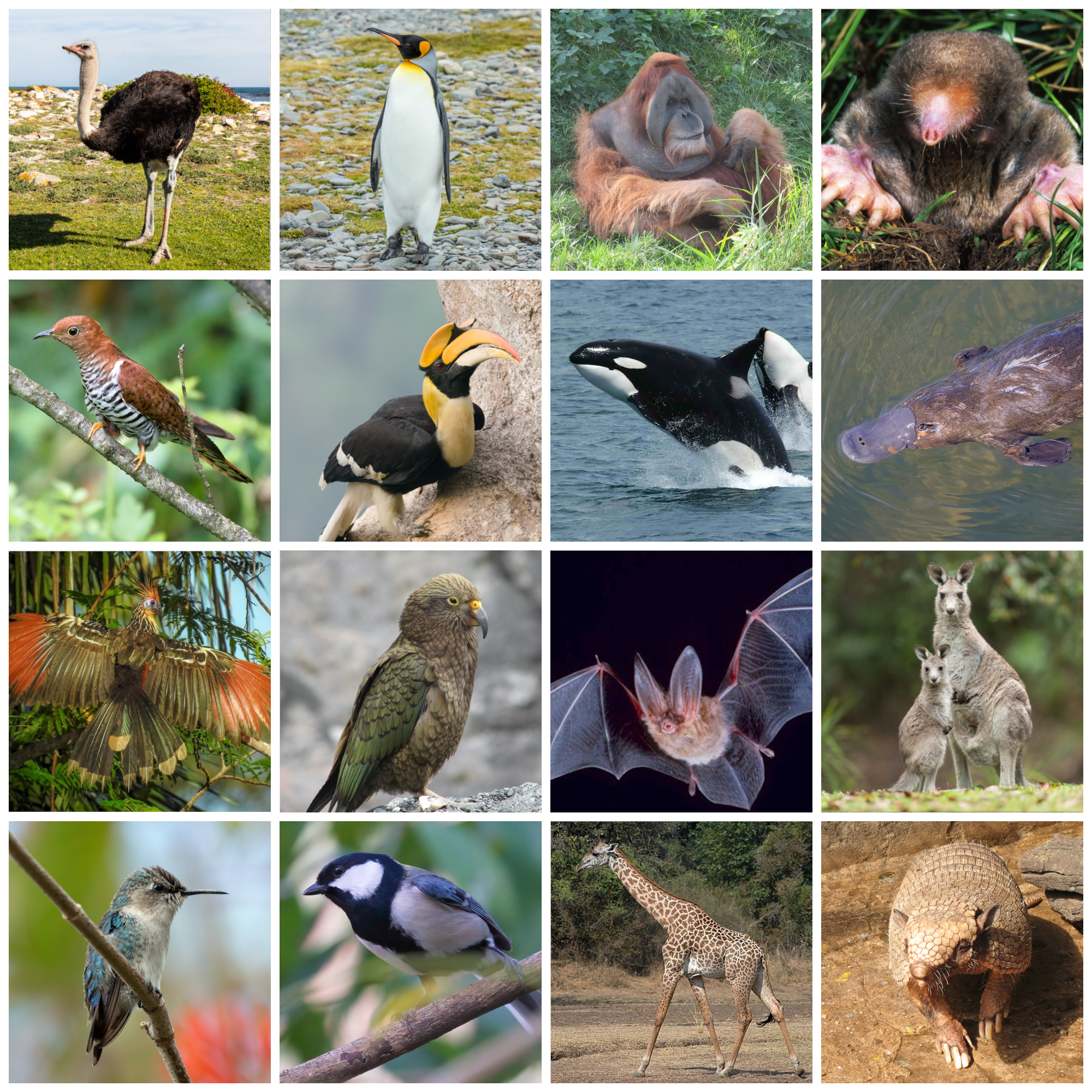
Birds have greater species richness than mammals, while mammals are relatively more diverse in morphology.

Phenotypic disparity, also known as morphological diversity, morphological variety, morphological disparity, morphodisparity or simply disparity, refers to the variation of observable characteristics within biological groups. It was originally proposed in paleontology, and has also been introduced into the study of extant organisms. Some biologists view phenotypic disparity as an important aspect of biodiversity, while others believe that they are two different concepts.

== History ==
Biologists' interest in phenotypic disparity predates the formal concept. Douglas Erwin argued that it had been central to the organismal biology since Georges Cuvier, who utilized it as a criterion for animal classification. However, prior to the development of quantitative methods for measuring disparity, the disparity recognized within the Linnaean taxonomy faced criticism for being unnatural.

This concept was first proposed in the 1980s, utilized to explore the evolutionary patterns of variation in anatomy, function, and ecology. It arose from the efforts by paleobiologists to define the evolutionary origins of the body plans of animals and by comparative developmental biologists to offer causal explanations for the emergence of these body plans. In 1989, Stephen Jay Gould published Wonderful Life, in which he used the fossils from the Middle Cambrian Burgess Shale to contend that the ancient arthropods at this site has a greater phenotypic disparity than all living arthropods. This concept has been introduced into the study of extant organisms.

Initially, phenotypic disparity was considered a sub-concept of biodiversity, referred to as "morphological diversity", subsequently it acquired its own name "disparity", also known as "phenotypic disparity", "morphological disparity", "morphological variety" or "morphodisparity".

== Summary ==
In the narrower sense, the currently widely accepted concept of biodiversity meant only the taxonomic diversity, or the species richness. However, some groups have a large number of species, while all of them are very similar in morphology; other groups have very few species, while they are highly heterogeneous. For example, there are nearly twice as many species of birds as there are of mammals, indicating greater species richness, but birds are more consistent in morphology, reproductive biology, and developmental biology. The range of their body plans is relatively narrow, with outliers like ratites (e.g. ostriches) and penguins, while mammals include such diverse forms as apes, armadillos, bats, giraffes, marsupials, moles, the platypus and whales. Therefore, relying only on species richness to represent biodiversity is less comprehensive.

The disparity is defined as the phenotypic differentiation within groups. "Groups" usually refers to the taxonomic groups, including species or higher taxa, and both extant or fossil organisms. Some biologists believe that this concept should also apply to other groups, including sexes, ages, ecomorphs and the castes of social insects.

Disparity has changed at different rates and independently of species richness in the evolutionary history. There are two main patterns in how disparity develops over time. Some groups have developed high disparity early on in their evolution (called "early-disparity"), while others take longer to reach their maximum disparity (called "later-disparity"). The early-disparity boom may happen because species quickly explore new habitats or take advantage of new ecological niches. On the other hand, later-disparity groups may have developed new morphological forms slowly, resulting in a delay in reaching their maximum disparity.

== Measuring disparity ==
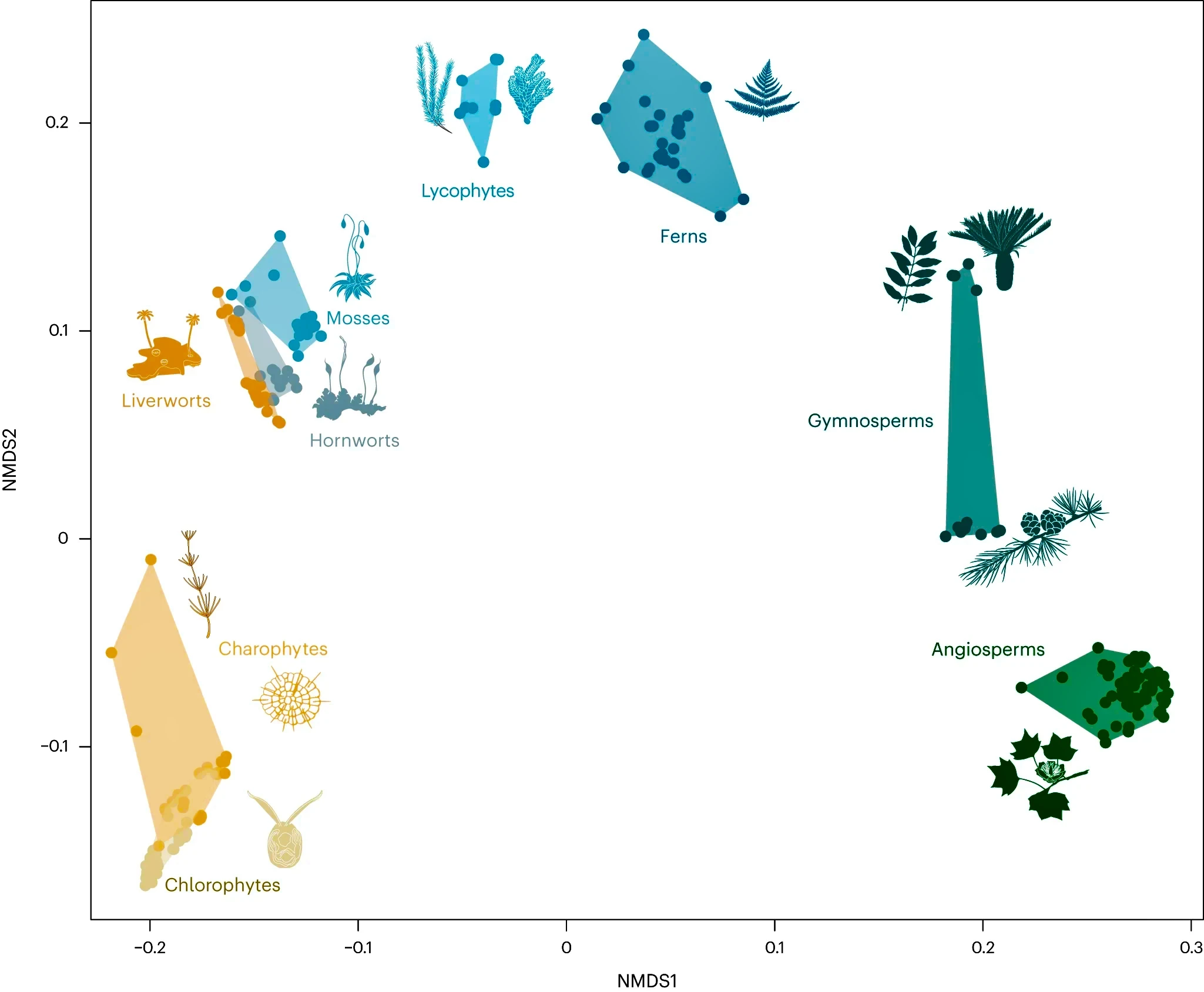
The morphospace of the plant kingdom. Taxa with higher disparity occupy larger areas.

Initially, there was no consensus on how to measure disparity. In the 1980s, taxonomic metrics was an early approach of measuring disparity among groups. It involved counting how many different families or genera there were to measure the diversity and disparity of a taxon. It was based on the assumption that higher-ranked taxa could represent specific morphological innovations. Although this approach was criticized as it relied on artificial and non-monophyletic taxa, it provided valuable insights into the evolution of disparity. Some conclusions have been confirmed by subsequent quantitative metrics.

Currently, disparity is usually quantified using the morphospace, which is a multidimensional space covering the morphological variation within a taxon. Due to the use of different mathematical tools, morphospaces may have different geometric structures and mathematical meanings.

The initial step involves selecting multiple phenotypic descriptors (characteristics described in appropriate ways) that vary among different taxa. All phenotypic characteristics can be used to evaluate the disparity of a group, but the morphological characteristics are mostly used, because they are more accessible than others. Secondly, use the selected descriptors to construct a morphospace. Then, use standard statistical dispersion indicators, such as total range or total variance, to describe the dispersion and distribution of groups in morphospace. The morphospace is a multidimensional space, which is almost impossible to visualize, so the dimensionality of the morphospace should be reduced using principal component analysis, principal coordinate analysis, nonmetric multidimensional scaling, or other mathematical methods. Therefore, it could be projected onto a two-dimensional space to visualize it.
