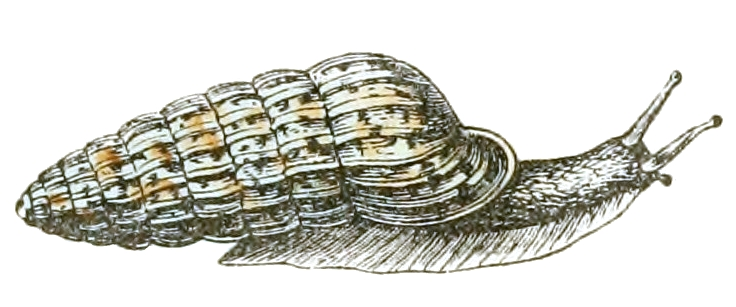
- Cerion chrysalis

Scientific classification
- Kingdom: Animalia
- Phylum: Mollusca
- Class: Gastropoda
- Order: Stylommatophora
- Superfamily: Urocoptoidea
- Family: Cerionidae; Pilsbry, 1901

Diversity
- about 600 nominal species

= Cerionidae =

Family of gastropods

Cerionidae is a family of air-breathing land snails, terrestrial pulmonate gastropod mollusks in the superfamily Urocoptoidea.

== Pre-2008 taxonomy ==
According to the taxonomy of the Gastropoda by Bouchet & Rocroi, 2005), the family Cerionidae is classified in the superfamily Orthalicoidea, within the informal group Sigmurethra, itself belonging to the clade Stylommatophora within the clade Eupulmonata. The family Cerionidae has no subfamilies.

== 2008 taxonomy ==
Uit de Weerd (2008) moved the Cerionidae to the newly established superfamily Urocoptoidea based on molecular phylogeny research.

== Fossil record ==
The oldest fossil cerionid is C. acherontis from the Upper Cretaceous Hell Creek Formation, in Montana, northwestern USA. The second oldest record is the genus Brasilennea from the Brazilian Paleocene Itaboraí Basin, in Rio de Janeiro.

== Genera ==
Genera within the Cerionidae include:

- †Brasilennea Maury, 1935
- Cerion Röding, 1798 - the type genus of the family Cerionidae
- Mexistrophia Thompson, 2011
