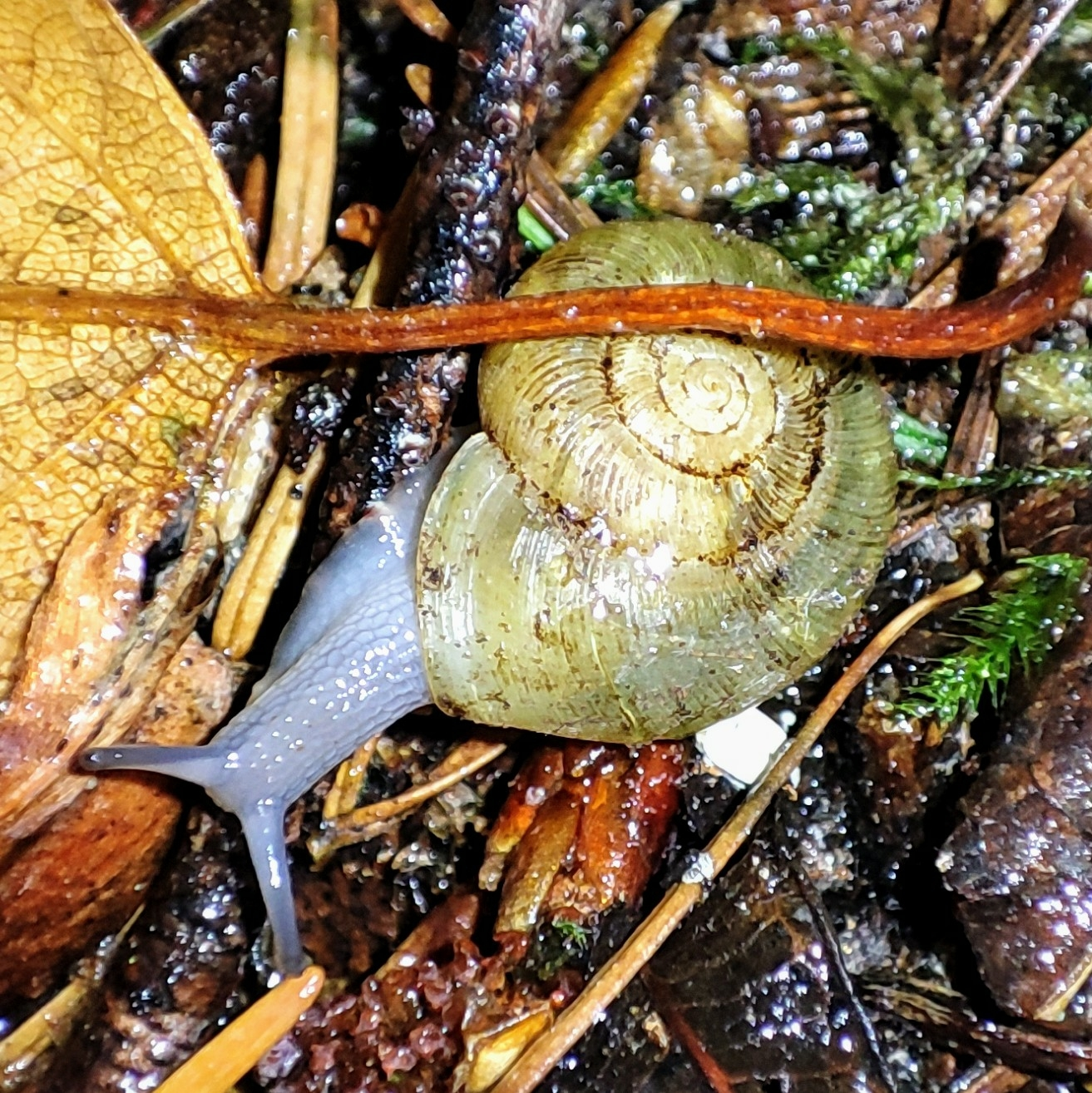
- Ancotrema sportella ssp. sportella

Scientific classification
- Kingdom: Animalia
- Phylum: Mollusca
- Class: Gastropoda
- Order: Stylommatophora
- Family: Haplotrematidae
- Genus: Ancotrema; H. B. Baker, 1931

= Ancotrema =

Genus of gastropods

Ancotrema is a genus of air-breathing land snails, terrestrial pulmonate gastropod mollusks in the family Haplotrematidae.

This genus is sometimes considered to be a subgenus of Haplotrema. Haplotrema and Ancotrema cannot be distinguished only on the basis of their shells, but can be distinguished on the basis of their detailed internal anatomy.

The genus Ancotrema contains the following species:

- Ancotrema hybridum (Ancey, 1888); Oregon lancetooth
- Ancotrema sportella (Gould, 1846); beaded lancetooth
- Ancotrema voyanum (Newcomb, 1865); hooded lancetooth
- Ancotrema zopherum Roth, 1990: dusky lancetooth
