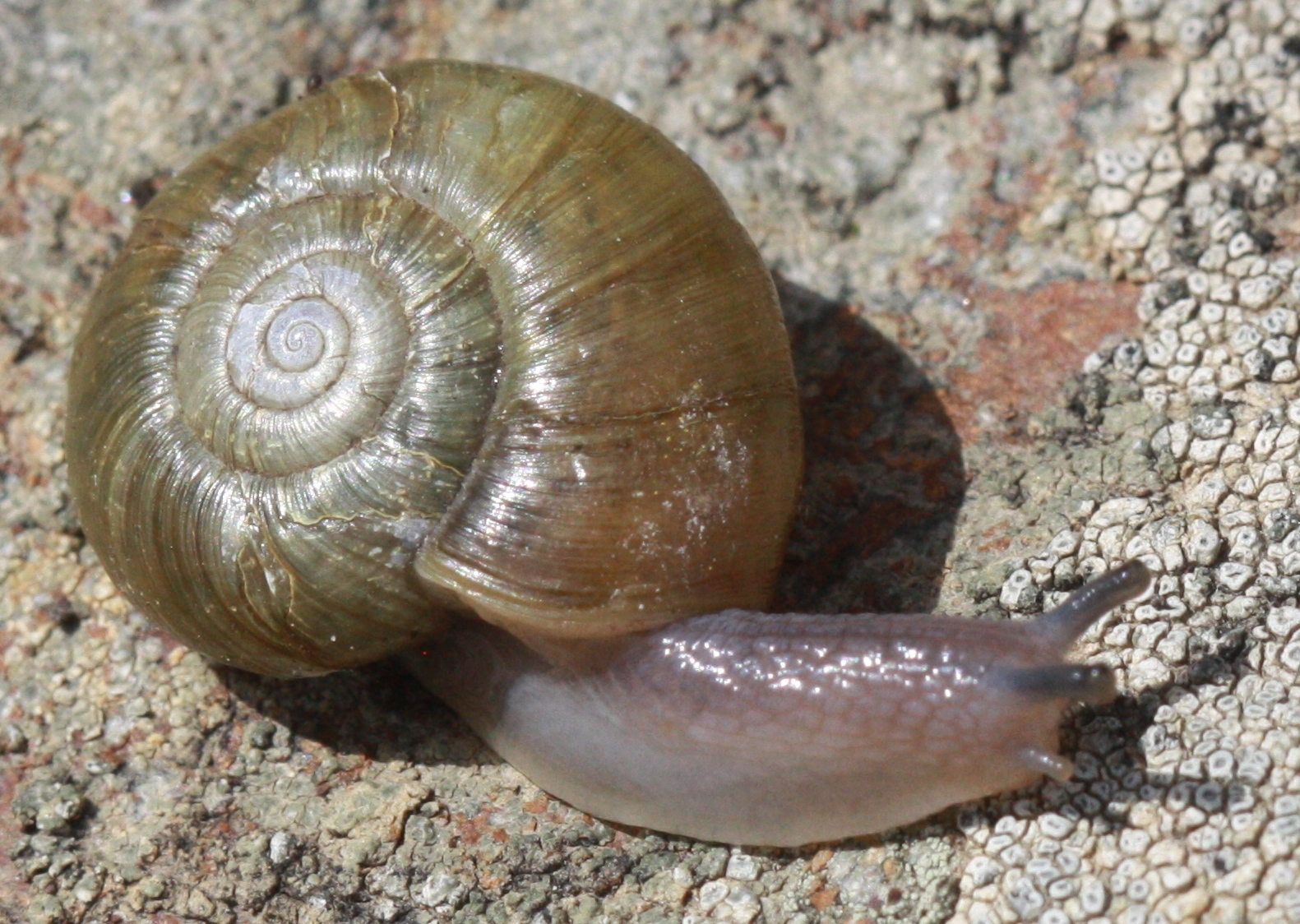

Conservation status
- Critically Imperiled (NatureServe)

Scientific classification
- Kingdom: Animalia
- Phylum: Mollusca
- Class: Gastropoda
- Order: Stylommatophora
- Family: Haplotrematidae
- Genus: Haplotrema
- Species: H. minimum

Binomial name
- Haplotrema minimum (Ancey, 1888)

Synonyms
- Haplotrema (Ancomena) minimum (Ancey, 1888); Selenites concavus var. occidentalis Hemphill, 1892; Selenites vancouverensis var. tenuis Hemphill, 1892; Selenites vellicata var. minima Ancey, 1888

= Haplotrema minimum =

Species of gastropod

Haplotrema minimum, also known as the California lancetooth snail, is a species of predatory air-breathing land snail in the family Haplotrematidae. It is found in California. Haplotrema minimum eats other snails, slugs, and plant material.
