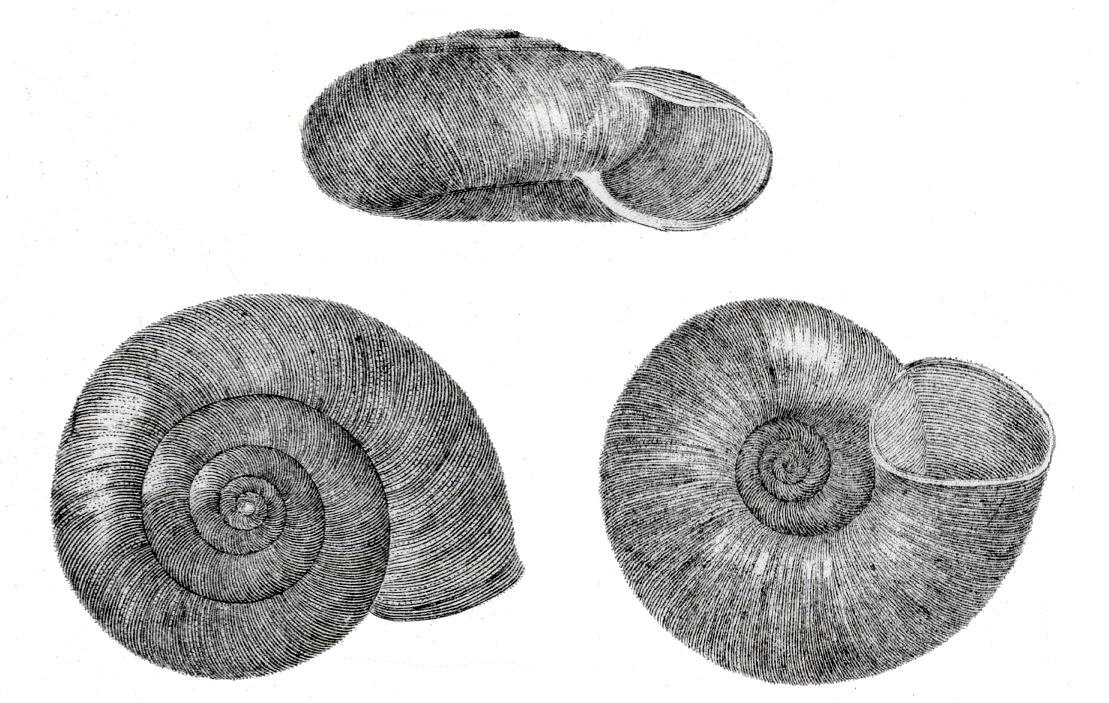
- Haplotrema concavum from W. G. Binney, 1878

Conservation status
- Secure (NatureServe)

Scientific classification
- Kingdom: Animalia
- Phylum: Mollusca
- Class: Gastropoda
- Order: Stylommatophora
- Family: Haplotrematidae
- Genus: Haplotrema
- Species: H. concavum

Binomial name
- Haplotrema concavum (Say, 1821)

= Haplotrema concavum =

Species of gastropod

Haplotrema concavum, the gray-footed lancetooth, is a species of predatory air-breathing land snail, a terrestrial pulmonate gastropod mollusk in the family Haplotrematidae.

== Distribution ==
The snail is native to the humid hardwood forests of eastern North America, from Southern Canada and the Great Lakes region, south through the Midwestern U.S. including eastern Nebraska and Oklahoma, and through the Southeastern United States, including the Gulf States. It is found along the Apalachicola River in western Florida and Georgia.

Haplotrema concavum is found living in leaf litter near the base of trees, or under rotting logs.

== Feeding habits ==
Haplotrema concavum is a carnivorous species. It is known to be a predator, for example, of Patera clarki nantahala.

== Parasites ==
Parasites of Haplotrema concavum include:

- Parelaphostrongylus tenuis
