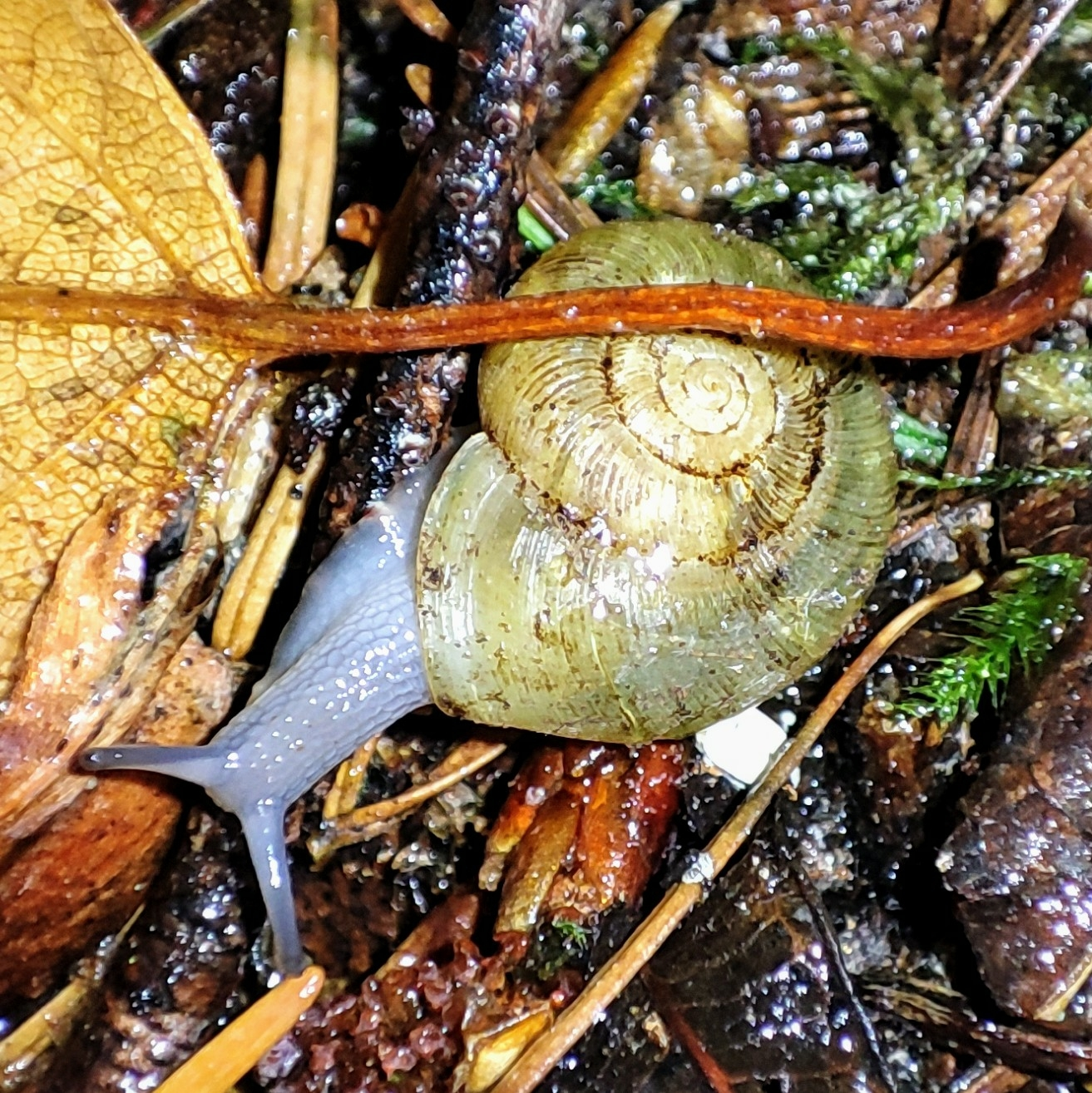
- Ancotrema sportella sportella

Scientific classification
- Kingdom: Animalia
- Phylum: Mollusca
- Class: Gastropoda
- Order: Stylommatophora
- Family: Haplotrematidae
- Genus: Ancotrema
- Species: A. sportella

Binomial name
- Ancotrema sportella (Gould, 1846)

Synonyms
- Ancotrema hybridum

= Ancotrema sportella =

Species of gastropod

Ancotrema sportella, common name the beaded lancetooth, is a species of air-breathing land snail, a terrestrial pulmonate gastropod mollusk in the family Haplotrematidae.
