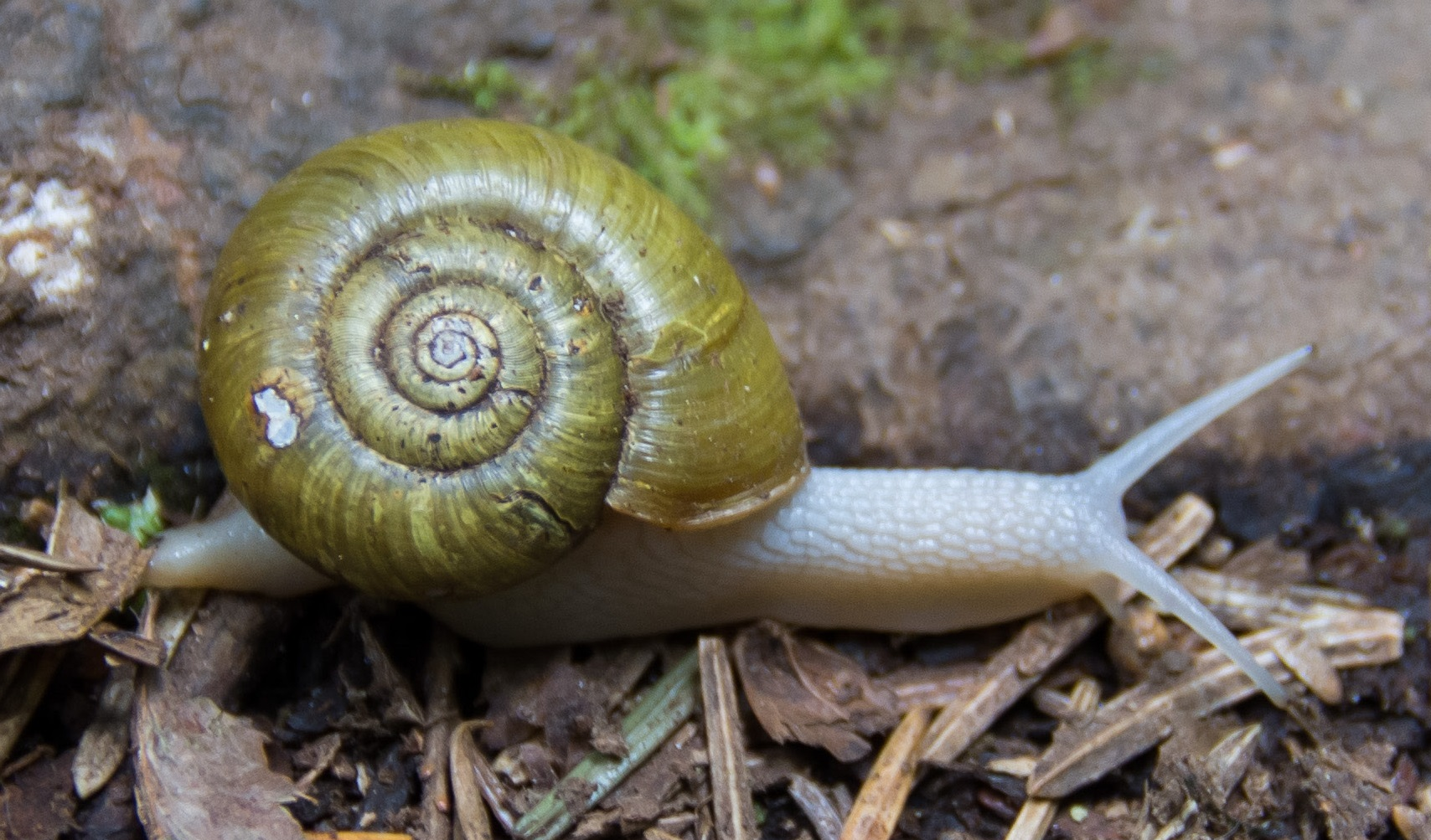

Conservation status
- Secure (NatureServe)

Scientific classification
- Kingdom: Animalia
- Phylum: Mollusca
- Class: Gastropoda
- Order: Stylommatophora
- Family: Haplotrematidae
- Genus: Haplotrema
- Species: H. vancouverense

Binomial name
- Haplotrema vancouverense (I. Lea, 1839)

= Haplotrema vancouverense =

Species of gastropod

Haplotrema vancouverense, common name the robust lancetooth, is a species of predatory air-breathing land snail, a terrestrial pulmonate gastropod mollusk in the family Haplotrematidae.
