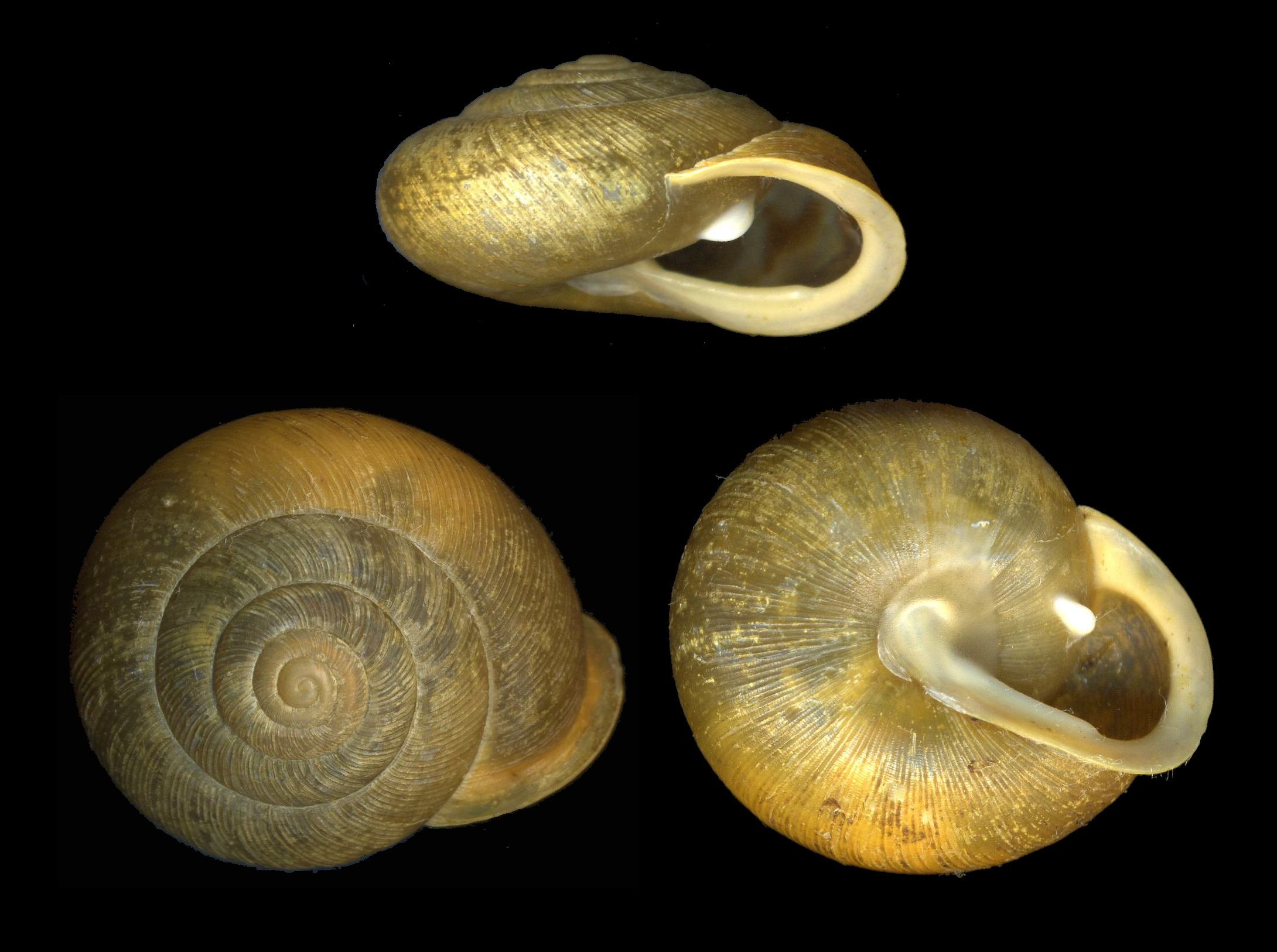
- Three views of a shell of Patera perigraptus

Conservation status
- Secure (NatureServe)

Scientific classification
- Kingdom: Animalia
- Phylum: Mollusca
- Class: Gastropoda
- Order: Stylommatophora
- Family: Polygyridae
- Genus: Patera
- Species: P. perigrapta

Binomial name
- Patera perigrapta (Pilsbry, 1894)

= Patera perigrapta =

Species of gastropod

Patera perigrapta is a species of air-breathing land snail, a terrestrial pulmonate gastropod mollusc in the family Polygyridae.
