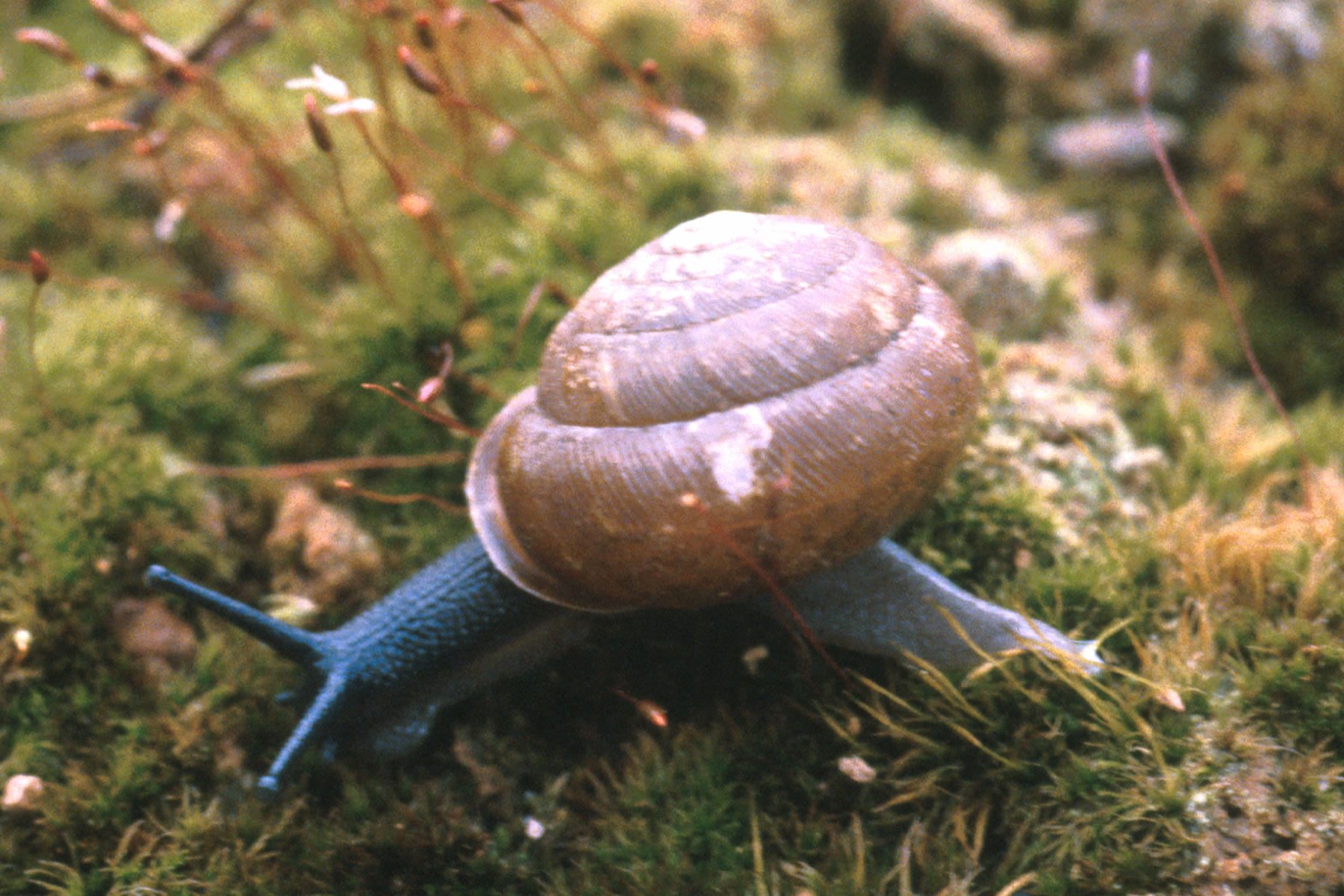
- ssp. nantahala

Conservation status
- Vulnerable (NatureServe)

Scientific classification
- Kingdom: Animalia
- Phylum: Mollusca
- Class: Gastropoda
- Order: Stylommatophora
- Family: Polygyridae
- Genus: Patera
- Species: P. clarki

Binomial name
- Patera clarki (I. Lea, 1858)

Synonyms
- Mesodon clarki

= Patera clarki =

Species of gastropod

Patera clarki, the dwarf proud globe, is a species of land snail in the family Polygyridae. It is native to the southeastern United States, where it occurs in Georgia, North Carolina, South Carolina, and Tennessee. The subspecies nantahala is a federally listed threatened taxon endemic to Swain County, North Carolina.

== Subspecies ==
There are two subspecies:

- Patera clarki clarki (I.Lea, 1858) – dwarf proud globe
- Patera clarki nantahala (Clench & Banks, 1932) – noonday globe
