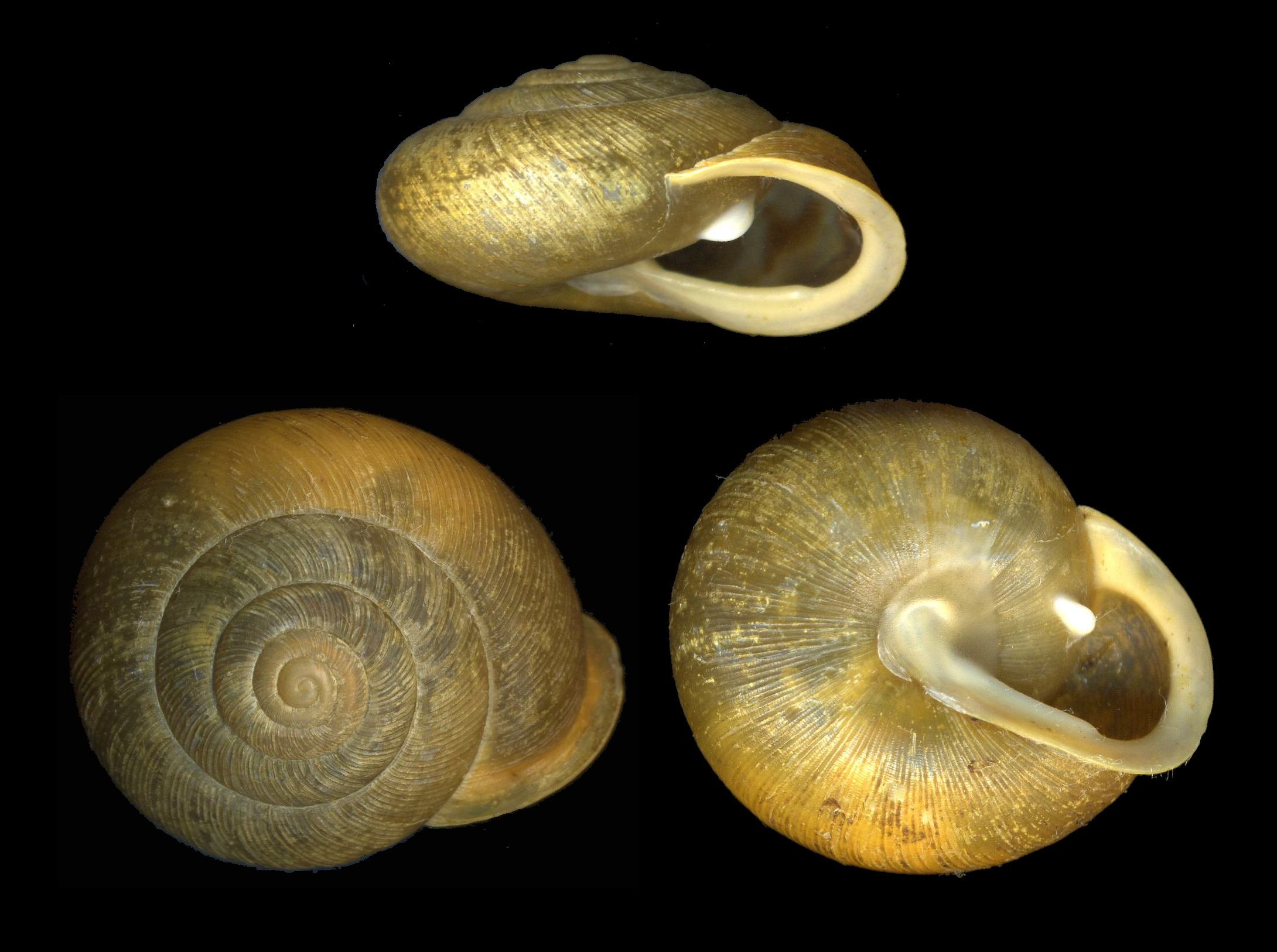
- Patera perigrapta

Scientific classification
- Kingdom: Animalia
- Phylum: Mollusca
- Class: Gastropoda
- Order: Stylommatophora
- Family: Polygyridae
- Subfamily: Triodopsinae
- Tribe: Mesodontini
- Genus: Patera; Albers, 1850

= Patera (gastropod) =

Genus of gastropods

Patera is a genus of land snails in the family Polygyridae.

The name is from the Latin patera ("a saucer"), and refers to the highly depressed, saucer-like shape of the shells of these snails. In addition to flattened shells, members of the group have an imperforate umbilicus and a single tooth on the parietal wall of the aperture.

These snails are known only from the eastern United States.

== Species ==
Species include:

- Patera appressa – flat bladetooth
- Patera binneyana – half-lidded oval
- Patera clarki – dwarf proud globe
  - Patera clarki clarki
  - Patera clarki nantahala – noonday globe
- Patera clenchi – Calico Rock oval, Clench's middle-toothed land snail
- Patera indianorum – lidded oval
- Patera kiowaensis – drywoods oval
- Patera laevior – smooth bladetooth
- Patera leatherwoodi – Pedernales oval
- Patera panselenus – Virginia bladetooth
- Patera pennsylvanica – proud globelet
- Patera perigrapta – engraved bladetooth
- Patera roemeri – Texas oval
- Patera sargentiana – grand bladetooth
