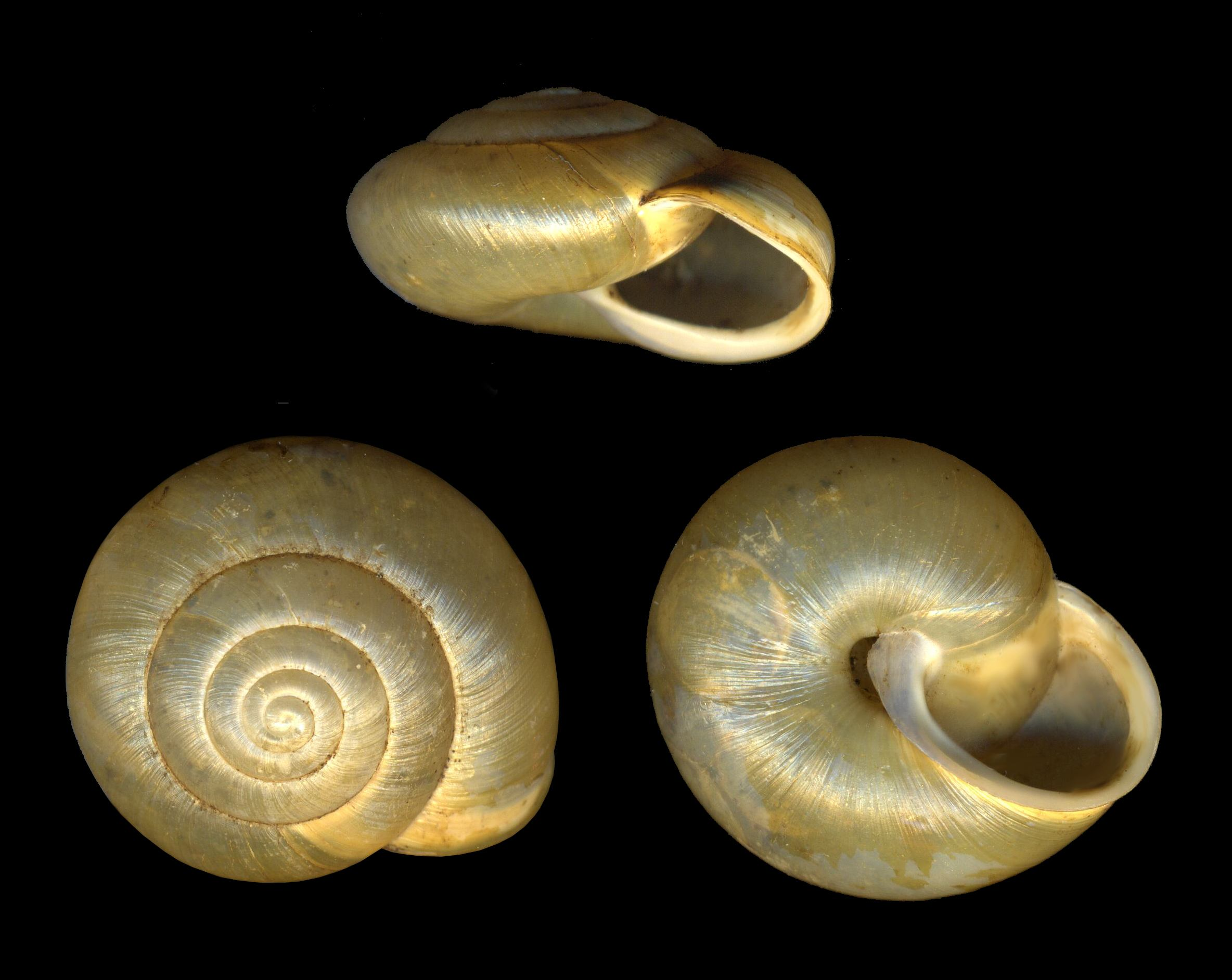

Conservation status
- Endangered (IUCN 2.3)

- Imperiled (NatureServe)

Scientific classification
- Kingdom: Animalia
- Phylum: Mollusca
- Class: Gastropoda
- Order: Stylommatophora
- Family: Polygyridae
- Genus: Patera
- Species: P. clenchi

Binomial name
- Patera clenchi (Rehder, 1932)

Synonyms
- Mesodon clenchi

= Patera clenchi =

Species of gastropod

Patera clenchi (syn. Mesodon clenchi) is a species of land snail in the family Polygyridae. It is endemic to Arkansas in the United States. Its common names include Calico Rock oval, Clench's middle-toothed land snail, and Mission Creek Oregonian.

The snail occurs in leaf litter in rocky cliff and rockslide habitat. It is threatened by habitat disturbance.

The species was named for the American malacologist William J. Clench.
