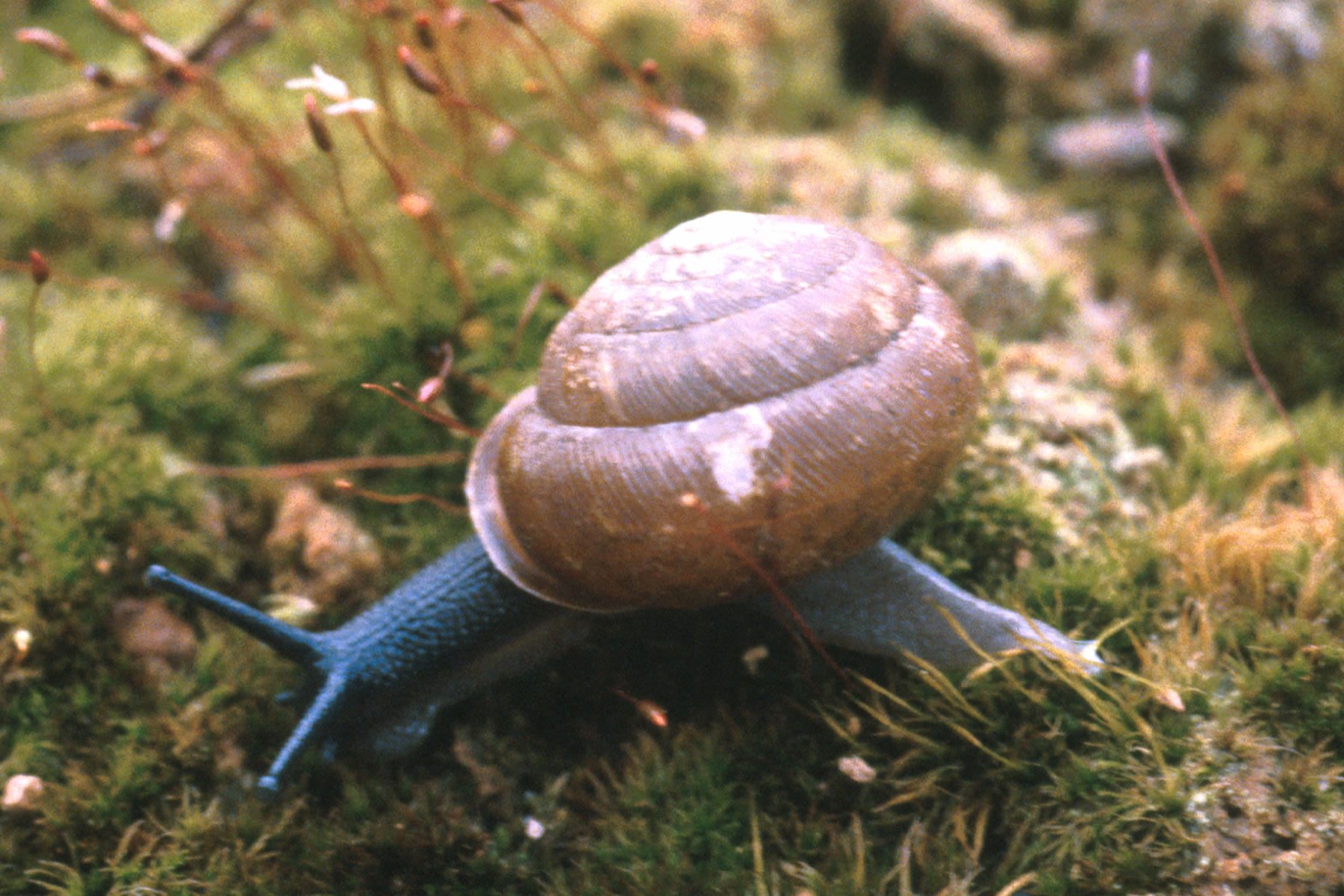

Conservation status
- Threatened (ESA)

Scientific classification
- Domain: Eukaryota
- Kingdom: Animalia
- Phylum: Mollusca
- Class: Gastropoda
- Order: Stylommatophora
- Family: Polygyridae
- Genus: Patera
- Species: P. clarki
- Subspecies: P. c. nantahala

Trinomial name
- Patera clarki nantahala (Clench & Banks, 1932)

Synonyms
- Polygyra (Triodopsis) nantahala Mesodon clarki nantahala

= Patera clarki nantahala =

Subspecies of gastropod

Patera clarki nantahala, the noonday globe, is a subspecies of Patera clarki, a land snail in the family Polygyridae. It is endemic to North Carolina in the United States.

The name nantahala is a Cherokee word which means noonday. This subspecies was given this name because the snail lives in a deep gorge where the sunshine does not reach the ground until the middle of the day.

== Shell description ==
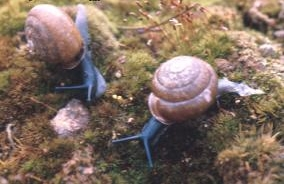
Patera clarki nantahala

The shell of the noonday globe snail is moderately sized (3/4 inch wide and 1/2 inch high) and globose in shape. The outer shell surface is shiny and reddish in color.

Shells of this subspecies often exhibit 5 and half whorls. The shell surface is sculptured with rather coarse lines. The area around the shell opening (aperture) is white, and a long curved "tooth" is located on the inside portion of the aperture.

The width of the shell is 18 mm. The height of the shell is 11 mm.

The body is black.

== Distribution ==
Map of North Carolina with Swain County marked in red

Patera clarki nantahala is endemic to North Carolina, where it is known only from the Nantahala Gorge in Swain County in the Appalachian Mountains. It occurs along about two miles of high cliffs on the eastern side of the gorge.

This subspecies was probably never widely distributed. Its native habitat of steep wet slopes with calcareous rocks is rare in western North Carolina. It probably had a wider range before the gorge underwent the construction of a railroad and U.S. Route 19. Both of these projects altered the forest community along the river. The associated loss of the forest canopy allowed more sunlight to penetrate the gorge, drying the substrate on the lower slopes. This habitat alteration changed the floral and faunal assemblage, allowing non-native plants such as kudzu and Japanese honeysuckle to invade some roadside areas.

In an attempt to secure the snail's continued existence, the United States Fish and Wildlife Service added it as a threatened subspecies, to the Federal Endangered and Threatened Species List on July 3, 1978. It is a Federal offense punishable by as much as a $50,000 fine and one year in jail for taking a noonday snail.

== Ecology ==
Because this snail is so rare and restricted in distribution, very little is known of its biology.

=== Habitat ===
This land snail is found in damp oak-hickory forest.

The cliffs in the Nantahala Gorge region are very wet, intersected by many small streams and waterfalls. The forest is mature, with many large trees and a diverse plant community. The forest floor has a thick, rich humus layer, and the area has many exposed limestone rocks. Calcium carbonate, which is generally scarce in other cliffs in the area, is vital to most snails, because it is a major component of their shells. The rich, moist calcareous soils, and the mature forest community are likely to account for the unusually wide variety of snails which inhabit the area; Patera clarki nantahala being found in association with 29 other snail species.

This subspecies appears to be most active during wet weather, when it is frequently found out on the surface of vegetation, rather than under the leaf litter on the forest floor.

=== Feeding habits ===
The feeding habits of P. clarki are unknown, but other related species in the genus Patera feed on fungi, in particular the subsurface, hair-like mycelia.

=== Life cycle ===
This subspecies' reproductive behavior is currently unknown.

=== Interspecific relationships ===
Snails are usually exploited as a food source by other animals. A common carnivorous land snail, Haplotrema concavum, was observed eating a noonday globe snail, and gnawed shells of the other subspecies of this snail, Patera clarki clarki, have been found in the dens of small rodents.
