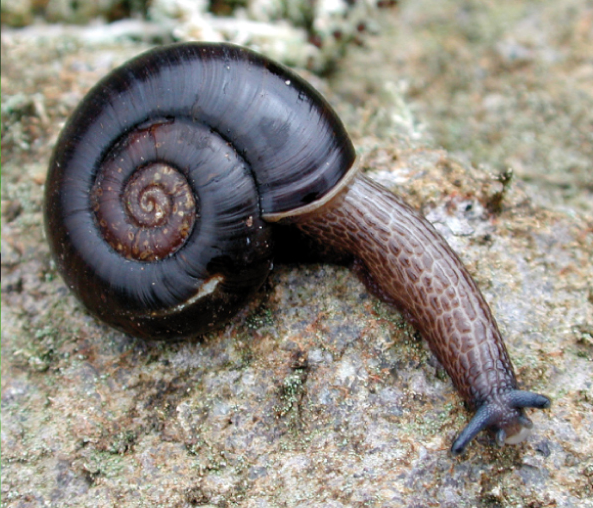
- Zophos cf. baudoni from Dominica.

Scientific classification
- Kingdom: Animalia
- Phylum: Mollusca
- Class: Gastropoda
- Order: Stylommatophora
- Family: Haplotrematidae
- Genus: Zophos; Gude, 1911

Synonyms
- Baudonia; Mörchia; Selenites

= Zophos =

Genus of gastropods

Zophos is a genus of air-breathing land snails, terrestrial pulmonate gastropod mollusks in the family Haplotrematidae.

== Species ==
Species within the genus Zophos include:

- Zophos baudoni (Petit, 1853)
- Zophos concolor Férussac
