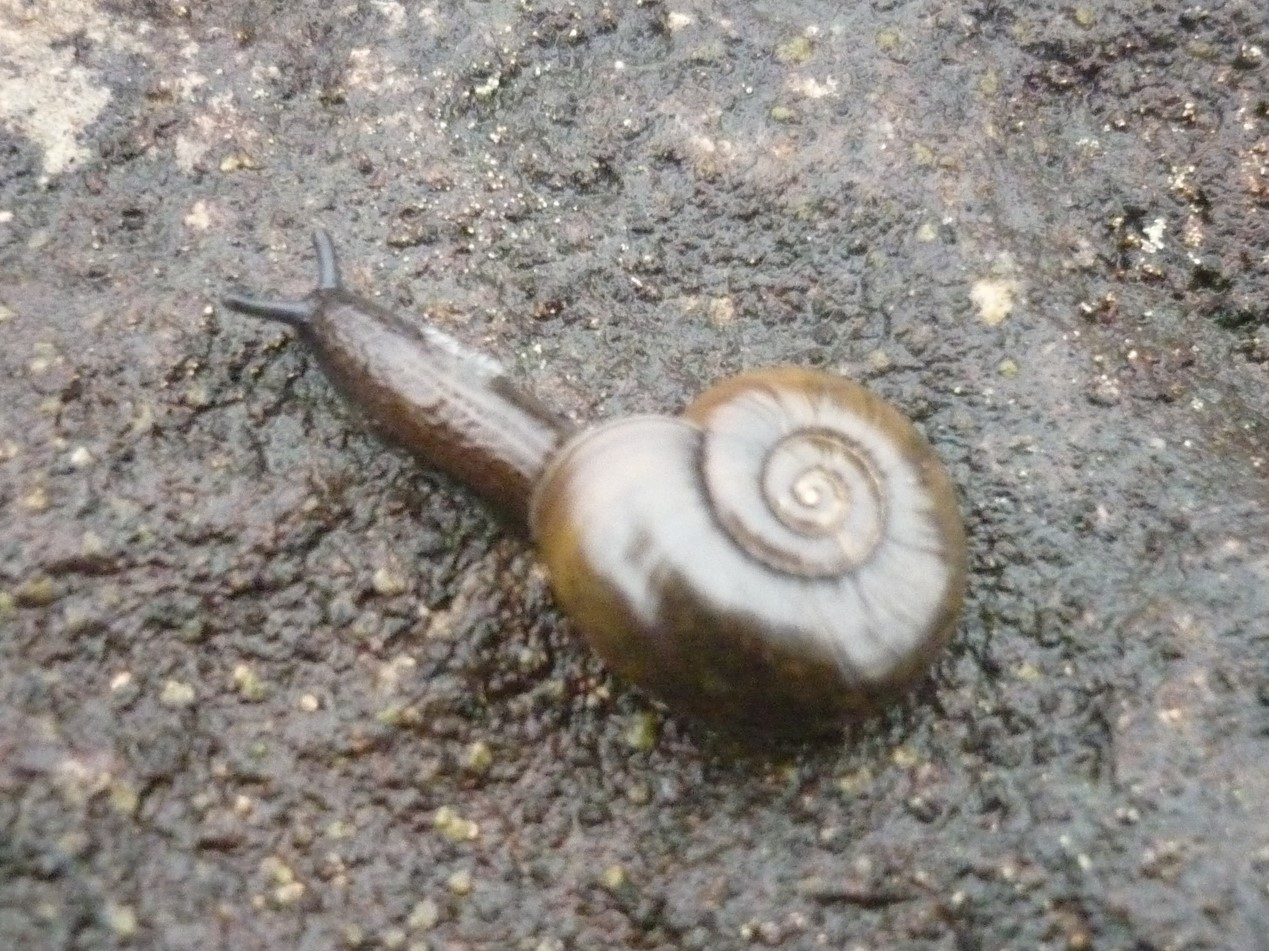

Scientific classification
- Kingdom: Animalia
- Phylum: Mollusca
- Class: Gastropoda
- Order: Stylommatophora
- Family: Haplotrematidae
- Genus: Zophos
- Species: Z. baudoni

Binomial name
- Zophos baudoni (Petit, 1853)

Synonyms
- Hyalina baudoni

= Zophos baudoni =

Species of gastropod

Zophos baudoni is a species of air-breathing land snail, terrestrial pulmonate gastropod mollusk in the family Haplotrematidae.

== Distribution ==
- Guadeloupe - Zophos baudoni was described by Petit de la Saussaye from Guadeloupe.
- Dominica - Robert John Lechmere Guppy (1868) expressed some doubts whether the Dominican specimens belonged to species Zophos baudoni. Ramnath & Fields (2002) were of the same opinion, considering it possibly new to science.

== Ecology ==
Zophos baudoni lives on the rainforest floor.

It is carnivorous and it feeds on earthworms and immature Pleurodonte specimens.
