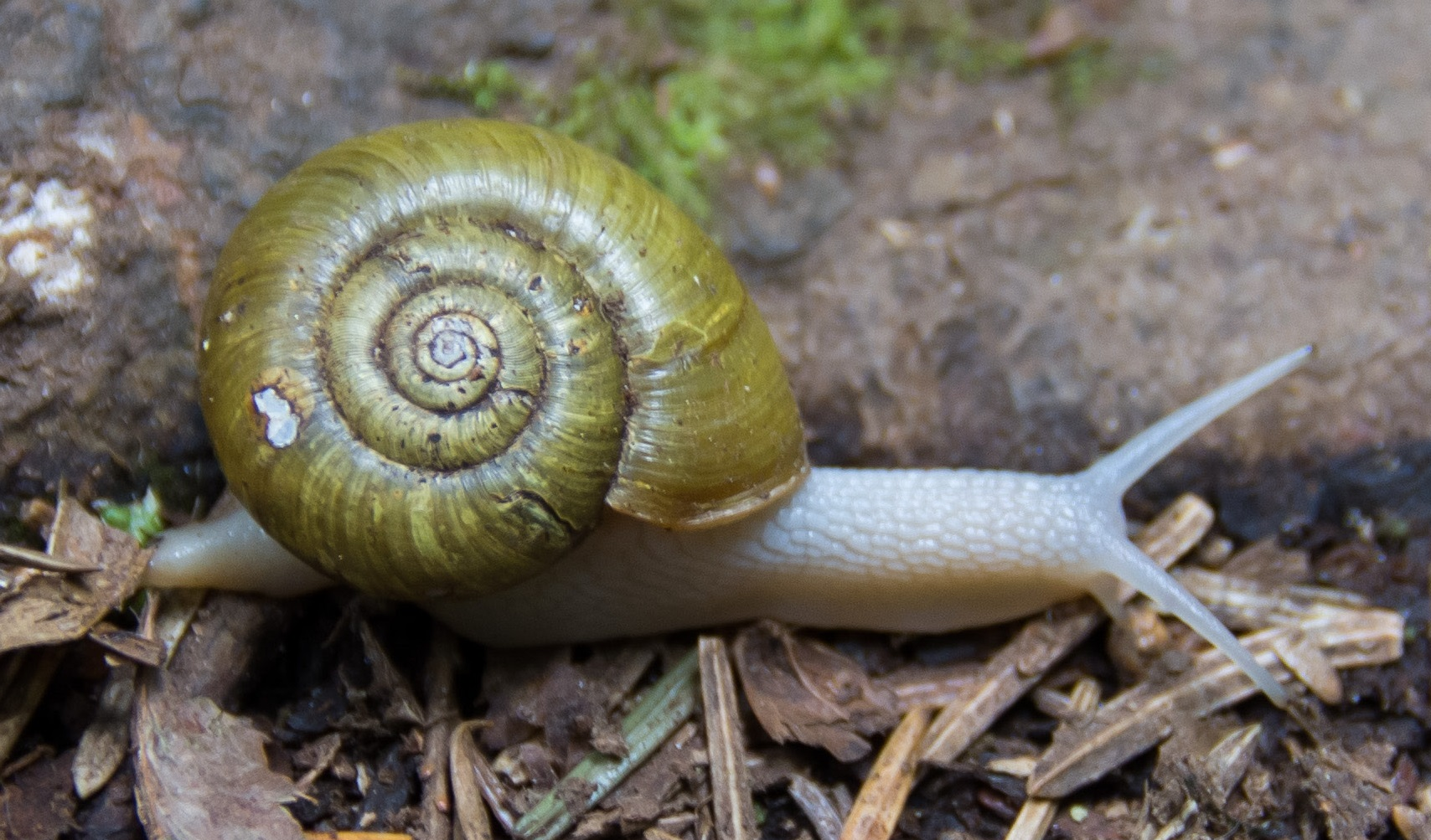
- Haplotrema vancouverense

Scientific classification
- Domain: Eukaryota
- Kingdom: Animalia
- Phylum: Mollusca
- Class: Gastropoda
- Order: Stylommatophora
- Family: Haplotrematidae
- Genus: Haplotrema; Ancey, 1881

= Haplotrema =

Genus of gastropods

Haplotrema is a genus of carnivorous land snails in the family Haplotrematidae. They are widely distributed in North America.

== Species ==
Species include:

- Haplotrema alameda Pilsbry, 1930 – Alameda lancetooth
- Haplotrema caelatum (Mazyck, 1886) – slotted lancetooth
- Haplotrema catalinense (Hemphill, 1890) – Catalina lancetooth
- Haplotrema concavum (Say, 1821) – gray-footed lancetooth
- Haplotrema continentis H.B.Baker, 1930 – grizzly lancetooth
- Haplotrema costatum A.G.Smith, 1957 – costate lancetooth
- Haplotrema duranti (Newcomb, 1864) – ribbed lancetooth
- Haplotrema keepi (Hemphill, 1890) – glassy lancetooth
- Haplotrema kendeighi Webb, 1951 – blue-footed lancetooth
- Haplotrema minimum (Ancey, 1888) – California lancetooth
- Haplotrema mokelumnense Roth, 1990 – Mokelumne lancetooth
- Haplotrema sportella (Gould, 1846) – beaded lancetooth
- Haplotrema transfuga (Hemphill, 1892) – striate lancetooth
- Haplotrema vancouverense (I. Lea, 1839) – robust lancetooth
- Haplotrema voyanum (Newcomb, 1864) – hooded lancetooth
