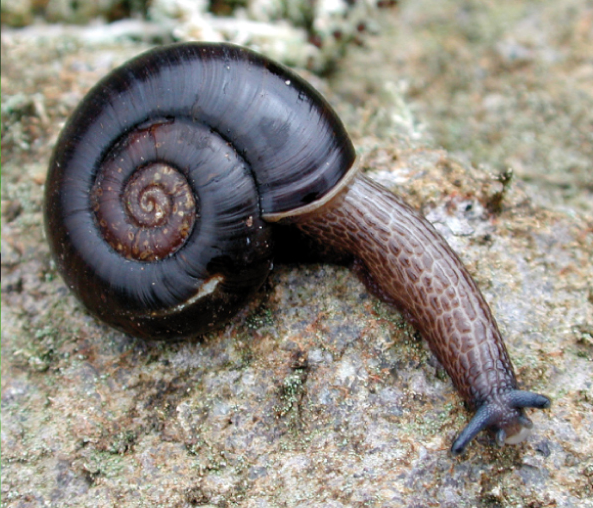
- Zophos cf. baudoni from Dominica

Scientific classification
- Kingdom: Animalia
- Phylum: Mollusca
- Class: Gastropoda
- Order: Stylommatophora
- Superfamily: Haplotrematoidea
- Family: Haplotrematidae; H. B. Baker, 1931

Genera
- See text

= Haplotrematidae =

Family of gastropods

Haplotrematidae is a taxonomic family of predatory air-breathing land snails, terrestrial pulmonate gastropod mollusks in the superfamily Haplotrematoidea.

== Distribution ==
These are North American land snails. They occur from Alaska, through British Columbia, and as far south as northern Mexico, but they are predominantly snails of the eastern and western United States.

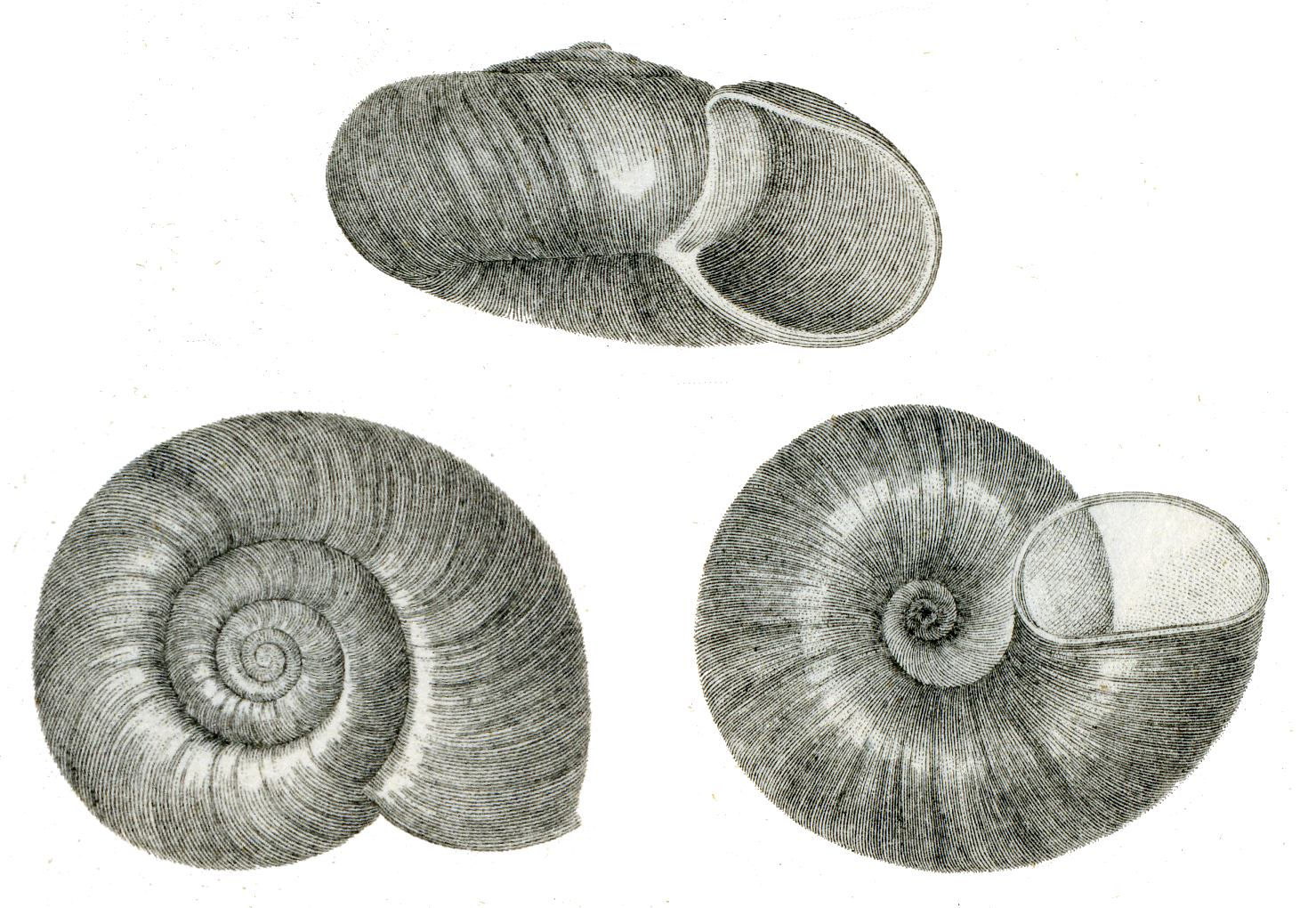
Three views of a shell of Haplotrema vancouverense from W. G. Binney

== Shell description ==
Their shells vary in size from small (7 mm in diameter, or about 0.3 inches) to medium (32 mm, about 1.3 inches), usually with a low, flattened spire, a very wide umbilicus, and usually with the upper lip margin (at the aperture) curving downwards or straightened.

== Anatomy ==
They have a number of anatomical peculiarities.

The structure of the radula of these snails (their "teeth") is unusual. Essentially, haplotrematids have fewer cusps than most snails, but they are considerably elongated, suitable for the predatory life they follow. Members of this family have been given the common name "lancetooth" snails, presumably based on this last anatomical characteristic. Their sole food source consists, as far as is known, of other terrestrial mollusks.

In this family, the number of haploid chromosomes lies between 26 and 30 (according to the values in this table).

== Genera ==
Genera within the family Haplotrematidae include:

Subfamily Austroselenitinae H. B. Baker, 1941

- Austroselenites Kobelt, 1905
- Zophos Gude, 1911

Subfamily Haplotrematinae H. B. Baker, 1925

- Ancomena H. B. Baker, 1931
- Ancotrema H. B. Baker, 1931
- Greggiella H. B. Baker, 1941
- Haplotrema Ancey, 1881

Synonyms

- Moerchia E. von Martens, 1860: synonym of Zophos Gude, 1911 (invalid: junior homonym of Moerchia A. Adams, 1860 [published earlier])
- Selenites P. Fischer, 1878: synonym of Zophos Gude, 1911
- Proselenites Thiele, 1927: synonym of Haplotrema (Geomene) Pilsbry, 1927 represented as Haplotrema Ancey, 1881
