= List of non-marine molluscs of Sri Lanka =

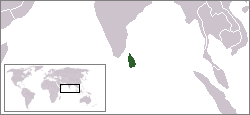
Location of Sri Lanka

The non-marine molluscs of Sri Lanka are a part of the molluscan wildlife of Sri Lanka.

Naggs et al. (2003) listed 246 land gastropods for Sri Lanka. Ranawana (2006) listed 18 species of non-indigenous land gastropods in Sri Lanka and he added some species to that list.

The fauna of Sri Lanka also includes freshwater snails and freshwater bivalves.

== Land Snails ==
Phylum: Mollusca
Class: Gastropoda
When considering mollusc diversity in Sri Lanka, snails are the major group that can be found within the island. About 246 land snails are known to occur in Sri Lanka, with 83% of endemism. This include 5 endemic and relict land snails. Majority of land snails are pulmonates.

Endemic species are highlighted with an asterisk (*).

=== Family: Acavidae ===
- Acavus haemastoma*
- Acavus phoenix*
- Acavus superbus*
- Oligospira polei*
- Oligospira skinneri*
- Oligospira waltoni*

=== Family: Achatinidae - Giant land snails ===
- Achatina fulica

=== Family: Ariophantidae ===
- Cryptozona bistrialis
- Cryptozona ceraria*
- Cryptozona chenui*
- Cryptozona Juliana*
- Cryptozona novella*
- Cryptozona semirugata
- Euplecta acuducta
- Euplecta albnonata
- Euplecta binoyaensis*
- Euplecta colletti*
- Euplecta concavospira*
- Euplectu emiliana*
- Euplecta gardeneri*
- Euplecta hyphasma*
- Euplecta indica
- Euplecta isabellina*
- Euplecta laevis*
- Euplecta lankaensis*
- Euplecta layardi*
- Euplecta neglecta*
- Euplecta partita*
- Euplecta phidias*
- Euplecta prestoni*
- Euplecta rosamonda*
- Euplecta scobinoides*
- Euplecta semidecussata
- Euplecta subopaca*
- Euplecta trimeni*
- Euplecta turritella
- Euplecta travancoricii = Euplecta praeeminens
- Euplecta verrucula*
- Macrochlamys mdica
- Macrochlamys kandiensis*
- Macrochlamys neaps*
- Macrochlamys perfucata*
- Macrochlamys tratanensis*
- Macrachlmys umbrina*
- Macrachlmy vilipensa
- Macrochlamys woodiana
- Microcystina bintennensis*
- Microcystina lita*
- Mariaella dussumieri
- Ratnadvipia irradians*
- Ratnadvipia karui*
- Ravana politissima*
- Sitala operiens*
- Sitala phyll.ophila*
- Sitala pyramidalis*
- Satiella membranacea*

=== Family: Bradybaenidae ===
- Bradybaena similaris

Succineidae

- Succinea ceylanica

=== Family: Enidae ===
- Mirus panos*
- Mirus proletaria*
- Mirus stalix*

=== Family: Camaenidae ===
- Beddomea albizonatus*
- Beddomea ceylanicus*
- Beddomea intermedius*
- Beddomea frifasciatus*
- Trachia fallaciosa
- Trachia vittata
- Landouria radleyi*

=== Family: Cerastidae ===
- Rachis punctatus
- Rhachistia adumhratus*
- Rhachistia pulcher

=== Family: Charopidae ===
- Ruthvenia biciliata*
- Ruthvenia caliginosa*
- Ruthvenia clathratula*
- Thysanota elegans*
- Thysanota eumita*
- Thysanota hispida*

=== Family: Clausiliidae - Door snails ===
- Phaedusa ceylanica*

=== Family: Corillidae ===
- Corilla adamsi*
- Corilla beddomeae *
- Corilla carabmata*
- Corilla colletti*
- Corilla erronea*
- Corilla fryae*
- Corilla giidei*
- Corilla humberti*
- Corilla lesleyae*
- Corilla odontophora*

=== Family: Diplommatinidae ===
- Nicida catathymia*
- Nicida ceylamca*
- Nicida delectabilis*
- Nicida lankaensis*
- Nicida pedronis*
- Nicida prestomi*

=== Family: Endodontidae ===
- Philalanka circumsculpta*
- Philalanka depressa*
- Philalanka edithae*
- Philalanka lamcabensis*
- Philalanka liratula*
- Philalanka mononema*
- Philalanka secessa*
- Philalanka sinhila*
- Philalanka thwaitesi*
- Philalanka trifilosa*

=== Family: Euconulidae - Hive snails ===
- Eurychlamys layardi*
- Eurychlamys regulala*
- Eurychltiniys winifredae*

=== Family: Spiraxidae ===
- Spiraxis cingalensis*

=== Family: Gastrodontidae ===
- Zonitoides arboreus

=== Family: Glessulidae ===
- Glessula capillacea
- Glessula ceylanica*
- Glessula collettae*
- Glessula deshayesi
- Glessula fulgens*
- Glessula inornata*
- Glessula lankana*
- Glessula layardi*
- Glessula nitens*
- Glessula pachycheila*
- Glessula pullens*
- Glessula panaethu*
- Glessula pwahilis*
- Glessula prestoni*
- Glessula punctogallana*
- Glessula pusilla
- Glessula reynelli*
- Glessula sattaraensis
- Glessula serena*
- Glessula simony*
- Glessula sinhila*
- Glessula veruina*

=== Family: Helicarionidae ===
- Kaliella barrakporensis
- Kaliella colletti*
- Kaliella delectabilis*
- Kaliella leithiana*
- Kaliella salicensis*
- Sivella galerus*
- Sivella hyptiucyclos*

=== Family: Agriolimacidae - Keelback slugs ===
- Deroceras reticulatum

=== Family: Planorbidae - Ramshorn snails ===
- Indoplanorbis exustus

=== Family: Pupillidae ===
- Microstele muscerda
- Pupoides coenopictus

=== Family: Pupinidae ===
- Tortulosa aurea*
- Tortulosa austeniana*
- Tortulosa barnaclei*
- Tortulosa blanfordi*
- Tortulosa colletti*
- Tortulosa congener*
- Tortulosa connectens*
- Tortulosa cumingi*
- Tortulosa decora*
- Tortulosa duplicate*
- Tortulosa eurytrema*
- Tortulosa greeni*
- Tortulosa haemastoma*
- Tortulosa hartleyi*
- Tortulosa layardi*
- Tortulosa leucocheilus*
- Tortulosa marginata*
- Tortulosa nevilli*
- Tortulosa metneri*
- Tortulosa prestoni*
- Tortulosa pyramidata*
- Tortulosa rugosa*
- Tortulosa smithi*
- Tortulosa sykesi*
- Tortulosa templemani*
- Tortulosa thwaitesi*

=== Family: Pyramidulidae ===
- Pyramidula halyi*

=== Family: Streptaxidae ===
- Indoartemon cingalensis*
- Indoartemon gracilis*
- Indoartemon layardianus*
- Perrottetia peroteti
- Perrottetia ravanae*
- Gulella bicolor
- Sinoennea planguncula

=== Family: Subulinidae ===
- Subulina octona
- Allopeas gracile
- Allopeas layardi*
- Allopeas marine*
- Allopeas prestoni*
- Allopeas pussilus
- Allopeas sykesi
- Paropeas achatinaceum
- Zootecus insularis

=== Family: Cyclophoridae ===
- Cyclophorus alabastrimis*
- Cyclophorus ceylanicus**
- Cyclophorus involvulus
- Cyclophorus menkeanus
- Aulopoma grande**
- Aulopoma helicinum**
- Aulopoma itieri**
- Aulopoma sphaeroideum**
- Cyathopoma album
- Cyathopoma artatum**
- Cyathopoma ceylanicum**
- Cyathopoma colletti**
- Cyathopoma conoideum**
- Cyathopoma innocens**
- Cyathopoma leptomita*
- Cyathopoma mariae*
- Cyathopoma ogdenianum*
- Cyathopoma perconoideum*
- Cyathopoma prestoni*
- Cyathopoma serendibense*
- Cyathopoma turbinatum*
- Cyathopoma uvaense*
- Japonia binoyae*
- Japonia occulta*
- Japonia vesca*
- Leptopoma apicatum*
- Leptopoma elatum*
- Leptopoma semiclausum*
- Leptopomoides conulus*
- Leptopomoides flammeus*
- Leptopomoides halophilus*
- Leptopomoides orophilus*
- Leptopomoides poecilus*
- Leptopomoides taprobanensis*
- Micraulax coeloconus
- Scabrina brounae (Sykes, 1898)
- Scabrina liratula (Preston, 1909)
- Theobaldius annulatus*
- Theobaldius bairdi*
- Theobaldius cadiscus*
- Theobaldius cratera*
- Theobaldius cytopoma*
- Theobaldius layardi*
- Theobaldius liliputianus*
- Theobaldius loxostoma*
- Theobaldius parapsis*
- Theobaldius parma*
- Theobaldius subplicatulus*
- Theobaldius thwaitesi*
- Pterocyclus bifrons*
- Pterocyclus bilabialus
- Pterocyclus cingalensis*
- Pterocyclus cumingi
- Pterocyclus troscheli*

==== Family: Vertiginidae - Whorl snails ====
- Gastrocopta mimula*
- Nesopupa cinghalensis*
- Pupisoma longstaffae*
- Pupisoma miccyla*

==== Family: Viviparidae - River snails ====
- Bellamya bengalensis
- Bellamya dissimilis

=== Family: Truncatellidae - Looping snails ===
- Truncatella ceylanica

=== Family: Thiaridae - Trumpet snails ===
- Thiara lineata

== See also ==
- List of marine molluscs of Sri Lanka
- List of non-marine molluscs of India
