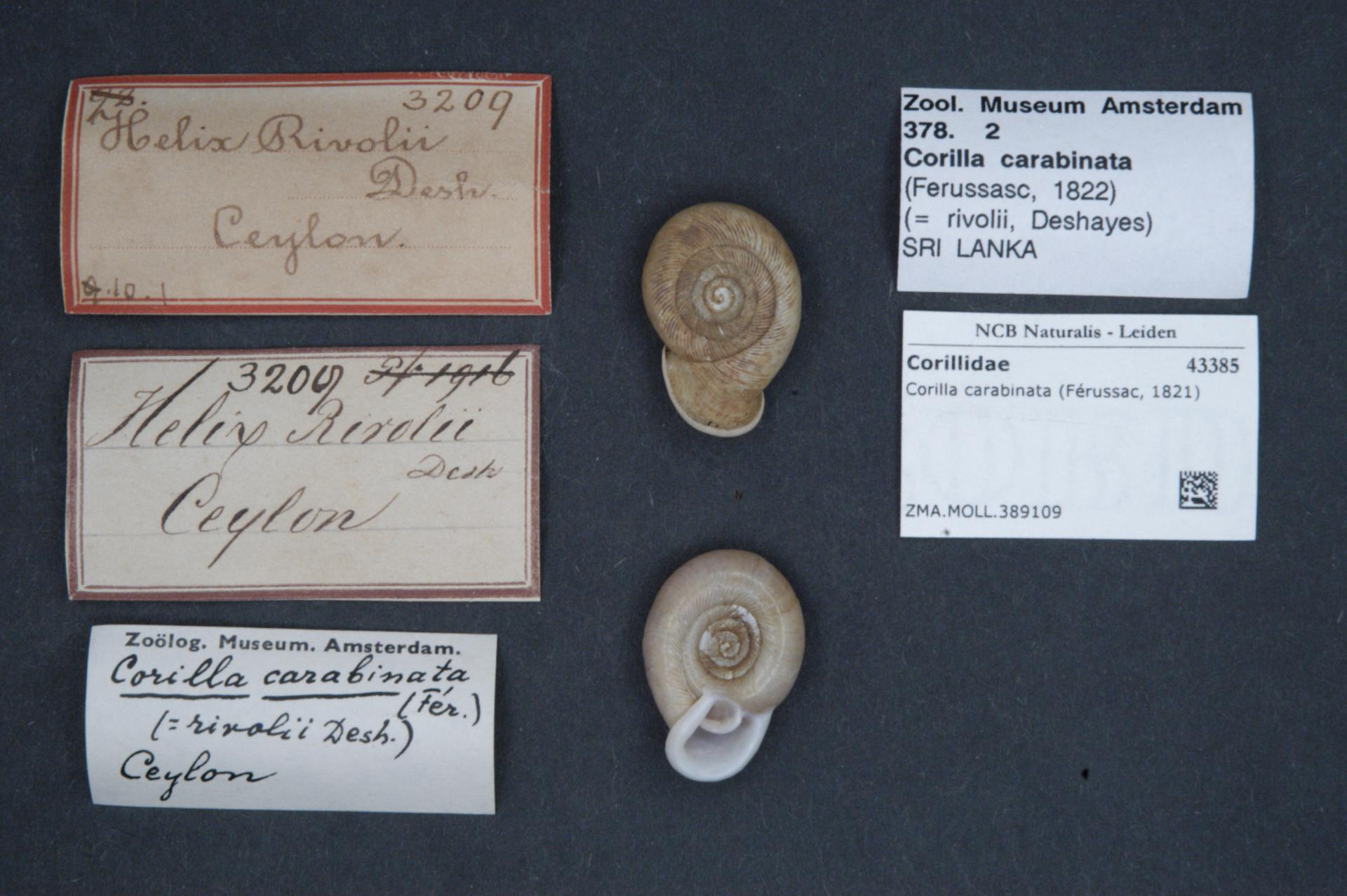
- Corilla carabinata shells

Scientific classification
- Kingdom: Animalia
- Phylum: Mollusca
- Class: Gastropoda
- Order: Stylommatophora
- Family: Corillidae
- Genus: Corilla
- Species: C. carabinata

Binomial name
- Corilla carabinata (Férussac, 1821)

Synonyms

= Corilla carabinata =

Species of gastropod

Corilla carabinata is a species of air-breathing land snail, a terrestrial pulmonate gastropod mollusk in the family Corillidae.

== Distribution ==
Distribution of Corilla carabinata includes Sri Lanka.
