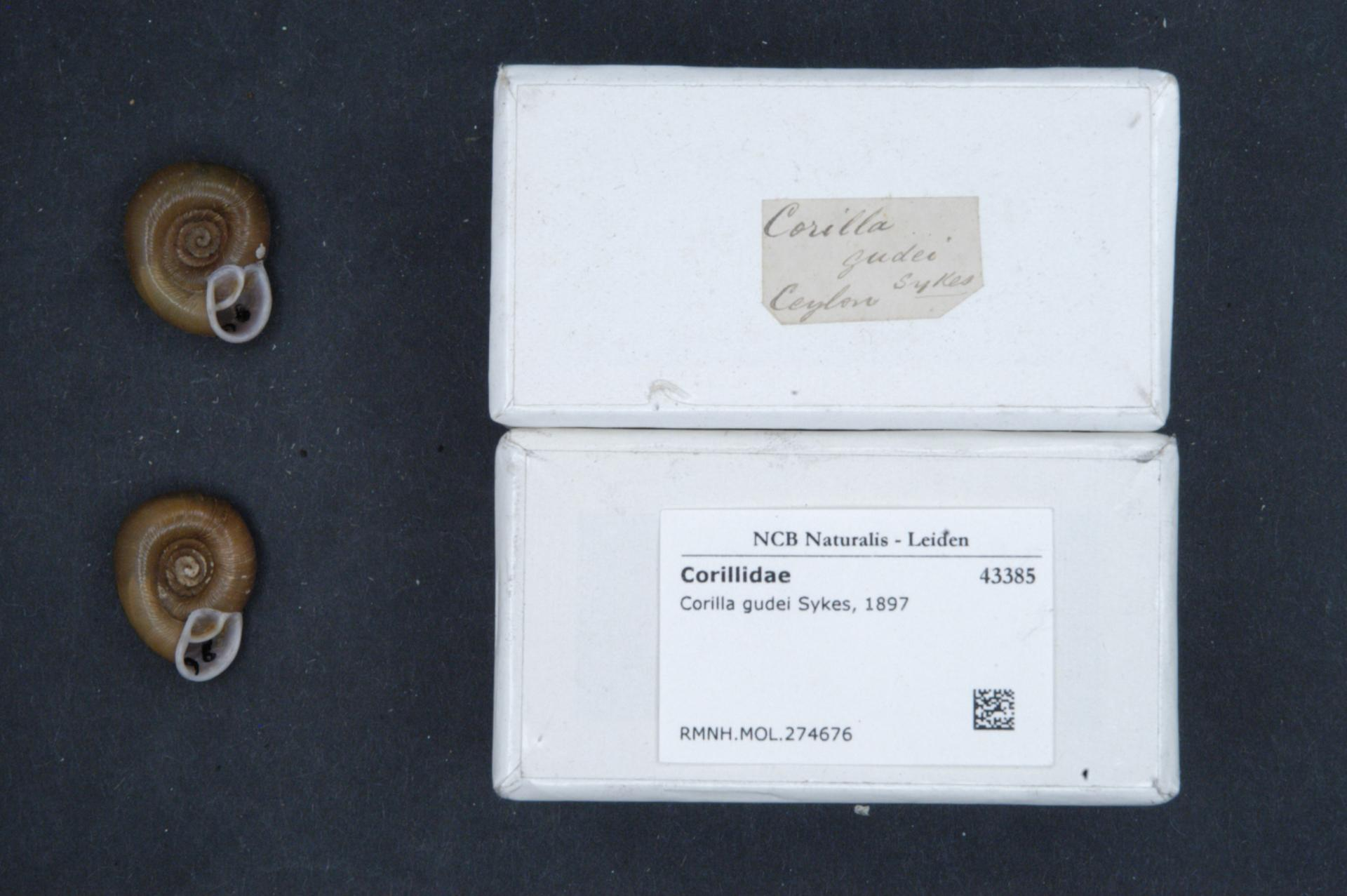
- Corilla gudei shells

Scientific classification
- Kingdom: Animalia
- Phylum: Mollusca
- Class: Gastropoda
- Order: Stylommatophora
- Family: Corillidae
- Genus: Corilla
- Species: C. gudei

Binomial name
- Corilla gudei Sykes, 1897

= Corilla gudei =

Species of gastropod

Corilla gudei is a species of air-breathing land snail, a terrestrial pulmonate gastropod mollusk in the family Corillidae.

The specific name gudei is in honour of malacologist Gerard Pierre Laurent Kalshoven Gude.

== Distribution ==
Distribution of Corilla gudei includes Sri Lanka.
