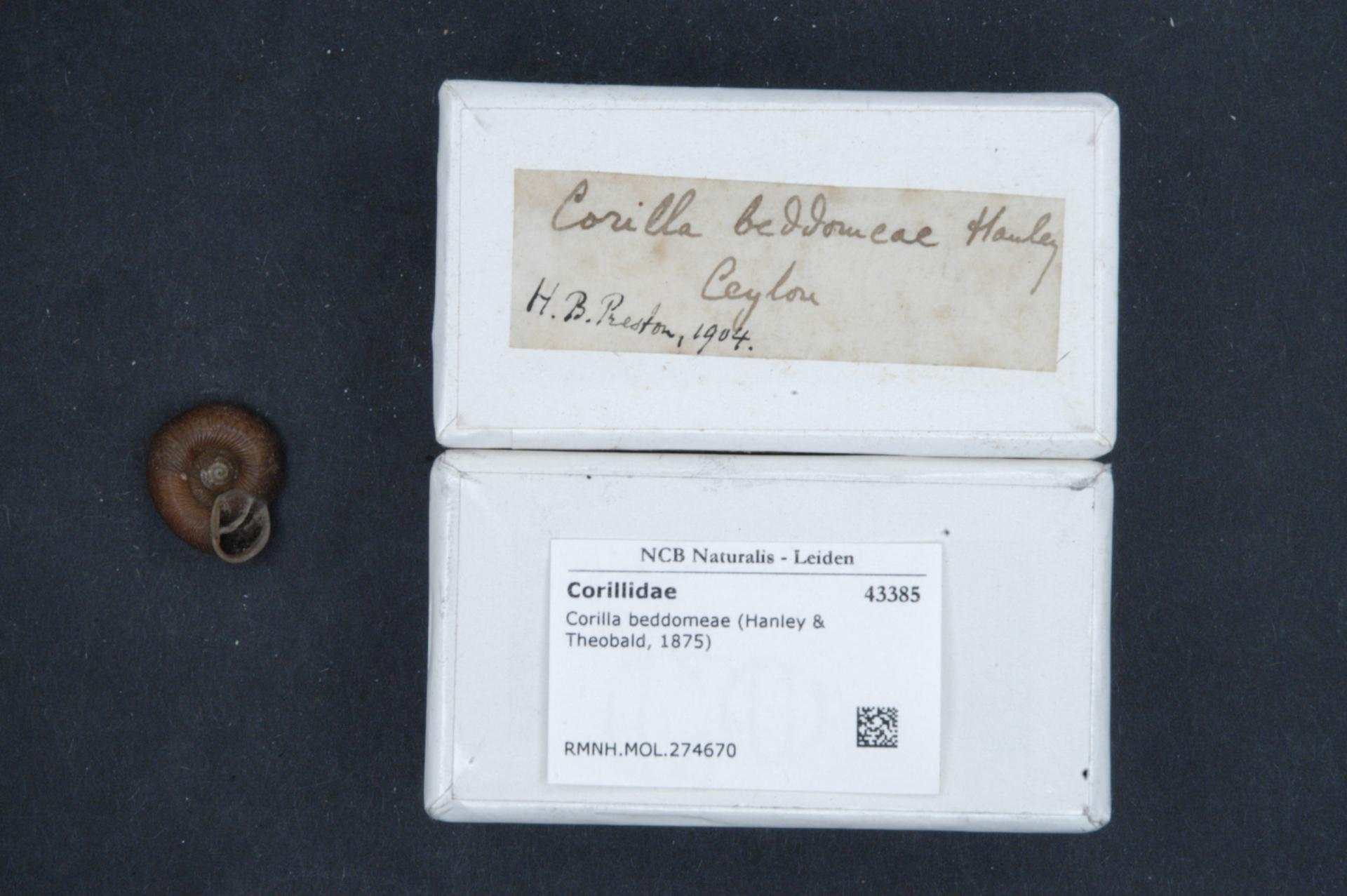
- Corilla beddomeae shell

Scientific classification
- Kingdom: Animalia
- Phylum: Mollusca
- Class: Gastropoda
- Order: Stylommatophora
- Family: Corillidae
- Genus: Corilla
- Species: C. beddomeae

Binomial name
- Corilla beddomeae (Hanley & Theobald, 1875)

Synonyms

= Corilla beddomeae =

Species of gastropod

Corilla beddomeae is a species of air-breathing land snail, a terrestrial pulmonate gastropod mollusk in the family Corillidae.

The specific name beddomeae is in honor of British naturalist Richard Henry Beddome.

== Distribution ==
Distribution of Corilla beddomeae includes Sri Lanka.
