= List of marine molluscs of Sri Lanka =

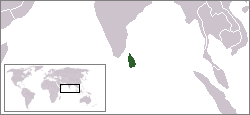
Location of Sri Lanka

The marine molluscs of Sri Lanka are a part of the molluscan wildlife of Sri Lanka.

== Land Snails ==
Phylum: Mollusca According to 2006 survey by De Silva, there are 240 marine snails species identified, which belong to four classes out of seven in the world.

Endemic species are highlighted with an asterisk (*).

== Class: Gastropoda ==
=== Family: Amathinidae ===
- Amathina tricarinata

=== Family: Psammobiidae ===
- Asaphis deflorata

=== Family: Buccinidae ===
- Pollia undosa

=== Family: Muricidae ===
- Chicoreus brunneus

=== Family: Conidae ===
- Conus figulinus

=== Family: Dentaliidae ===
- Dentalium

=== Family: Ficidae ===
- Ficus

=== Family: Ampullinidae ===
- Globularia fluctuata

=== Family: Mesodesmatidae ===
- Mesodesma glabratum

=== Family: Buccinidae ===
- Phalium decussatum

=== Family: Tellinidae ===
- Pharaonella

=== Family: Terebridae ===
- Duplicaria raphanula
- Terebra commaculata
- Terebra

=== Family: Tonnidae ===
- Tonna luteostoma

=== Family: Cardiidae ===
- Vasticardium assimile
- Vasticardium rubicundum
- Maoricardium pseudolatum

=== Family: Mytilidae ===
- Perna virdis

=== Family: Chamidae ===
- Chama brassica

=== Family: Pectinidae ===
- Chlamys

=== Family: Cypraeidae ===
- Cypraea

=== Family: Trochidae ===
- Trochus radiatus

=== Family ===
- Antigona lamellaris

=== Family: Muricidae ===
- Thais rudolpi

=== Family: Nacellidae ===
- Cellana radiata

=== Family: Mytilidae ===
- Mytilus crassitestatus

=== Family: Veneridae ===
- Dosinia
- Pitar hebracea
- Pitar sulfureum
- Sunetta

=== Family ===
- Afrocardium latum

=== Family: Mactridae ===
- Mactra turgida

=== Family: Cardiidae ===
- Cerastoderma glaucum

=== Family ===
- Lactona incarnata

== Class: Polyplacophora ==
- Chiton

== See also ==
- List of non-marine molluscs of Sri Lanka
