= MV Acavus =

Oil tanker and merchant aircraft carrier

History
- Name: 1935: Acavus; 1952: Iacra
- Namesake: 1935: Acavus; 1952: synonym of Abra
- Owner: 1935: Anglo-Saxon Petroleum; 1952: Société Maritime Shell
- Port of registry: 1935: (United Kingdom) London; 1952: (France) Le Havre
- Builder: Workman, Clark & Co, Belfast
- Yard number: 536
- Launched: 24 November 1934
- Completed: January 1935
- Refit: 1943; 1946
- Identification: UK official number 163564; 1935: call sign GYDF; 1952: call sign FOBT
- Fate: Scrapped 1963

General characteristics
- Class & type: 1935: Triple Twelve oil tanker; 1943: Rapana-class MAC
- Tonnage: 8,010 GRT, 4,752 NRT
- Displacement: 16,000 long tons (16,000 t) full load
- Length: 1935: 465.0 ft (141.7 m) registered; 1943: 481 ft (147 m) overall
- Beam: 1935: 59.4 ft (18.1 m); 1943: 62 ft (19 m)
- Draught: 1935: 27 ft 6 1/4 in (8.39 m)
- Depth: 1935: 33.9 ft (10.3 m)
- Decks: 1
- Installed power: 8-cylinder Diesel engine; 502 NHP; 3,500 bhp
- Propulsion: 1 × screw
- Speed: 11 1/2 knots (21 km/h)
- Complement: as MAC: 100
- Sensors & processing systems: as built: wireless direction finding; echo sounding device; by 1958: as above, plus radar
- Armament: as MAC: 1 × 4-inch (102 mm) gun; 2 × Bofors 40mm autocannon; 6 × Oerlikon 20 mm cannon
- Aircraft carried: 3 × Fairey Swordfish
- Aviation facilities: flight deck: 461 ft × 62 ft (141 m × 19 m)

MV Acavus was a motor tanker that was built in 1935, and converted into a merchant aircraft carrier (MAC) in 1943. She was built for Anglo-Saxon Petroleum, which is part of Royal Dutch Shell. In 1952 she was transferred to a French subsidiary of Shell and renamed Iacra. She was scrapped in France in 1963.

Acavus was the last ship ever built by Workman, Clark and Company. The company was founded in 1879, and went into receivership in May 1935, about four months after completing Acavus.

== Building and registration ==
In the 1930s, Shell ordered a series of oil tankers called the "Triple Twelve class" from various shipyards. Workman, Clark built one member of the class. She was built as yard number 536; launched on 24 November 1934; and completed in January 1935. She was named after the Acavus genus of land snails. Her registered length was 465.0 ft (141.7 m); her beam was 59.4 ft (18.1 m); her depth was 33.9 ft (10.3 m); and her draught was 27 ft 6 1/4 in (8.39 m). Her tonnages were 8,010 GRT and 4,752 NRT. She had a raked bow and a cruiser stern. Her main superstructure, including her bridge, was amidships. Her engine room and single funnel were aft.

Acavus had a single screw. It was driven by an eight-cylinder, four-stroke, single-acting Diesel engine that was built by Hawthorn, Leslie of Newcastle upon Tyne. It was rated at 502 NHP or 3,500 bhp, and gave her a speed of 11 1/2 knots (21 km/h). As built, her navigation equipment included wireless direction finding, and an echo sounding device.

Acavus was registered at London. Her UK official number was 163564, and her call sign was GYDF.

== Second World War ==
During the Battle of France, a fortnight after the Dunkirk evacuation, Acavus was in Le Verdon-sur-Mer, at the mouth of the Garonne, downriver from Bordeaux. On 17 June, she and several other merchant ships left Le Verdon as part of Operation Aerial.

Tankers were a priority for conversion into defensively equipped merchant ships. Primary armament for a ship such as Acavus was a single 4-inch (102 mm) gun mounted on her poop deck, for defence against surface ships and submarines.

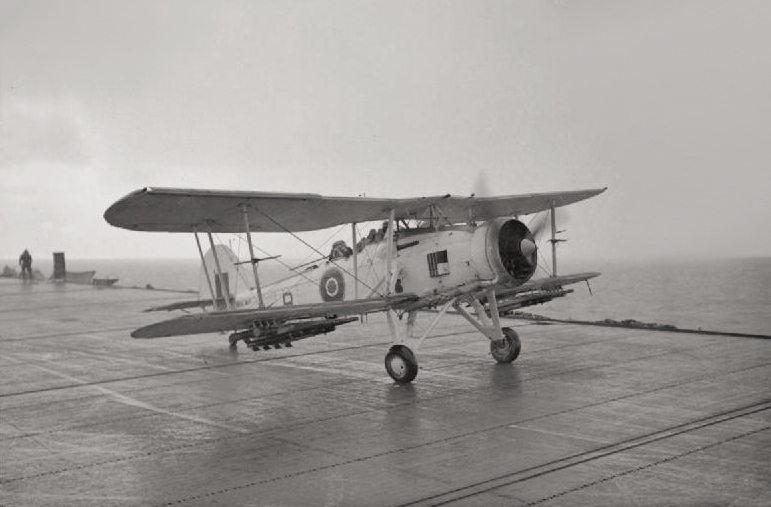
A Fairey Swordfish on the flight deck of an aircraft carrier

Between 1942 and 1944, nine of Shell's Triple Twelve class tankers were converted into MAC's. Silley, Cox & Co of Falmouth, Cornwall converted Acavus, fitting her out with a flight deck 461 ft (141 m) long by 62 ft (19 m) wide. She had no aircraft hangar or aircraft lift, but could carry three Fairey Swordfish torpedo bombers. Her armament was augmented with eight anti-aircraft guns: two Bofors 40mm autocannon and six Oerlikon 20 mm cannon. After conversion, her length overall was 481 ft (147 m), and her beam was 62 ft (19 m). Her displacement was 16,000 long tons (16,000 t) full load, and 8,000 long tons (8,100 t) standard.

As an MAC, Acavus continued to carry cargoes of oil. The conversion reduced her capacity by about 10 percent, and she was restricted to crude oil to reduce the fire hazard. She remained a Merchant Navy ship with civilian crew, but with the addition of Royal Navy aircrew and aircraft maintenance crew. She entered service as an MAC in October 1943. In 1945 or 1956 her flight deck was removed, and she was converted back into a conventional oil tanker.

== Iacra ==
In 1952, Shell transferred Acavus from Anglo-Saxon Petroleum to a French subsidiary, the Société Maritime Shell. She was renamed Iacra, after a genus of marine bivalves more usually called Abra. She was registered in Le Havre, and her call sign was changed to FOBT. By 1958, her navigation equipment included radar.

On 18 April 1963, Iacra arrived at La Seyne-sur-Mer on the Mediterranean coast of Southern France to be scrapped.

== Bibliography ==
- Hobbs, David (1996). Aircraft Carriers of the Royal and Commonwealth Navies. London: Greenhill Books. ISBN 1-85367-252-1.
- Hobbs, David (2013). British Aircraft Carriers: Design, Development and Service Histories. Barnsley: Seaforth Publishing. ISBN 978-1-84832-138-0.
- Lenton, HT; Colledge, JJ (1973). Warships of World War II. London: Ian Allan. ISBN 0-7110-0403-X.
- Lloyd's Register of Shipping (PDF). Vol. II.–Steamers and Motorships over 300 tons. London: Lloyd's Register of Shipping. 1935 – via Southampton City Council.
- Mercantile Navy List. London: Registrar General of Shipping and Seamen. 1937 – via Crew List Index Project.
- Register Book. Vol. I. A–L. London: Lloyd's Register of Shipping. 1952 – via Internet Archive.
- Register Book. Vol. I. Register of Ships. London: Lloyd's Register of Shipping. 1958 – via Internet Archive.
