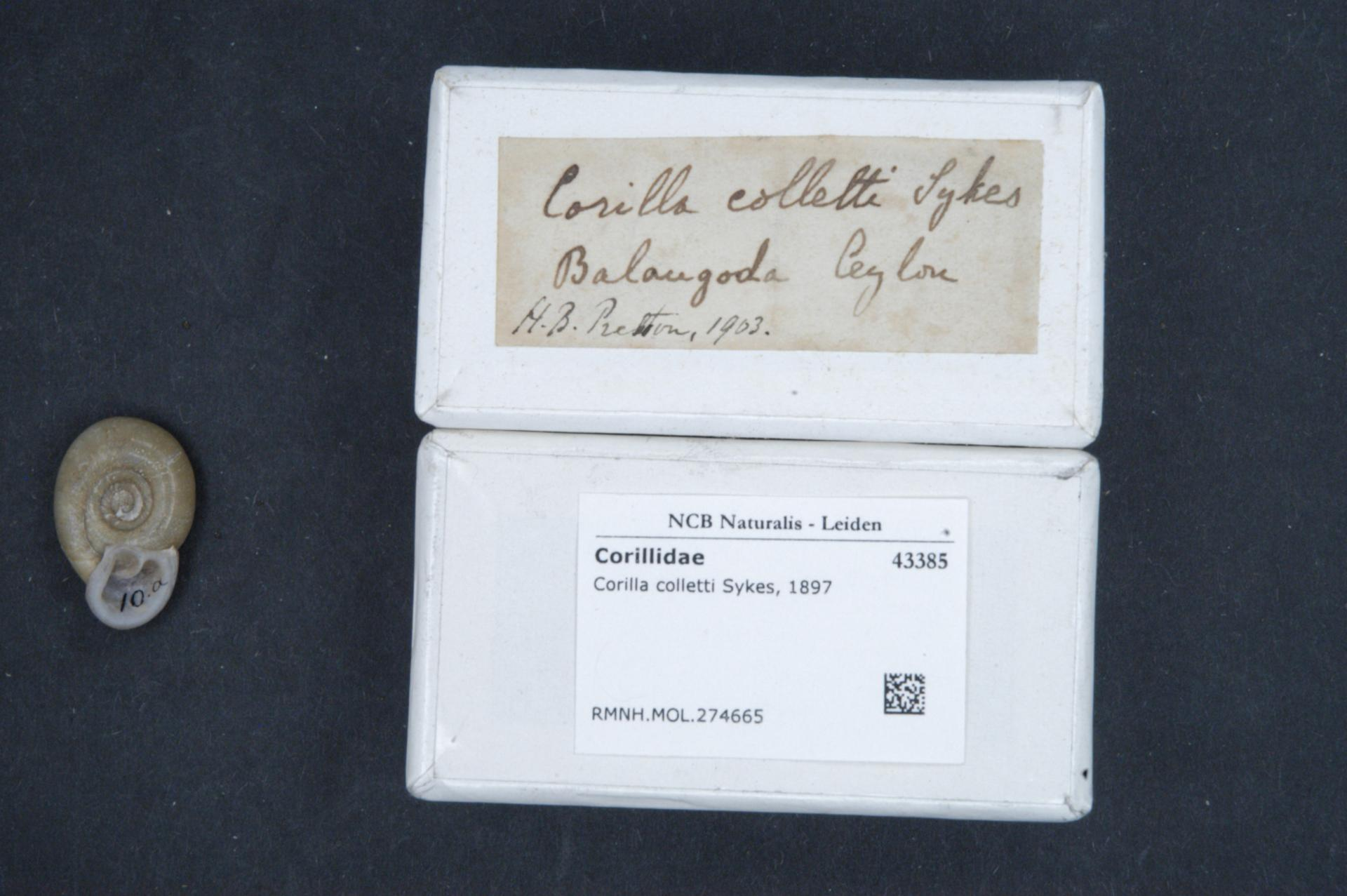
- Corilla coletti shell

Scientific classification
- Kingdom: Animalia
- Phylum: Mollusca
- Class: Gastropoda
- Order: Stylommatophora
- Family: Corillidae
- Genus: Corilla
- Species: C. coletti

Binomial name
- Corilla coletti Sykes, 1897

= Corilla colletti =

Species of gastropod

Corilla coletti is a species of air-breathing land snail, a terrestrial pulmonate gastropod mollusk in the family Corillidae.

== Distribution ==
Distribution of Corilla coletti includes Sri Lanka.
