= Craterodiscus pricei =

Conservation status
- Near Threatened (IUCN 2.3)

Scientific classification
- Kingdom: Animalia
- Phylum: Mollusca
- Class: Gastropoda
- Order: Stylommatophora
- Family: Corillidae
- Genus: Craterodiscus
- Species: C. pricei

Binomial name
- Craterodiscus pricei McMichael, 1958

Species of gastropod

Craterodiscus pricei is a species of air-breathing land snail, a terrestrial pulmonate gastropod mollusk in the family Camaenidae. This species is endemic to Australia.
