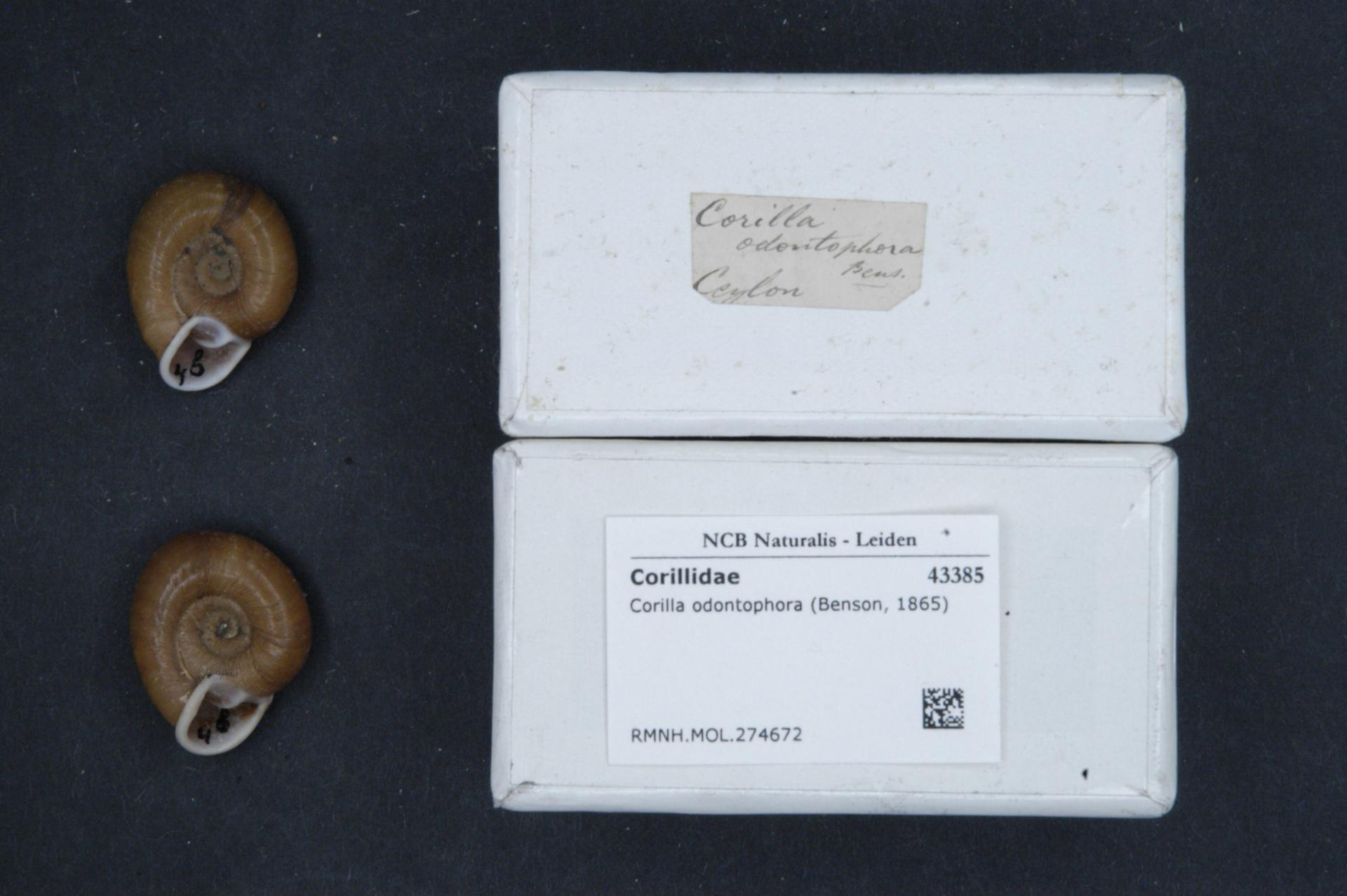
- Corilla odontophora shells

Scientific classification
- Kingdom: Animalia
- Phylum: Mollusca
- Class: Gastropoda
- Order: Stylommatophora
- Family: Corillidae
- Genus: Corilla
- Species: C. odontophora

Binomial name
- Corilla odontophora Benson, 1865

= Corilla odontophora =

Species of gastropod

Corilla odontophora is a species of air-breathing land snail, a terrestrial pulmonate gastropod mollusk in the family Corillidae.

== Distribution ==
Distribution of Corilla odontophora includes Sri Lanka.
