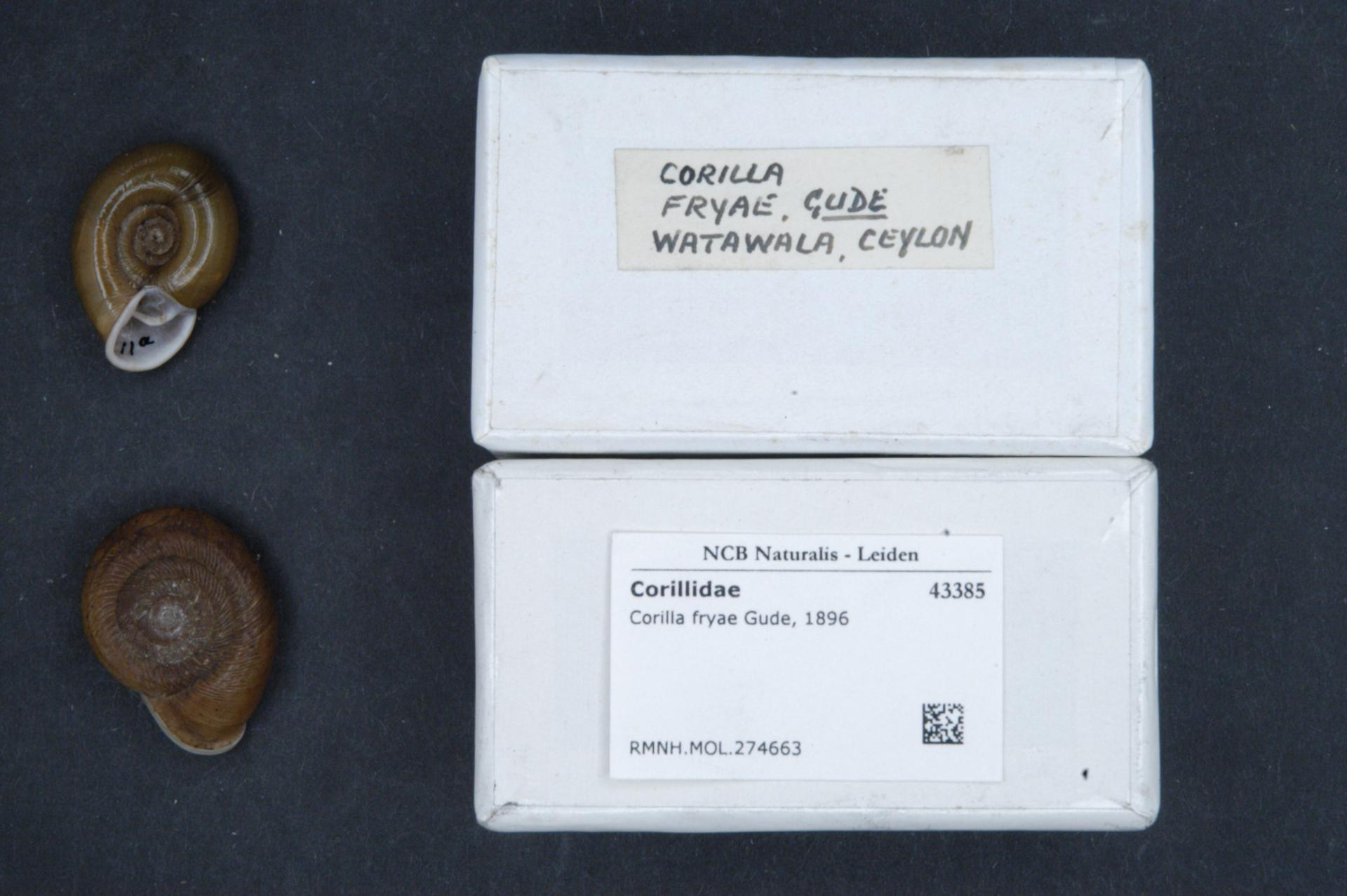
- Corilla fryae shells

Scientific classification
- Kingdom: Animalia
- Phylum: Mollusca
- Class: Gastropoda
- Order: Stylommatophora
- Family: Corillidae
- Genus: Corilla
- Species: C. fryae

Binomial name
- Corilla fryae Gude, 1896

= Corilla fryae =

Species of gastropod

Corilla fryae is a species of air-breathing land snail, a terrestrial pulmonate gastropod mollusk in the family Corillidae.

== Distribution ==
Distribution of Corilla fryae includes Sri Lanka.
