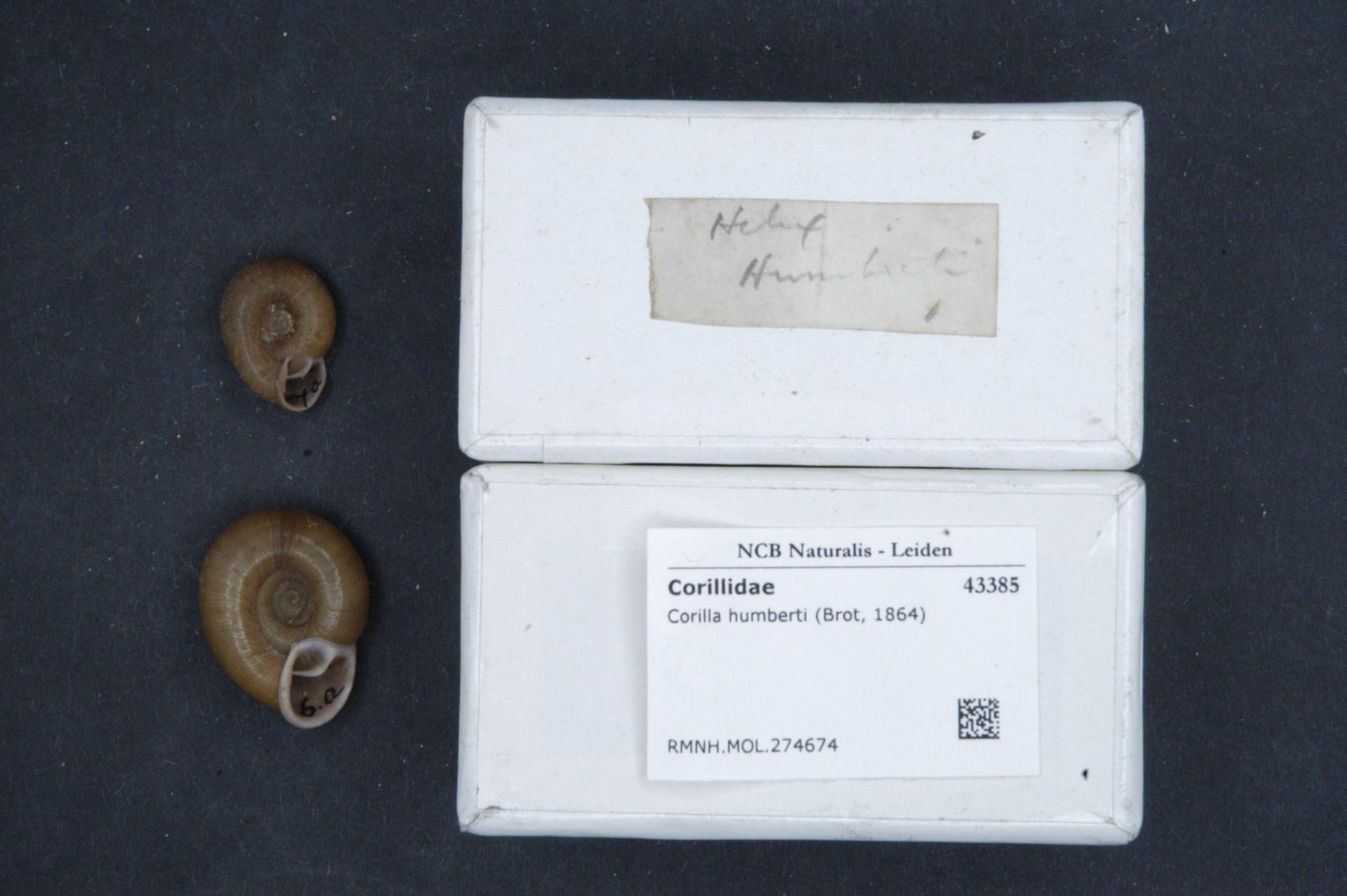
- Corilla humberti shells

Scientific classification
- Kingdom: Animalia
- Phylum: Mollusca
- Class: Gastropoda
- Order: Stylommatophora
- Family: Corillidae
- Genus: Corilla
- Species: C. humberti

Binomial name
- Corilla humberti (Brot, 1864)

Synonyms

= Corilla humberti =

Species of gastropod

Corilla humberti is a species of air-breathing land snail, a terrestrial pulmonate gastropod mollusk in the family Corillidae.

== Distribution ==
Distribution of Corilla humberti includes Sri Lanka.
