= Craterodiscus =

Scientific classification
- Kingdom: Animalia
- Phylum: Mollusca
- Class: Gastropoda
- Order: Stylommatophora
- Family: Corillidae
- Genus: Craterodiscus; McMichael, 1959

Genus of gastropods

Craterodiscus is a genus of air-breathing land snail, a terrestrial pulmonate gastropod mollusk in the family Corillidae.

== Species ==
- Craterodiscus costulatus Stanisic, 2010
- Craterodiscus pricei McMichael, 1959
