= Oligospira =

Scientific classification
- Kingdom: Animalia
- Phylum: Mollusca
- Class: Gastropoda
- Order: Stylommatophora
- Family: Acavidae
- Genus: Oligospira; C.M.F. Ancey, 1887

Genus of gastropods

Oligospira is a genus of air-breathing land snails, terrestrial pulmonate gastropod mollusks in the family Acavidae. These snails are endemic to Sri Lanka.

Three species are recognized. They have relatively round shells with flat tops.

== Species ==
- Oligospira polei (Collet, 1899)
- Oligospira skinneri (Reeve, 1854)
- Oligospira waltoni (Reeve, 1842)
