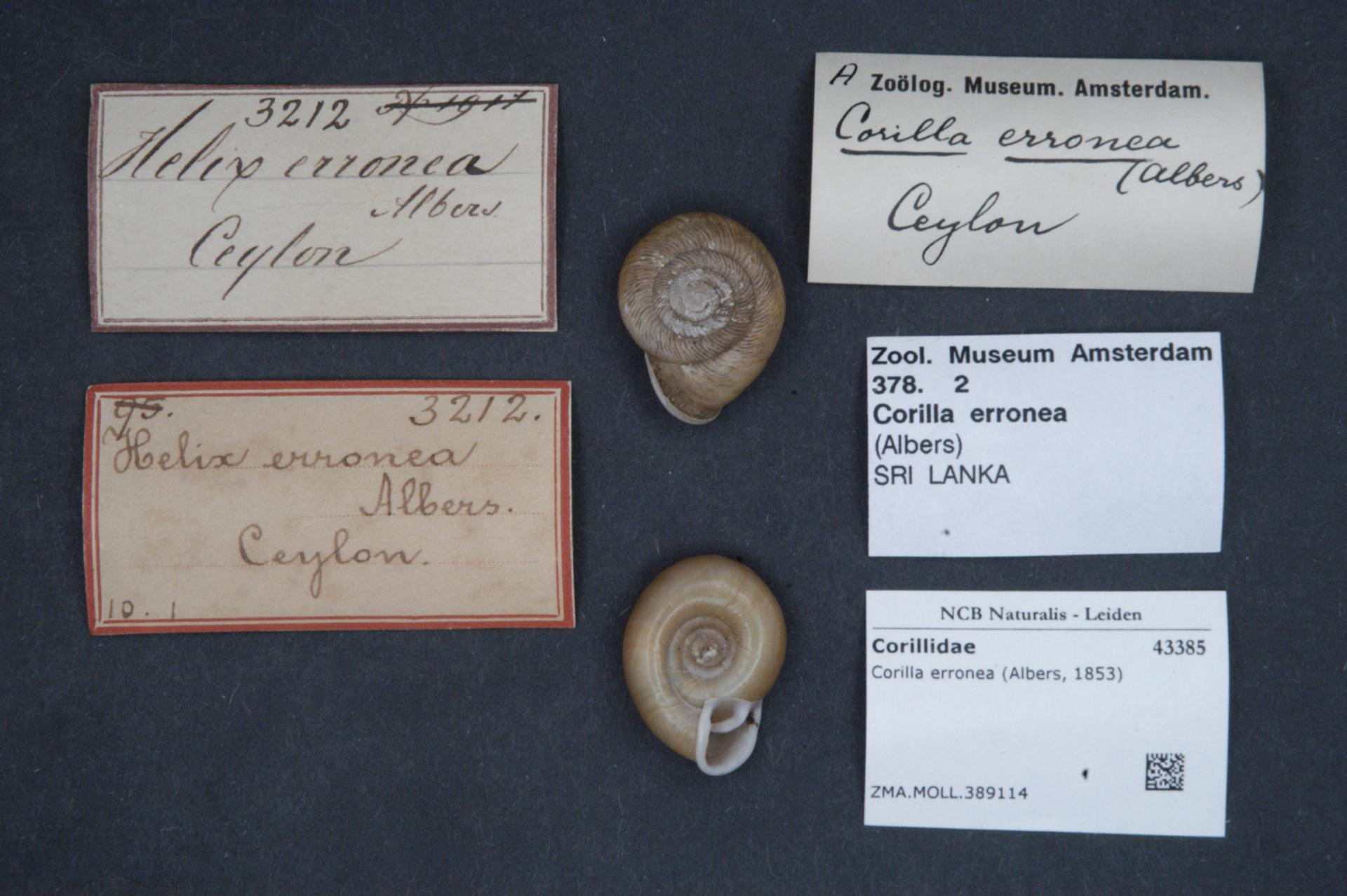
- Corilla erronea shells

Scientific classification
- Kingdom: Animalia
- Phylum: Mollusca
- Class: Gastropoda
- Order: Stylommatophora
- Family: Corillidae
- Genus: Corilla
- Species: C. erronea

Binomial name
- Corilla erronea (Albers, 1853)

Synonyms

= Corilla erronea =

Species of gastropod

Corilla erronea is a species of air-breathing land snail, a terrestrial pulmonate gastropod mollusk in the family Corillidae.

Variety of this species include Corilla erronea var. eronella Gude, 1896.

== Distribution ==
Distribution of Corilla erronea includes Sri Lanka.
