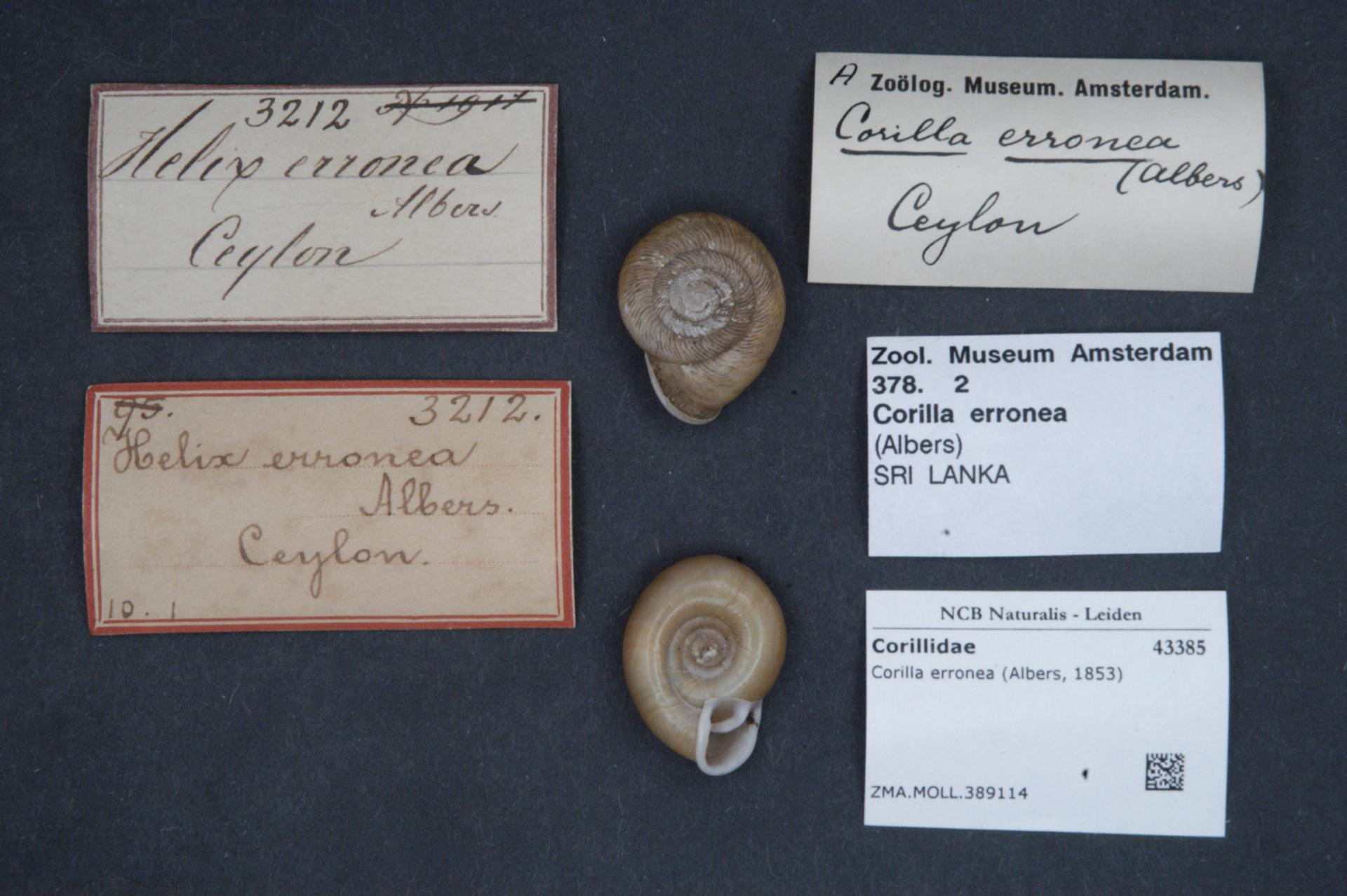
- Corilla erronea shells

Scientific classification
- Kingdom: Animalia
- Phylum: Mollusca
- Class: Gastropoda
- Order: Stylommatophora
- Family: Corillidae
- Genus: Corilla; Adams & Adams, 1855

= Corilla =

Genus of gastropods

Corilla is a genus of air-breathing land snails, terrestrial pulmonate gastropod mollusks in the family Corillidae. This family has no subfamilies (according to the taxonomy of the Gastropoda by Bouchet & Rocroi, 2005). It has been synonymised with Atopa Albers, 1850 and Helix (Corilla) Adams & Adams, 1855.

== Species ==
- Corilla adamsi (Gude, 1914)
- Corilla anax (Benson, 1865)
- Corilla beddomeae (Hanley & Theobald, 1876)
- Corilla carabinata (Férussac, 1821)
- Corilla colletti Sykes, 1897
- Corilla erronea (Albers, 1853)
- Corilla fryae Gude, 1896
- Corilla gudei Sykes, 1897
- Corilla humberti (Brot, 1864)
- Corilla lesleyae Barnacle, 1956
- Corilla odontophora (Benson, 1865)
