= Succinea ceylanica =

Scientific classification
- Kingdom: Animalia
- Phylum: Mollusca
- Class: Gastropoda
- Order: Stylommatophora
- Family: Succineidae
- Genus: Succinea
- Species: S. ceylanica

Binomial name
- Succinea ceylanica Pfeiffer, 1855

Species of gastropod

Succinea ceylanica is a species of air-breathing land snails, terrestrial pulmonate gastropod molluscs in the family Succineidae.

== Distribution ==
It is endemic to Sri Lanka.
