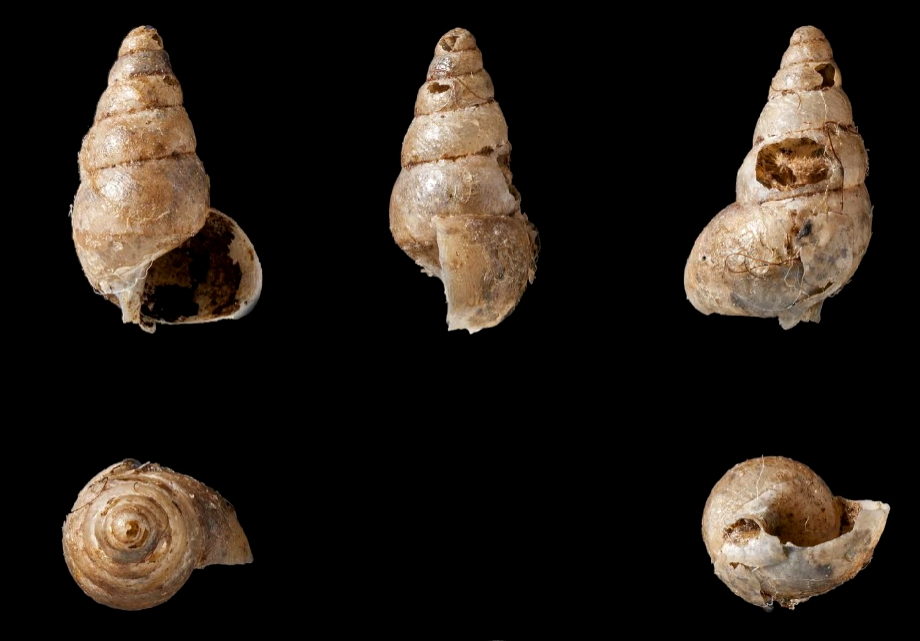
- Shell of Mirus panos

Scientific classification
- Kingdom: Animalia
- Phylum: Mollusca
- Class: Gastropoda
- Order: Stylommatophora
- Infraorder: Pupilloidei
- Superfamily: Pupilloidea
- Family: Enidae
- Genus: Mirus; Albers, 1850

Type species
- Bulimus cantorii Philippi, 1844

Synonyms
- Buliminus (Mirus) Albers, 1850 (unaccepted rank); Bulimus (Mirus) Albers, 1850 superseded rank; Ena (Mirus) Albers, 1850 (unaccepted rank)

= Mirus =

Genus of gastropods

Mirus is a genus of air-breathing land snails, terrestrial pulmonate gastropod mollusks in the subfamily Eninae of the family Enidae.

== Characteristics ==
(Original description in Latin) The shell of species in this genus is fissured-perforated (or narrowly umbilicate), it is subcylindrical, thin, and pellucid. It has 8 whorls; the body whorl is slightly ascending anteriorly (in front) and it equals 1/3 of the length of the shell

The columella is arched; the aperture is oval; the peristome (lip) is expanded. It is callous (thickened) internally, with the margins being subparallel and joined by a rather thick, dentate callus.

== Species ==
- Mirus acuminatus (Möllendorff, 1901)
- Mirus alboreflexus (Ancey, 1882)
- Mirus andersonianus (Möllendorff, 1885)
- Mirus antisecalinus (Heude, 1890)
- Mirus armandi (Ancey, 1882)
- Mirus aubryanus (Heude, 1885)
- Mirus avenaceus (Heude, 1885)
- Mirus brachystoma (Heude, 1882)
- Mirus brizoides (Möllendorff, 1901)
- Mirus cantorii (Philippi, 1844)
- Mirus chalcedonicus (Gredler, 1887)
- Mirus daucopsis (Heude, 1888)
- Mirus davidi (Deshayes, 1870)
- Mirus derivatus (Deshayes, 1874)
- † Mirus euonymus (Sturany, 1899)
- Mirus fargesianus (Heude, 1885)
- Mirus franzhuberi Thach, 2020
- Mirus frinianus (Heude, 1885)
- † Mirus funiculoides (Hsü, 1936)
- Mirus funiculus (Heude, 1882)
- Mirus gracilispirus Kajiyama & Habe, 1961 (homonym)
- Mirus gracilispirus (Möllendorff, 1901)
- Mirus hanleyanus (Kobelt, 1902)
- Mirus hartmanni (Ancey, 1888)
- Mirus interstratus (Sturany, 1899)
- Mirus japonicus (Möllendorff, 1885)
- Mirus junensis O.-K. Kwon & J.-S. Lee, 1991
- Mirus krejcii (Haas, 1933)
- Mirus meronianus (Heude, 1890)
- Mirus minutus (Heude, 1882)
- Mirus moupiniensis (Deshayes, 1870)
- Mirus murotonis (Kuroda & Habe, 1945)
- Mirus nilagiricus (L. Pfeiffer, 1846)
- Mirus nothus (Pilsbry, 1934)
- Mirus obongensis J.-S. Lee & D.-K. Min, 2018
- Mirus panos (Benson, 1853)
- Mirus praelongus (Ancey, 1882)
- Mirus proletarius (L. Pfeiffer, 1855)
- Mirus pyrinus (Möllendorff, 1901)
- Mirus reinianus (Kobelt, 1875)
- Mirus rugulosus (Möllendorff, 1900)
- Mirus saccatus (Möllendorff, 1902)
- Mirus siehoensis (Hilber, 1883)
- Mirus smithei (Benson, 1865)
- Mirus stalix (Benson, 1863)
- Mirus transiens (Ancey, 1888)
- Mirus ultriculus (Heude, 1882)
- Mirus utriculus (Heude, 1882)
- Mirus vicarius (W. T. Blanford, 1870)

Species brought into synonymy

- Mirus albescens (Möllendorff, 1884): synonym of Apoecus albescens (Möllendorff, 1884) (unaccepted combination)
- Mirus cantori (Philippi, 1844): synonym of Mirus cantorii (Philippi, 1844) (incorrect subsequent spelling)
- Mirus ceratinus (Benson, 1849): synonym of Nepaliena ceratina (Benson, 1849)
- Mirus granulatus (Möllendorff, 1884): synonym of Apoecus granulatus (Möllendorff, 1884) (superseded combination)
- Mirus hartmanni (Ancey, 1888): synonym of Mirus hartmani (Ancey, 1888) (incorrect subsequent spelling)
- Mirus huberi Thach, 2018 (taxon inquirendum, debated synonym)
- Mirus mupingianus (Deshayes, 1870): synonym of Mirus moupiniensis (Deshayes, 1870) (misspelling of specific epithet)
- Mirus trivialis (Ancey, 1888): synonym of Apoecus trivialis (Ancey, 1888) (unaccepted combination)
