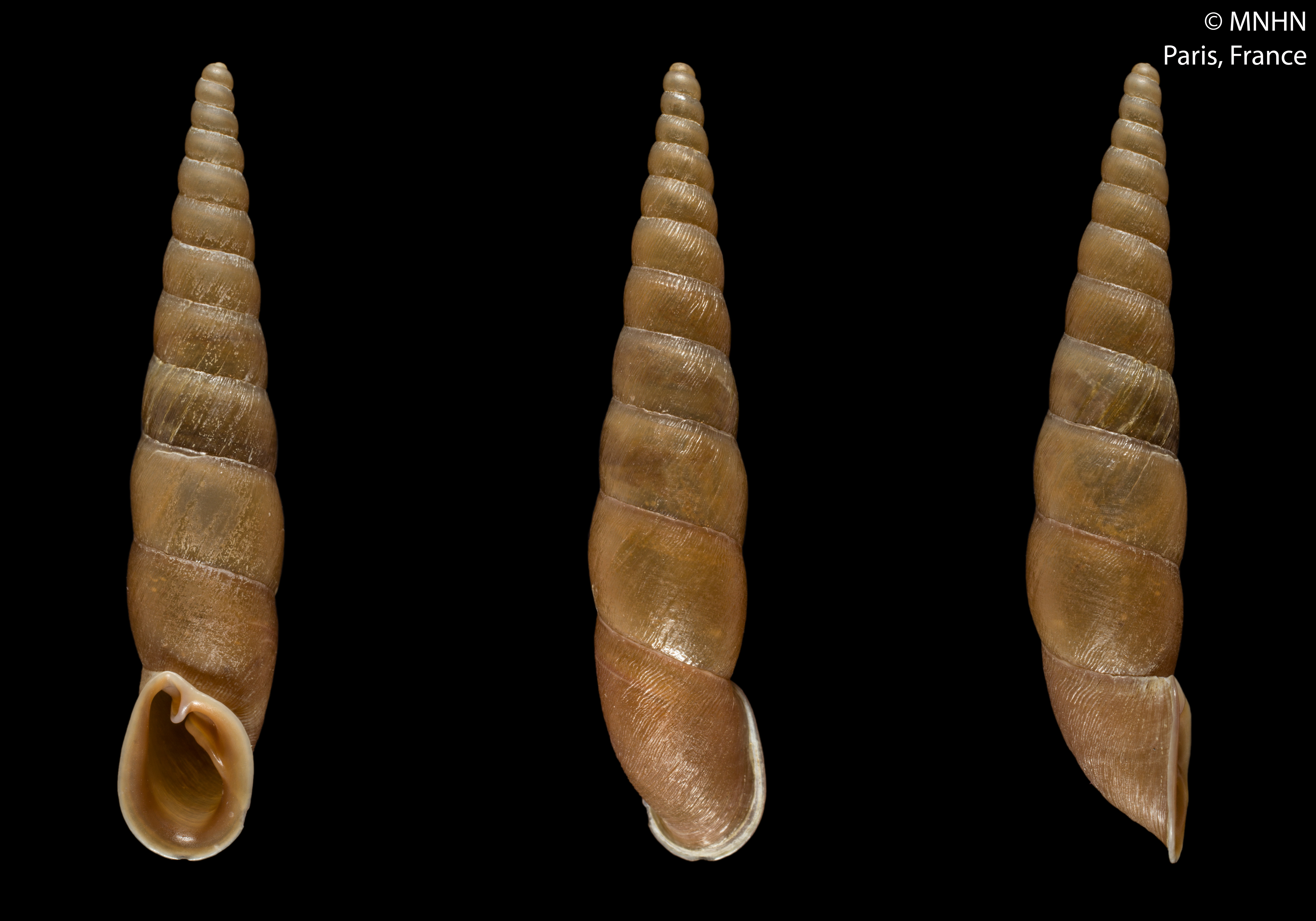
- Shell of Phaedusa paviei (syntype at MNHN, Paris)

Scientific classification
- Kingdom: Animalia
- Phylum: Mollusca
- Class: Gastropoda
- Order: Stylommatophora
- Infraorder: Clausilioidei
- Superfamily: Clausilioidea
- Family: Clausiliidae
- Genus: Phaedusa; H. Adams & A. Adams, 1855

Synonyms
- Calcariclavis Lindholm, 1924; Clausilia (Phaedusa) H. Adams & A. Adams, 1855 (original rank); Euphaedusa (Renschiphaedusa) Loosjes & Loosjes-van Bemmel, 1973; Phaedusa (Calcariclavis) Lindholm, 1924 (a junior synonym); Phaedusa (Metaphaedusa) H. Nordsieck, 2001· accepted, alternate representation; Phaedusa (Phaedusa) H. Adams & A. Adams, 1855· accepted, alternate representation; Polyptychephora A. J. Wagner, 1920; Renschiphaedusa Loosjes & Loosjes-van Bemmel, 1973 (junior synonym)

= Phaedusa =

Genus of gastropods

Phaedusa is a genus of terrestrial gastropods belonging to the subfamily Phaedusinae of the family Clausiliidae.

== Species ==
- Phaedusa abletti Pham & Szekeres, 2014
- Phaedusa adrianae E. Gittenberger & Leda, 2019
- Phaedusa angkanensis Loosjes, 1950
- Phaedusa angustocostata Köhler & Burg Mayer, 2016
- Phaedusa bhutanensis H. Nordsieck, 1974
- Phaedusa bocki (Sykes, 1895)
- Phaedusa boettgeri H. Nordsieck, 2001
- Phaedusa borneensis (L. Pfeiffer, 1855)
- Phaedusa burmanica (Gude, 1914)
- Phaedusa ceylanica (Benson, 1863)
- Phaedusa chimiae E. Gittenberger & Sherub, 2019
- Phaedusa coccygea (Gredler, 1888)
- Phaedusa cochinchinensis (L. Pfeiffer, 1841)
- Phaedusa corticina (L. Pfeiffer, 1842)
- Phaedusa cumingiana (L. Pfeiffer, 1845)
- Phaedusa dichroa (Bavay & Dautzenberg, 1899)
- Phaedusa dorsoplicata Loosjes, 1953
- Phaedusa elisabethae (Möllendorff, 1881)
- Phaedusa eupleura (Bavay & Dautzenberg, 1899)
- Phaedusa filialis (E. Martens, 1903)
- Phaedusa filicostata (Stoliczka, 1873)
- Phaedusa hainanensis (Möllendorff, 1884)
- Phaedusa hamonvillei (Bavay & Dautzenberg, 1899)
- Phaedusa hayasii Kuroda, 1941
- Phaedusa hilberi (O. Boettger, 1884)
- Phaedusa inanis (Bavay & Dautzenberg, 1909)
- Phaedusa kazueae Hunyadi & Szekeres, 2021
- Phaedusa kelantanensis (Sykes, 1902)
- Phaedusa lemani (Gude, 1914)
- Phaedusa lucens Loosjes, 1953
- Phaedusa lypra (J. Mabille, 1887)
- Phaedusa matejkoi Grego & Szekeres, 2011
- Phaedusa micropaviei H. Nordsieck, 2011
- Phaedusa moluccensis (E. von Martens, 1864)
- Phaedusa pahangensis (Laidlaw, 1929)
- Phaedusa pallidocincta (Möllendorff, 1886)
- Phaedusa paviei (Morlet, 1893)
- Phaedusa percostata H. Nordsieck, 2016
- Phaedusa phongthoensis Loosjes & Loosjes-van Bemmel, 1949
- Phaedusa potanini (Möllendorff, 1902)
- Phaedusa pseudaculus H. Nordsieck, 2001
- Phaedusa pseudobensoni (Schmacker & O. Boettger, 1894)
- Phaedusa pygmaea Grego & Szekeres, 2011
- Phaedusa ramelauensis Köhler & Burg Mayer, 2016
- Phaedusa recondita (Sykes, 1894)
- Phaedusa sangayae E. Gittenberger & Leda, 2019
- Phaedusa shanica (O. Boettger, 1888)
- Phaedusa sorella H. Nordsieck, 2003
- Phaedusa stenothyra Möllendorff, 1901
- Phaedusa stenotrema Thompson & Dance, 1983
- Phaedusa subgranulosa H. Nordsieck, 2003
- Phaedusa szechuanensis Pilsbry, 1934
- Phaedusa theobaldi (W. T. Blanford, 1872)
- Phaedusa theristica (Mabille, 1887)
- Phaedusa timorensis H. Nordsieck, 2007
