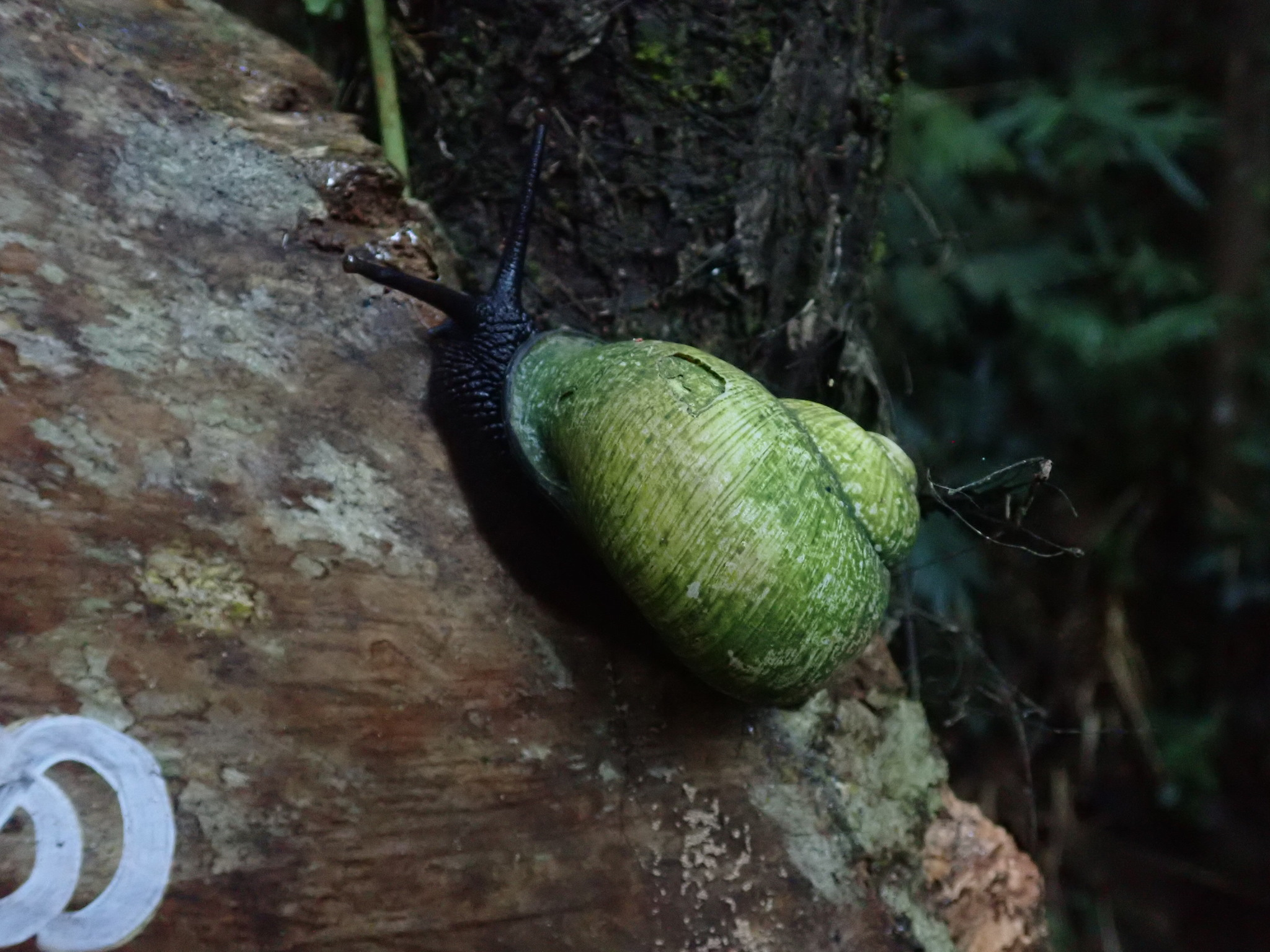

Scientific classification
- Kingdom: Animalia
- Phylum: Mollusca
- Class: Gastropoda
- Order: Stylommatophora
- Family: Acavidae
- Genus: Acavus
- Species: A. phoenix

Binomial name
- Acavus phoenix Pfeiffer, 1854

= Acavus phoenix =

Giant Land Snail

Species of gastropod

Acavus phoenix, the giant land snail, is a species of air-breathing land snails, terrestrial pulmonate gastropod mollusks in the family Acavidae.

== Taxonomy ==
There are two subspecies recognized:

- Acavus phoenix phoenix
- Acavus phoenix castaneus

== Description ==
Acavus phoenix is the most common Acavus species on the island. Shell about 60mm in diameter and is rose colored and body black colored.

== Distribution and habitat ==
This species is endemic to Sri Lanka. It is confined to wet zone of the country.

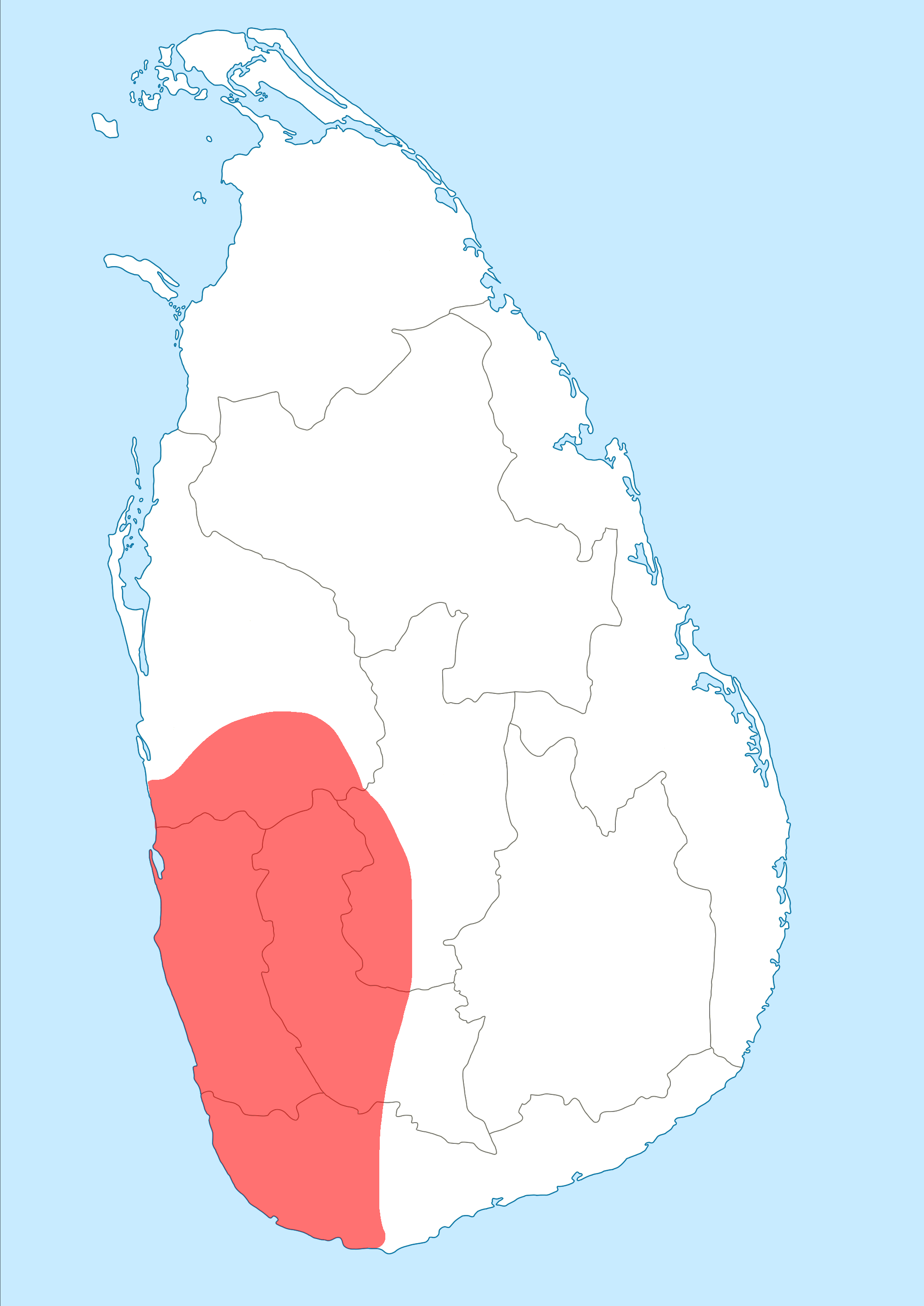
Acavus phoenix Habitat Map
