= Ratnadvipia irradians =

Scientific classification
- Kingdom: Animalia
- Phylum: Mollusca
- Class: Gastropoda
- Order: Stylommatophora
- Family: Ariophantidae
- Genus: Ratnadvipia
- Species: R. irradians

Binomial name
- Ratnadvipia irradians (Pfeiffer, 1852)

Species of gastropod

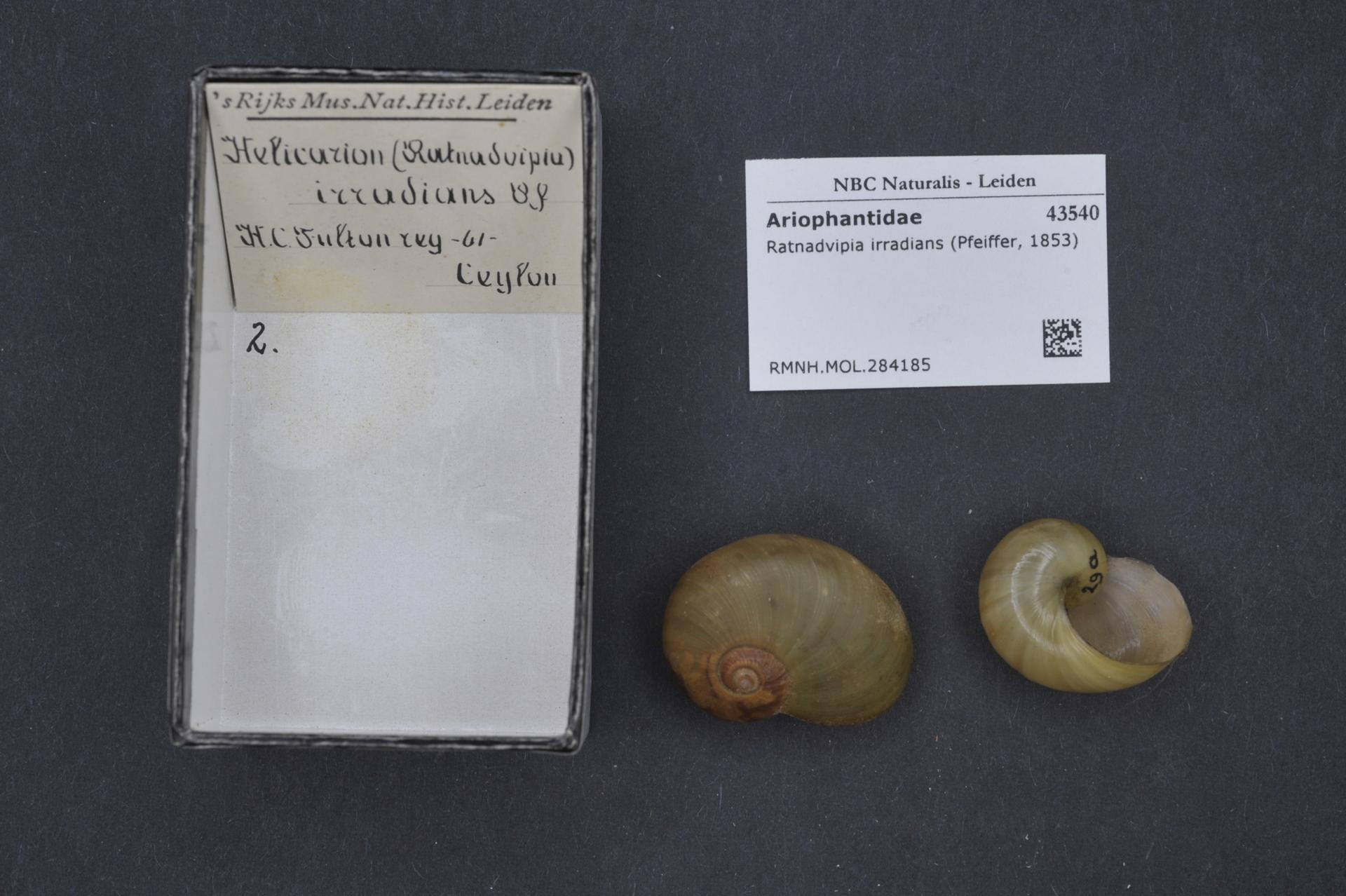
Ratnadvipia irradians (Pfeiffer, 1853)

Ratnadvipia irradians is a species of air-breathing land snail, a terrestrial pulmonate gastropod mollusk in the family Ariophantidae. It is endemic to the island of Sri Lanka.

== Description ==
Shell is thin and solid, color ranging from bright golden brown to greenish yellow. Apex obtuse. Lunate oval aperture is large, and very oblique. Foot pale.

== Ecology ==
It is the most widespread of Sri Lanka's endemic land snails, which can be found in dry zone and intermediate forests and home gardens.
