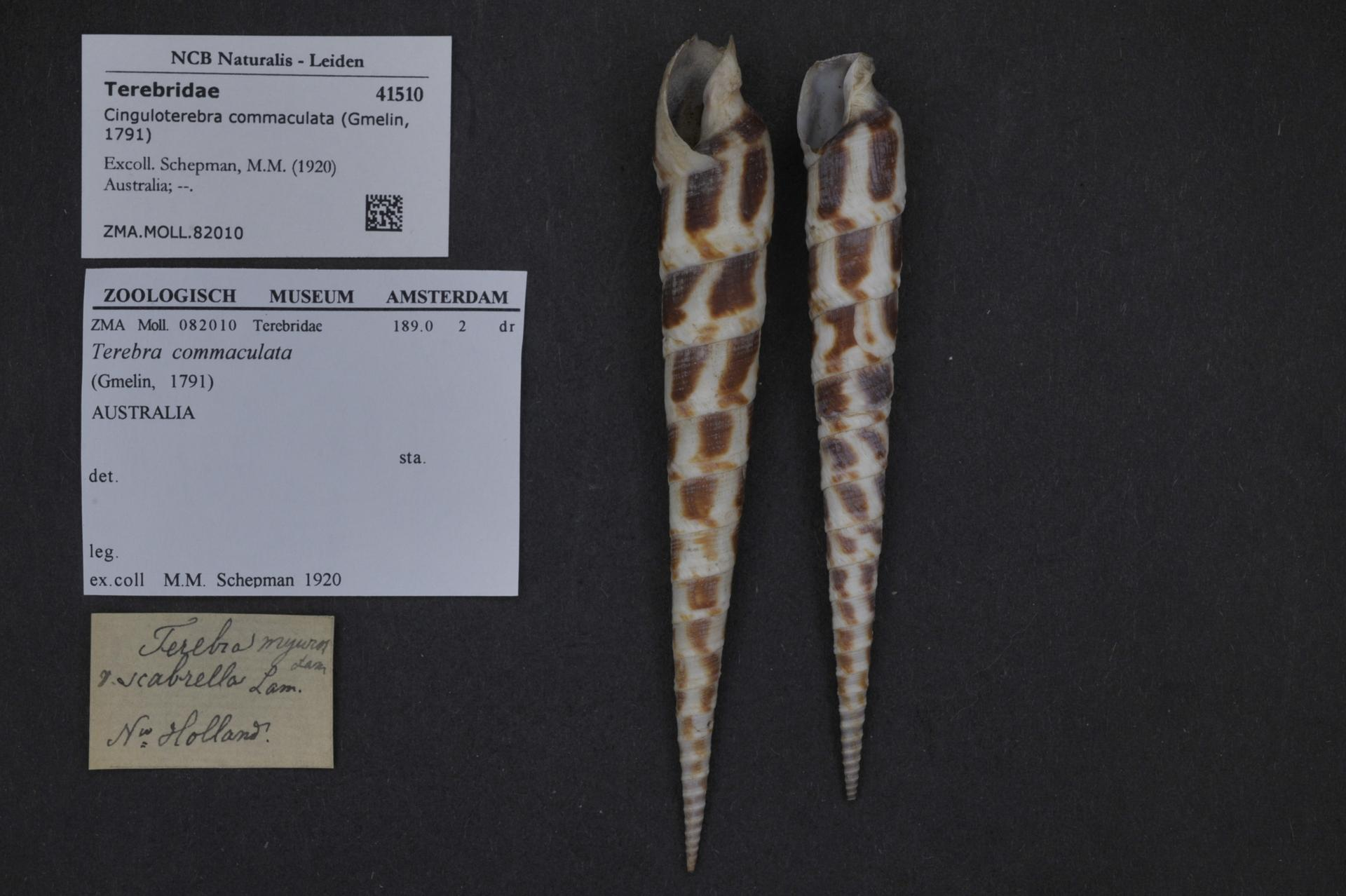
- Preserved shell

Scientific classification
- Kingdom: Animalia
- Phylum: Mollusca
- Class: Gastropoda
- Subclass: Caenogastropoda
- Order: Neogastropoda
- Family: Terebridae
- Genus: Terebra
- Species: T. commaculata

Binomial name
- Terebra commaculata (Gmelin, 1791)

Synonyms
- Buccinum commaculatum Gmelin, 1791; Cinguloterebra commaculata (Gmelin, 1791); Epitonium acutissimum Röding, 1798; Myurella myuros (Lamarck, 1822); Terebra myuros Lamarck, 1822

= Terebra commaculata =

Species of sea snail

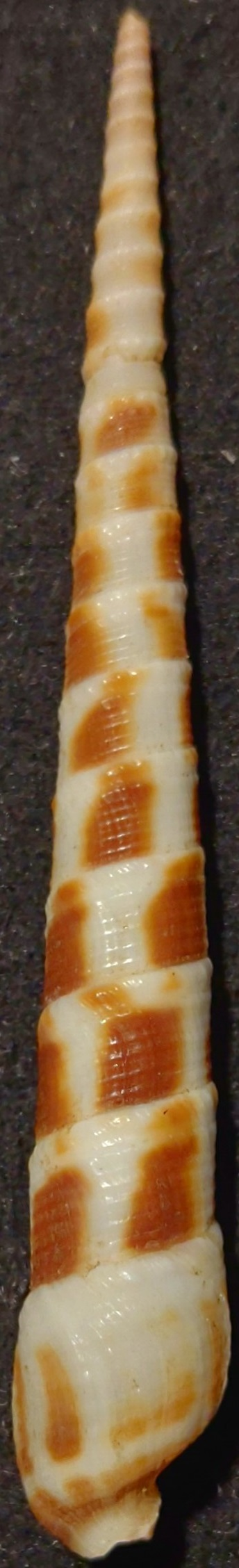

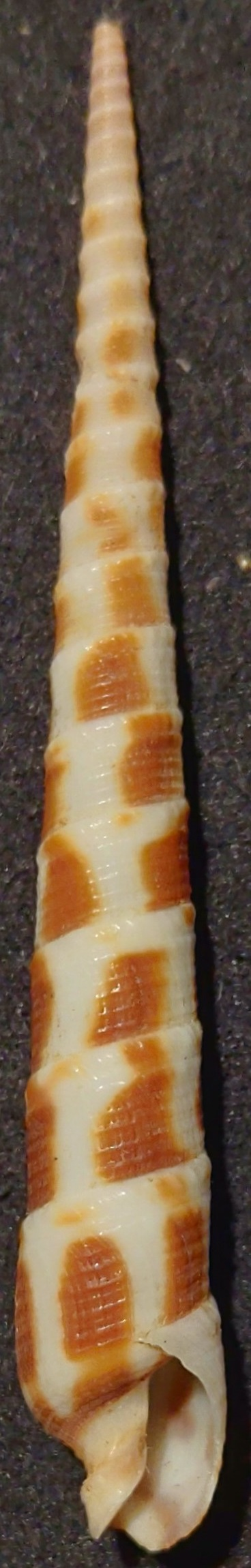

Terebra commaculata is a species of sea snail, a marine gastropod mollusc in the family Terebridae, the auger snails.
