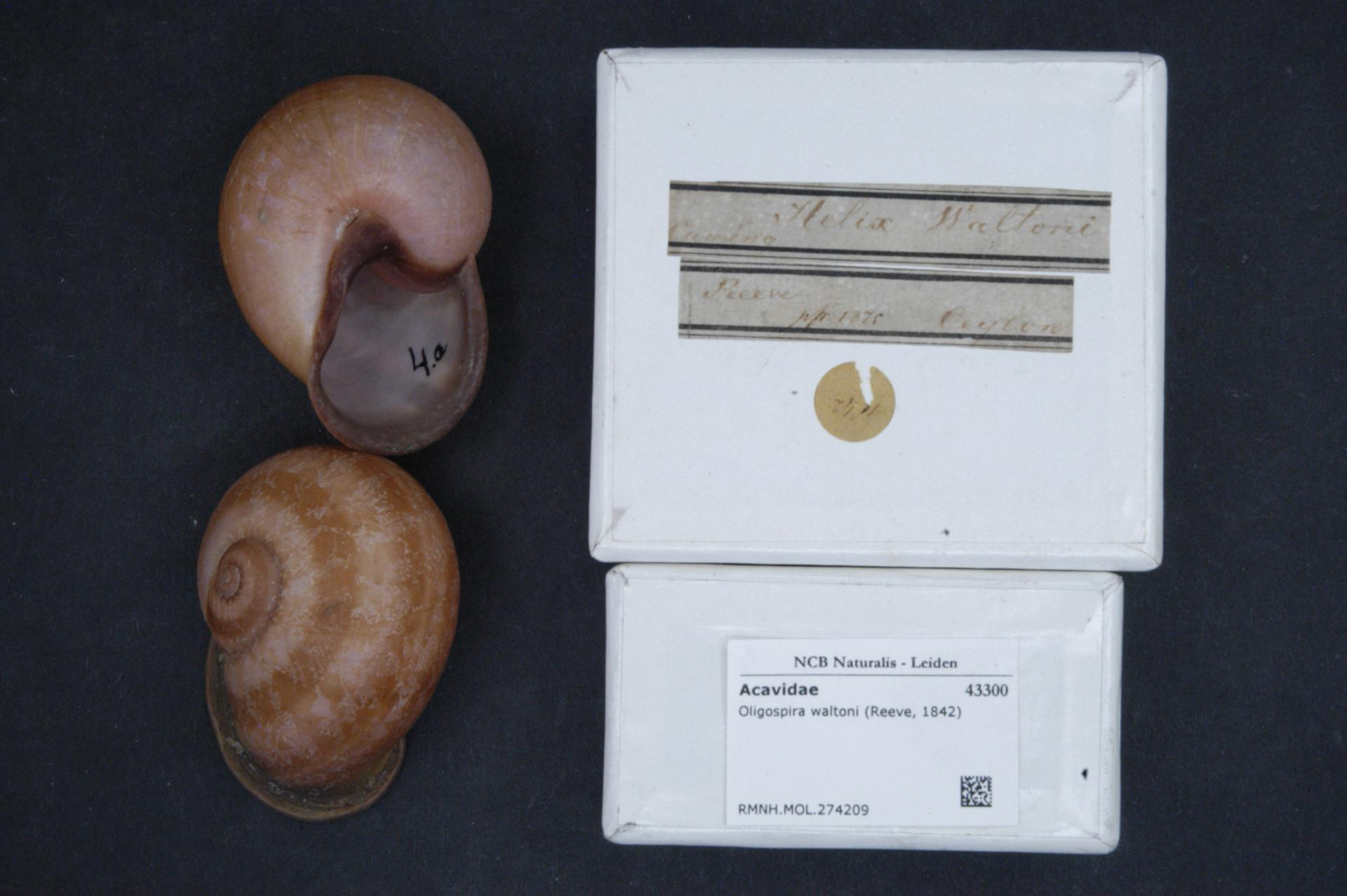

Scientific classification
- Kingdom: Animalia
- Phylum: Mollusca
- Class: Gastropoda
- Order: Stylommatophora
- Family: Acavidae
- Genus: Oligospira
- Species: O. waltoni

Binomial name
- Oligospira waltoni (Reeve 1842)

Synonyms
- Acavus waltoni Reeve 1842

= Oligospira waltoni =

Species of gastropod

Oligospira waltoni is a species of air-breathing land snails, terrestrial pulmonate gastropod mollusks in the family Acavidae. It is endemic to Sri Lanka. Comes from the Oligospira genus.

== Description ==
It has a rosy brown shell with a dark brown lip.

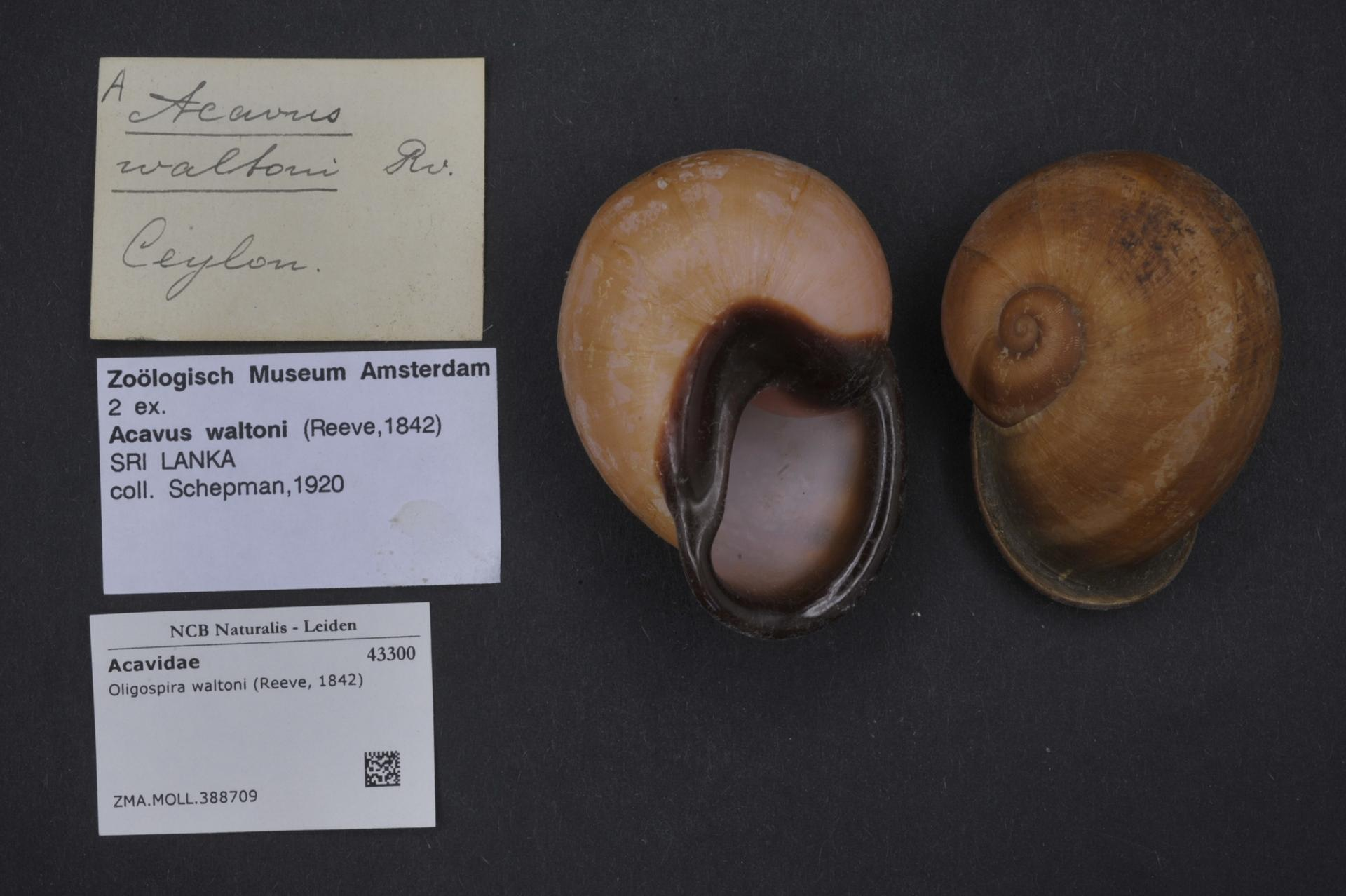
Oligospira waltoni

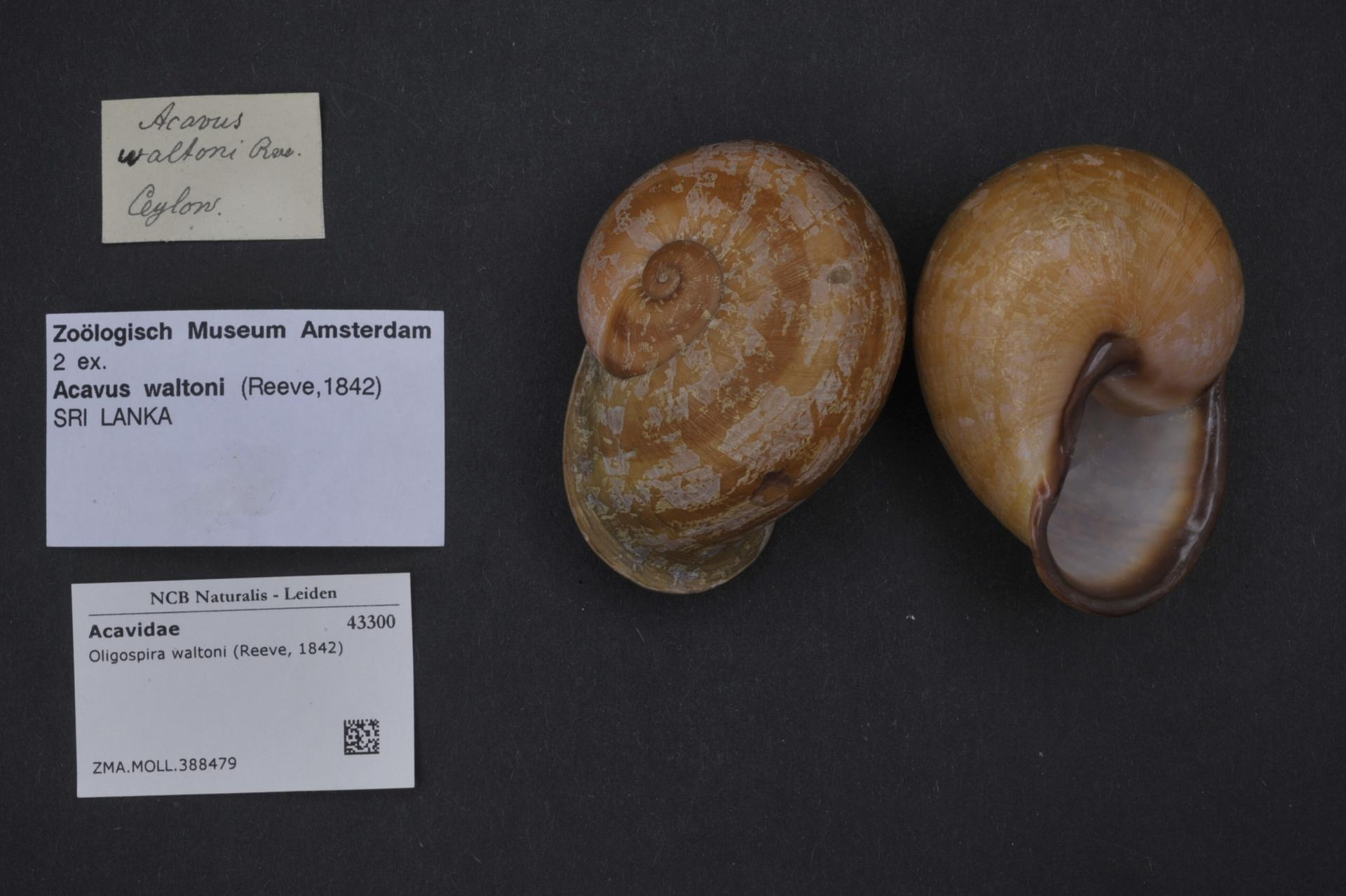
Oligospira waltoni
