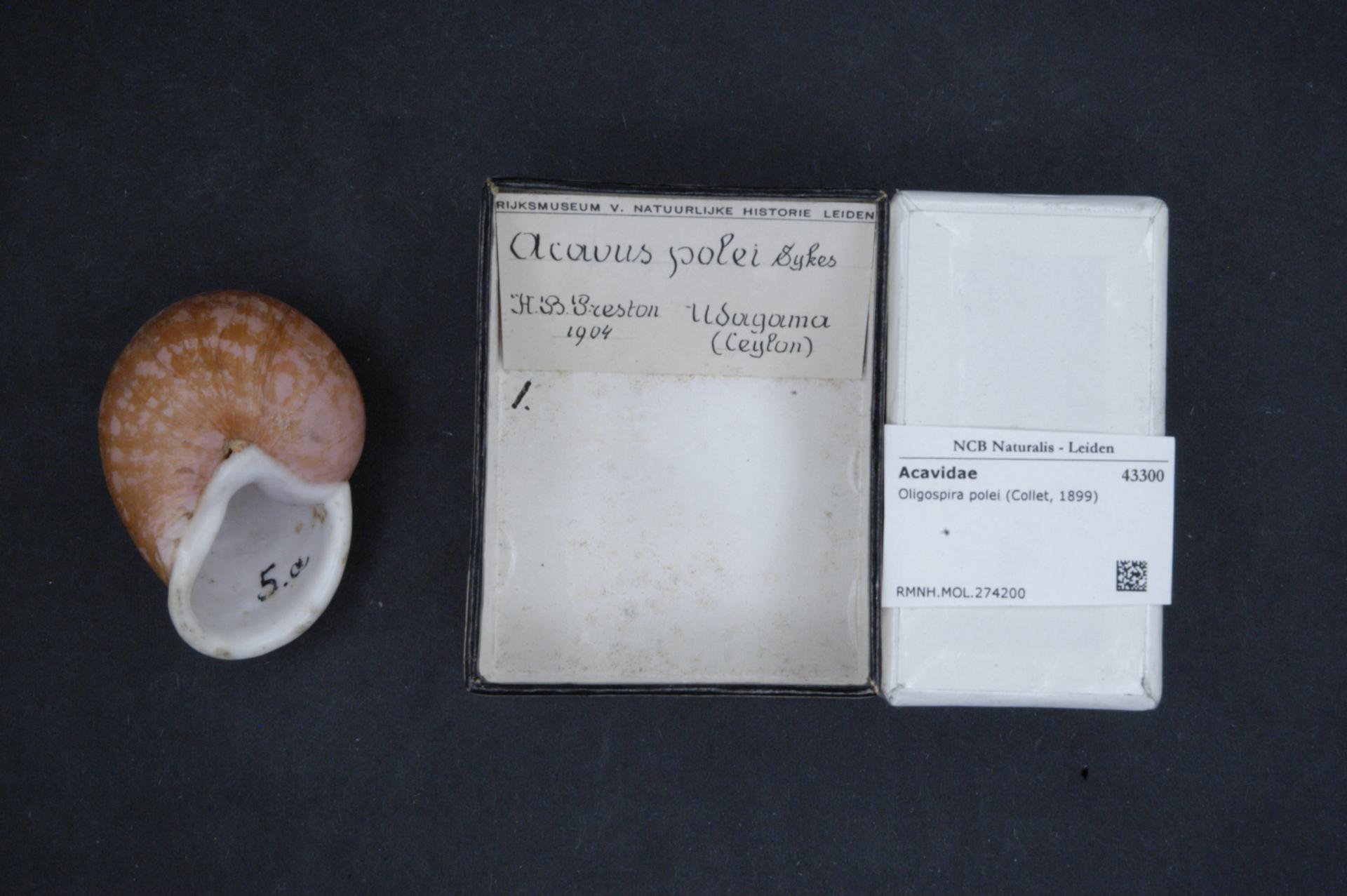

Scientific classification
- Kingdom: Animalia
- Phylum: Mollusca
- Class: Gastropoda
- Order: Stylommatophora
- Family: Acavidae
- Genus: Oligospira
- Species: O. polei

Binomial name
- Oligospira polei (Collet, 1899)

Synonyms
- Acavus polei Breston, 1904

= Oligospira polei =

Species of gastropod

Oligospira polei is a species of air-breathing land snails, terrestrial pulmonate gastropod mollusks in the family Acavidae. It is endemic to Sri Lanka.

== Description ==
Shell orange brown with a white shell lip. Juvenile has a yellowish shell. They are mostly ground dwellers.
