= Mirus proletarius =

Scientific classification
- Domain: Eukaryota
- Kingdom: Animalia
- Phylum: Mollusca
- Class: Gastropoda
- Order: Stylommatophora
- Family: Enidae
- Genus: Mirus
- Species: M. proletarius

Binomial name
- Mirus proletarius (L. Pfeiffer, 1855)

Synonyms
- Bulimus proletarius L. Pfeiffer, 1855

Species of terrestrial snails

Mirus proletarius is a species of air-breathing land snails, a terrestrial pulmonate gastropod in the subfamily Eninae of the family Enidae.

== Description ==
The shell is 15 mm (0.59 in) in length, 6 mm (0.24 in) in diameter, is elongated, with flattened lips.

(Original description in Latin) The shell is compressedly umbilicate, oblong-turrite, somewhat solid, very finely granulated under a lens, slightly glossy, and horn-brown in color. The spire is elongated and somewhat blunt.

There are 7 convex whorls, with the body whorl barely exceeding one-third of the total shell length, slightly ascending anteriorly, and somewhat compressed at the base.

The aperture is slightly oblique and oblong. The peristome has a white border, with the margins close together. The right margin is expanded and strongly arched at the top, while the columellar margin is widened and open.

This species was first described in 1855 by German conchologist Ludwig Karl Georg Pfeiffer.

== Distribution ==
M. proletarius is endemic to Sri Lanka.
