= Ratnadvipia karui =

Scientific classification
- Kingdom: Animalia
- Phylum: Mollusca
- Class: Gastropoda
- Order: Stylommatophora
- Family: Ariophantidae
- Genus: Ratnadvipia
- Species: R. karui

Binomial name
- Ratnadvipia karui Pfeiffer, 1854

Species of gastropod

Ratnadvipia karui is a species of air-breathing land snail, a terrestrial pulmonate gastropod mollusk in the family Ariophantidae. It is endemic to island of Sri Lanka.

== Etymology ==
The specific name karui was for the honor for G.P.B. Karunaratne (1931–1996), who was a renowned Sri Lankan naturalist.

== Description ==
Shell is glossy and polished, partly membranaceous, and oval elongately. Mantle found as a broad band around shell and covers all or nearly all of the shell. Shell golden yellow to deep golden-brown in color. Juveniles highly variable in color ranges from dark steel grey, pale bluish or yellowish grey, or greyish white.

== Ecology ==
It can be found in dry zone and lower wet zonal forests and home gardens. When disturbed or touches, it produces a clear, brilliant orange-red mucus.
