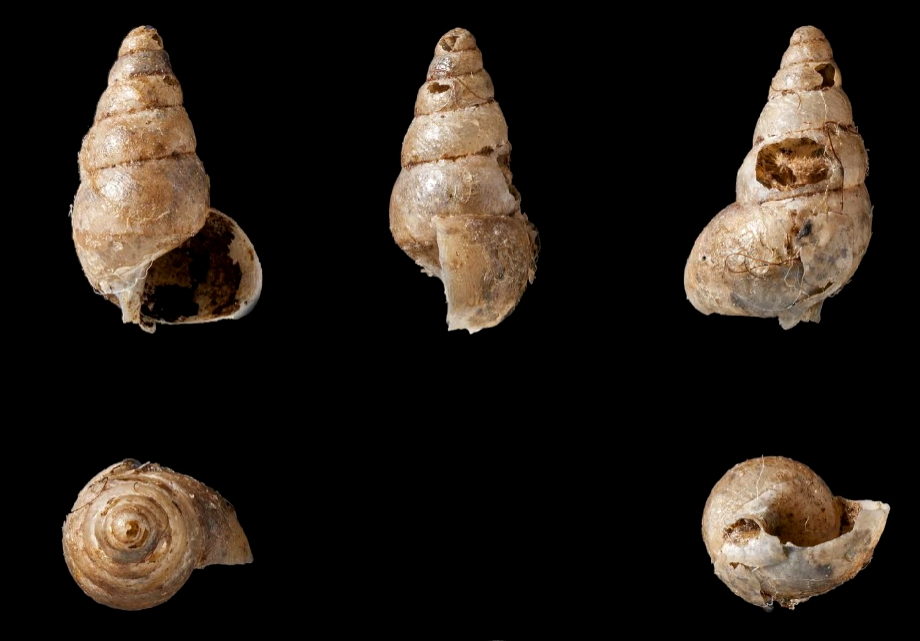
- Shell of Mirus panos (syntype at the Natural History Museum, London)

Scientific classification
- Domain: Eukaryota
- Kingdom: Animalia
- Phylum: Mollusca
- Class: Gastropoda
- Order: Stylommatophora
- Family: Enidae
- Genus: Mirus
- Species: M. panos

Binomial name
- Mirus panos (W. H. Benson, 1853)

Synonyms
- Bulimus panos W. H. Benson, 1853

= Mirus panos =

Species of terrestrial snails

Mirus panos is a species of air-breathing land snails, a terrestrial pulmonate gastropod in the subfamily Eninae of the family Enidae. E. panos are endemic to Sri Lanka.

The shell ranges in size from 3–11 mm (0.12–0.43 in) in length, is elongated, with flattened lips.

They were first described in 1853 by British malacologist William Henry Benson.
