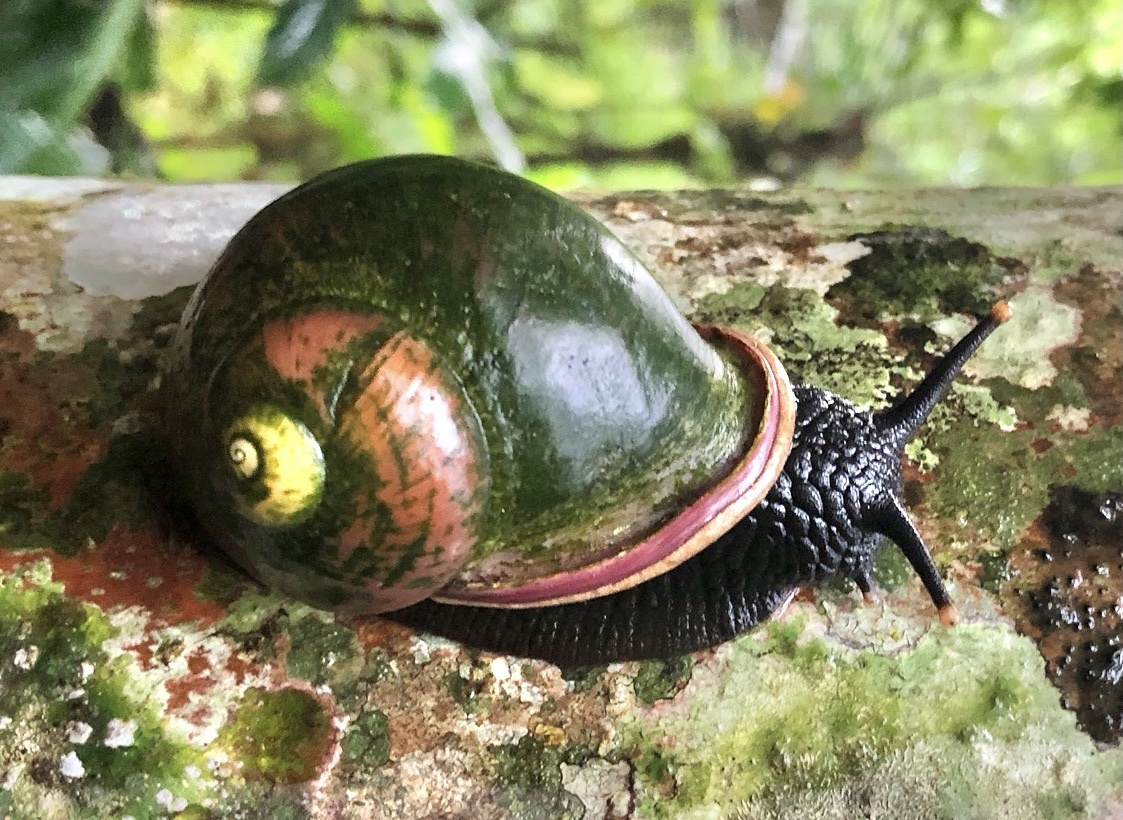

Scientific classification
- Kingdom: Animalia
- Phylum: Mollusca
- Class: Gastropoda
- Order: Stylommatophora
- Family: Acavidae
- Genus: Acavus
- Species: A. superbus

Binomial name
- Acavus superbus Pfeiffer, 1854

= Acavus superbus =

Species of gastropod

Acavus superbus is a species of air-breathing land snails, terrestrial pulmonate gastropod mollusks in the family Acavidae.

Three subspecies recognized.

== Description ==
Acavus superbus has green colored shell and rose brown body.

== Distribution ==
This species is endemic to Sri Lanka. It is confined to wet zone of the country.

== Subspecies ==
- Acavus superbus grevillei
- Acavus superbus roseolabiatus
- Acavus superbus superbus
