= Phaedusa ceylanica =

Sri Lanka Door Snail

Scientific classification
- Domain: Eukaryota
- Kingdom: Animalia
- Phylum: Mollusca
- Class: Gastropoda
- Order: Stylommatophora
- Family: Clausiliidae
- Genus: Phaedusa
- Species: P. ceylanica

Binomial name
- Phaedusa ceylanica (Benson, 1863)

Species of gastropod

Phaedusa ceylanica is a species of air-breathing land snails, terrestrial pulmonate gastropod mollusks in the family Clausiliidae. This species is endemic to Sri Lanka.
