= Mirus stalix =

Scientific classification
- Domain: Eukaryota
- Kingdom: Animalia
- Phylum: Mollusca
- Class: Gastropoda
- Order: Stylommatophora
- Family: Enidae
- Genus: Mirus
- Species: M. stalix

Binomial name
- Mirus stalix (W. H. Benson, 1863)

Synonyms
- Bulimus stalix W. H. Benson 1863

Species of terrestrial snails

Mirus stalix is a species of air-breathing land snails, a terrestrial pulmonate gastropod in the subfamily Eninae of the family Enidae.

M. stalix are endemic to Sri Lanka.

They were first described in 1863 by British malacologist William Henry Benson.

== Description ==
The length of the shell attains 20 mm (0.79 in), its diameter 7 mm (0.28 in).

(Original description in Latin) The shell is narrowly perforate, oblong-conic, somewhat solid, with obliquely irregularly folded striations and a very densely spirally striated epidermis. It is chestnut-coloured, marked with oblique streaks, while the suture, base, and apex are whitish.

The spire is elongate-conic, with a somewhat blunt apex and a slightly impressed suture, sometimes margined. There are seven slightly convex whorls, the body whorl slightly compressed at the base and barely ascending anteriorly.

The aperture is somewhat oblique, narrowly pear-shaped, chestnut-coloured inside, with a slightly expanded, faintly reflexed, whitish peristome. The margins are distant and not converging, with the columellar margin broad and joined above by an oblique chestnut-coloured callus.
