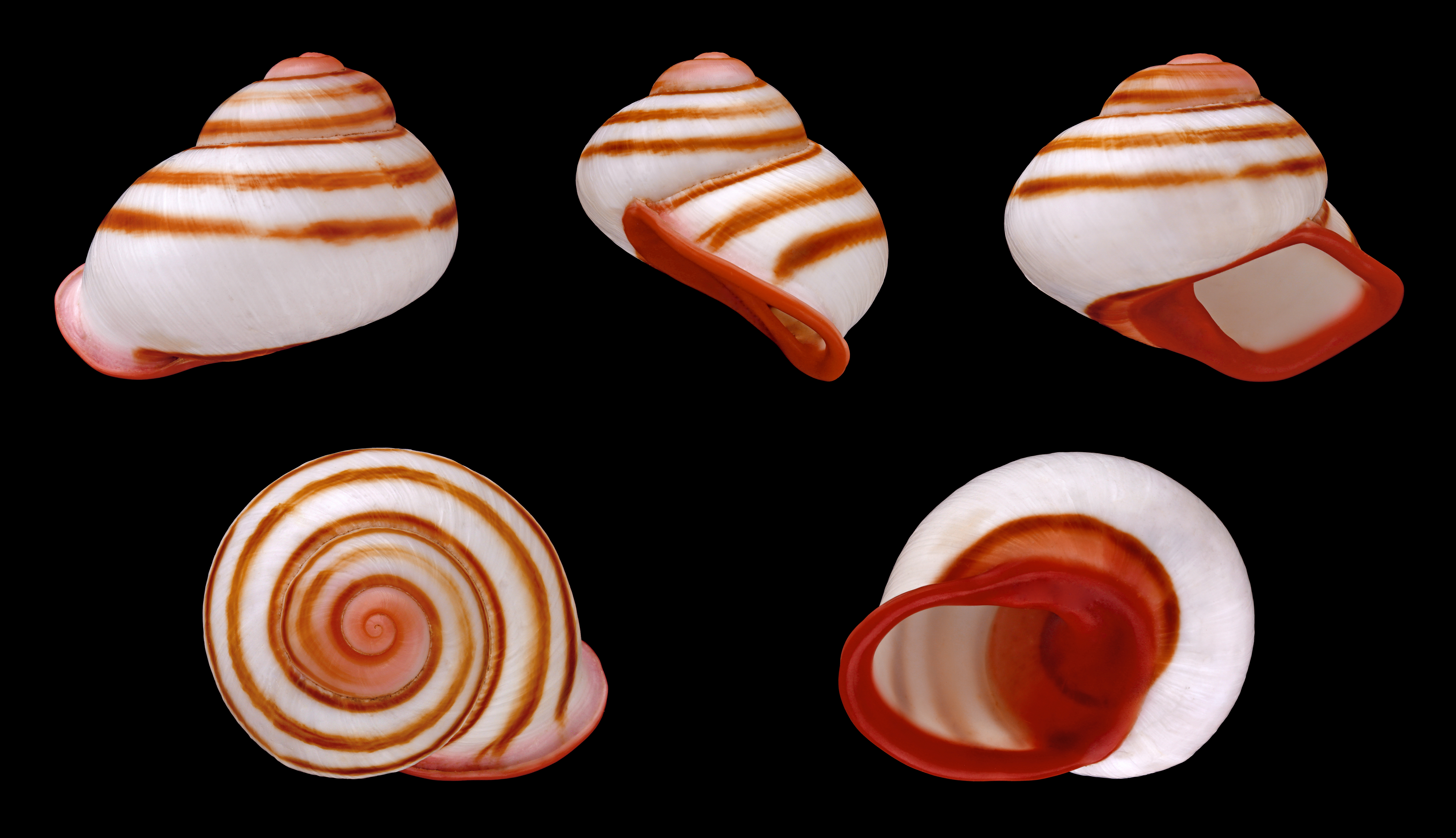
- Five views of a shell of Acavus haemastoma fastuosa (Albers, 1854) from Sri Lanka

Scientific classification
- Kingdom: Animalia
- Phylum: Mollusca
- Class: Gastropoda
- Order: Stylommatophora
- Family: Acavidae
- Genus: Acavus; Montfort, 1810

= Acavus =

Genus of gastropods

Acavus is a genus of air-breathing land snails, terrestrial pulmonate gastropod mollusks in the family Acavidae.

They belongs to group of tree snails that inhabited the ancient continent of Gondwana over 150 million years ago.

These beautiful tree snails are endemic to Sri Lanka. It is present a large intraspecific polymorphism, with the development of various geographical subspecies (among them Acavus phoenix phoenix and Acavus phoenix castaneus).

== Species ==
- Acavus haemastoma (Linnaeus, 1758)
- Acavus phoenix Pfeiffer, 1854
- Acavus superbus Pfeiffer, 1850
