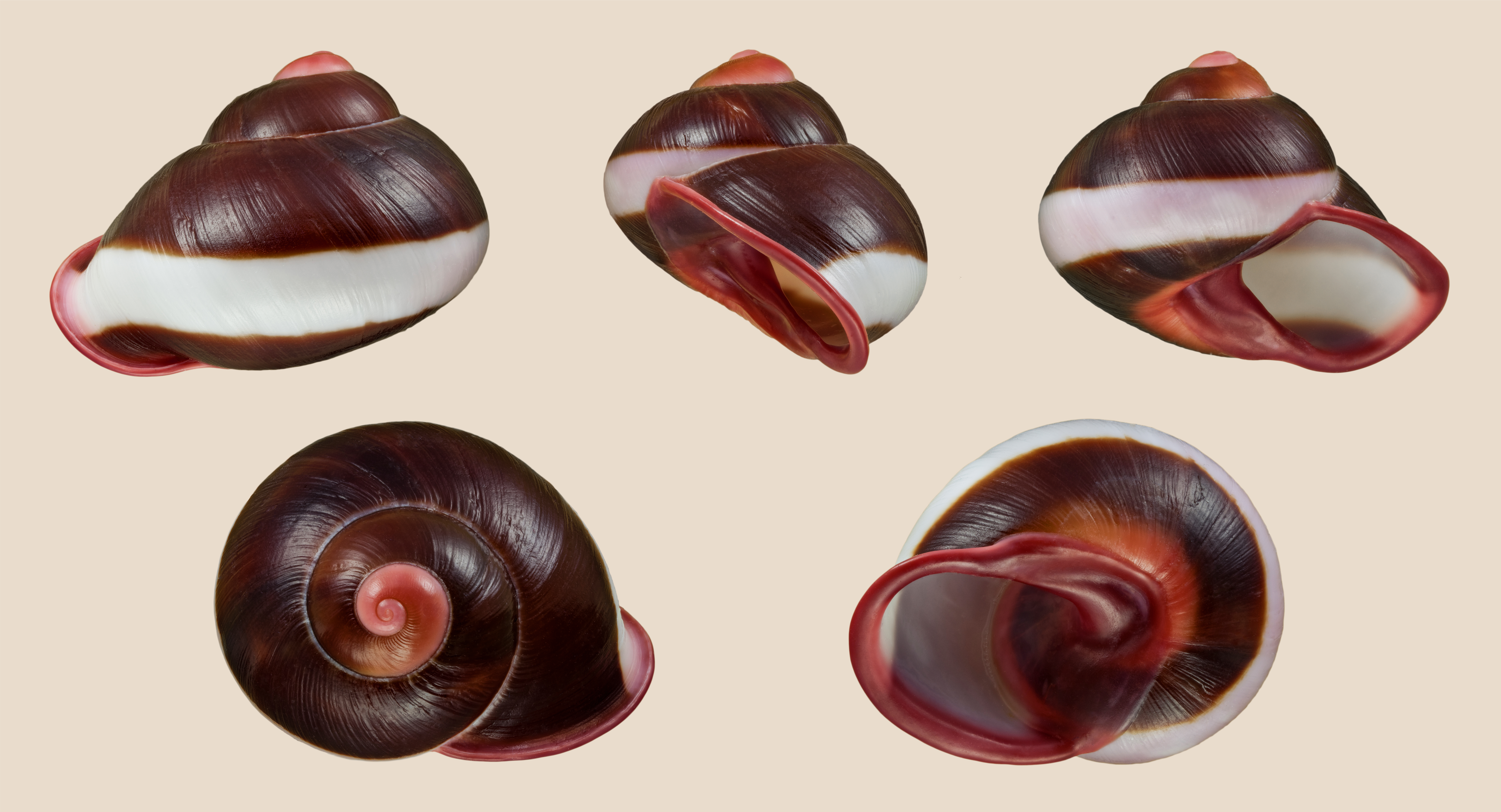
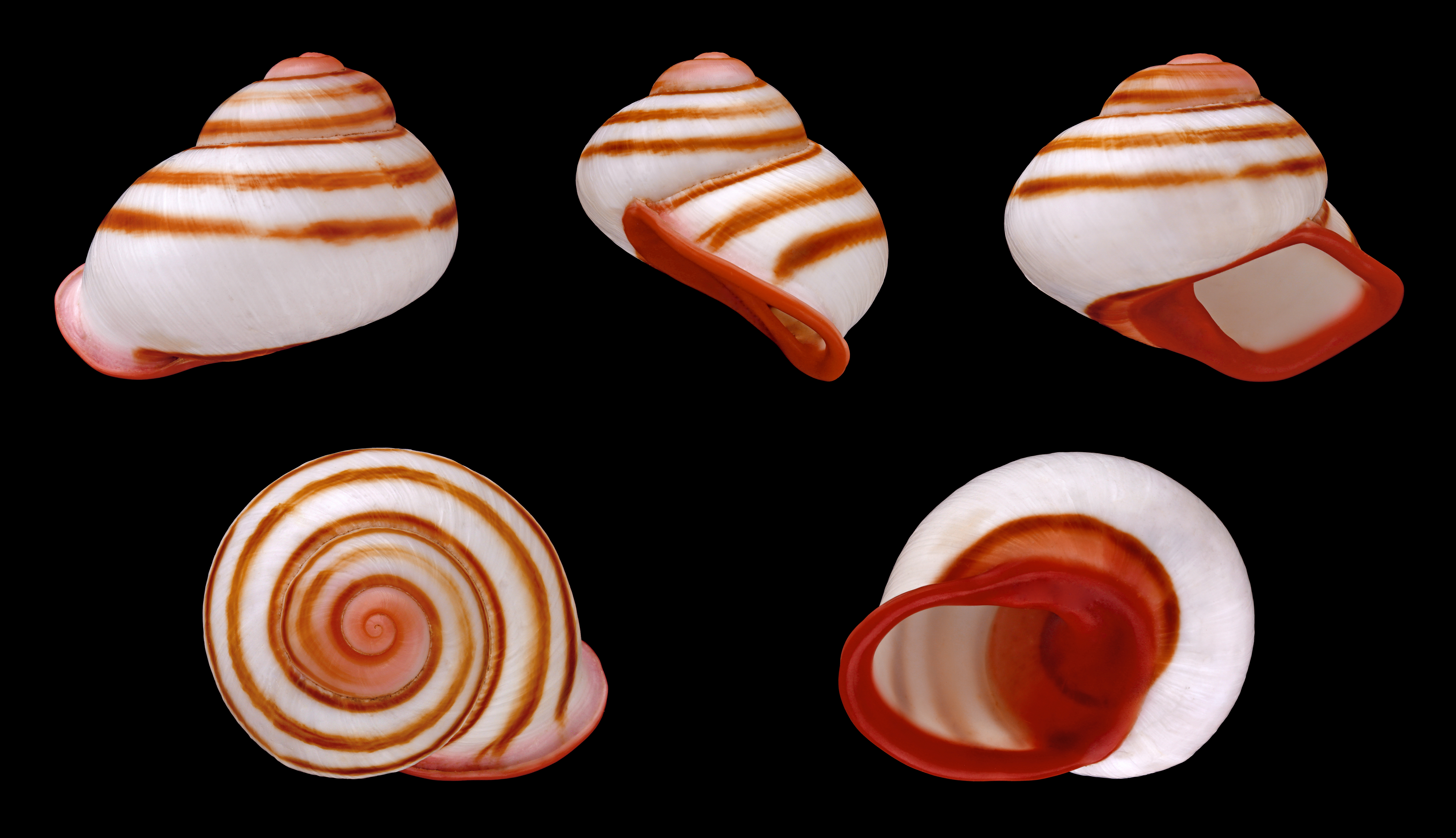
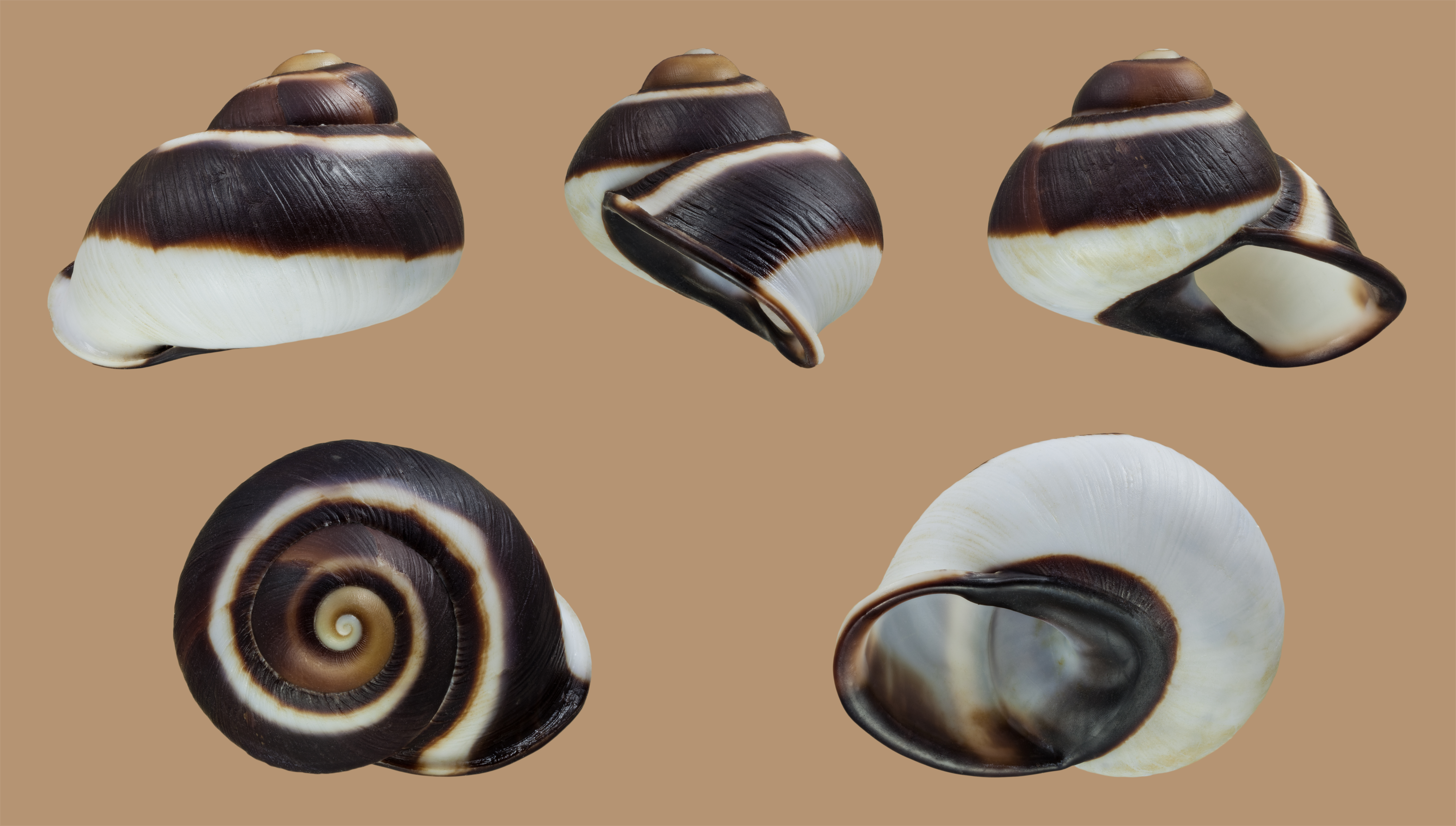
- Shell of Acavus haemastoma haemastoma Shell of Acavus haemastoma fastuosa Shell of Acavus haemastoma melanotragus All shells collected in Sri Lanka.

Scientific classification
- Kingdom: Animalia
- Phylum: Mollusca
- Class: Gastropoda
- Order: Stylommatophora
- Family: Acavidae
- Genus: Acavus
- Species: A. haemastoma

Binomial name
- Acavus haemastoma (Linnaeus, 1758)

= Acavus haemastoma =

Species of gastropod

Acavus haemastoma is a species of air-breathing land snail, terrestrial pulmonate gastropod mollusks in the family Acavidae.

Three subspecies recognized.

== Description ==
Acavus haemastoma has a shell reaching a width of 38–46 mm. These land snails descend to the ground only at night. They feed on rotting fruits. Its shell is rose to dark brown in color, which sometimes white or dark lateral lines can be seen. Body is brown colored.

The species is known to feed on soft tissues of many garden plant fruits, and mosses, lichens as well.

== Distribution ==
This species is endemic to Sri Lanka. It is present in island's rainforest.

== Subspecies ==
- Acavus haemastoma fastuosa
- Acavus haemastoma haemastoma
- Acavus haemastoma melanotragus
