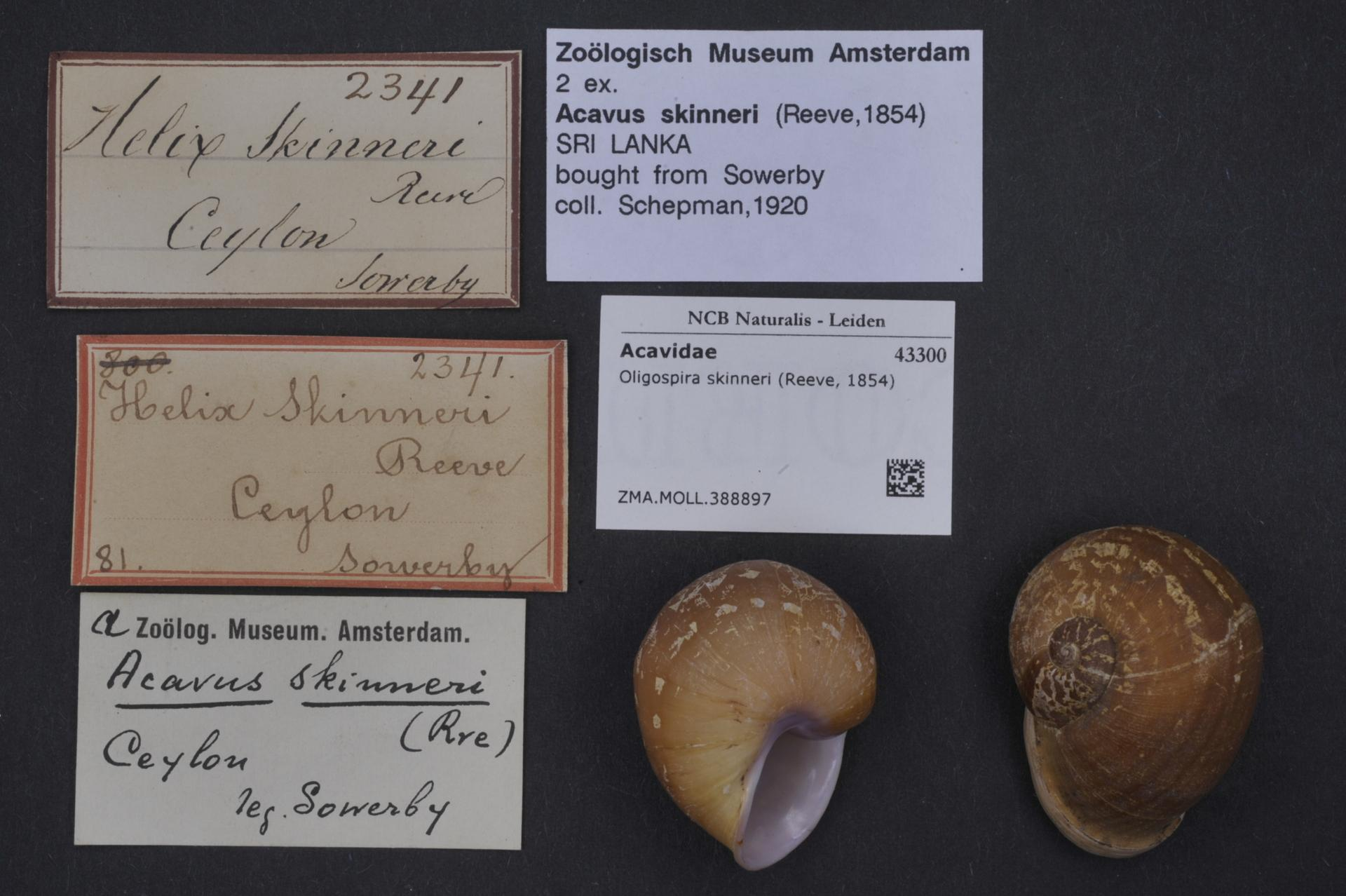

Scientific classification
- Kingdom: Animalia
- Phylum: Mollusca
- Class: Gastropoda
- Order: Stylommatophora
- Family: Acavidae
- Genus: Oligospira
- Species: O. skinneri

Binomial name
- Oligospira skinneri (Reeve, 1854)

Synonyms
- Acavus skinneri Reeve, 1854

= Oligospira skinneri =

Species of gastropod

Oligospira skinneri is a species of air-breathing land snails, terrestrial pulmonate gastropod mollusks in the family Acavidae. It is endemic to Sri Lanka.

== Description ==
Shell is shiny light brown to rosy in color with some small white spots on it. Lip of the shell is meat red. It is named after Major Skinner.
