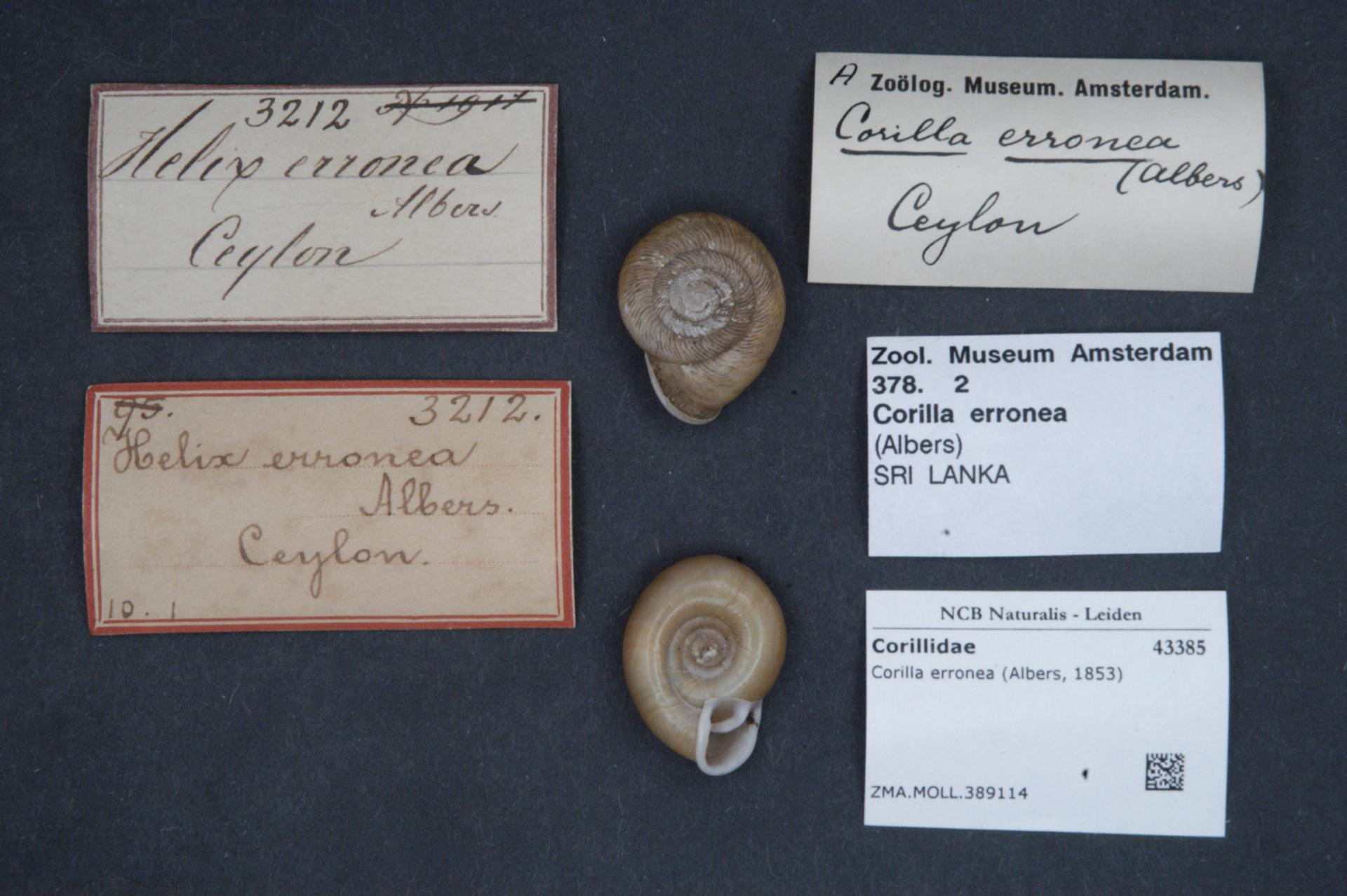
- Corilla erronea shells

Scientific classification
- Kingdom: Animalia
- Phylum: Mollusca
- Class: Gastropoda
- Order: Stylommatophora
- Superfamily: Plectopyloidea
- Family: Corillidae; Pilsbry, 1905

= Corillidae =

Family of gastropods

Corillidae is a family of gastropods in the order Stylommatophora.

== Genera ==
- Corilla Adams & Adams, 1855
