= Wildlife of Sri Lanka =

The wildlife of Sri Lanka includes its flora and fauna and their natural habitats. Sri Lanka has one of the highest rates of biological endemism (16% of the fauna and 23% of flowering plants are endemic).

== Ecological zones ==
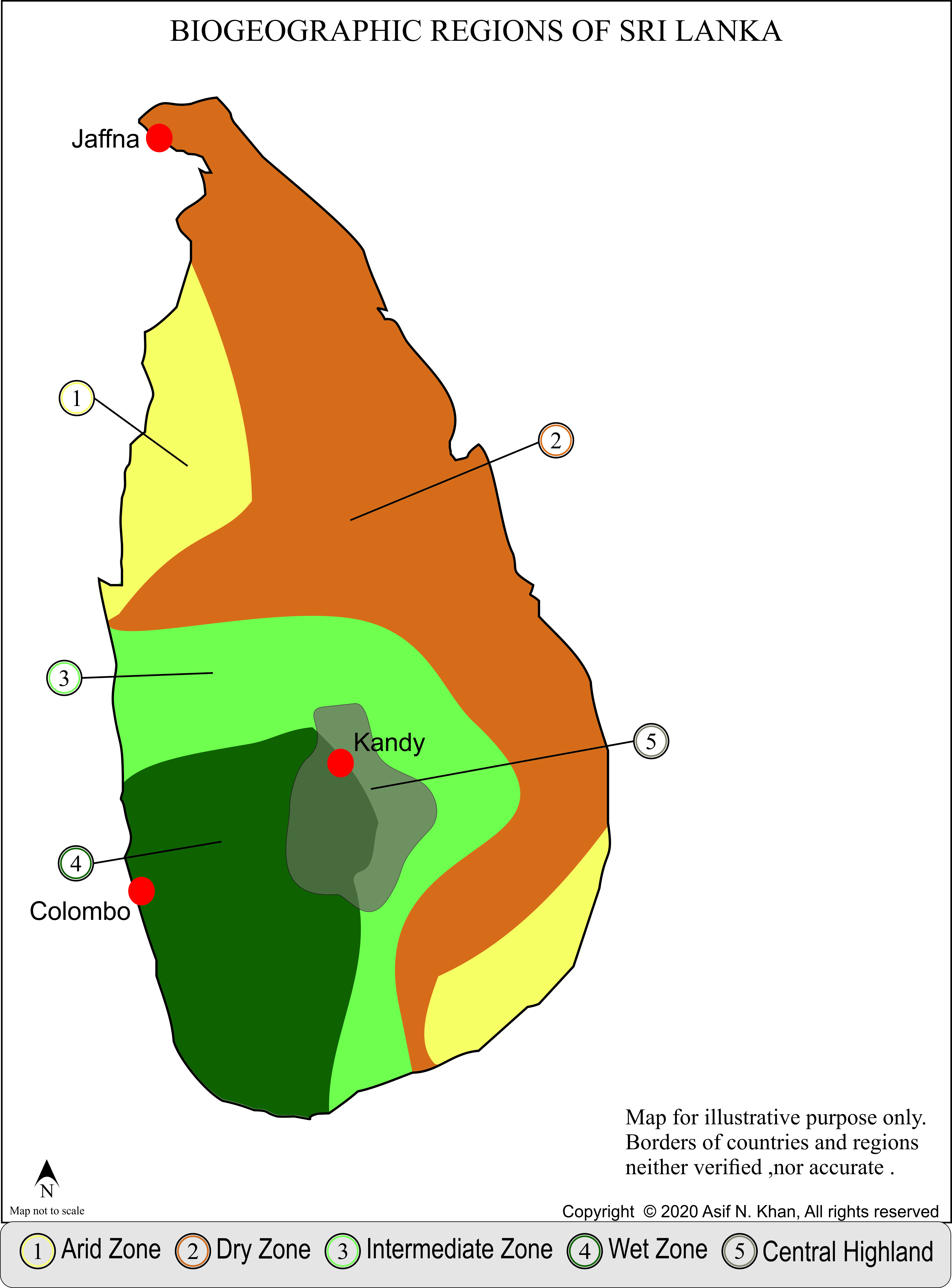
Ecological zones of Sri Lanka

The mountains and the southwestern part of the country, known as the "wet zone", receive ample rainfall (an annual average of 2500 millimeters). Most of the southeast, east, and northern parts of the country comprise the "dry zone", which receives between 1200 and 1900 mm of rain annually.

== Faunal diversity ==
=== Described species of fauna ===
The most recent update on the Sri Lankan biodiversity was the 6th National Report of the Convention on Biological Diversity. This report provided an updated list of species as of the end 2018. However, in 2019, 54 new species were described: including 26 spiders, (14 cellar spiders, 7 jumping spiders, 4 crab spiders and 1 tarantula), 1 scorpion species, 5 mites and ticks, 14 reptiles (13 day geckos and 1 snake), 1 shrub frog, 1 orchid and 6 lichens. Later in 2021, Professors Devaka Weerakoon and Amila Sumanapala released an updated list of taxa as of the end of 2020.

Group	Class	No. of species	Endemic species	Endemism
Vertebrates	Mammalia	135	19	16.8%
	Aves	515	34	11.89%
	Reptilia	243	158	65.33%
	Amphibia	120	107	91.66%
	Freshwater fish	124	58	53.76%
	Marine fish	1,387	0	0%
Invertebrates	Gastropoda	5246
Invertebrates	Insecta	11,144
Invertebrates	Araneae	383	271	70.75%
Invertebrates	Scorpiones	18	7	38.88%
Invertebrates	Crustacea	51	51	100%
Invertebrates	Echinodermata	76	1	100%
Plants	Angiosperms	3,120	904	16.8%
	Bryophyta	575	0	0%
	Pteridophyta and Lycophyta	390+	47	100%
	Jungermanniales	296	0	0%

== Vertebrates ==
=== Mammals ===
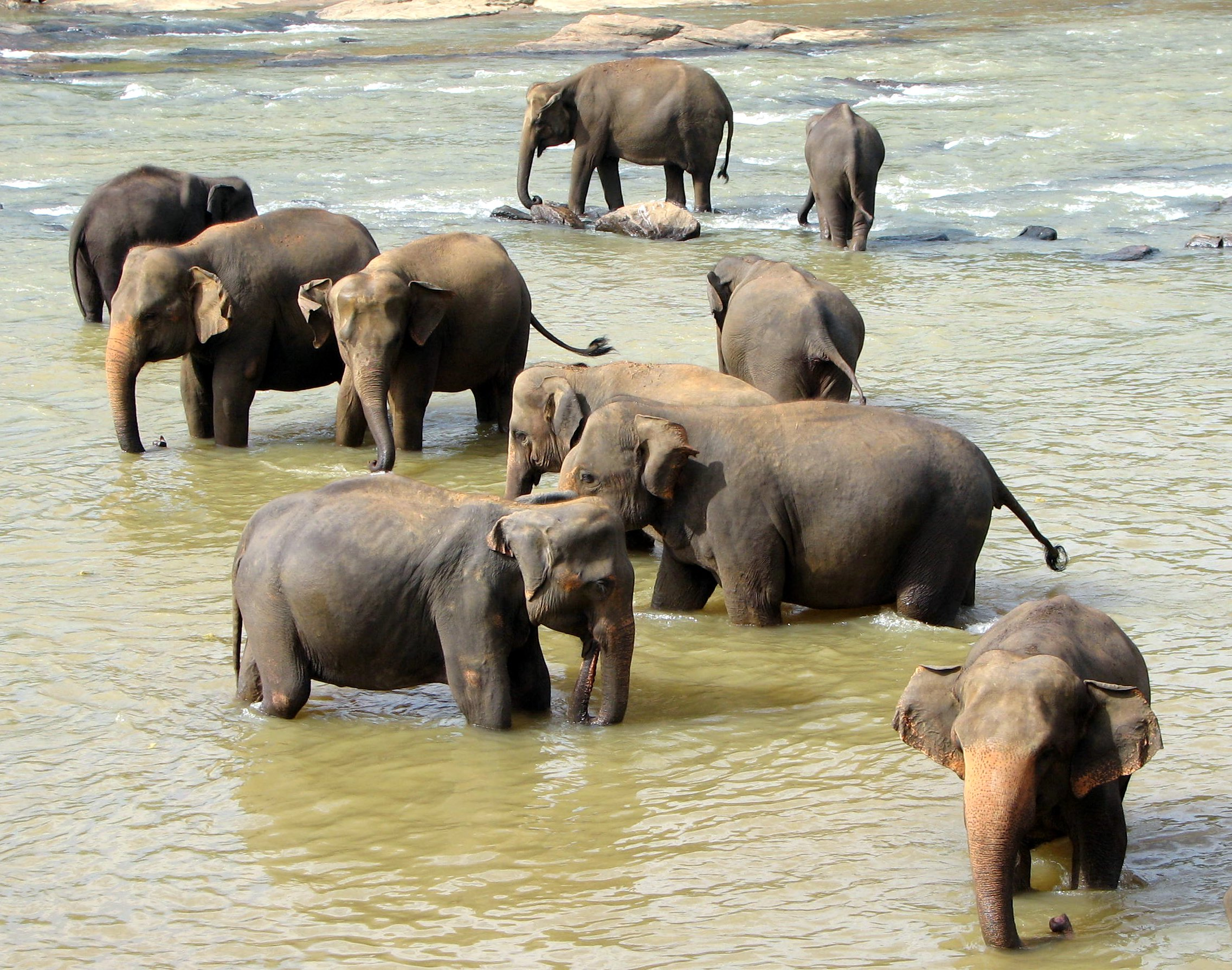
Sri Lankan elephant (Elephas maximus maximus), the largest of the subspecies of Asian elephant

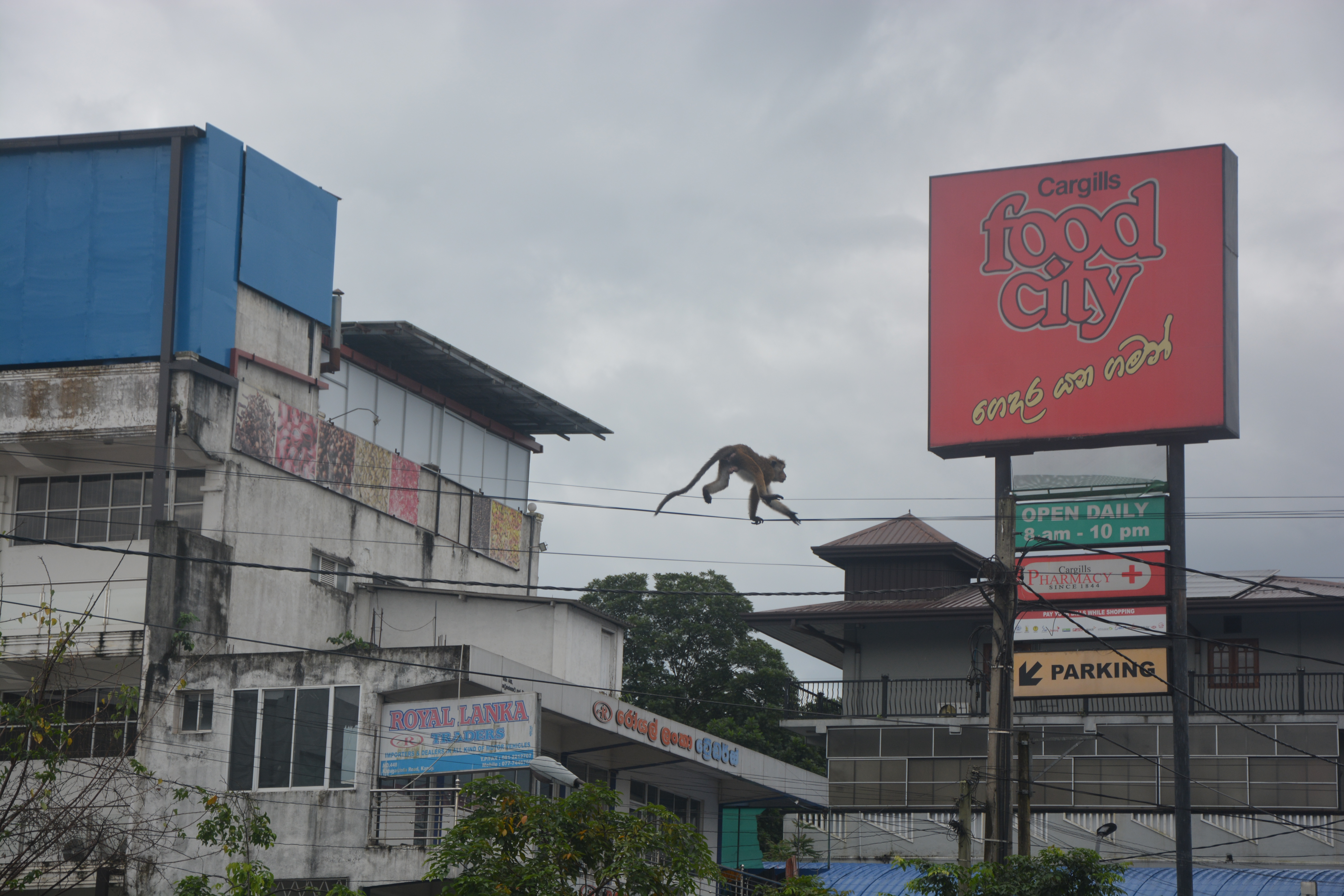
A monkey on wire in the city of Kandy

Sri Lanka is home to roughly 123 species of mammals, 41 of which are threatened (9 critically). 16 of the species are endemic, of which 14 are threatened, including the large sloth bear, the endemic Sri Lanka leopard, the Sri Lankan elephant and the sambar. Bats have the highest amount of species (out of 200 mammalian orders), with 30 species. Sri Lanka's surrounding waters are home to 28 species of Cetaceans.

=== Reptiles ===
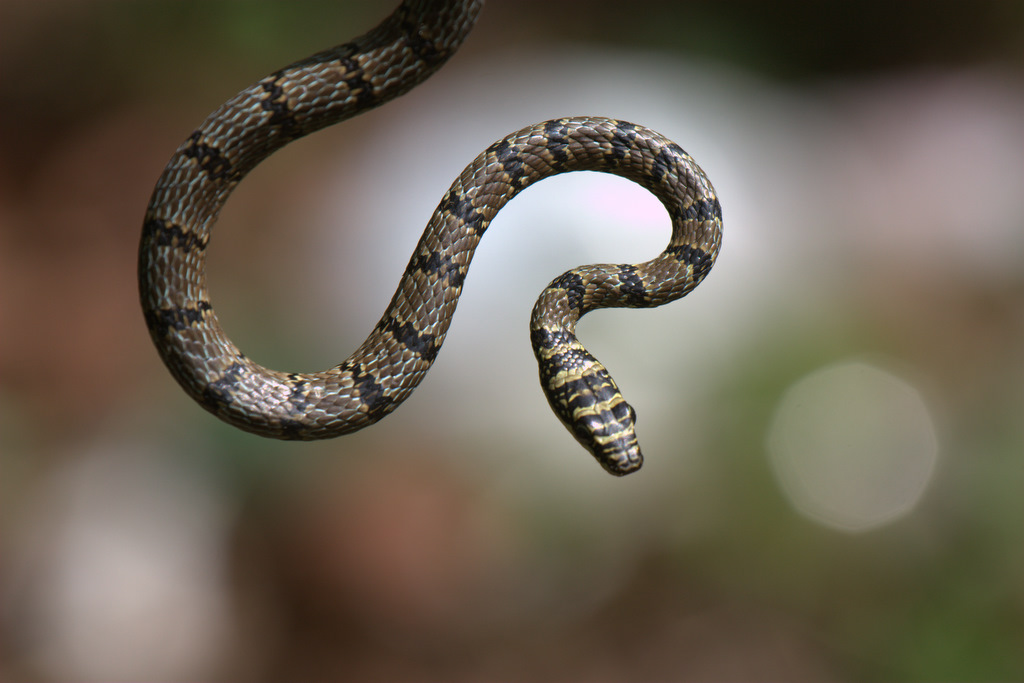
Chrysopelea taprobanica - once endemic, but now found in India as well

Sri Lanka currently contains 185 species of reptiles, of which 60 are threatened and 115 are endemic. Most of the reptiles are snakes and the largest two are the mugger crocodile and saltwater crocodile.

Flooding has led to increased human-crocodile conflict around the Nilwala River, with crocodiles often becoming trapped as floodwaters recede. Such floods are becoming exacerbated by climate change.

=== Amphibians ===
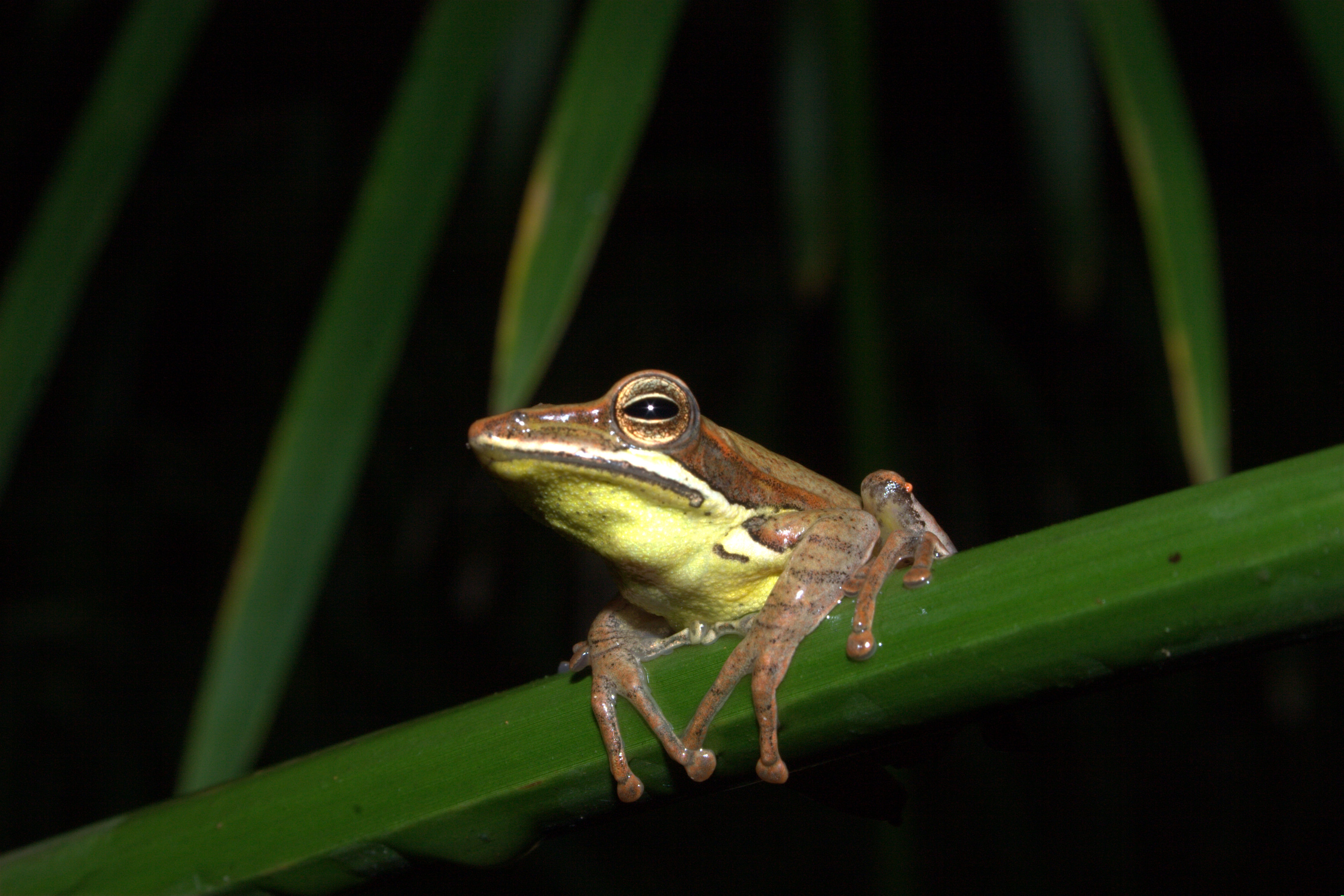
Taruga eques - an endemic amphibian

Sri Lanka has one of the richest diversity of amphibians in the world, containing 122 species of amphibians up to January 2019 with many recent discoveries, with 112 endemic species.

=== Birds ===
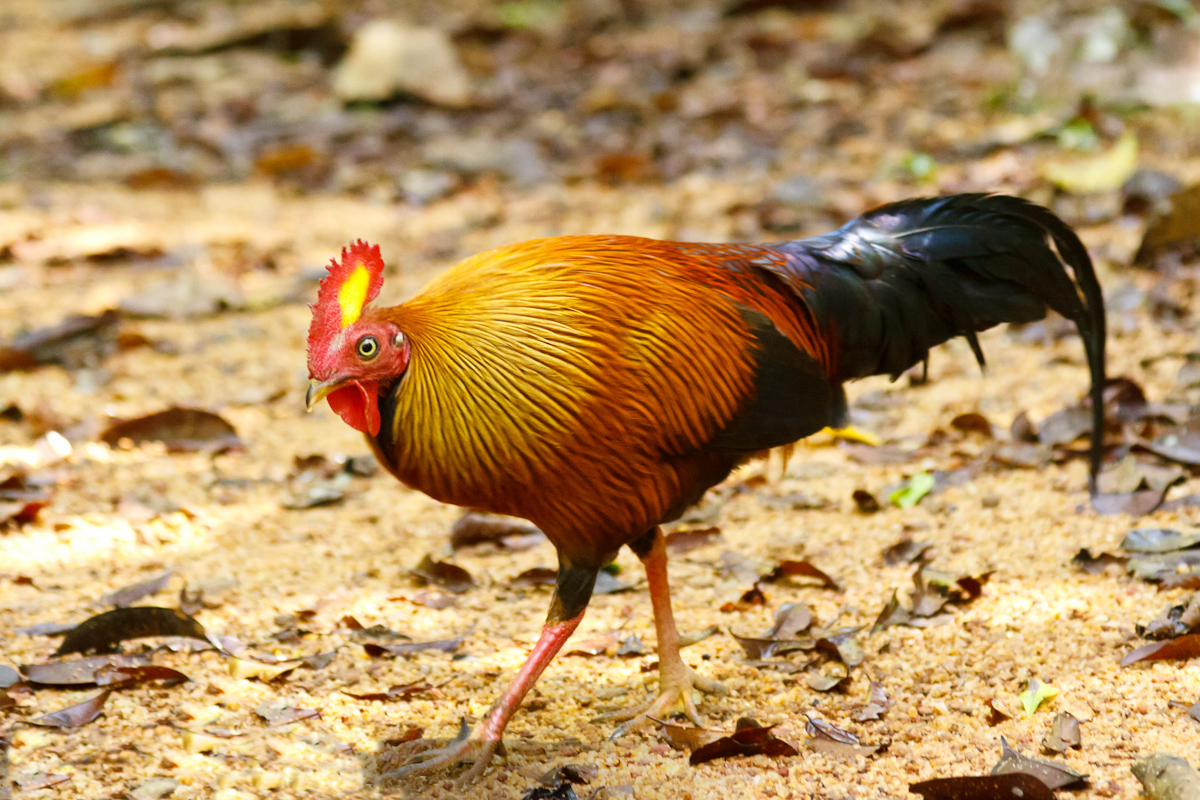
The national bird, Sri Lanka junglefowl (Gallus lafayetii), is endemic.

Sri Lanka is home to 227 species of birds (though some past estimates put it as high as 486), 46 of which are threatened (10 critically).

=== Fish ===
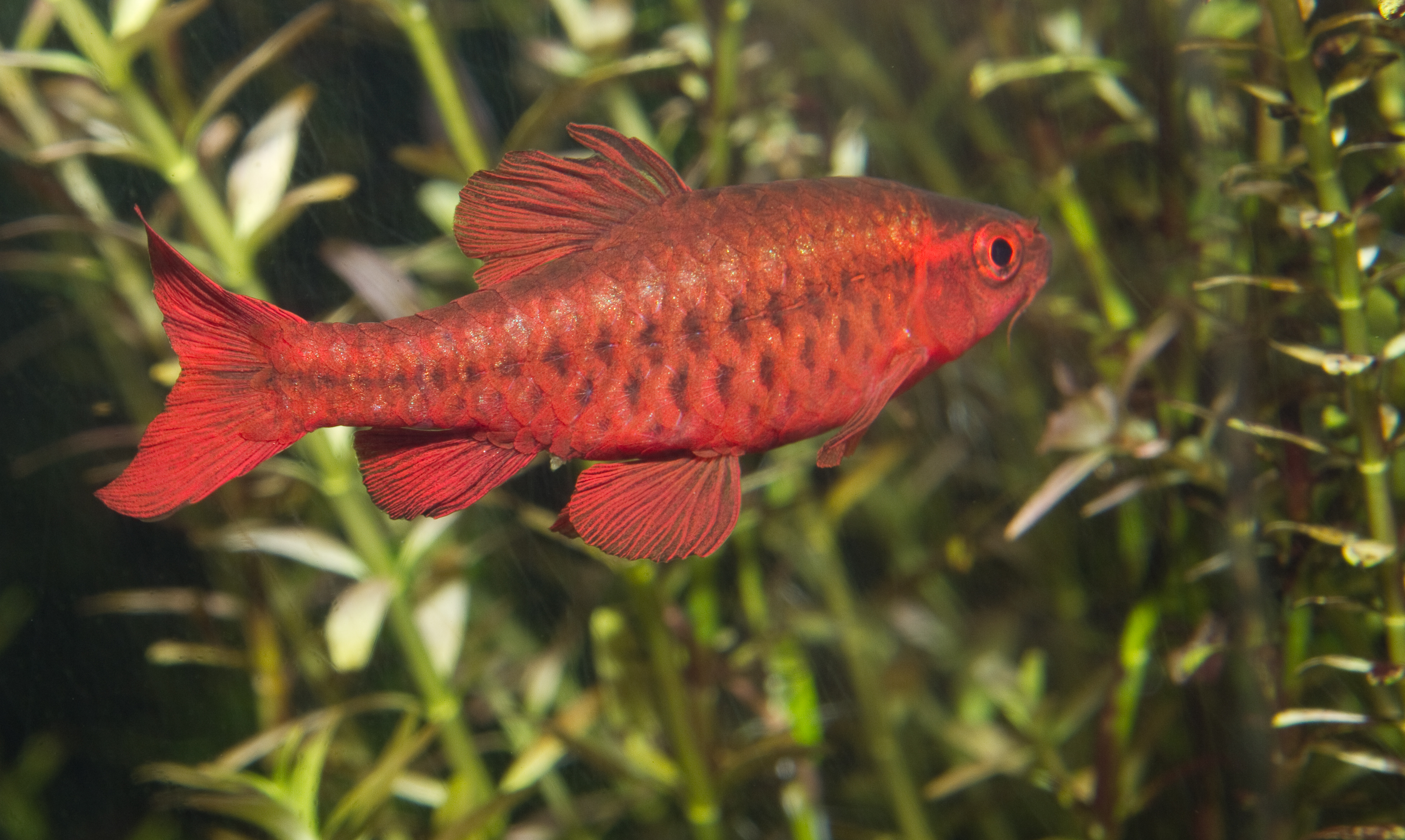
Cherry barb (Puntius titteya) is a tropical fish which is native to Sri Lanka, but introduced populations are established in Mexico and Colombia.

Sri Lanka contains 93 species of freshwater fish, of which 50 are endemic. 28 species are categorized as threatened by the IUCN. There are 8 species of brackish water fish that also come to freshwater, and 24 introduced exotic fish species.

== Insects ==
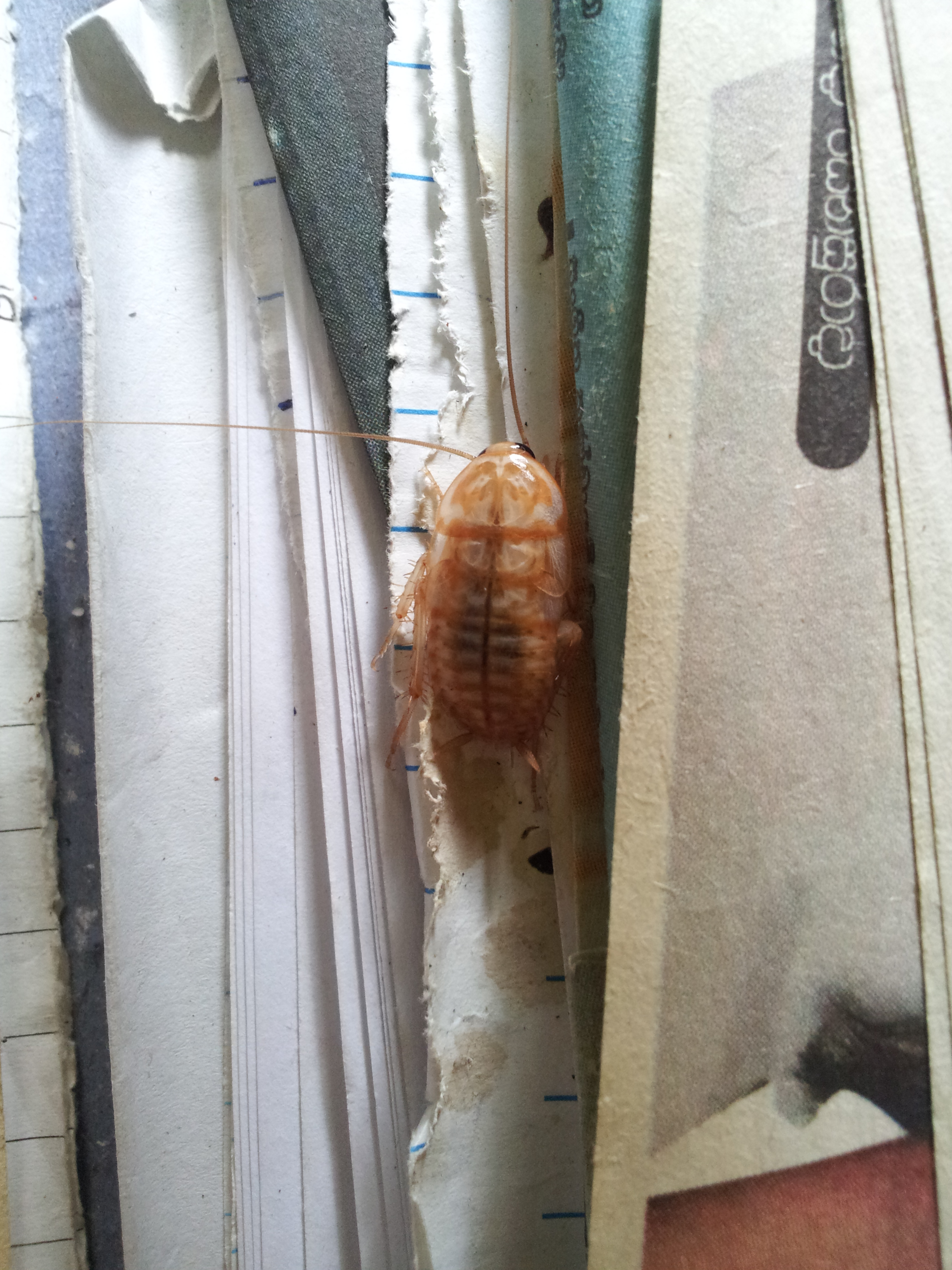
Albino cockroach, of the order Blattodea

Insects belonging to all 32 orders except Grylloblattodea have been recorded from Sri Lanka.

=== Major insects ===
Coleoptera, which is the largest order of insects, is the largest in Sri Lanka with 3,033 documented species. Lepidopterans, moths and butterflies, have the second largest number of species in Sri Lanka. 245 butterflies species are recorded, of which 24 are endemic to the island. 1695 species of moths are also found, but the endemism is unknown.

Hymenopterans, which includes ants, bees, wasps contribute to the third largest insect order in Sri Lanka. Sri Lanka is home to 181 species of ants that included to 61 genera and 10 subfamilies. One endemic genus Aneuretus is also included to the list. There are about 70,000 species of bees of order Hymenoptera in the world with nearly 450 genera and 7 families. Out of them, Sri Lanka comprises 148 species in 38 genera and 4 families.

True flies and mosquitoes belong to the order Diptera, of which there are many in Sri Lanka. There are more than 1,341 dipterans found in the island, which makes it the fourth largest insect order. About 131 species of mosquitoes, in 16 genera, are described. Though they are primary vectors of many human diseases, the majority of mosquitoes in Sri Lanka are harmless to humans and livestock.

=== Minor insects ===
The exact species for other orders is still not classified and documented. Walker in 1861, listed 2,007 species belongs to 9 orders and Haly on 1890 identified 1,510 beetle species from Sri Lanka. However, after many publications from many foreign entomologists, two Sri Lankan entomologists, Anura Wijesekara and D. P. Wijesinghe documented 11,144 insect species belongs to 30 orders from Sri Lanka in 2003.

Damselflies are categorized in suborder Zygoptera and dragonflies are in suborder Anisoptera. There are 121 species within 13 families in Sri Lanka. 59 species are endemic. Hubbard and co-workers documented 46 species in 8 families of order Ephemeroptera. Henneman in 2002 recorded 69 species in order Orthoptera. He also collected few specimen of order Phasmatodea around central hills. 66 species of order Blattodea are found, but not taxonomic evidences. Few species of the order Mantodea were studied by Henry in 1931. Clear documentation of the species within Dermaptera can be found, which was initiated by Burr (1901) and Brindle (1972). Within the termite infraorder Isoptera, 56 species are recorded. In 1913, Green compiled a concise catalogue for termites in Sri Lanka.

Only 4 species of order Embioptera are recorded. In the order Psocoptera, two subfamilies, Epipsocidae and Pseudocaeciliidae have been studied. Information about species of the orders Thysanoptera, Neuroptera, Mecoptera, and Siphonaptera is very thin and more studies are required. Only the family Coniopterygidae of Neuroptera has been studied in 1982.

Sri Lanka is known to be home to 794 species of Hemipterans. Detailed work of Sri Lankan hemipterans are recorded in the book Catalogue of Hemiptera of Sri Lanka. Sri Lanka comprises 74 species in 46 genera and 6 families of aphids within the order Hemiptera. 2 endemic aphid species are found on Sri Lanka. Checklists on orders Trichoptera and Strepsiptera exist, but more recent work is needed.

== Crustaceans ==
=== Freshwater crabs ===
All 51 species along with 5 genera in the family Gecarcinucidae are endemic to Sri Lanka. 98% of those crabs are IUCN categorized as threatened, endangered or critically endangered.

=== Isopods ===
Isopods occur abundantly in the sea, freshwater and land. They typically flattened dorsoventrally and mostly scavengers. Sri Lanka harbors 92 species of isopods of 53 genera in 23 families.

=== Mangrove crabs ===
The exact number of species around mangroves and estuaries within coastal marine regions is not clear, but during research on diversity of mangrove crabs in Kadolkele, Negombo, five species were identified, with two new species. Most marine crabs are much larger and are often caught in fishing nets. They are edible with high protein. Some of marine edible crabs from Sri Lanka are:

- Charybdis natator
- Episesarma versicolor
- Metopograpsus messor
- Metopograpsus thukuhar
- Neosarmatium smithi
- Perisesarma guttatum
- Portunus armatus
- Portunus sanguinolentus
- Scylla serrata
- Thalamita crenata

== Molluscs ==
There are over 246 land gastropods of Sri Lanka, of which 83% are endemic. Sub class Pulmonata consists of 159 species within 23 families and subclass Prosobranchia by 88 species in four families. Five land snail genera, Ravana, Ratnadvipia, Acavus, Oligospira and Aulopoma are endemic to Sri Lanka with 14 species in them. Thirteen more genera such as Ruthvenia, Thysanota, Cryptozona, Euplecta, Mariaella, Eurychlamys, Corilla, Beddomea, Trachia, Leptopomoides, Micraulax, Tortulosa and Nicida are only in the Western Ghats of India and Sri Lanka. 18 species are recorded as exotic species and agricultural pests.

Fauna of Sri Lanka also include freshwater snails. The number of marine molluscs of Sri Lanka is not known, though there were about 240 species listed in 2006.

== Myriapods ==
The diversity of subphylum Myriapoda, is not well studied in Sri Lanka. The facts and checklists of these creatures date back to Newport in 1845, which is the first known study about centipedes. Many centipede works are more than a century old. Millipede diversity is much better studied. Currently, 104 species of millipedes and 19 species of centipedes are known from Sri Lanka.

== Arachnids ==
=== Spiders ===
The detailed work on Sri Lankan spiders was through the Checklist of Spiders of South Asia Including 2006 Revision of Indian Spider Checklist by Manju Siliwal and Sanjay Molur. This checklist provided all the described spider species of South Asia and part of South-East Asia as well.

According to this checklist, Sri Lanka has 501 species of spiders belonging to 45 families and 213 genera. Out of these, 250 are endemic with 22 endemic genera.

==== Ant-mimicking spiders ====
Spiders in genus Myrmarachne are commonly called ant-mimicking spiders. They are grouped in the family Salticidae of order Araneae. Out of more than 100 species described, 12 are found in Sri Lanka. Three species were described in 2015.

==== Tarantulas ====
There are 8 species of tarantula that have been recorded in Sri Lanka. When considering with the Indian subcontinent, 15 species of Poecilotheria are recorded from both countries; 7 endemics from India and 7 endemics from Sri Lanka. 1 species is found in both countries.

=== Scorpions ===
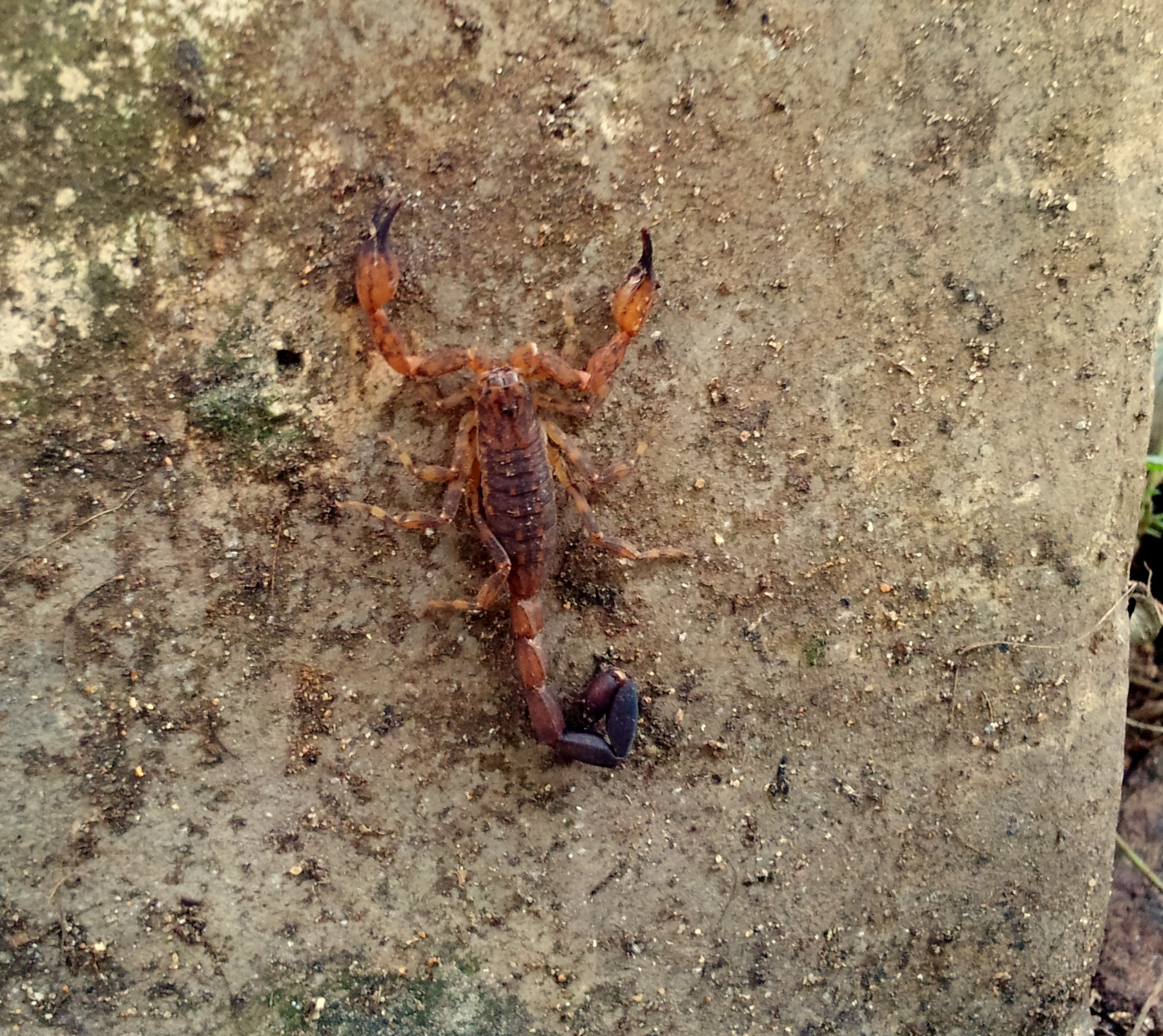

There are 18 species of scorpions in Sri Lanka. Out of these 18, 7 are endemic. In addition, 4 subspecies of the 9 non-endemic species are also endemic to Sri Lanka.

According to 2014 research, 47 species of pseudoscorpions have been identified in Sri Lanka. Out of this 43 species, 20 species are endemic to Sri Lanka.

The diversity of lesser arachnids within Sri Lanka is not extensive. Some observations on particular species have been undertaken by some local and foreign scientists. According to them, there are 3 species of whip spiders, 4 species of whip scorpions, and 21 species of daddy longlegs found in Sri Lanka.

=== Ticks and mites ===
Ticks belong to superfamily Ixodoidea of the order Parasitiformes. 27 species of ixodid ticks, commonly called hard ticks, of the family Ixodidae belonging to 9 genera have been reported from Sri Lanka.

=== Echinoderms ===
Echinoderms belong to the phylum Echinodermata. They are deuterostomes that are closely related to chordates. In Sri Lanka, there are 39 regular echinoids belonging to 28 genera, 9 families, and 5 orders. Besides, there are 21 irregular echinoid species belonging to 4 orders, 9 families and 15 genera in Sri Lanka.

== Flora ==
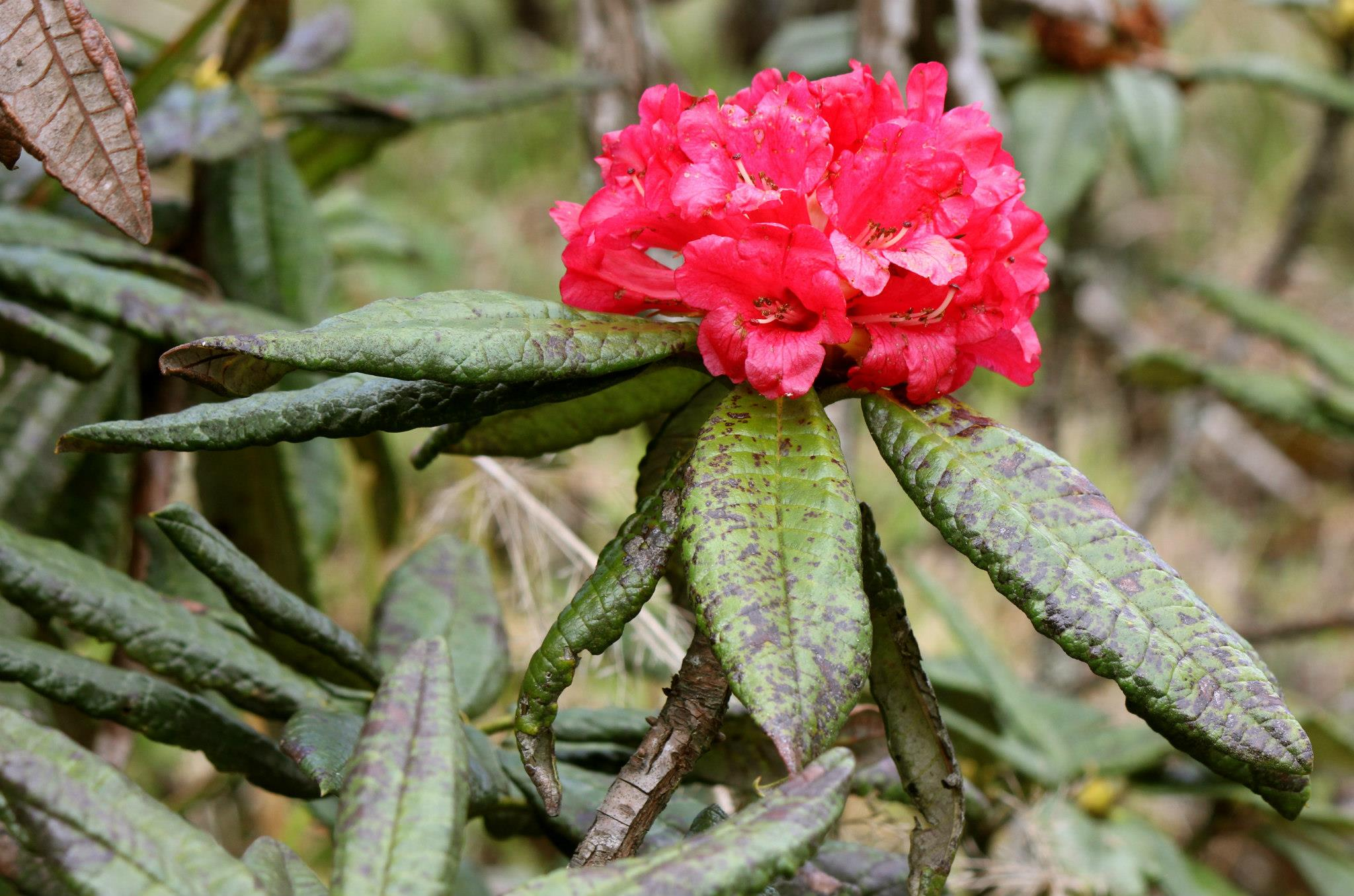
Maha rath mala (Rhododendron arboreum ssp. zeylanicum) is a rare subspecies of Rhododendron arboreum found in Central Highlands of Sri Lanka.

Diversity and endemism of plants in Sri Lanka are quite high. There are 3,210 flowering plants belonging to 1,052 genera. 916 species and 18 genera are endemic to the island. Additionally, all but one of the island's more than 55 dipterocarps are confined to Sri Lanka. Although not lately assessed, Sri Lanka's ferns are estimated at 350 species. Diversity, richness, and endemism across all taxa groups are much higher in the wet zone than in the dry zone. Wet zone, which accounts for only a quarter of Sri Lanka's land area, harbours 88 percent of the flowering plants, and 95 percent of country's flowering plant endemics. The natural forests of Sri Lanka are categorized into eight types.

Loxococcus, a monotypic genus consisting of the sole species Loxococcus rupicola, is the only palm (Arecaceae) genus that is endemic to Sri Lanka. A new Gesneriaceae species Henckelia wijesundarae, endemic to Hiniduma, Galle, was described and illustrated in 2016 by Subhani Ranasinghe et al.

In 2020, a species of orchid Gastrodia gunatillekeorum was described from Sinharaja. In the same year, several other plants were first described: one species of seagrass: Halophila major and six species of liverworts; Lejeunea sordida, Leptolejeunea subdentata, Spruceanthus polymorphus, Frullania udarii, Heteroscyphus turgidus and Fuscocephaloziopsis lunulifolia. With that, the total number of leafy liverwort species in Sri Lanka increased to 296 in 63 genera. In the meantime, a species of fungus, Helvella crispa, was also identified from Sri Lanka.

== Lichens ==
Sri Lankan environmentalist, Dr. Gothamie Weerakoon has discovered 51 new varieties of lichens endemic to Sri Lanka, of which 8 were found in the Knuckles Mountain Range. While Dr. Udeni Jayalal et al. found 2 new lichens from the Horton Plains in 2012, Anzia mahaeliyensis and Anzia flavotenuis. Currently, more than 400 species of lichens are found in Sri Lanka.

== See also ==
- Wildlife conservation
- Wildlife of South Asia
- List of freshwater fauna of Sri Lanka

== Bibliography ==
- Channa N. B. Bambaradeniya, ed. (2006). Fauna of Sri Lanka: Status of Taxonomy, Research and Conservation. Colombo, Sri Lanka: The World Convservation Union. p. 308. ISBN 955-8177-51-2.
- Herat, T. R. Somaratna, S. & Pradeepa, (1998). Common Vegetables of Sri Lanka. NARESA, Sri Lanka.
- Herat, T. R. (2005). Tentative Keys to the Families & Genera of Pteridophytes of Sri Lanka. Self published.
- Herat, T. R. & Ratnayake, P. (2005). An Illustrated Guide to the Fern Flora of Knuckles Conservation Area Sri Lanka. Self published.
- Herat, T. R. (2005). Endemic Flowering Plants, Part I: A Checklist & an Index to A Revised Handbook to the Flora of Ceylon. Self published.
- Herat, T. R. (2007). Endemic Flowering Plants of Sri Lanka Part II: A, Index to the Distribution of Plants with Localities. Environmental Ministry Colombo.
- Herat, T. R. (2007). Endemic Flowering Plants of Sri Lanka Part II: B, Index to the Distribution within Agro Ecological Zones. Environmental Ministry Colombo.
- Herat, T. R. & Herat, A. U. (2008). Index to the Distribution of Ferns & Fern-Allies within the Administrative Districts of Sri Lanka. Self published.
