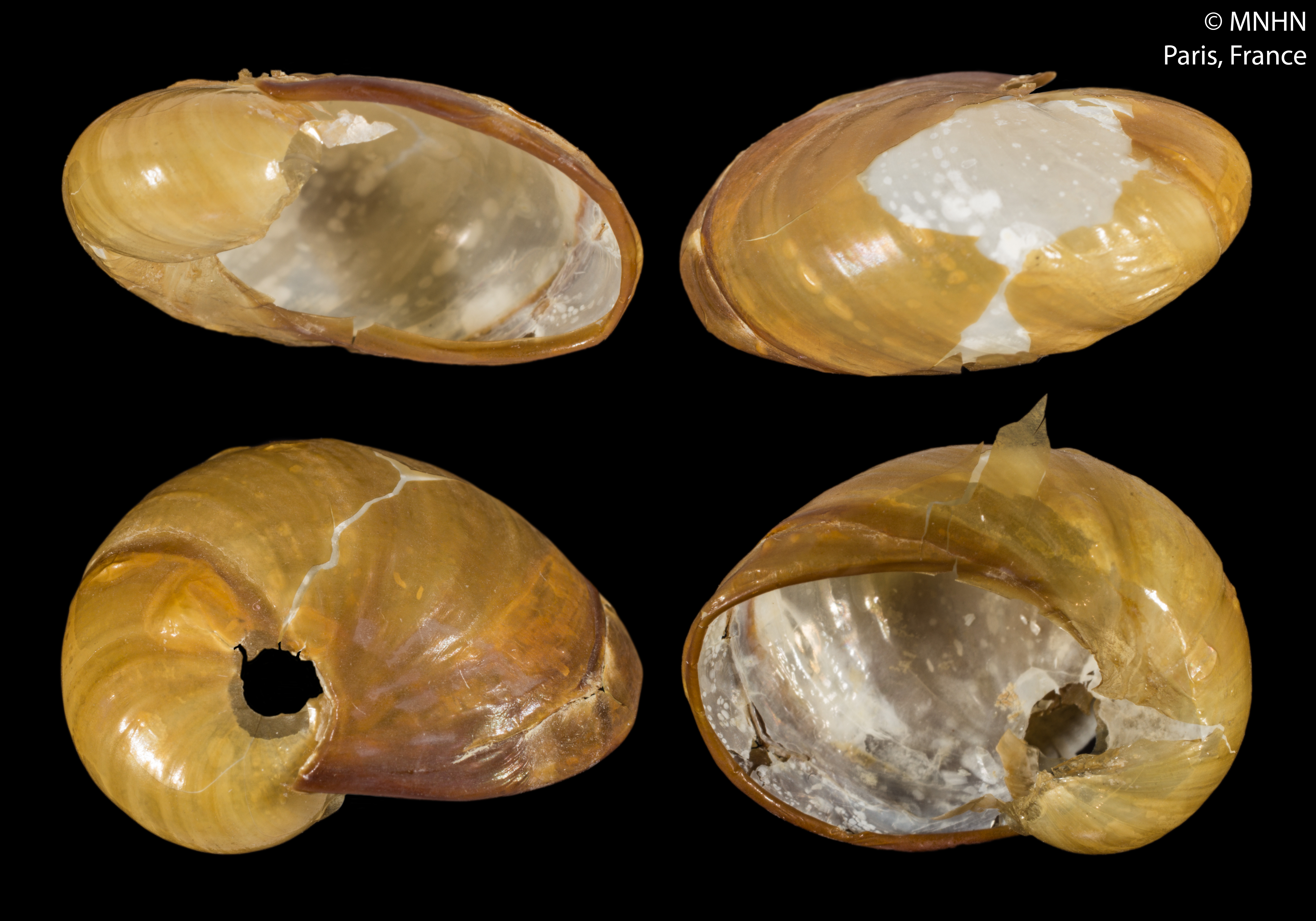
- Shell of Megaustenia rondonyi (syntype at MNHN, Paris)

Scientific classification
- Kingdom: Animalia
- Phylum: Mollusca
- Class: Gastropoda
- Order: Stylommatophora
- Infraorder: Limacoidei
- Superfamily: Helicarionoidea
- Family: Ariophantidae
- Genus: Megaustenia; Cockerell, 1912

Type species
- Vitrina praestans Gould, 1843

Synonyms
- Cryptosoma Theobald, 1857 (Invalid: junior homonym of Cryptosoma Milne-Edwards, 1837 [Crustacea]; Megaustenia is a replacement name); Helicarion (Cryptosoma) Theobald, 1857

= Megaustenia =

Genus of gastropods

Megaustenia is a genus of air-breathing land snails, terrestrial pulmonate gastropod mollusks in the subfamily Ariophantinae of the family Ariophantidae.

== Species ==
- Megaustenia annhiae (Thach & F. Huber, 2017)
- Megaustenia balansai (Mabille, 1889)
- Megaustenia birmanica (Philippi, 1847)
- Megaustenia cochinchinensis (Morelet, 1866)
- Megaustenia fragilis (Möllendorff, 1901)
- Megaustenia heliciformis (L. Pfeiffer, 1855)
- Megaustenia huberi (Thach, 2016)
- Megaustenia imperator (A. Gould, 1859)
- Megaustenia inusitata (Godwin-Austen, 1898)
- Megaustenia khyoungensis (Godwin-Austen, 1888)
- Megaustenia malefica (J. Mabille, 1887)
- Megaustenia messageri (Bavay & Dautzenberg, 1909)
- Megaustenia praestans (Gould, 1843)
- Megaustenia rondonyi (H. Fischer, 1898)
- Megaustenia siamensis (Haines, 1855)
- Megaustenia tongkingensis (Möllendorff, 1901)
- Megaustenia unguiculus (Morelet, 1865)

Species brought into synonymy

- Megaustenia russeola (Morelet, 1865): synonym of Durgella russeola (Morelet, 1865) (unaccepted combination)
- Megaustenia siamense (Haines, 1855): synonym of Megaustenia siamensis (Haines, 1855) (incorrect gender of species name)
- Megaustenia tecta (Souleyet, 1852): synonym of Macrochlamys tecta (Souleyet, 1852)
