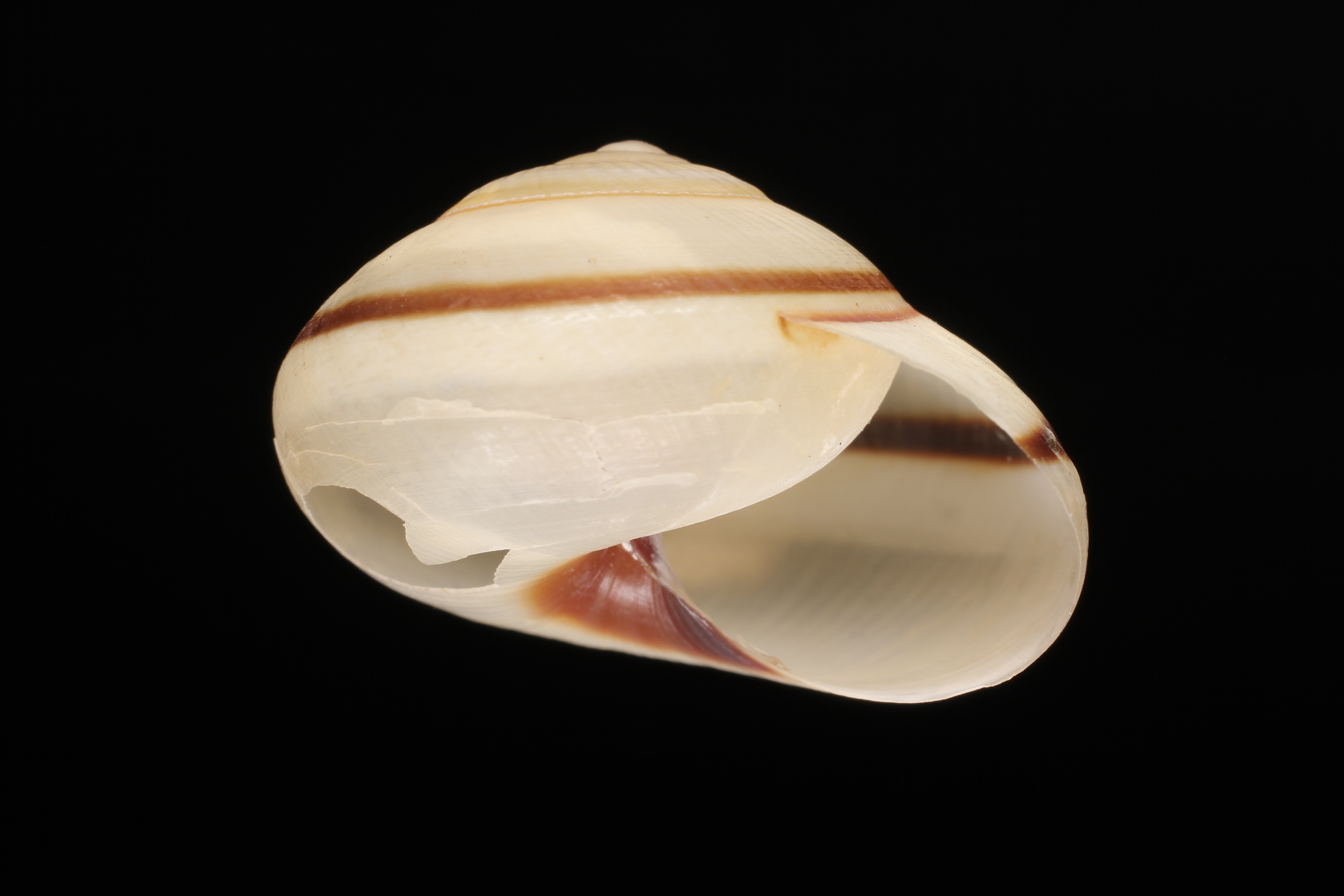
- Shell of Xesta srijohnabbasae (holotype at MNHN, Paris)

Scientific classification
- Kingdom: Animalia
- Phylum: Mollusca
- Class: Gastropoda
- Order: Stylommatophora
- Infraorder: Limacoidei
- Superfamily: Helicarionoidea
- Family: Ariophantidae
- Genus: Xesta; Albers, 1850

Type species
- Helix citrina Linnaeus, 1758

Species
- See text

Synonyms
- Ariophanta (Xesta) Albers, 1850; Corneoxesta Iredale, 1941 (junior synonym); Helix (Nanina) Gray, 1834 (superseded combination); Helix (Xesta) Albers, 1850; Nanina Gray, 1834 (junior homonym of Nanina Risso, 1826); Nanina (Xesta) Albers, 1850 (original rank); Naninia Zilch, 1959 (intentional emendation of Nanina Gray, 1834; objective junior synonym of Xesta Albers, 1850 (identical type species)); Naninia G. B. Sowerby I, 1842 (invalid: incorrect subsequent spelling of Nanina Gray, 1834); Xesta (Corneoxesta) Iredale, 1941 (junior synonym); Zonites (Nanina) Gray, 1834

= Xesta =

Genus of gastropods

Xesta is a genus of air-breathing land snails, terrestrial pulmonate gastropod mollusks in the subfamily Ariophantinae of the family Ariophantidae.

== Species ==
- Xesta aulica (L. Pfeiffer, 1854)
- Xesta citrina (Linnaeus, 1758)
- Xesta comorensis (Morelet, 1881)
- Xesta complicata Iredale, 1941
- Xesta cornecerea Iredale, 1941
- Xesta dimidiata E. A. Smith, 1896
- Xesta dinawa Iredale, 1941
- Xesta fraudulenta (E. A. Smith, 1887)
- Xesta injecta Iredale, 1941
- Xesta janetabbasae Thach, 2021
- Xesta kaledupana Möllendorff, 1902
- Xesta luctuosa
- Xesta obiana Möllendorff, 1902
- Xesta oldhamiana Iredale, 1941
- Xesta perfragilis Möllendorff, 1902
- Xesta rufostrigata Fulton, 1921
- Xesta srijohnabbasae Thach, 2020
- Xesta steursi (Shuttleworth, 1852)
- Xesta szekeresi Thach, 2023
- Xesta taibaishanensis J. Lin, W.-C. Zhou & D.-N. Chen, 2007
- Xesta tomiana Möllendorff, 1902
- Xesta tritoniensis (Le Guillou, 1842)

Taxa inquirenda

- Xesta ahlburgi Leschke, 1914
- Xesta baramensis Kobelt, 1897
- Xesta fulvizona (E. von Martens, 1867)
- Xesta kalaoensis E. A. Smith, 1896
- Xesta langemaki Leschke, 1912
- Xesta nitida (Möllendorff, 1896)
- Xesta padasensis E. A. Smith, 1895
- Xesta semipartita (Deshayes, 1850)
- Xesta strubelli O. Boettger, 1891
- Xesta sulcatula Sykes, 1903
- Xesta thisbe E. A. Smith, 1895
- Xesta unilineata Dautzenberg, 1894

Species brought into synonymy

- Xesta (Corneoxesta) Iredale, 1941: synonym of Xesta Albers, 1850 (junior synonym)
- Xesta belangeri (Deshayes, 1832): synonym of Ariophanta belangeri (Deshayes, 1832) (superseded combination)
- Xesta bistrialis (H. Beck, 1837): synonym of Ariophanta exilis (O. F. Müller, 1774) (unaccepted > superseded combination)
- Xesta carinocincta E. A. Smith, 1899: synonym of Elaphroconcha carinocincta (E. A. Smith, 1899) (original combination)
- Xesta cincta "Lea, 1834" sensu P. Sarasin & F. Sarasin, 1898: synonym of Naninia steursi (Shuttleworth, 1852): synonym of Xesta steursi (Shuttleworth, 1852) (based on unavailable original name)
- Xesta cumingi (L. Pfeiffer, 1849): synonym of Helicarion cumingii (L. Pfeiffer, 1849) (unaccepted generic combination)
- Xesta distincta (L. Pfeiffer, 1850): synonym of Hemiplecta distincta (L. Pfeiffer, 1850) (superseded combination)
- Xesta dwipana Gude, 1903: synonym of Durgella pusilla (Martens, 1867) (original combination)
- Xesta everetti E. A. Smith, 1897: synonym of Asperitas everetti (E. A. Smith, 1897) (original combination)
- Xesta ligulata (Férussac, 1821): synonym of Cryptozona ligulata (A. Férussac, 1821) (superseded combination)
- Xesta maderaspatana (J. E. Gray, 1834): synonym of Ariophanta maderaspatana (J. E. Gray, 1834) (superseded combination)
- Xesta malaouyi de Morgan, 1885: synonym of Hemiplecta malaouyi (de Morgan, 1885) (original combination)
- Xesta melanoraphe E. A. Smith, 1897: synonym of Asperitas trochus melanoraphe (E. A. Smith, 1897) (original combination)
- Xesta mindanaensis C. Semper, 1870: synonym of Hemiplecta mindanaensis (C. Semper, 1870) (original combination)
- Xesta nobilis (L. Pfeiffer, 1850): synonym of Hemiplecta nobilis (L. Pfeiffer, 1850) (unaccepted > superseded combination)
- Xesta notabilis B. Rensch, 1930: synonym of Asperitas notabilis (Rensch, 1930) (original combination)
- Xesta obliquata (Reeve, 1852): synonym of Hemiplecta obliquata (Reeve, 1852) (superseded combination)
- Xesta piperata Fulton, 1901: synonym of Kalidos piperatus (Fulton, 1901) (original combination)
- Xesta polymorpha E. A. Smith, 1897: synonym of Asperitas trochus polymorpha (E. A. Smith, 1897) (original combination)
- Xesta renitens (Morelet, 1861): synonym of Macrochlamys renitens (Morelet, 1861) (unaccepted combination)
- Xesta rookmaakeri B. Rensch, 1930: synonym of Asperitas rookmaakeri (B. Rensch, 1930) (original combination)
- Xesta rugosissima (Möllendorff, 1903): synonym of Asperitas trochus (O. F. Müller, 1774) (junior synonym)
- Xesta selayarensis E. A. Smith, 1896: synonym of Asperitas trochus selayarensis (E. A. Smith, 1896) (original combination)
- Xesta subpolita E. A. Smith, 1897: synonym of Asperitas bimaensis subpolita (E. A. Smith, 1897) (original combination)
- Xesta themis E. A. Smith, 1895: synonym of Everettia themis (E. A. Smith, 1895) (original combination)
- Xesta tranquebarica (L. Pfeiffer, 1847): synonym of Ariophanta semirugata (H. Beck, 1837) (superseded combination)
- Xesta trochus (O. F. Müller, 1774): synonym of Asperitas trochus (O. F. Müller, 1774) (superseded combination)
