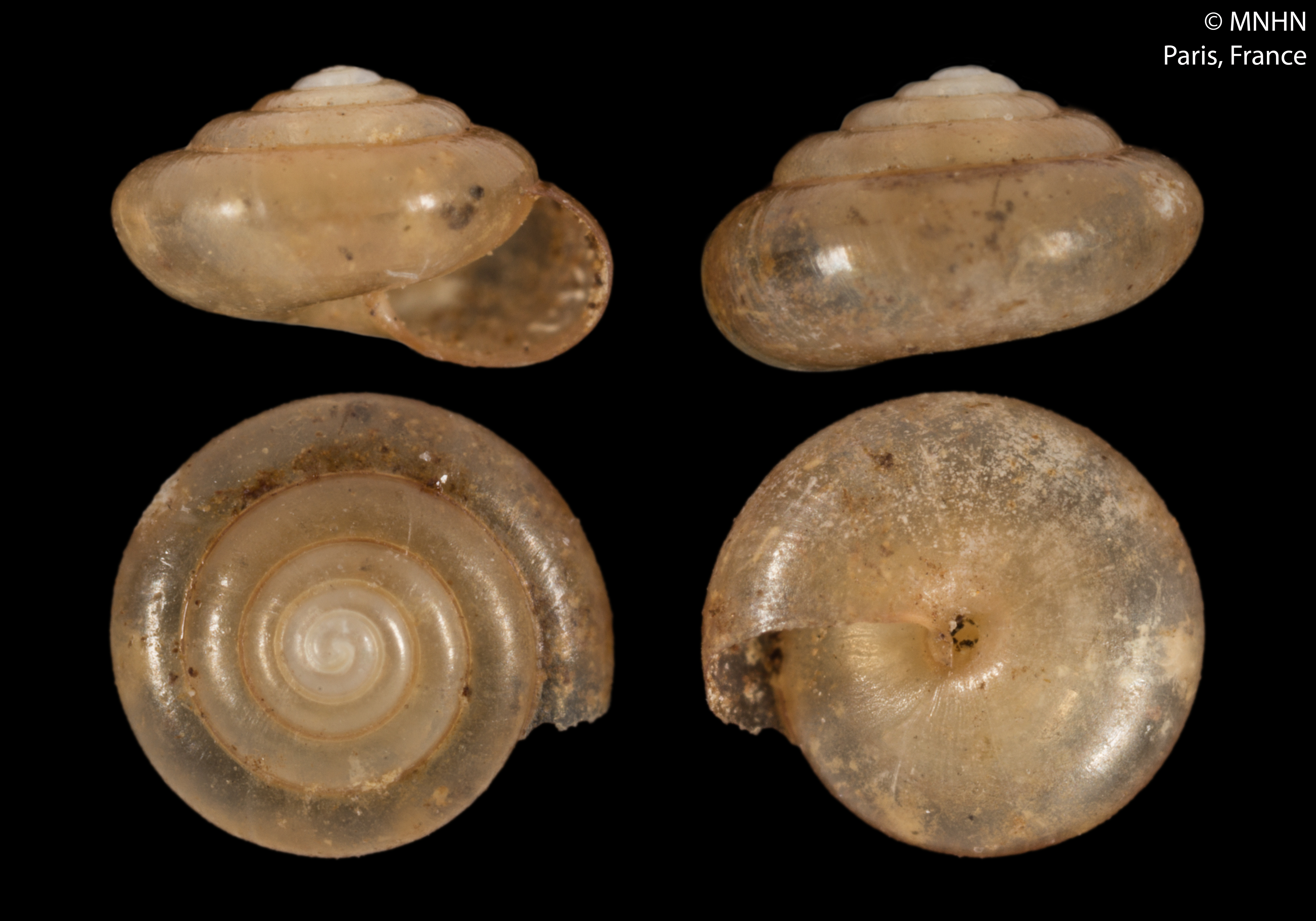
- Shell of Microcystina infima (syntype at MNHN, Paris)

Scientific classification
- Kingdom: Animalia
- Phylum: Mollusca
- Class: Gastropoda
- Order: Stylommatophora
- Infraorder: Limacoidei
- Superfamily: Helicarionoidea
- Family: Ariophantidae
- Genus: Microcystina; Mörch, 1872

Synonyms
- Chronoceryx Iredale, 1941; Nanina (Microcystina) Mörch, 1872 (original rank)

= Microcystina =

Genus of gastropods

Microcystina is a large genus of air-breathing land snails, terrestrial pulmonate gastropod mollusks in the subfamily Macrochlamydinae of the family Ariophantidae.

== Species ==
- Microcystina angigyra Möllendorff, 1901
- Microcystina annamitica (Möllendorff, 1898)
- Microcystina appendiculata (Möllendorff, 1893)
- Microcystina arabii Marzuki, T. S. Liew & Mohd-Azlan, 2021
- Microcystina aruensis (Tapparone Canefri, 1880)
- Microcystina atoni Marzuki, T. S. Liew & Mohd-Azlan, 2021
- Microcystina bataiensis Vermeulen, Luu, Theary & Anker, 2019
- Microcystina bintennensis Godwin-Austen, 1899
- Microcystina bismarckiana Thiele, 1928
- Microcystina bourguignatiana (Mabille & Le Mesle, 1866)
- Microcystina brunii (Mörch, 1872)
- Microcystina brunnescens Vermeulen, 1996
- Microcystina callifera Vermeulen, Liew & Schilthuizen, 2015
- Microcystina cavernae Godwin-Austen, 1891
- Microcystina chionodiscus Vermeulen, 1996
- Microcystina circumlineata (Möllendorff, 1897)
- Microcystina clarkae Maassen, 2000
- Microcystina consobrina Van Benthem Jutting, 1959
- Microcystina cryptomphalus Godwin-Austen, 1882
- Microcystina exigua (Möllendorff, 1897)
- Microcystina exul Vermeulen, Luu, Theary & Anker, 2019
- Microcystina fruhstorferi (Möllendorff, 1897)
- Microcystina gerritsi van Bentham Jutting, 1964
- Microcystina gratilla van Benthem Jutting, 1950
- Microcystina harrietensis Godwin-Austen, 1882
- Microcystina infima (Mabille, 1887)
- Microcystina irregularis Möllendorff, 1902
- Microcystina kilat Marzuki, T. S. Liew & Mohd-Azlan, 2021
- Microcystina leucocystis Möllendorff, 1901
- Microcystina lirata Marzuki, T. S. Liew & Mohd-Azlan, 2021
- Microcystina lita Sykes, 1898
- Microcystina mansonensis Möllendorff, 1901
- Microcystina marginata Möllendorff, 1902
- Microcystina messageri Ancey, 1904
- Microcystina microrhynchus Vermeulen, Liew & Schilthuizen, 2015
- Microcystina minima (H. Adams, 1867)
- Microcystina mirmido (Dautzenberg, 1894)
- Microcystina moerchiana Godwin-Austen, 1882
- Microcystina muscorum Van Benthem Jutting, 1959
- Microcystina nana (Möllendorff, 1897)
- Microcystina obliquestriata Vermeulen, Luu, Theary & Anker, 2019
- Microcystina obscura Thiele, 1928
- Microcystina opaca Möllendorff, 1901
- Microcystina oswaldbrakeni Marzuki, T. S. Liew & Mohd-Azlan, 2021
- Microcystina paripari Marzuki, T. S. Liew & Mohd-Azlan, 2021
- Microcystina physotrochus Vermeulen, Liew & Schilthuizen, 2015
- Microcystina planiuscula Vermeulen, Liew & Schilthuizen, 2015
- Microcystina pudens Godwin-Austen, 1891
- Microcystina radioplicata B. Rensch, 1930
- Microcystina rinki (Mörch, 1872)
- Microcystina rowsoni Gittenberger & van Bruggen, 2013
- Microcystina rubiginosa van Benthem Jutting, 1958
- Microcystina schmackeriana (Möllendorff, 1883)
- Microcystina seclusa Godwin-Austen, 1891
- Microcystina sericata Vermeulen, Luu, Theary & Anker, 2019
- Microcystina shevaroyana W. T. Blanford, 1904
- Microcystina sicaveiensis (Heude, 1882)
- Microcystina stewarti Blanford, 1904
- Microcystina striatula Vermeulen, Liew & Schilthuizen, 2015
- Microcystina stuarti W. T. Blanford, 1904
- Microcystina subglobosa (Möllendorff, 1897)
- Microcystina sublimis (Hedley, 1897)
- Microcystina tongkingensis Möllendorff, 1901
- Microcystina trochiscus (Pfeiffer, 1861)
- Microcystina vernacula (Mabille, 1887)
- Microcystina vitreiformis (Möllendorff, 1897)
- Microcystina warnefordi Godwin-Austen, 1882
