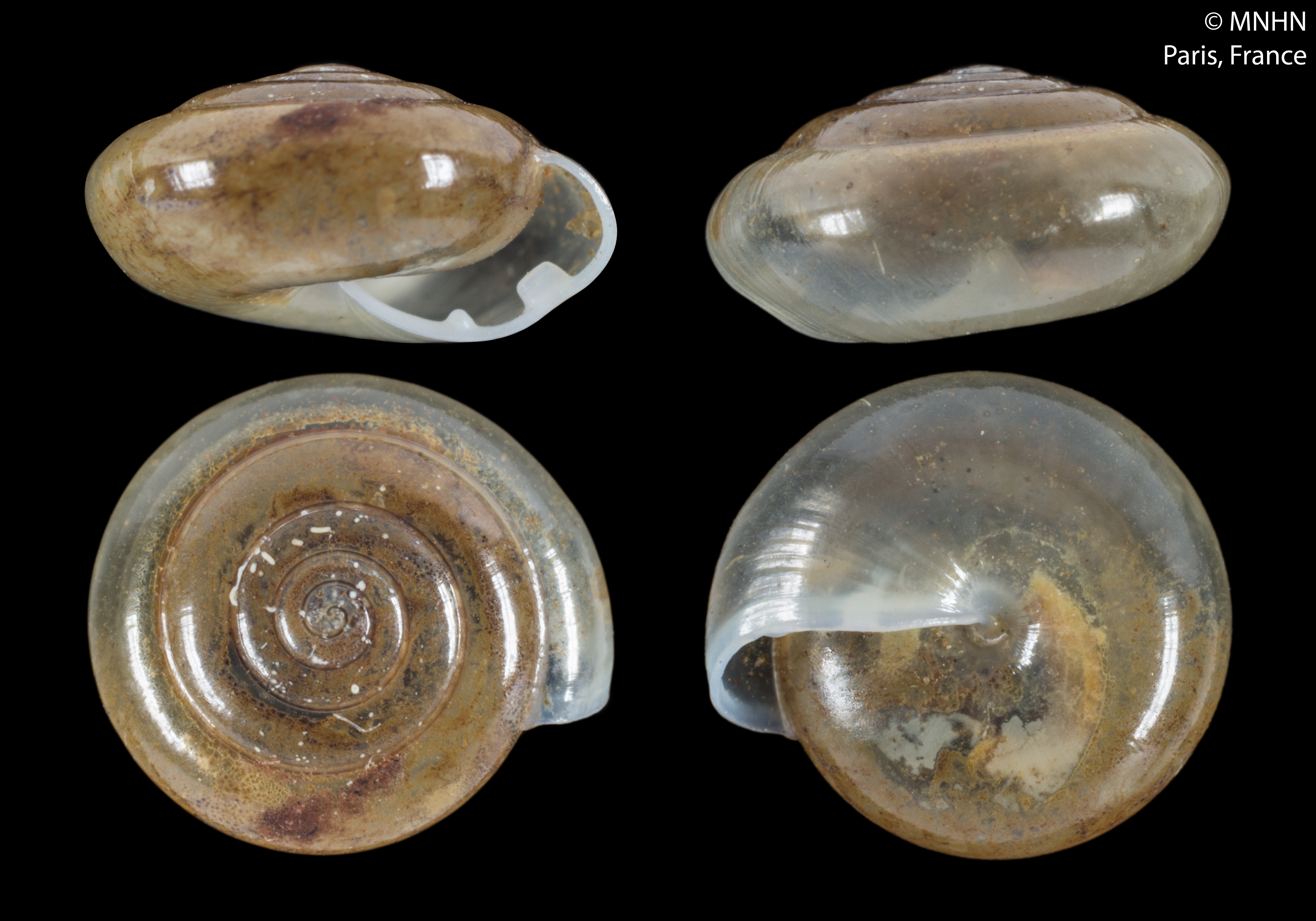
- Shell of Sesara bouyei (syntype at MNHN, Paris)

Scientific classification
- Kingdom: Animalia
- Phylum: Mollusca
- Class: Gastropoda
- Order: Stylommatophora
- Infraorder: Limacoidei
- Superfamily: Helicarionoidea
- Family: Ariophantidae
- Genus: Sesara; Albers, 1860

Type species
- Helix infrendens Gould, 1843

Synonyms
- Helix (Sesara) Albers, 1860(original rank); Nanina (Sesara) Albers, 1860

= Sesara =

Genus of gastropods

Sesara is a genus of air-breathing land snails, terrestrial pulmonate gastropod mollusks in the subfamily Macrochlamydinae of the family Ariophantidae.

== Species ==
- Sesara annamitica (Möllendorff, 1900)
- Sesara ataranensis (Theobald, 1870)
- Sesara bouyei (Crosse & P. Fischer, 1863)
- Sesara diplodon (Benson, 1859)
- Sesara episema Ponsonby, 1894
- Sesara galea (Benson, 1859)
- Sesara globosa Godwin-Austen, 1918
- Sesara harmeri Gude, 1900
- Sesara infrendens (Gould, 1843)
- Sesara ingrami Blanford, 1880
- Sesara melagodon W. T. Blanford, 1902
- Sesara parva Solem, 1966
- Sesara penoti Ancey, 1898
- Sesara polita Vermeulen, Luu, Theary & Anker, 2019
- Sesara pylaica (Benson, 1856)
- Sesara sesarella Vermeulen, Luu, Theary & Anker, 2019
- Sesara triodon Tanmuangpak & S. Tumpeesuwan, 2017

Synonyms

- Sesara bidenticulata (Benson, 1852): synonym of Philalanka bidenticulata (Benson, 1852) (superseded combination)
- Sesara daghoba (W. T. Blanford & H. F. Blanford, 1861): synonym of Philalanka daghoba (W. T. Blanford & H. F. Blanford, 1861) (superseded combination)
- Sesara pirrienana (Reeve, 1854): synonym of Philalanka pirrieana (Reeve, 1854) (superseded combination)

Taxa inquirenda

- Sesara hungerfordiana Theobald, 1876
- Sesara inermis Theobald, 1876
- Sesara mouleyitensis Gude, 1901
