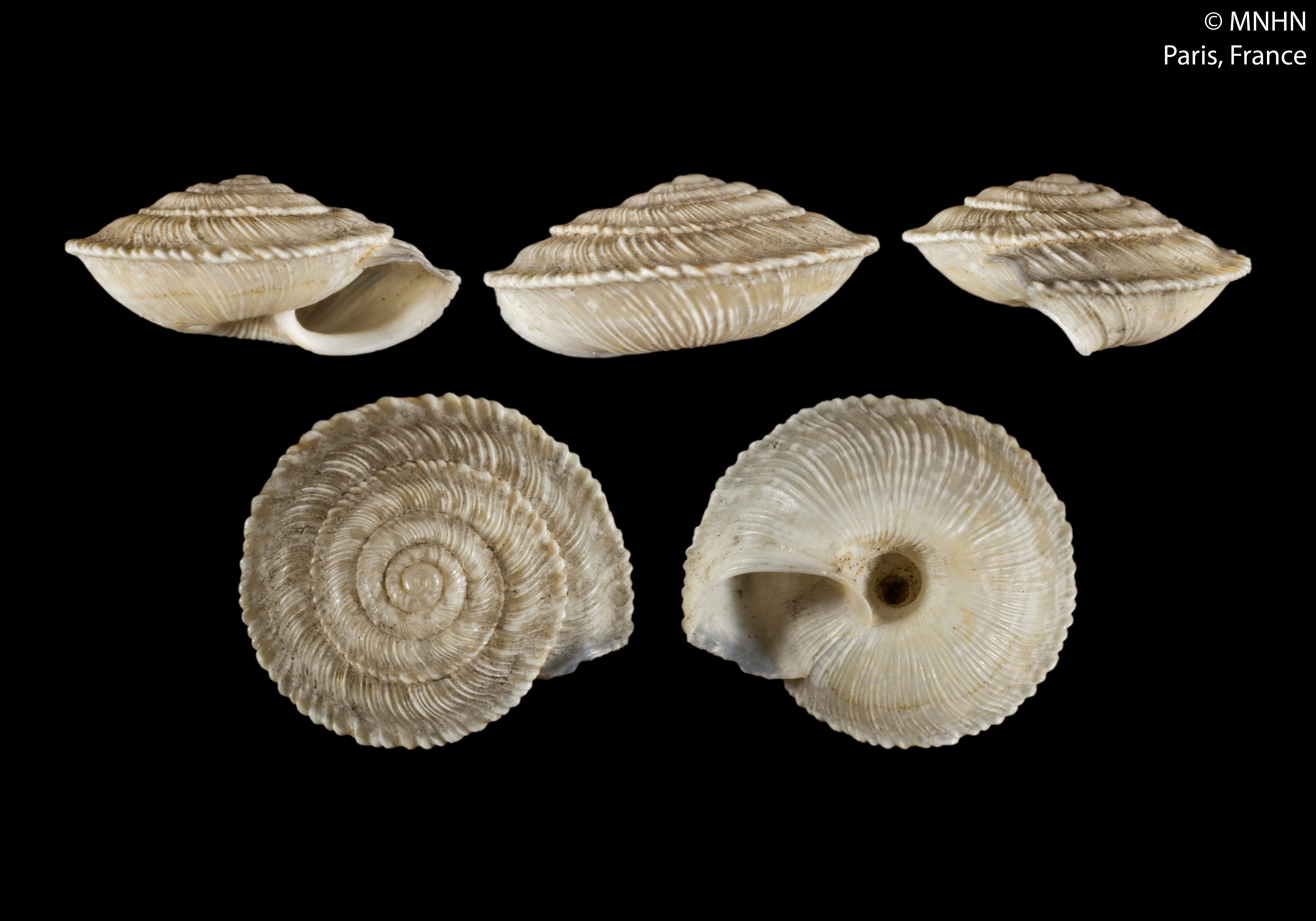
- Shell of Khasiella serrula (syntype at MNHN, Paris)

Scientific classification
- Domain: Eukaryota
- Kingdom: Animalia
- Phylum: Mollusca
- Class: Gastropoda
- Order: Stylommatophora
- Infraorder: Limacoidei
- Superfamily: Helicarionoidea
- Family: Ariophantidae
- Genus: Khasiella; Godwin-Austen, 1899

Synonyms
- Ariophanta (Khasiella) Godwin-Austen, 1899 (original rank)

= Khasiella =

Genus of gastropods

Khasiella is a genus of air-breathing land snails, terrestrial pulmonate gastropod mollusks in the family Ariophantidae.

== Species ==
- Khasiella austeni (W. T. Blanford, 1870)
- Khasiella chloroplax (Benson, 1865)
- Khasiella climacterica (Benson, 1836)
- Khasiella dinoensis Godwin-Austen, 1918
- Khasiella falcata (W. T. Blanford, 1870)
- Khasiella hyba (Benson, 1861)
- Khasiella ornatissima (Benson, 1859)
- Khasiella serrula (Benson, 1836)
- Khasiella sonamurgensis (G. Nevill, 1878)
- Khasiella tandianensis (Theobald, 1881)
- Khasiella vidua (Hanley & Theobald, 1876)

Species brought into synonymy

- Khasiella kashmirensis (G. Nevill, 1878): synonym of Macrochlamys kashmirensis (G. Nevill, 1878) (unaccepted combination)
