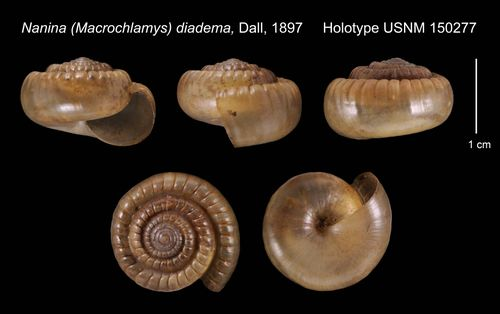
- Holotype of Nanina (Macrochlamys) diadema (Dall, 1897)

Scientific classification
- Kingdom: Animalia
- Phylum: Mollusca
- Class: Gastropoda
- Order: Stylommatophora
- Family: Ariophantidae
- Genus: Taphrenalla; Pholyotha & Panha, 2021

Type species
- Nanina (Macrochlamys) diadema Dall, 1897

= Taphrenalla =

Genus of land snails

Taphrenalla is a genus of land snails belonging to the family Ariophantidae. The genus Taphrenalla is endemic to Malay Peninsula, specifically in Southern Thailand. These places are characterized with its wet conditions throughout the year, which allow these land snails to thrive.

== Etymology ==
Taphrenalla comes from a combination of the Greek words "Taphros", meaning "trench or ditch" and "enallax", meaning crosswise, hinting at the unique radial grooves found on their shells.

== Species ==
9 new species were introduced in this paper, together with 2 species which were previously under a different genus.

- Taphrenalla diadema (Dall, 1897) — previously Nanina (Macrochlamys) diadema
- Taphrenalla asamurai (Panha, 1997) — previously Macrochlamys asamurai
- Taphrenalla alba Pholyotha & Panha, 2021
- Taphrenalla dalli Pholyotha & Panha, 2021
- Taphrenalla conformis Pholyotha & Panha, 2021
- Taphrenalla macrosulcata Pholyotha & Panha, 2021
- Taphrenalla parversa Pholyotha & Panha, 2021
- Taphrenalla incilis Pholyotha & Panha, 2021
- Taphrenalla pygmaea Pholyotha & Panha, 2021
- Taphrenalla zemia Pholyotha & Panha, 2021
- Taphrenalla corona Pholyotha & Panha, 2021

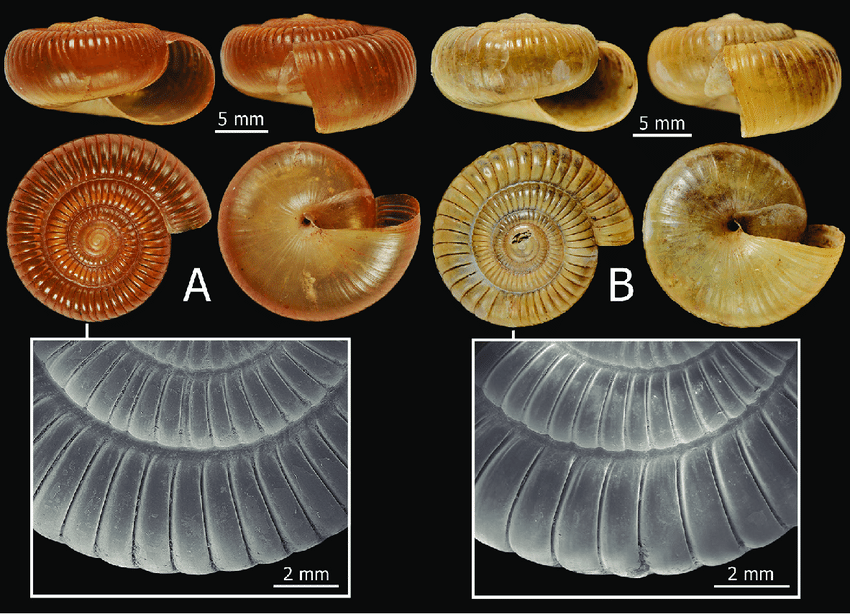
Radial grooves of the shell. A.Taphrenalla asamurai specimen. B. Taphrenalla macrosulcata holotype.

== Morphology ==
Taphrenalla have 3 distinct features, the radial grooves present on their shells, their spermatophore morphology, and the unique colourful stripes across their entire body.

The two Crown Snails, T. asamurai and T.diadema were previously known under the genus Macrochlamys, then subsequently transferred to the genus Sarika due to morphological similarities. Later on, studies have identified one of the key distinguishing feature of the Taphrenalla genus to be the radial grooves on their shells, though there exist species in this genus such as T. zemia and T.alba with no radial grooves present on their shells.

The spermatophore of the Taphrenalla genus is also such that its spine structure differs from that of the other genera under the family Ariophantidae.

Taphrenalla species also have distinctly colourful stripes that cannot be found in other genus under the same family.

== Geographical patterns ==
Taphrenalla is found in Karst landscapes, along the two main mountain ranges of Southern Thailand.

Nearer the coast, species typically have strongly evident radial grooves while those located further away from the coasts (T. zemia and T. alba) experience a loss in radial grooves on their shells. This is with the exception of T. corona with obvious radial grooves but are found further away from the coast.
