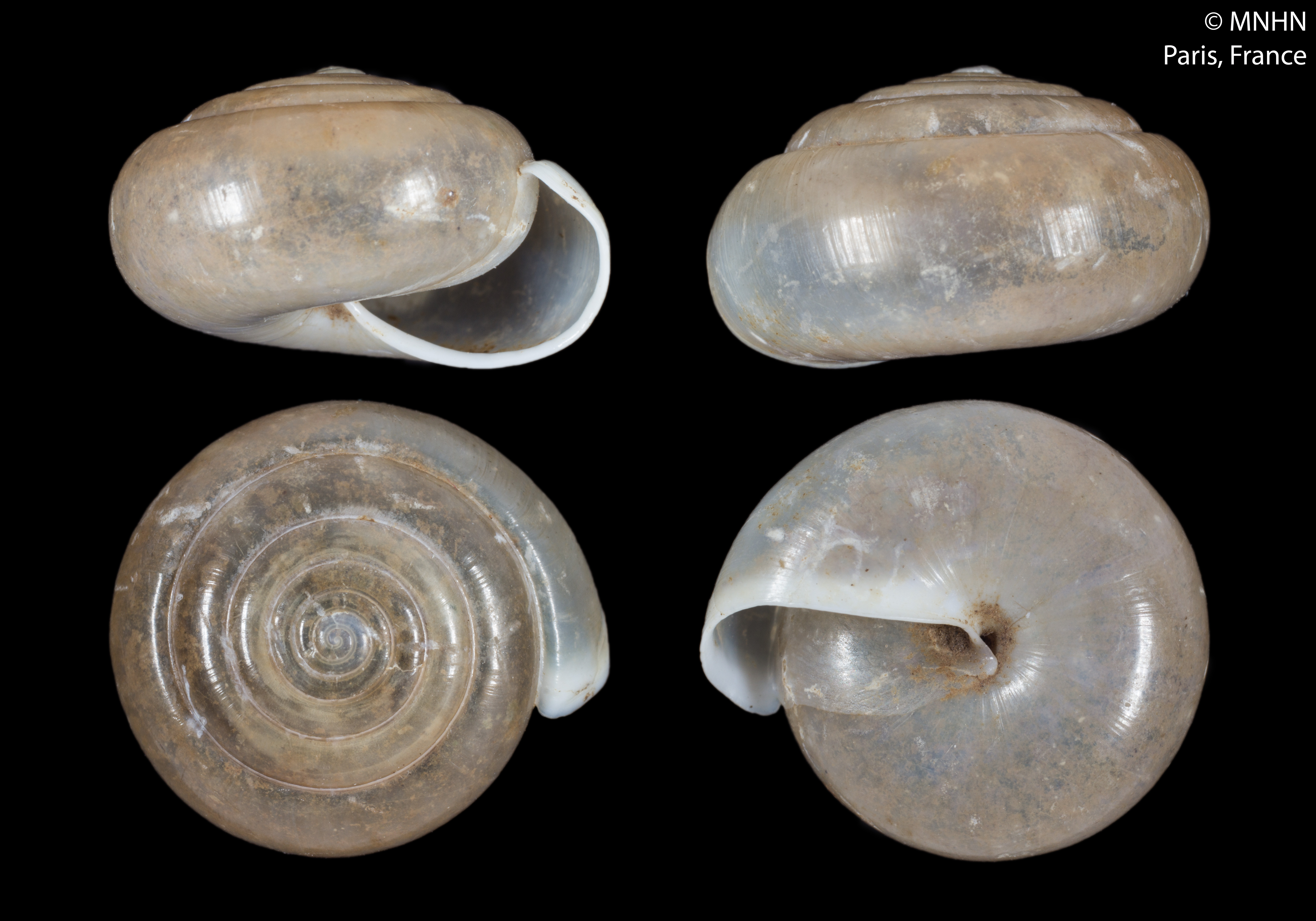
- Shell of Sarika dugasti (syntype at MNHN, Paris)

Scientific classification
- Domain: Eukaryota
- Kingdom: Animalia
- Phylum: Mollusca
- Class: Gastropoda
- Order: Stylommatophora
- Infraorder: Limacoidei
- Superfamily: Helicarionoidea
- Family: Ariophantidae
- Genus: Sarika; Godwin-Austen, 1907

Type species
- Helix resplendens Philippi, 1847

= Sarika (gastropod) =

Genus of gastropods

Sarika is a large genus of air-breathing land snails, terrestrial pulmonate gastropod mollusks in the subfamily Macrochlamydinae of the family Ariophantidae.

== Species ==
- Sarika benoiti (Crosse & P. Fischer, 1863)
- Sarika birmana (L. Pfeiffer, 1857)
- Sarika bocourti (Morelet, 1875)
- Sarika caligina Pholyotha & Panha, 2020
- Sarika concavata Pholyotha, Sutcharit, Tongkerd, Lin & Panha, 2020
- Sarika consepta (Benson, 1860)
- Sarika costabilis A. Pholyotha, 2022
- Sarika costata A. Pholyotha, 2022
- Sarika despecta (Mabille, 1887)
- Sarika dohrniana (L. Pfeiffer, 1860)
- Sarika dugasti (Morlet, 1891)
- Sarika gratesi Pholyotha & Panha, 2020
- Sarika hainesi (L. Pfeiffer, 1856)
- Sarika heptagyra (Möllendorff, 1902)
- Sarika inferospira Pholyotha & Panha, 2020
- Sarika kawtaoensis Tomlin, 1929
- Sarika khmeriana Pholyotha & Panha, 2020
- Sarika lactoconcha Pholyotha & Panha, 2020
- Sarika lactospira Pholyotha & Panha, 2020
- Sarika limbata (Möllendorff, 1894)
- Sarika lopa Pholyotha, Sutcharit, Tongkerd, Lin & Panha, 2020
- Sarika megalogyne Pholyotha & Panha, 2020
- Sarika melanospira Pholyotha & Panha, 2020
- Sarika nana Pholyotha & Panha, 2020
- Sarika obesior (Martens, 1867)
- Sarika ochtogyra (Möllendorff, 1902)
- Sarika pellosa Pholyotha & Panha, 2020
- Sarika planata Laidlaw, 1933
- Sarika pumicata (Morelet, 1875)
- Sarika resplendens (Philippi, 1847)
- Sarika rex (Preston, 1909)
- Sarika siamensis (L. Pfeiffer, 1856)
- Sarika solemi Pholyotha & Panha, 2020
- Sarika subcornea (L. Pfeiffer, 1860)
- Sarika subheptagyra Pholyotha & Panha, 2020
- Sarika theodori (Philippi, 1847)

Synonyms

- Sarika asamurai (Panha, 1997): synonym of Taphrenalla asamurai (Panha, 1997) (superseded combination)
- Sarika diadema (Dall, 1897): synonym of Taphrenalla diadema (Dall, 1897) (superseded combination)
- Sarika hainesii (L. Pfeiffer, 1856): synonym of Sarika hainesi (L. Pfeiffer, 1856) (incorrect subsequent spelling)
