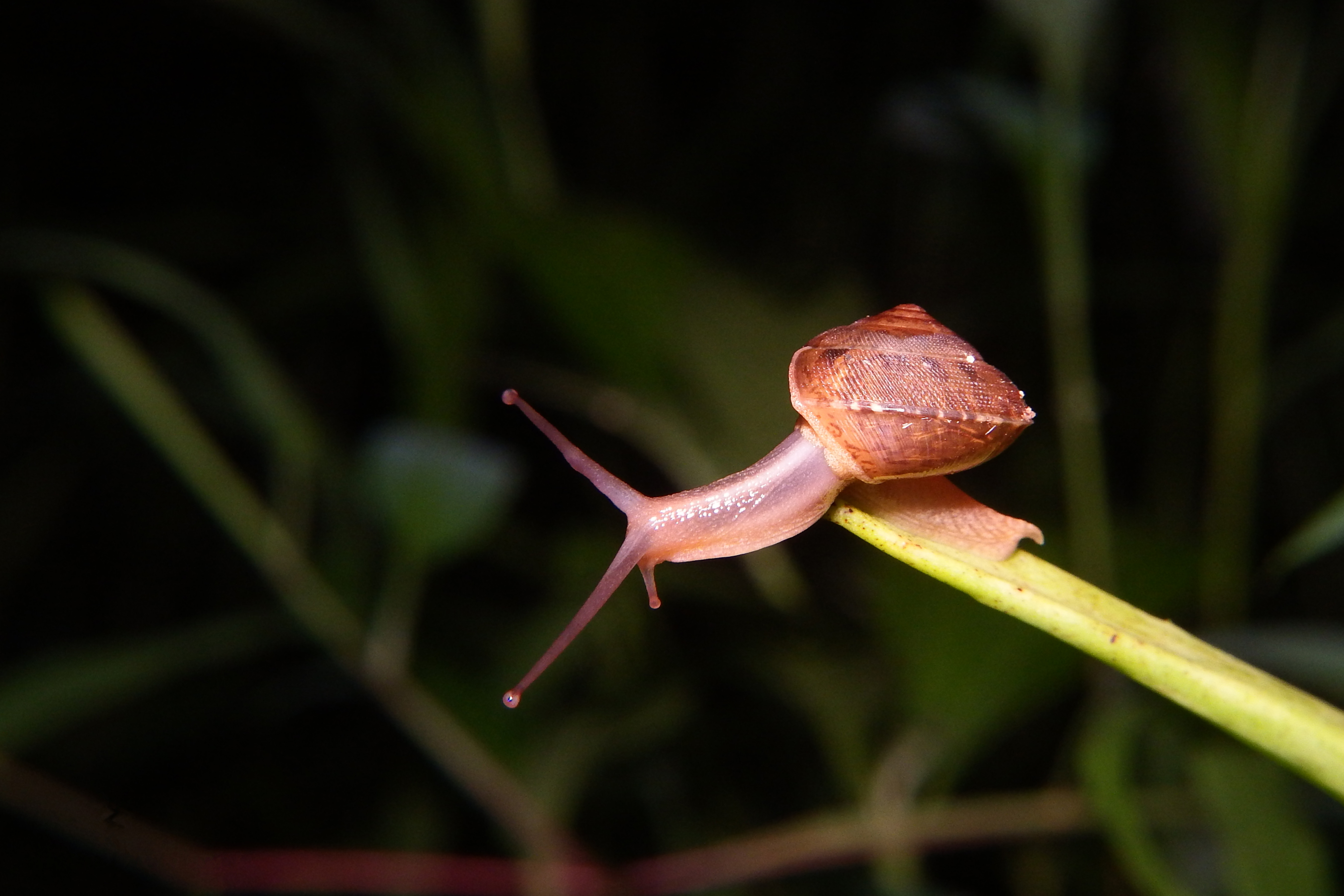
- Euplecta indica

Scientific classification
- Kingdom: Animalia
- Phylum: Mollusca
- Class: Gastropoda
- Order: Stylommatophora
- Infraorder: Limacoidei
- Superfamily: Helicarionoidea
- Family: Ariophantidae
- Genus: Euplecta; C. Semper, 1870

Type species
- Helix subopaca L. Pfeiffer, 1853

Synonyms
- Nanina (Thysanota) Albers, 1860

= Euplecta =

Genus of gastropods

Euplecta is a genus of air-breathing land snails, terrestrial pulmonate gastropod molluscs in the family Ariophantidae.

These snails are restricted to South India and Sri Lanka.

More than eighty species are recognized according to the World Register of Marine Species (WoRMS).

== Species ==
- Euplecta acalles (Pfeiffer, 1857)
- Euplecta acuducta (Benson, 1850)
- Euplecta albizonata (Dohrn, 1858)
- Euplecta apicata (Blanford, 1870)
- Euplecta baconi (Benson, 1850)
- Euplecta binoyaensis Godwin-Austen, 1899
- Euplecta cacuminifera (Benson, 1850)
- Euplecta colletti (E.R. Sykes, 1897)
- Euplecta concavospira (L. Pfeiffer, 1854)
- Euplecta eastlakeana (O.F. von Möllendorff, 1883)
- Euplecta emiliana (L. Pfeiffer, 1852)
- Euplecta fluctuosa Blanford, 1901
- Euplecta foveolata Preston, 1909
- Euplecta gardneri (L. Pfeiffer, 1846)
- Euplecta granulifera Blanford, 1901
- Euplecta herosae Thach & F. Huber, 2018: synonym of Trichochloritis fouresi (Morlet, 1886) (junior synonym)
- Euplecta huberi Thach, 2018: synonym of Ganesella emma (L. Pfeiffer, 1863) (junior synonym)
- Euplecta hueae Thach & F. Huber, 2018: synonym of Ganesella rostrella (L. Pfeiffer, 1863) (junior synonym)
- Euplecta hyphasma (L. Pfeiffer, 1853)
- Euplecta imperforata Schepman, 1918
- Euplecta indica (L. Pfeiffer, 1846)
- Euplecta isabellina (L. Pfeiffer, 1854)
- Euplecta laevis W.T. Blanford, 1901
- Euplecta lankaensis H.B. Preston, 1909
- Euplecta layardi (L. Pfeiffer, 1851)
- Euplecta mucosa (W. T. Blanford & H. F. Blanford, 1861)
- Euplecta mucronifera Blanford, 1901
- Euplecta neglecta (L. Pfeiffer, 1854)
- Euplecta oribates Blanford, 1901
- Euplecta partita (L. Pfeiffer, 1854)
- Euplecta phidias (S.C.T. Hanley & W. Theobald, 1876)
- Euplecta pingoungensis Godwin-Austen, 1888
- Euplecta prestoni (H.H. Godwin-Austen, 1897)
- Euplecta pulchella Blanford, 1905
- Euplecta rosamonda (W.H. Benson, 1860)
- Euplecta schneideriana I. Rensch, 1930
- Euplecta scobinoides E.R. Sykes, 1897
- Euplecta semidecussata (L. Pfeiffer, 1853)
- Euplecta subcastor (Beddome, 1891)
- Euplecta subdecussata (Pfeiffer, 1857)
- Euplecta subopaca (L. Pfeiffer, 1853)
- Euplecta travancorica (Benson, 1865)
- Euplecta trimeni (F.P. Jousseaume, 1894)
- Euplecta tripilaris (Gredler, 1890)
- Euplecta turritella (C.B. Adams, 1869)
- Euplecta verrucula (L. Pfeiffer, 1855)

However, Worldwide Mollusc Species Database described (WMSD)

- Euplecta adulta (A.R.J.B. Bavay, 1908)
- Euplecta aylvaus W.L.H. Dohrn
- Euplecta biserialis Unknown
- Euplecta divisa (E. Forbes, 1851)
- Euplecta haematina (O.F. von Möllendorff)
- Euplecta inclinata (L. Pfeiffer, 1864)
- Euplecta juvenis (E.A. Smith)
- Euplecta minor (C. Hedley, 1891)
- Euplecta rathouisii (P.M. Heude, 1880)
- Euplecta rosseliana (E.A. Smith, 1889)
- Euplecta woodlarkensis (C. Hedley, 1891)
