= Varadia =

Varadia may refer to:

- Vărădia, a commune in Caraș-Severin County, Romania
- Vărădia de Mureș, a commune in Arad County, Romania
- Varadia (gastropod), a genus of molluscs in the family Ariophantidae
