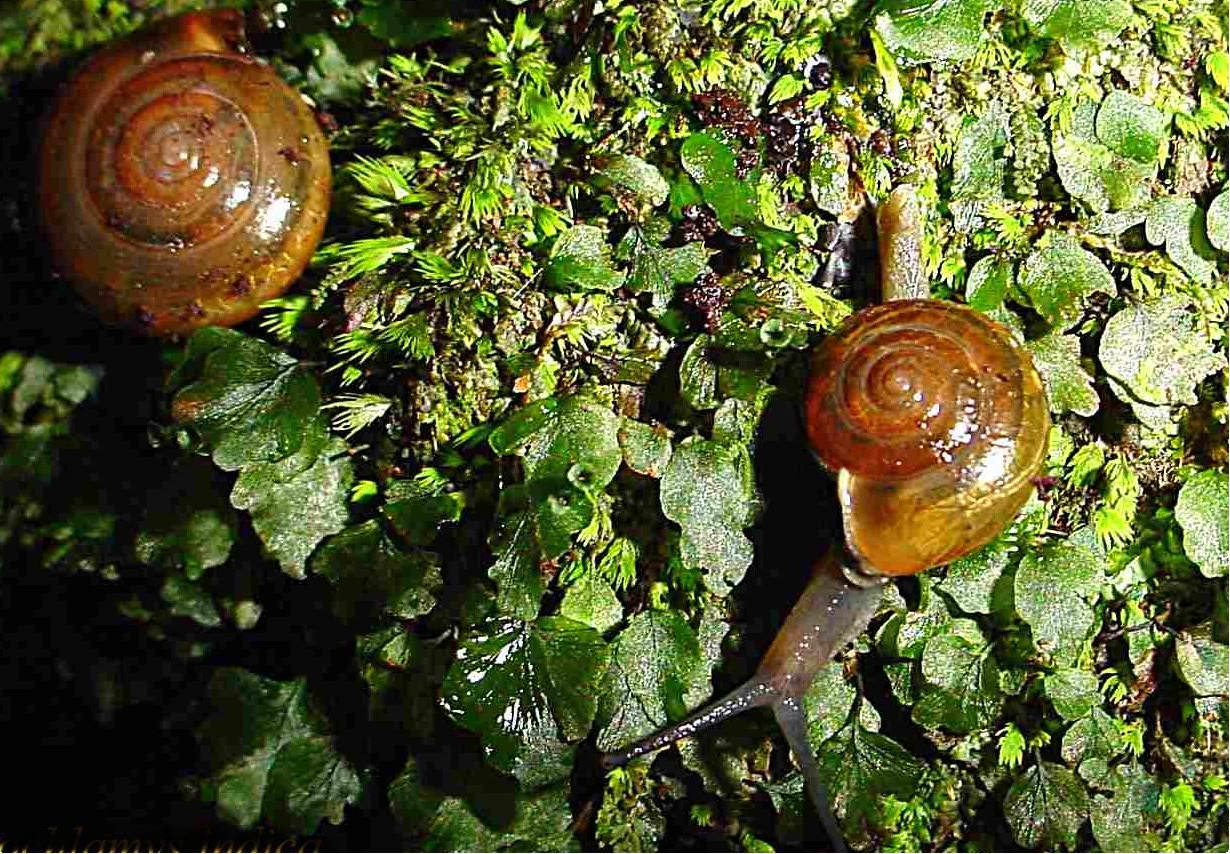
- Two live individuals of Macrochlamys indica

Scientific classification
- Kingdom: Animalia
- Phylum: Mollusca
- Class: Gastropoda
- Order: Stylommatophora
- Suborder: Helicina
- Infraorder: Limacoidei
- Superfamily: Helicarionoidea
- Family: Ariophantidae; Godwin-Austen, 1888

Genera
- See text

= Ariophantidae =

Family of gastropods

Ariophantidae is a taxonomic family of air-breathing land snails and semi-slugs, terrestrial pulmonate gastropod mollusks in the superfamily Helicarionoidea (according to the taxonomy of the Gastropoda by Bouchet & Rocroi, 2005).

== Distribution ==
The distribution of the family Ariophantidae includes India and south-eastern Asia.

== Anatomy ==
Snails within this family make and use love darts made of chitin.

In this family, the number of haploid chromosomes lies between 21 and 25 and also lies between 31 and 35, but other values are also possible (according to the values in this table).

== Taxonomy ==
=== Subfamilies ===
The family Ariophantidae consists of 3 subfamilies:

- Ariophantinae Godwin-Austen, 1888 - synonyms: Naninidae Pfeffer, 1878 (inv.); Hemiplectinae Gude & B. B. Woodward, 1921
- Macrochlamydinae Godwin-Austen, 1888 - synonyms: Tanychlamydinae H. B. Baker, 1928; Vitrinulini Schileyko, 2003
- Ostracolethinae Simroth, 1901 - synonyms: Parmarioninae Godwin-Austen, 1908; Laocaiini Schileyko, 2002; Microparmarionini Schileyko, 2003; Myotestidae Collinge, 1902

=== Genera ===
The following genera are recognised in the family Ariophantidae:

Ariophantinae

- Ariophanta Des Moulins, 1829 - type genus of the family Ariophantidae
- Bapuia Godwin-Austen, 1918
- Cryptogirasia Cockerell, 1891
- Cryptozona Mörch, 1872
- Dalingia Godwin-Austen, 1907
- Dihangia Godwin-Austen, 1916
- Euplecta C. Semper, 1870
- Galongia Godwin-Austen, 1916
- Hemiplecta Albers, 1850
- Indrella Godwin-Austen, 1901
- Khasiella Godwin-Austen, 1899
- Mariaella Gray, 1855
- Megaustenia Cockerell, 1912
- Ratnadvipia Godwin-Austen, 1899 - endemic to Sri Lanka
- Ravana Godwin-Austen, 1901
- Schwammeria Schileyko, 2010
- Sitalinopsis Thiele, 1931
- Taphrospira W. T. Blanford, 1904
- Xesta Albers, 1850

Macrochlamydinae

- Baiaplecta Laidlaw, 1956
- Himalodiscus Kuznetsov, 1996
- Macrochlamys Gray, 1847 - type genus of the subfamily Macrochlamydinae
- Microcystina Mörch, 1872
- Oxytesta Zilch, 1956
- Parvatella W. T. Blanford & Godwin-Austen, 1908
- Rahula Godwin-Austen, 1907
- Sakiella Godwin-Austen, 1908
- Sarika Godwin-Austen, 1907
- Sesara Albers, 1860
- Syama W. T. Blanford & Godwin-Austen, 1908
- Tadunia Godwin-Austen, 1918
- Taphrenalla Pholyotha & Panha, 2021
- Varadia Bhosale & Raheem, 2021
- Vitrinula Gray, 1857

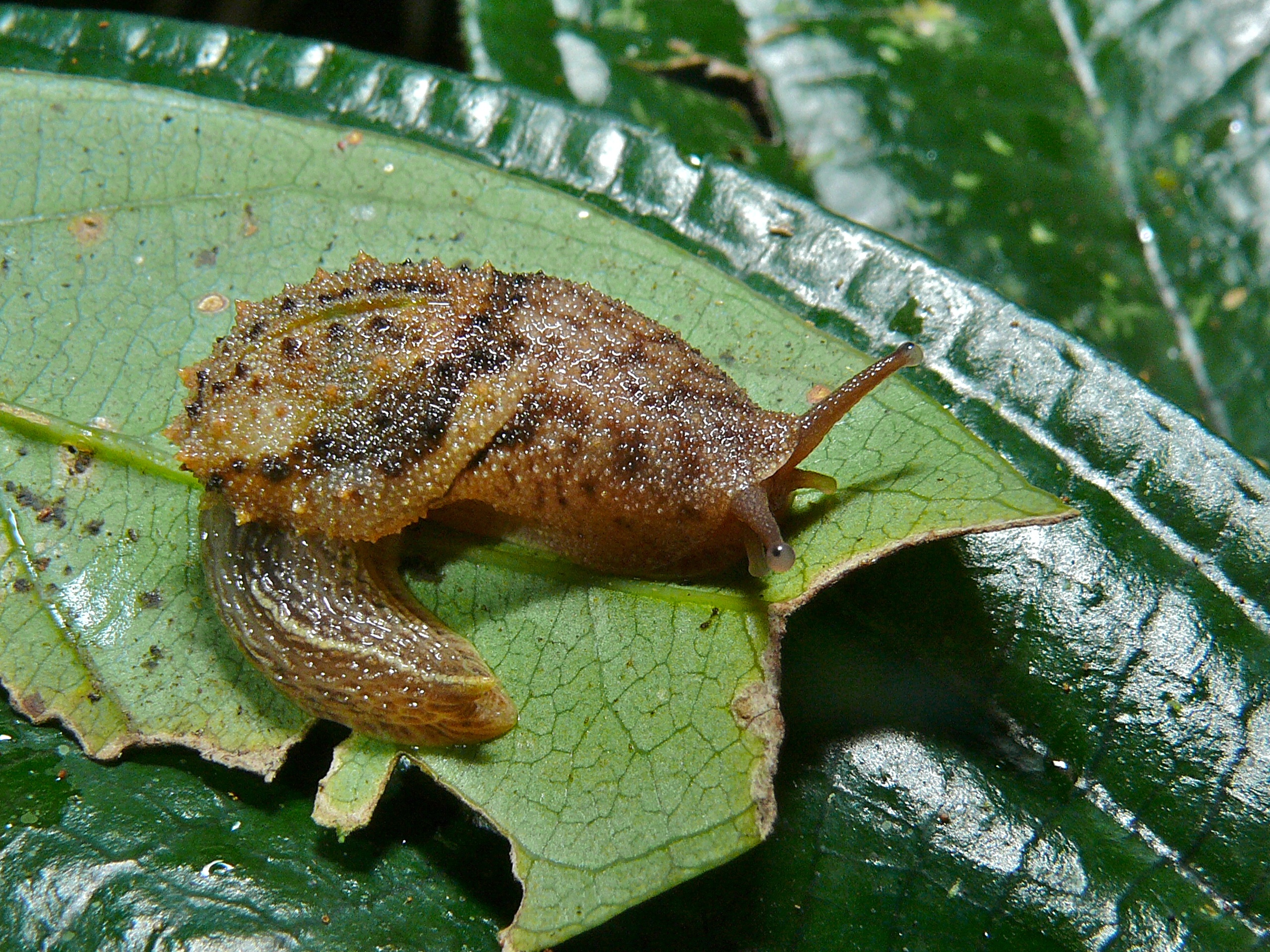
Microparmarion simrothi

Ostracolethinae

- Apoparmarion Collinge, 1902
- Cambodiparmarion Kuznetsov & Kuzminykh, 1999
- Cryptosemelus Collinge, 1902
- Damayantia Issel, 1874
- Damayantiella Zilch, 1959
- Isselentia Collinge, 1901
- Microparmarion Simroth, 1893
- Minyongia Godwin-Austen, 1916
- Ostracolethe Simroth, 1901 - type genus of the subfamily Ostracolethinae
- Paraparmarion Collinge, 1902
- Parmarion P. Fischer, 1855
- Parmunculus Collinge, 1899
- Philippinella Möllendorff, 1899
- Wiegmannia Collinge, 1901

Subfamily not assigned

- Falsiplecta Schileyko & Semenyuk, 2018

== Cladogram ==
The following cladogram shows the phylogenic relationships of this family with other families in the limacoid clade:

- limacoid clade
  - Staffordioidea
    Staffordiidae
  - - - Dyakioidea
        Dyakiidae
      - Gastrodontoidea
        - Pristilomatidae
        - - Chronidae
          - - Euconulidae
            - Trochomorphidae
          - - Gastrodontidae
            - Oxychilidae
    - - Parmacelloidea
        - Trigonochlamydidae
        - Parmacellidae
        - Milacidae
      - - - Zonitoidea
            Zonitidae
          - Helicarionoidea
            - Helicarionidae
            - - Ariophantidae
              - Urocyclidae
        - Limacoidea
          - Vitrinidae
          - - Boettgerillidae
            - - Limacidae
              - Agriolimacidae
