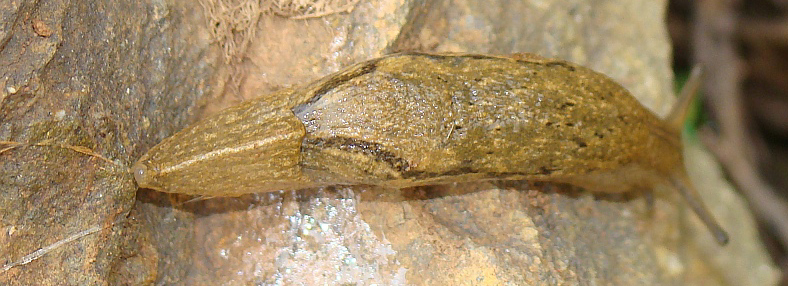
- Parmacella valenciennii (Parmacellidae)

Scientific classification
- Kingdom: Animalia
- Phylum: Mollusca
- Class: Gastropoda
- Order: Stylommatophora
- Suborder: Helicina
- Infraorder: Limacoidei
- Superfamily: Parmacelloidea; P. Fischer, 1856 (1855)

= Parmacelloidea =

Superfamily of gastropods

Parmacelloidea is a superfamily of air-breathing land slugs, terrestrial pulmonate gastropod mollusks in the clade Stylommatophora and the informal group Pulmonata. These are limacoid or keelback slugs.

== Families ==
Families within the superfamily Parmacelloidea include:

- Parmacellidae
- Milacidae
- Trigonochlamydidae

== Cladogram ==
The following cladogram shows the phylogenic relationships of this superfamily to the other superfamilies and families within the limacoid clade:

- limacoid clade
  - Staffordioidea
    Staffordiidae
  - - - Dyakioidea
        Dyakiidae
      - Gastrodontoidea
        - Pristilomatidae
        - - Chronidae
          - - Euconulidae
            - Trochomorphidae
          - - Gastrodontidae
            - Oxychilidae
    - - Parmacelloidea
        - Trigonochlamydidae
        - Parmacellidae
        - Milacidae
      - - - Zonitoidea
            Zonitidae
          - Helicarionoidea
            - Helicarionidae
            - - Ariophantidae
              - Urocyclidae
        - Limacoidea
          - Vitrinidae
          - - Boettgerillidae
            - - Limacidae
              - Agriolimacidae
