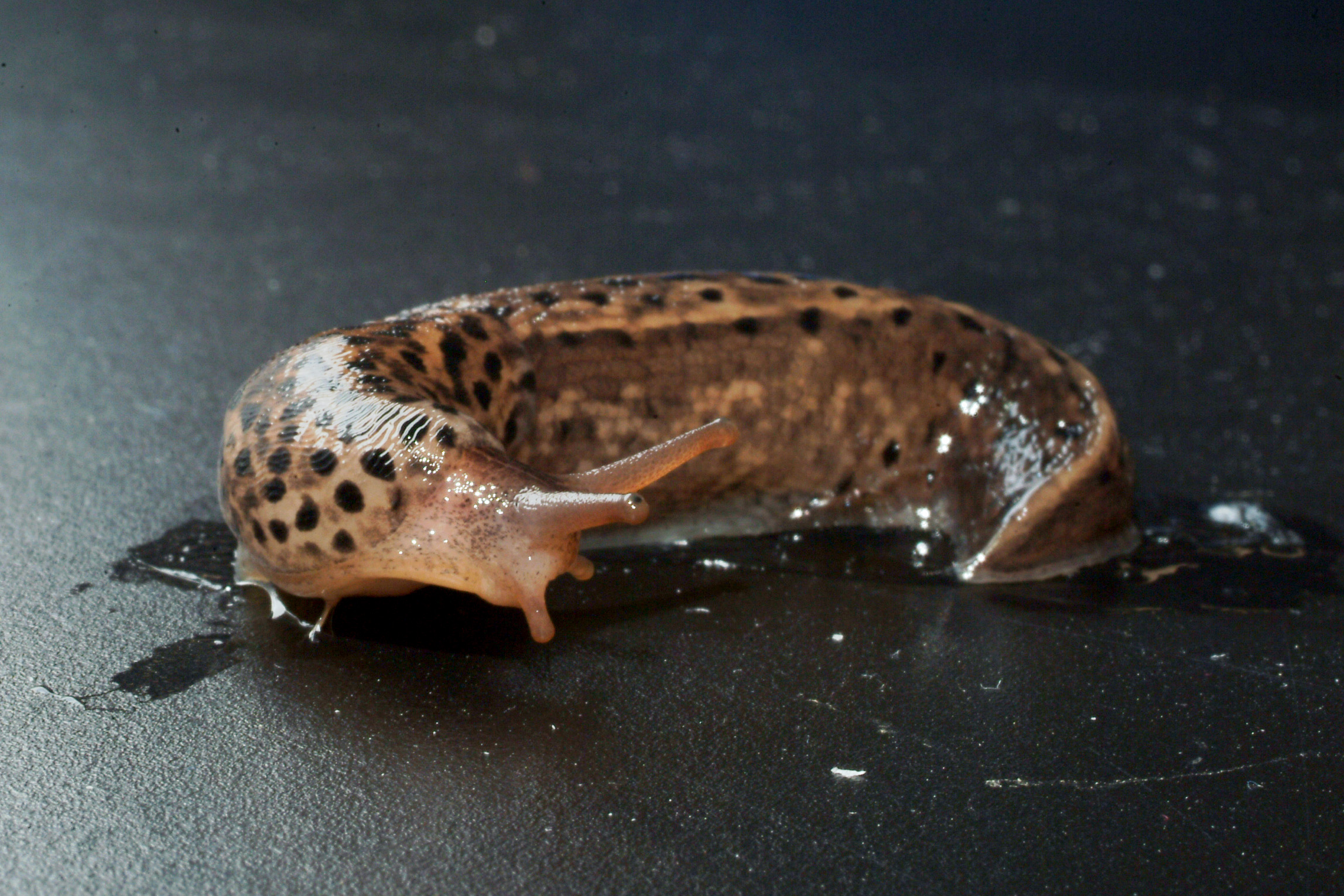
- A live individual of Limax maximus

Scientific classification
- Kingdom: Animalia
- Phylum: Mollusca
- Class: Gastropoda
- Order: Stylommatophora
- Infraorder: Limacoidei
- Superfamily: Limacoidea; Lamarck, 1801

Families
- See text

= Limacoidea =

Superfamily of gastropods

Limacoidea is a taxonomic superfamily of medium-sized to large, air-breathing land slugs and snails. They are terrestrial pulmonate gastropod mollusks in the infraorder Stylommatophora (according to the taxonomy of the Gastropoda by Bouchet & Rocroi, 2005).

The Helixarionoidea were previously placed in this superfamily.

== Families ==
The following four families have been recognized in the taxonomy of Bouchet & Rocroi (2005):

- Limacidae
- Agriolimacidae
- Boettgerillidae
- Vitrinidae

== Cladogram ==
A cladogram shows the phylogenic relation of this superfamily to other superfamilies in the limacoid clade:

- limacoid clade
  - Staffordioidea
    Staffordiidae
  - - - Dyakioidea
        Dyakiidae
      - Gastrodontoidea
        - Pristilomatidae
        - - Chronidae
          - - Euconulidae
            - Trochomorphidae
          - - Gastrodontidae
            - Oxychilidae
    - - Parmacelloidea
        - Trigonochlamydidae
        - Parmacellidae
        - Milacidae
      - - - Zonitoidea
            Zonitidae
          - Helicarionoidea
            - Helicarionidae
            - - Ariophantidae
              - Urocyclidae
        - Limacoidea
          - Vitrinidae
          - - Boettgerillidae
            - - Limacidae
              - Agriolimacidae
