= Wildlife of South Asia =

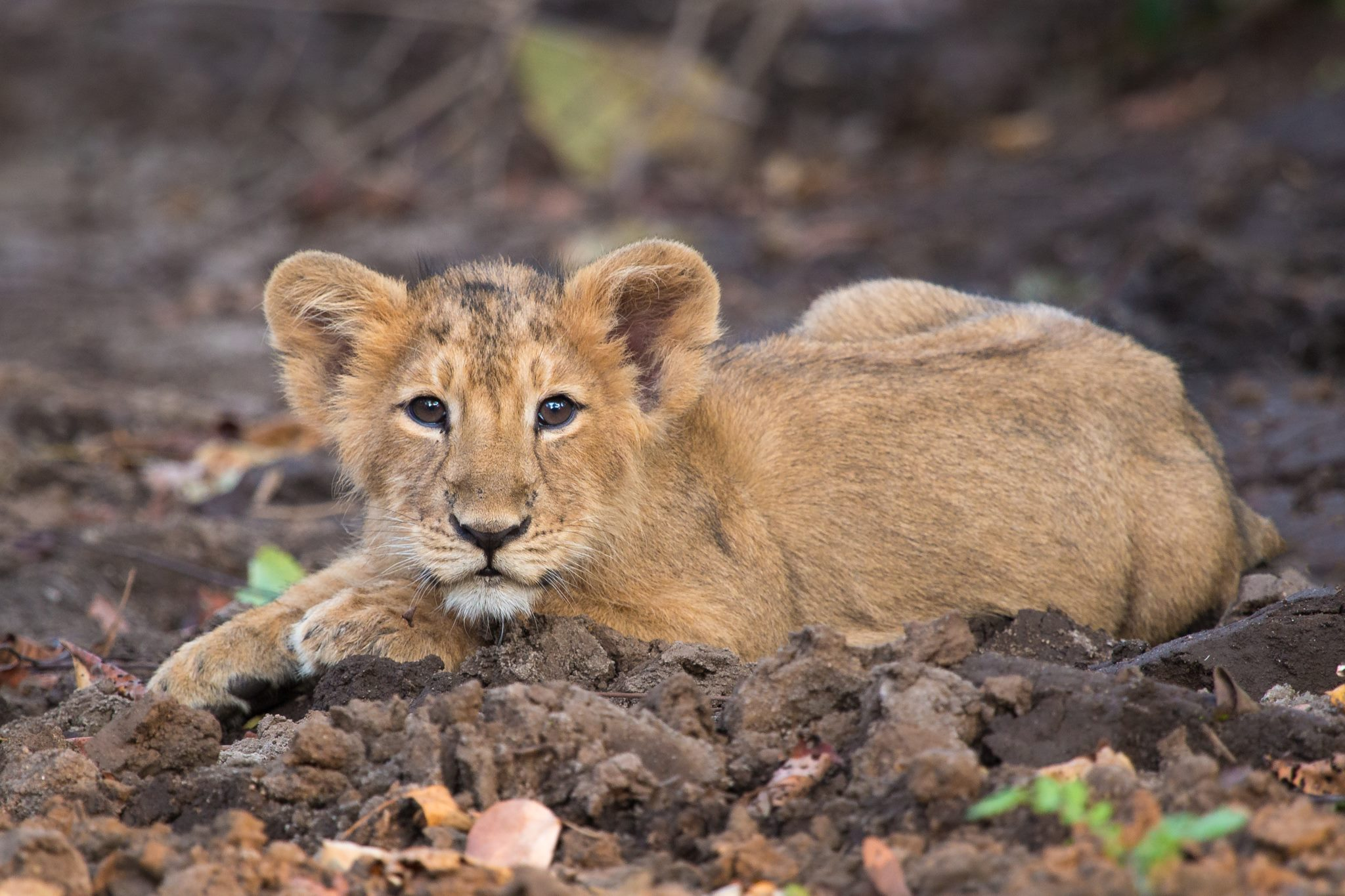
An Asiatic lion cub in Gir Forest National Park, India

The wildlife of South Asia encompasses that of India, Pakistan, Nepal, Bhutan, Bangladesh, Sri Lanka, Afghanistan and the Maldives.

- Wildlife of India
- Wildlife of Pakistan
- Wildlife of Nepal
- Wildlife of Bhutan
- Wildlife of Bangladesh
- Wildlife of Sri Lanka
- Wildlife of Maldives
- Wildlife of Afghanistan
- Wildlife conservation
- Fauna of India
- Flora of India
- List of fishes of India
- Ecoregions of India
- The study of natural history in India
- Asiatic Lion Reintroduction Project
- List of zoos in India
- Central Zoo Authority of India (CZA)
- Zoo Outreach Organisation (ZOO), India is an NGO
- Wildlife Institute of India (WII)
- Indian Institute of Forest Management (IIFM)
- Zoological Survey of India (ZSI)
- India Nature Watch (INW) spreading the love of nature and wildlife in India through photography
- Geological Survey of India (GSI) also maintains two fossil parks
- Fossil parks in India
- Protected areas of India
- List of protected areas in India
  - National parks of India
  - Biosphere reserves of India
  - Conservation areas of India
  - Wildlife sanctuaries of India
  - Reserved forests and protected forests of India
  - Conservation reserves and community reserves of India
  - Communal forests of India, including
    - Sacred groves of India
    - Social forestry in India
  - Private protected areas of India
- Environmental policy of India
  - Indian Forest Act, 1927
  - Wildlife Protection Act of 1972
  - Project Tiger
  - Project Elephant
- Ministry of Environment and Forests (India)
