= Cryptozona =

- Cryptozona siamensis (Pfeiffer, 1856)

Scientific classification
- Kingdom: Animalia
- Phylum: Mollusca
- Class: Gastropoda
- Order: Stylommatophora
- Family: Ariophantidae
- Genus: Cryptozona; Mörch, 1872

Synonyms
- Ariophanta (Cryptozona) Mörch, 1872; Nanina (Cryptozona) Mörch, 1872; Nilgiria Godwin-Austen, 1888; Xestina Pfeffer, 1878

Genus of gastropods

Cryptozona is a genus of air-breathing land snails, terrestrial pulmonate gastropod mollusks in the family Ariophantidae. These snails are restricted to South India and Sri Lanka.

Twenty five species are recognized.

== Species ==
- Cryptozona albata (W.T. Blanford, 1880)
- Cryptozona basilessa (W.H. Benson, 1865)
- Cryptozona belangeri (G.P. Deshayes)
- Cryptozona bistrialis (H.H. Beck, 1837)
- Cryptozona ceraria (W.H. Benson, 1853)
- Cryptozona ceylanica (L. Pfeiffer)
- Cryptozona chenui (L. Pfeiffer, 1847)
- Cryptozona chrysoraphe O.F. von Möllendorff
- Cryptozona crossei (L. Pfeiffer, 1862)
- Cryptozona danae (L. Pfeiffer, 1862)
- Cryptozona dohrniana (L. Pfeiffer)
- Cryptozona granulosa (O.F. von Möllendorff)
- Cryptozona inflata (O.F. von Möllendorff)
- Cryptozona juliana (J.E. Gray, 1834)
- Cryptozona ligulata (A.E.J. Férussac, 1821)
- Cryptozona maderaspatana (J.E. Gray, 1834)
- Cryptozona menglunensis C. Chen, S.P. Zhang & X.T. Ma, 1995
- Cryptozona naninoides (W.H. Benson)
- Cryptozona novella (L. Pfeiffer, 1854)
- Cryptozona pharangensis (O.F. von Möllendorff, 1901)
- Cryptozona promiscua (E.A. Smith, 1895)
- Cryptozona rugosissima O.F. von Möllendorff, 1903
- Cryptozona semirugata (H.H. Beck, 1837)
- Cryptozona sisparica (W.T. Blanford, 1866)
- Cryptozona solata (W.H. Benson, 1848)
