= Varadia amboliensis =

Scientific classification
- Kingdom: Animalia
- Phylum: Mollusca
- Class: Gastropoda
- Order: Stylommatophora
- Family: Ariophantidae
- Subfamily: Macrochlamydinae
- Genus: Varadia; Bhosale & Raheem, 2021
- Species: V. amboliensis

Binomial name
- Varadia amboliensis Bhosale, Thackeray, Muley & Raheem, 2021

Species of gastropod

Varadia amboliensis is a forest-living species of semi-slug belonging to the family Ariophantidae and was discovered in a Maharashtrian section of the Western Ghats in 2021. The species is currently the only member of the newly created genus, Varadia, named in honor of the Indian conservationist and herpetologist, Varad Giri. The species name is derived from Amboli, which is the locality where it was first identified.

== Description, habitat and behavior ==
Varadia amboliensis is glossy grey or greyish-white with irregular dark mottling patterns, and up to 6.9 cm long, with a golden-brown shell. It is more active at night, and appears to be omnivorous, as it has been observed feeding on both decaying plant matter as well as smaller invertebrates like crickets and earthworms. It is primarily terrestrial, but can be seen on leaves, rocks and on walls depending on the climate and other factors. It is endemic to the Northern and Central Western Ghats of India, preferring tropical Evergreen forests or Semi-evergreen forests.
