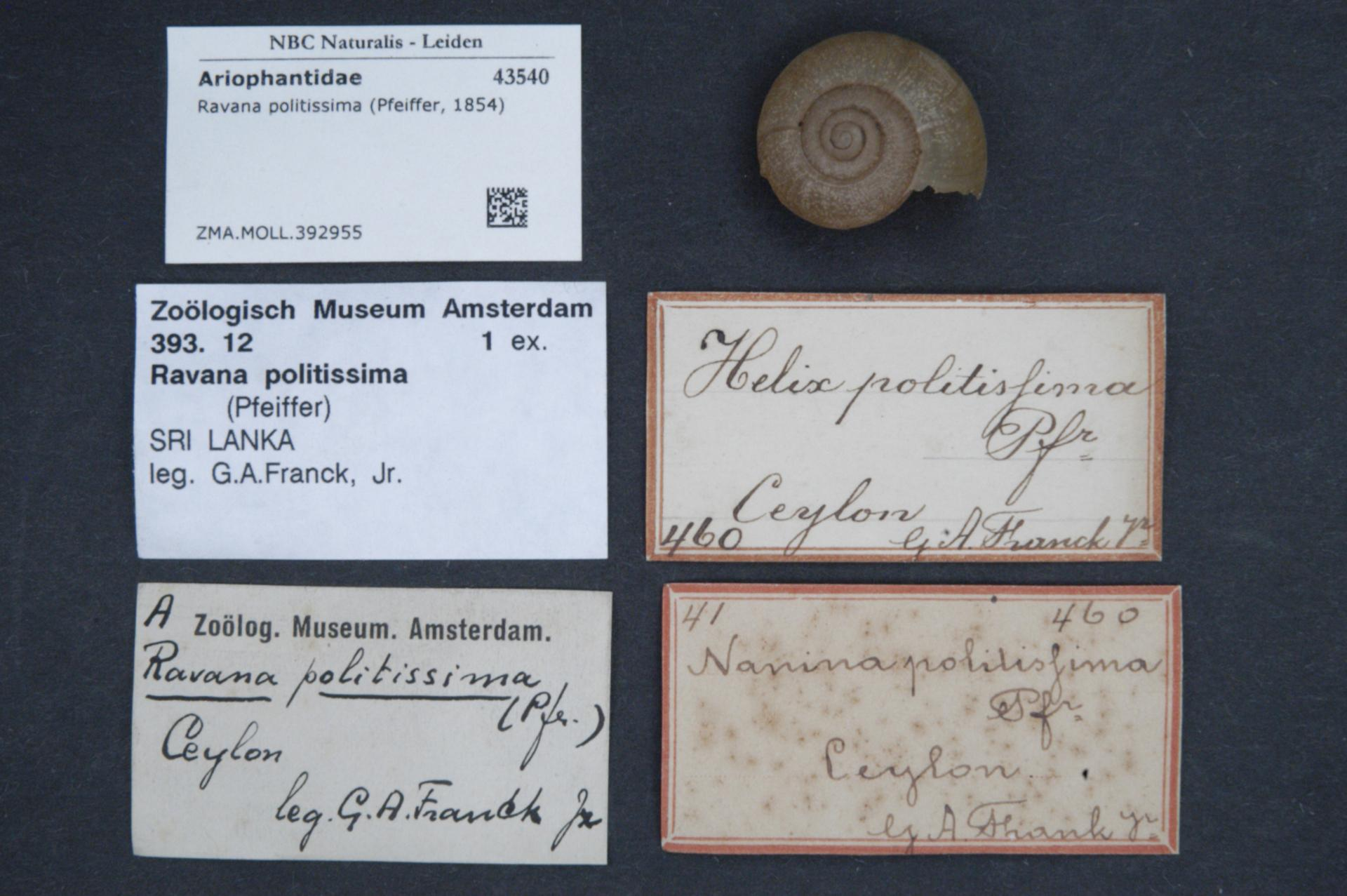
- Mollusc shell

Scientific classification
- Kingdom: Animalia
- Phylum: Mollusca
- Class: Gastropoda
- Order: Stylommatophora
- Family: Ariophantidae
- Subfamily: Ariophantinae
- Genus: Ravana; Godwin-Austen, 1901
- Species: R. politissima

Binomial name
- Ravana politissima (Pfeiffer, 1854)

= Ravana politissima =

Species of gastropod

Ravana politissima is a species of air-breathing land slug, a terrestrial pulmonate gastropod mollusc in the family Ariophantidae. Ravana is a monotypic genus, which is endemic to island of Sri Lanka. They are considered endangered due to habitat destruction.

The generic name is due to early Sri Lanka king Ravan.
