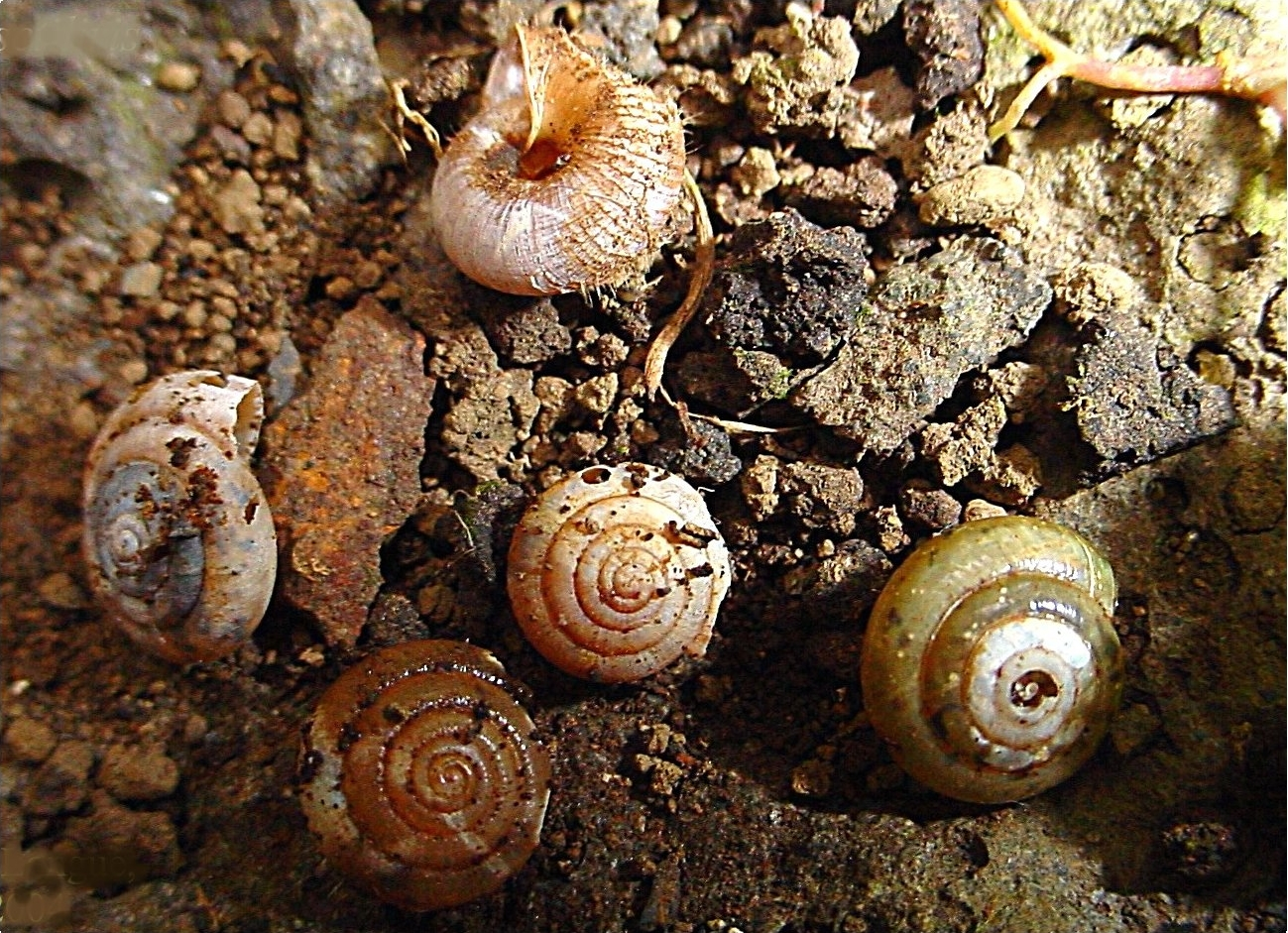
- Five worn shells of Erepta setiliris in the family Helicarionidae, at Réunion island

Scientific classification
- Kingdom: Animalia
- Phylum: Mollusca
- Class: Gastropoda
- Order: Stylommatophora
- Suborder: Helicina
- Infraorder: Limacoidei
- Superfamily: Helicarionoidea; Bourguignat, 1877

Families
- See text

= Helicarionoidea =

Superfamily of gastropods

Helicarionoidea is a superfamily of air-breathing land snails and semi-slugs, terrestrial pulmonate gastropod mollusks in the infraorder Limacoidei.

== Families ==
There are three families within the superfamily Helicarionoidea:

- Helicarionidae
- Ariophantidae
- Urocyclidae

== Cladogram ==
The following cladogram shows the phylogenic relationships of this family to other families within the limacoid clade:

- limacoid clade
  - Staffordioidea
    Staffordiidae
  - - - Dyakioidea
        Dyakiidae
      - Gastrodontoidea
        - Pristilomatidae
        - - Chronidae
          - - Euconulidae
            - Trochomorphidae
          - - Gastrodontidae
            - Oxychilidae
    - - Parmacelloidea
        - Trigonochlamydidae
        - Parmacellidae
        - Milacidae
      - - - Zonitoidea
            Zonitidae
          - Helicarionoidea
            - Helicarionidae
            - - Ariophantidae
              - Urocyclidae
        - Limacoidea
          - Vitrinidae
          - - Boettgerillidae
            - - Limacidae
              - Agriolimacidae

== Genera ==
Genera of helicarionoids unassigned to families include:

- Pseudosaphtia de Winter, 2008
- Saphtia de Winter, 2008
- Vanmolia de Winter, 2008
