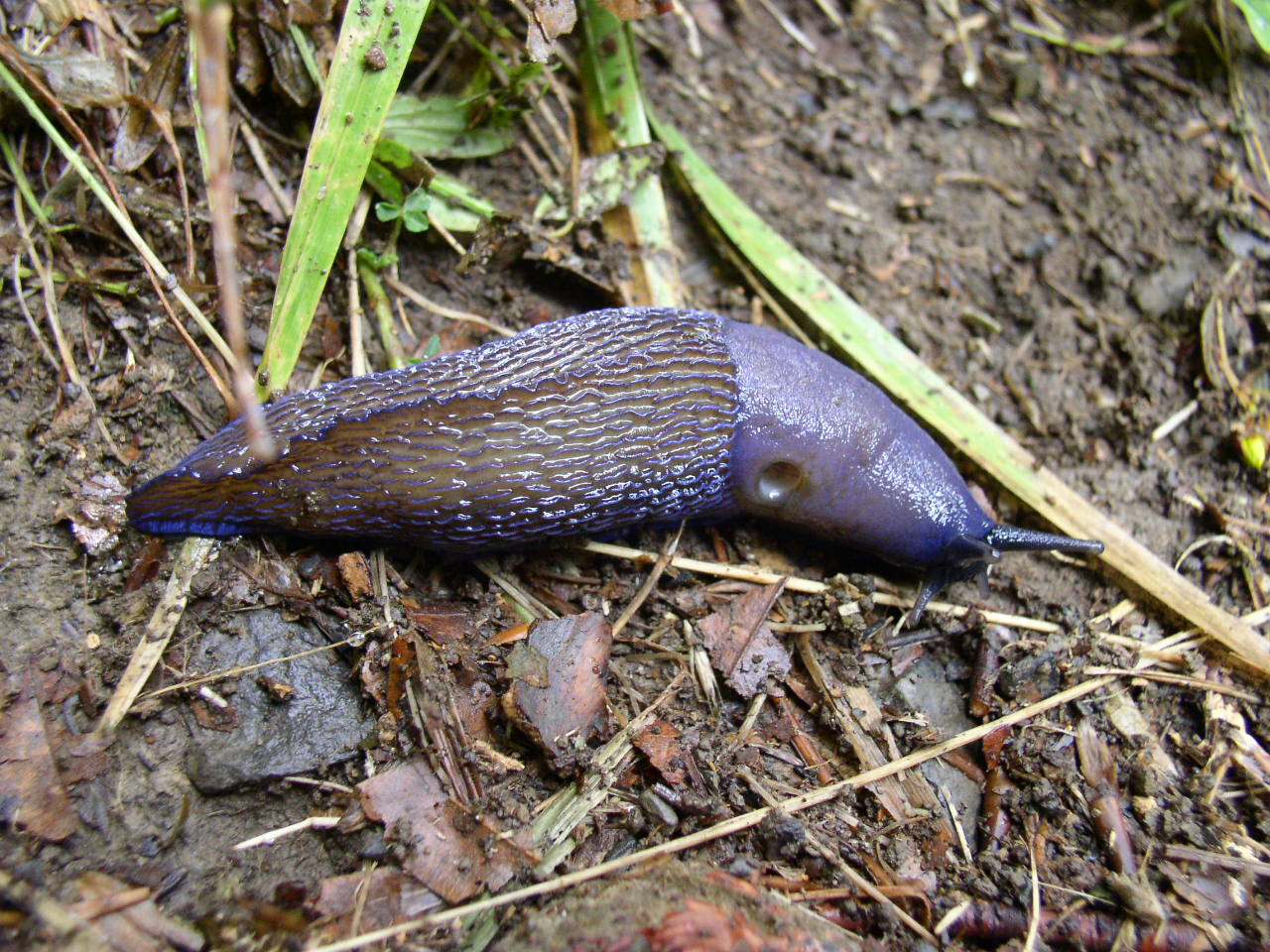
- A live individual of Bielzia coerulans in the Limacidae

Scientific classification
- Kingdom: Animalia
- Phylum: Mollusca
- Class: Gastropoda
- Superorder: Eupulmonata
- Order: Stylommatophora
- Suborder: Helicina
- Infraorder: Limacoidei

Superfamilies
- See text

= Limacoidei =

Limacoidei Temporal range: Cretaceous–Recent

Group of molluscs

The Limacoidei is a taxonomic infraorder of air-breathing land snails, semislugs and slugs, terrestrial pulmonate gastropod molluscs in the suborder Helicina.

== Distribution ==
The original ancestral area of limacoid families is thought to be the Palearctic region and south-eastern Asia.

== Etymology ==
The word "limacoid" means "resembling a slug".

== Typography of the name ==
In 1998, for the same taxon, Hausdorf used the name Limacoidea sensu lato.

The name of this taxon, the limacoid clade, was written by Bouchet & Rocroi (2005) with quotation marks like this: "limacoid clade".

Other typographical variants are used by various other authors, for example capitalizing and restricting the use of the quote marks thus: "Limacoid" clade and "Limacoid clade".

== 2003 taxonomy by Schileyko ==
The study of A. Schileyko in this group, published in parts 8–11 of his monograph between 2002 and 2003, did not discuss the system that Hausdorf had proposed. However, Schileyko refers to the work of Hausdorf, where this system was proposed, in part 10 (2003) on p. 1390. So he was acquainted with this system before 2003.

Alternative taxonomy is as follows (subfamilies listed only for Helicarionidae and Zonitidae):

- Superfamily Helicarionoidea
  - Family Euconulidae
  - Family Trochomorphidae
  - Family Helicarionidae
    - Subfamily Geotrochinae
    - Subfamily Helicarioninae
    - Subfamily Papuarioninae
    - Subfamily Urocyclinae
  - Family Gymnarionidae
  - Family Rhysotinidae
  - Family Ariophantidae
  - Family Ostracolethidae
  - Family Ryssotidae
  - Family Milacidae
- Superfamily Dyakioidea
  - Family Dyakiidae
  - Family Staffordiidae
- Superfamily Gastrodontoidea
  - Family Gastrodontidae
- Superfamily Zonitoidea
  - Family Zonitidae
    - Subfamily Pristilomatinae
    - Subfamily Godwiniinae
    - Subfamily Zonitinae
    - Subfamily Oxychilinae
  - Family Daudebardiidae
  - Family Parmacellidae
- Superfamily Trigonochlamydoidea
  - Family Trigonochlamydidae
- Superfamily Vitrinoidea
  - Family Vitrinidae
- Superfamily Limacoidea
  - Family Limacidae
  - Family Agriolimacidae
  - Family Boettgerillidae

Moreover, after these groups, in the same infraorder Limacoinei, Schileyko listed six more superfamilies: Camaenoidea, Xanthonychoidea, Helicoidea, Polygyroidea, Hygromioidea and Arionoidea.

== 2005 taxonomy by Bouchet & Rocroi ==
=== Explanatory note ===
For this particular group of families, Bouchet & Rocroi adapted the taxonomic approach which was originally published by German malacologist Bernhard Hausdorf in 1998 in the Journal of Molluscan Studies. Bouchet & Rocroi clearly state, on p. 283:

The "limacoid clade" includes the families Staffordioidea, Dyakioidea, Gastrodontoidea, Parmacelloidea, Zonitoidea, Helicarionoidea and Limacoidea. Contents and classification after Hausdorf (1998).

However, in their paper, Bouchet & Rocroi (apparently accidentally) failed to show, graphically or typographically, any coverage of the limacoid clade in the taxonomic section of their paper, on pp. 268–269.

Because of this omission, some authors have subsequently (mistakenly) included in the "limacoid clade" the two following superfamilies: Arionoidea and Helicoidea. This misunderstanding was copied by Poppe & Tagaro (2006) who attempted to explain the changes within this taxonomy to the public. This same error is reproduced in various other internet sources.

=== Taxonomic list ===
The taxonomy of Bouchet and Rocroi shows the "limacoid clade" as follows:

(Families that are exclusively fossil are indicated with a dagger †)

- Superfamily Staffordioidea
  - Family Staffordiidae
- Superfamily Dyakioidea
  - Family Dyakiidae
- Superfamily Gastrodontoidea
  - Family Gastrodontidae
  - Family Chronidae
  - Family Euconulidae
  - Family Oxychilidae
  - Family Pristilomatidae
  - Family Trochomorphidae
  - Fossil taxa probably belonging to the Gastrodontoidea
    - Subfamily † Archaeozonitinae
    - Subfamily † Grandipatulinae
    - Subfamily † Palaeoxestininae
- Superfamily Parmacelloidea
  - Family Parmacellidae
  - Family Milacidae
  - Family Trigonochlamydidae
- Superfamily Zonitoidea
  - Family Zonitidae
- Superfamily Helicarionoidea
  - Family Helicarionidae
  - Family Ariophantidae
  - Family Urocyclidae
- Superfamily Limacoidea
  - Family Limacidae
  - Family Agriolimacidae
  - Family Boettgerillidae
  - Family Vitrinidae

=== Cladogram ===
A cladogram showing phylogenic relations of families in the limacoid clade:

- limacoid clade
  - Staffordioidea
    Staffordiidae
  - - - Dyakioidea
        Dyakiidae
      - Gastrodontoidea
        - Pristilomatidae
        - - Chronidae
          - - Euconulidae
            - Trochomorphidae
          - - Gastrodontidae
            - Oxychilidae
    - - Parmacelloidea
        - Trigonochlamydidae
        - Parmacellidae
        - Milacidae
      - - - Zonitoidea
            Zonitidae
          - Helicarionoidea
            - Helicarionidae
            - - Ariophantidae
              - Urocyclidae
        - Limacoidea
          - Vitrinidae
          - - Boettgerillidae
            - - Limacidae
              - Agriolimacidae

As explained in the previous section, the superfamilies Arionoidea and Helicoidea do not belong to the limacoid clade. However, they are sometimes mistakenly included in this taxon.
