= Howearion hilli =

Scientific classification
- Kingdom: Animalia
- Phylum: Mollusca
- Class: Gastropoda
- Order: Stylommatophora
- Superfamily: Helicarionoidea
- Family: Helicarionidae
- Genus: Howearion
- Species: H. belli

Binomial name
- Howearion belli (Cox, 1873)
- Location of Lord Howe Island

Synonyms
- Helicarion hilli Cox, 1873; Howearion palmarum Iredale, 1944

Species of land snail

Howearion hilli, also known as the Lord Howe semislug, is a species of semislug that is endemic to Australia's Lord Howe Island in the Tasman Sea.

== Description ==
The shell of the mature animal is 6.9–9.1 mm in height, with a diameter of 13.4–17 mm, ear-shaped with rounded, rapidly expanding whorls, and with flattened spire and apex. It is glossy and golden in colouration. The umbilicus is closed. The aperture is ovately lunate. The animal is yellowish-cream with brown stripes and spots and tiny white flecks.

== Distribution ==
The semislug is widespread in the lowlands of the island, as well as on the lower slopes of the southern mountains.
