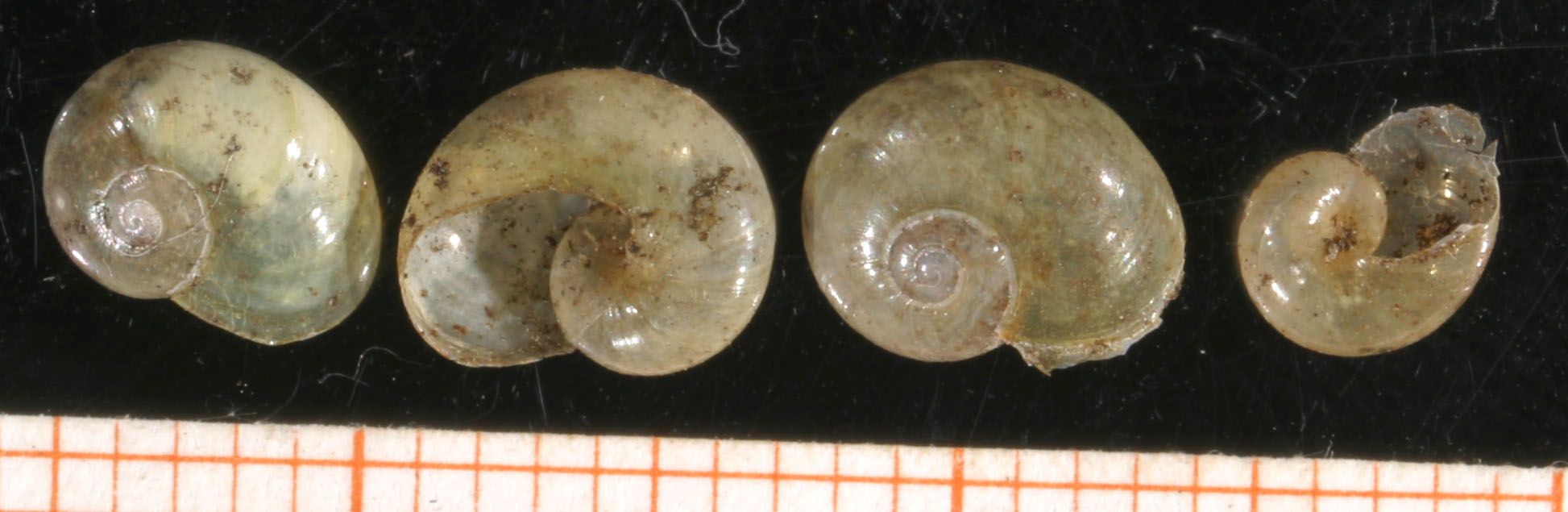
- Phenacolimax major (Férussac, 1807), Vitrinidae, Gastropoda, Mollusca, Locality: Germany: Sauerland, Hönnetal

Scientific classification
- Kingdom: Animalia
- Phylum: Mollusca
- Class: Gastropoda
- Order: Stylommatophora
- Family: Vitrinidae
- Genus: Phenacolimax
- Species: P. major

Binomial name
- Phenacolimax major (A. Férussac, 1807)

= Phenacolimax major =

Species of gastropod

Phenacolimax major is a European species of small air-breathing land snail, a terrestrial pulmonate gastropod mollusk in the family Vitrinidae.

== Distribution ==
This species is known to occur in a number of Western European countries and islands including:

- Great Britain
- Switzerland
- Germany
- and other areas
