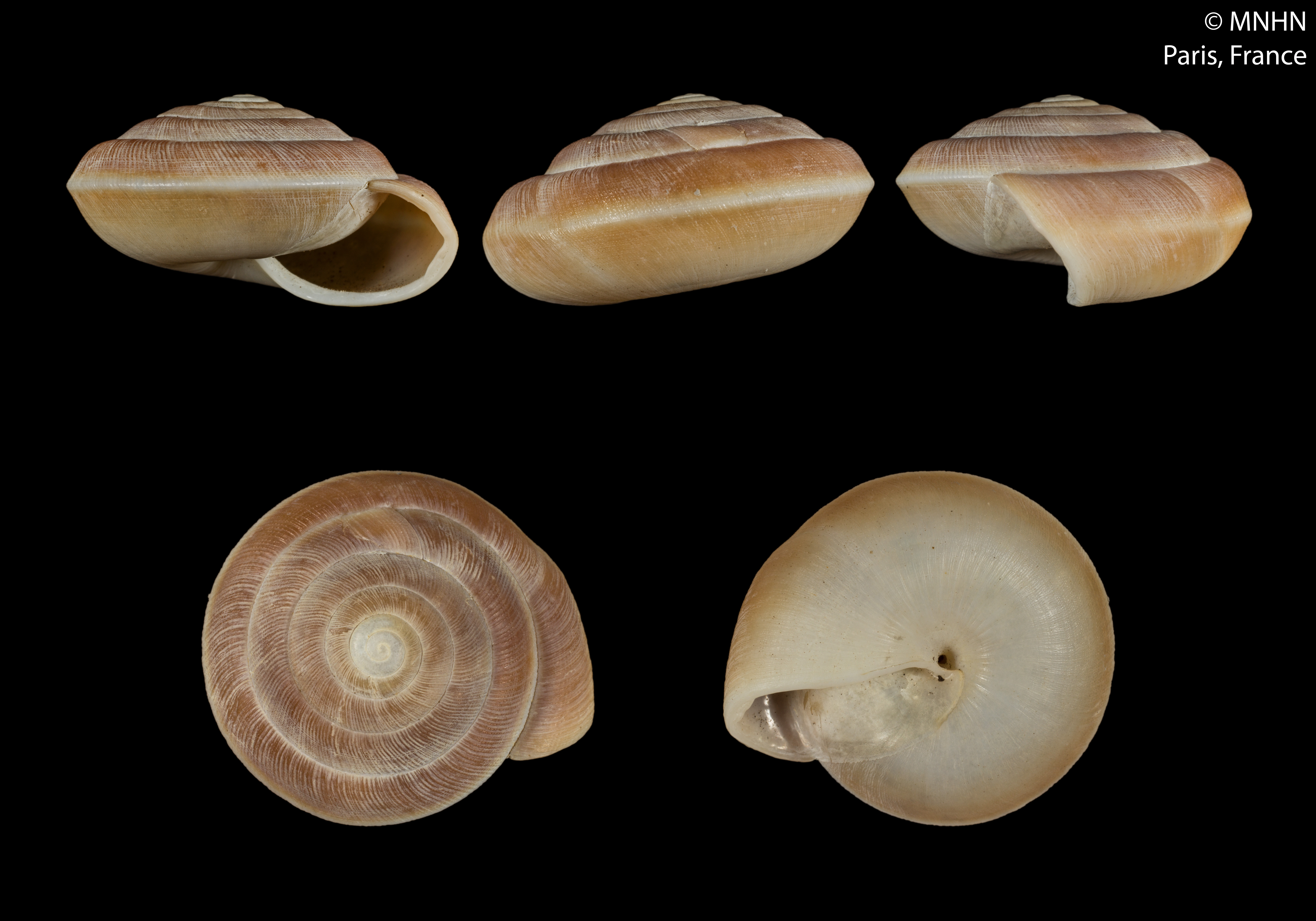
- Shell of Hemiglypta franzhuberi (holotype at MNHN, Paris)

Scientific classification
- Kingdom: Animalia
- Phylum: Mollusca
- Class: Gastropoda
- Order: Stylommatophora
- Infraorder: Limacoidei
- Superfamily: Trochomorphoidea
- Family: Chronidae
- Genus: Hemiglypta; Möllendorff, 1893

Type species
- Helix blainvilliana I. Lea, 1840

Synonyms
- Nanina (Hemiglypta) Möllendorff, 1893 (unaccepted rank)

= Hemiglypta =

Genus of molluscs

Hemiglypta is a genus of air-breathing land snails or semislugs, terrestrial pulmonate gastropod mollusks in the family Chronidae.

== Species ==
- Hemiglypta blainvilliana (I. Lea, 1840)
- Hemiglypta castaneofusca Thiele, 1928
- Hemiglypta connectens Möllendorff, 1893
- Hemiglypta cuvieriana (I. Lea, 1840)
- Hemiglypta franciscanorum Quadras & Möllendorff, 1896
- Hemiglypta franzhuberi Thach, 2018
- Hemiglypta fraterna Thiele, 1928
- Hemiglypta fulvida (L. Pfeiffer, 1842)
- Hemiglypta globosa (C. Semper, 1870)
- Hemiglypta iloilana M. Smith, 1932
- Hemiglypta infrastriata Möllendorff, 1893
- Hemiglypta mayonensis (Hidalgo, 1887)
- Hemiglypta microglypta Möllendorff, 1893
- Hemiglypta moussoni (C. Semper, 1870)
- Hemiglypta panayensis (L. Pfeiffer, 1842)
- Hemiglypta semperi Möllendorff, 1893
- Hemiglypta sororia Thiele, 1928
- Hemiglypta webbi Bartsch, 1919

Species brought into synonymy

- Hemiglypta blainvilleana (I. Lea, 1840): synonym of Hemiglypta blainvilliana (I. Lea, 1840) (unjustified emendation of the original name)
- Hemiglypta semiglobosa (L. Pfeiffer, 1845): synonym of Hemiglypta fulvida semiglobosa (L. Pfeiffer, 1845) (reversed priority)
