= Trochochlamys ogasawarana =

Conservation status
- Critically Endangered (IUCN 2.3)

Scientific classification
- Kingdom: Animalia
- Phylum: Mollusca
- Class: Gastropoda
- Order: Stylommatophora
- Family: Chronidae
- Genus: Trochochlamys
- Species: T. ogasawarana

Binomial name
- Trochochlamys ogasawarana (Pilsbry, 1902)

Synonyms
- Kaliella ogasawarana Pilsbry, 1902

Species of gastropod

Trochochlamys ogasawarana is a species of small air-breathing land snail, a terrestrial pulmonate gastropod mollusc in the family Chronidae.

The survival of this land snail species is critically endangered.

== Distribution ==
This species is endemic to Japan.
