= Parmellops perspicuus =

- Lord Howe Island Map

Scientific classification
- Domain: Eukaryota
- Kingdom: Animalia
- Phylum: Mollusca
- Class: Gastropoda
- Order: Stylommatophora
- Family: Helicarionidae
- Subfamily: Helicarioninae
- Genus: Parmellops
- Species: P. perspicuus

Binomial name
- Parmellops perspicuus Hyman & Ponder, 2016
- Location of Lord Howe Island

Species of land snail

Parmellops perspicuus, also known as the transparent semislug, is a species of semislug that is endemic to Australia's Lord Howe Island in the Tasman Sea.

== Description ==
The shell of the mature animal is reduced, plate-like and only faintly visible, 0.5 mm in height, with a diameter of 11.7 mm, reddish in colour. The animal is white with a grey tail, the shell clearly visible through the lappets.

== Distribution ==
The semislug is only found on the summit of Mount Gower, crawling on palm leaves and trunks at night and after rain.
