= Plutonia =

Plutonia may refer to:

- Plutonia (gastropod), a genus of air-breathing land snails
- Vladimir Obruchev's Plutonia (Плутония) (1915)
- Psilocybe plutonia, a species of mushroom
- The Plutonia Experiment, a WAD made for Final Doom
- Plutonium(IV) oxide
- The island Plutonia in The Journey to Melonia where the greedy capitalists Slug and Slagg rule
