= Semilimax semilimax =

- Semilimax semilimax shells

Scientific classification
- Kingdom: Animalia
- Phylum: Mollusca
- Class: Gastropoda
- Order: Stylommatophora
- Family: Vitrinidae
- Genus: Semilimax
- Species: S. semilimax

Binomial name
- Semilimax semilimax (J. Férussac, 1802)

Species of gastropod

Semilimax semilimax is a species of air-breathing land snail, a terrestrial pulmonate gastropod mollusk in the family Vitrinidae.

== Distribution ==
This species occurs in:

- Czech Republic
- Ukraine
