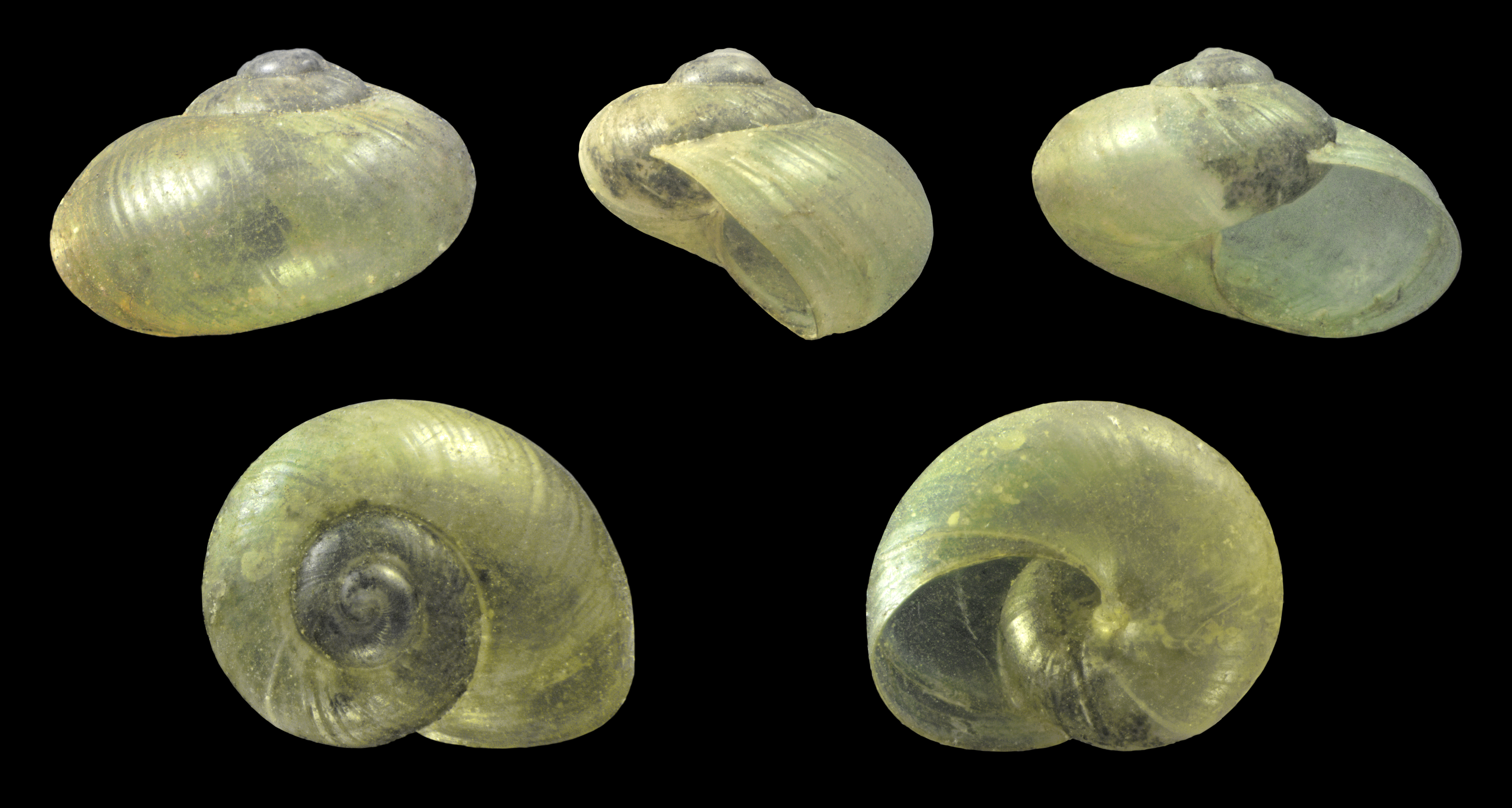
- Shells of Vitrina pellucida

Conservation status
- Least Concern (IUCN 3.1)

- Secure (NatureServe)

Scientific classification
- Kingdom: Animalia
- Phylum: Mollusca
- Class: Gastropoda
- Order: Stylommatophora
- Family: Vitrinidae
- Subfamily: Vitrininae
- Genus: Vitrina
- Species: V. pellucida

Binomial name
- Vitrina pellucida (O. F. Müller, 1774)

Synonyms
- Helix domestica Strøm, 1765 (nomen oblitum); Helix elliptica T. Brown, 1818 junior subjective synonym; Helix limacoides v. Alten, 1812 (junior synonym); Helix pellucida O. F. Müller, 1774 · (original combination); Hyalina pellucida (O. F. Müller, 1774) ·; Vitrina (Vitrina) pellucida (O. F. Müller, 1774) ·; Vitrina alaskana Dall, 1905 ·; Vitrina alpina Gredler, 1856 junior subjective synonym; Vitrina beryllina C. Pfeiffer, 1821 (junior synonym); Vitrina bielzi M. Kimakowicz, 1890 (junior synonym); Vitrina depressa Jeffreys, 1830 junior subjective synonym; Vitrina globosa O. Boettger, 1880 junior subjective synonym; Vitrina hiemalis C. Koch, 1876 junior subjective synonym; Vitrina muelleri Jeffreys, 1830 junior subjective synonym; Vitrina pellucida var. bellardii Pollonera, 1884 junior subjective synonym; Vitrina pellucida var. brunnensis Uličný, 1883 junior subjective synonym; Vitrina pellucida var. perforata Westerlund, 1876 junior subjective synonym; Vitrina pfeifferi Newcomb, 1861 (homonym; non Deshayes, 1851); Vitrina rhodopensis A. J. Wagner, 1911 (junior synonym); Vitrina servainiana Saint-Simon, 1870 junior subjective synonym

= Vitrina pellucida =

Western glass-snail

Species of gastropod

Vitrina pellucida is species of small land snail, a terrestrial pulmonate gastropod mollusk in the family Vitrinidae.

== Description ==
This species is a 'semi-slug' with a flattened, globular shell. The animal is pale grey with a darker head and tentacles. The body is large in comparison with the shell, and cannot completely retreat into the shell. The shell is subglobose, spherical but not a completely round ball, somewhat smooth, transparent, and greenish hyaline in colour. The shell has 3 whorls that enlarge rapidly and are somewhat convex. The body whorl is wide and a little flattened below. The suture or groove is wrinkled. The aperture is lunately rounded or shaped like a half-moon. The umbilicus is very small.

The width of the shell is 6 mm, the height is 3.5 mm.

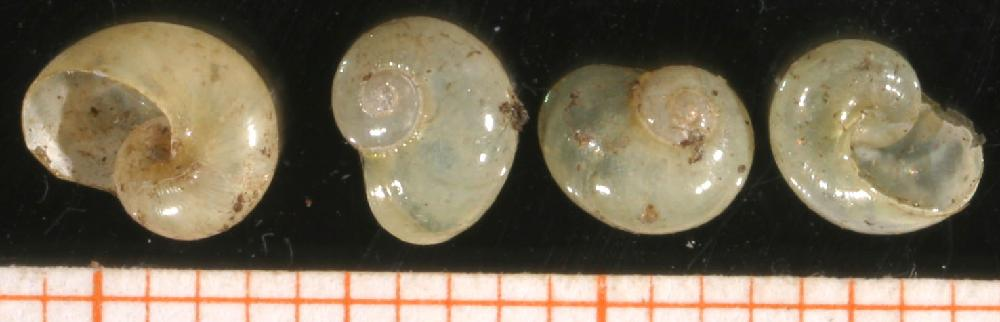
4 shells of Vitrina pellucida, scale bar is in mm

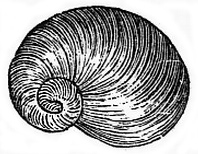
Apical view of the shell of Vitrina pellucida.

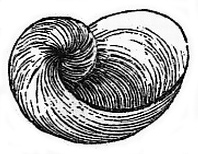
Umbilical view of the shell of Vitrina pellucida.

== Distribution ==
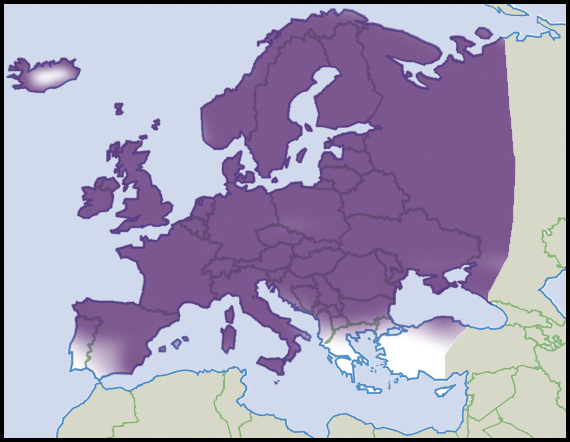
Distribution of Vitrina pellucida in Europe

This species is known to occur in a number of countries and islands in Western and Central Europe, including:

- Bulgaria
- Czech Republic
- Netherlands
- Poland
- Slovakia
- Ukraine
- Great Britain
- Ireland
- and other areas

== Ecology ==
This snail is eaten by hedgehogs.

This species eats liverworts (Jungermanniaceae) and decayed leaves. It will also eat dead earthworms and horse manure.

These snails live in moist and shady places, but are not usually observed until late in the autumn. These snails occur both in natural and modified habitats, such as in meadows and grasslands, in deciduous and coniferous forests, and in wasteground.

The eggs are deposited in small heaps, and have a membraneous covering.

Parasites of Vitrina pellucida include Elaphostrongylus spp.
