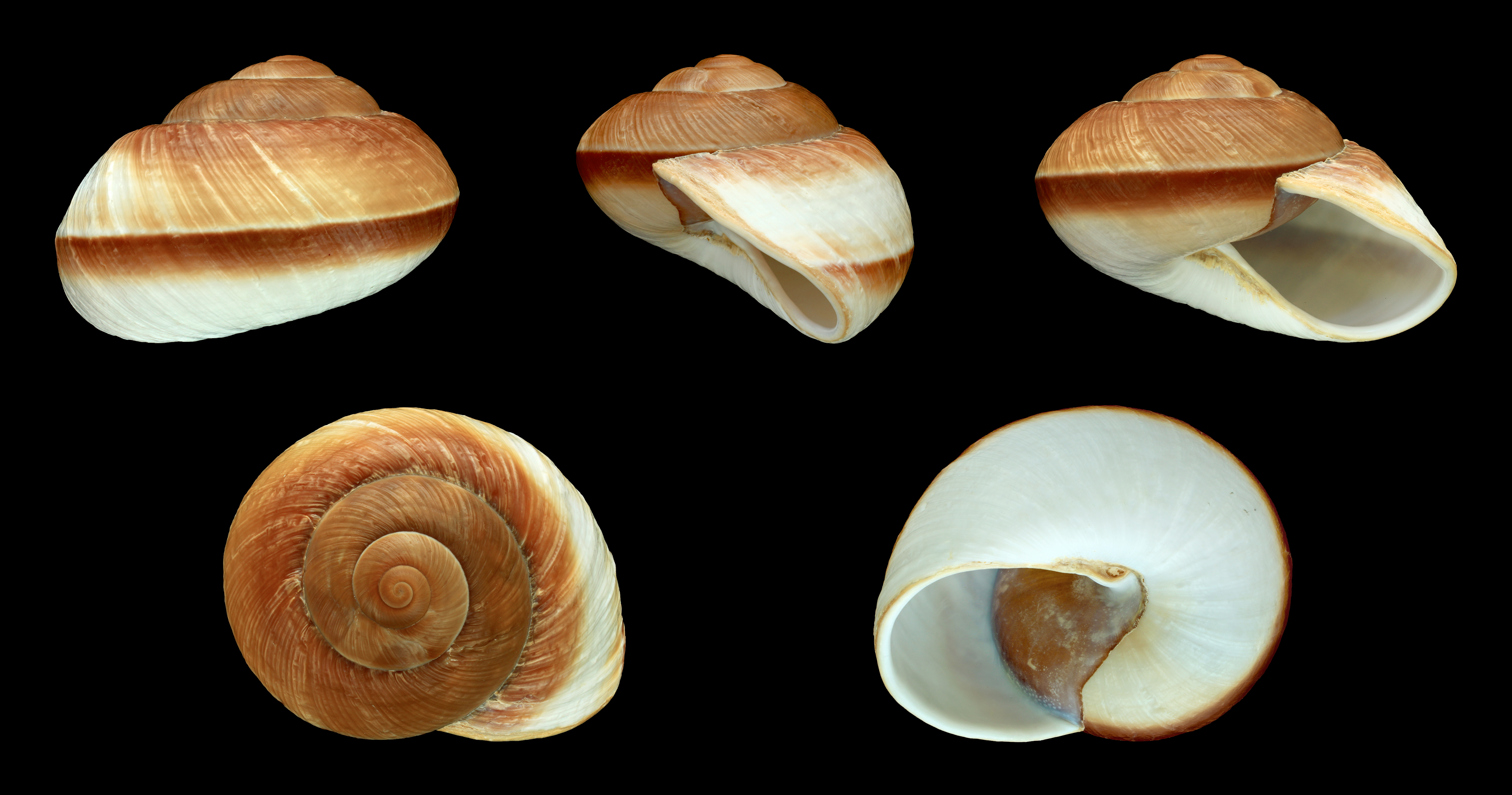
- Five views of a shell of muffin snail Ryssota ovum

Scientific classification
- Kingdom: Animalia
- Phylum: Mollusca
- Class: Gastropoda
- Order: Stylommatophora
- Infraorder: Limacoidei
- Superfamily: Trochomorphoidea
- Family: Chronidae
- Genus: Ryssota; Albers, 1850

Type species
- Helix ovum Valenciennes, 1827

Synonyms
- Nanina (Ryssota) Albers, 1850 (original rank); Rhysota Martens, 1860 (unjustified emendation of the original name); Rhysota (Rhysota) Martens, 1860 (unjustified emendation to original name); Rhyssota auct. (invalid: unjustified emendation of the original name)

= Ryssota =

Genus of gastropods

Ryssota is a genus of air-breathing land snails, terrestrial pulmonate gastropod molluscs in the family Chronidae.

== Species ==
Species within the genus Ryssota include:

- Ryssota antoni (Semper, 1870)
- Ryssota dvitija (O. Semper, 1866)
- Ryssota gervaisii (Dubrueil, 1867)
- Ryssota mororum Pilsbry, 1924
- Ryssota mulleri (Pfeiffer,1854)
- Ryssota otaheitana (Férussac, 1820)
- Ryssota sagittifera (L. Pfeiffer, 1842)
- Ryssota sauli Bartsch, 1938
- Ryssota uranus (L. Pfeiffer, 1861)
- Ryssota webbi Bartsch, 1938

Species brought into synonymy

- Ryssota balerana (Bartsch, 1939): synonym of Lamarckiella balerana (Bartsch, 1939) (original combination)
- Ryssota lamarckiana (Lea, 1853): synonym of Lamarckiella stolephora lamarckiana (I. Lea, 1840) (superseded combination)
- Ryssota maxima (Pfeiffer, 1853): synonym of Pararyssota maxima (L. Pfeiffer, 1854) (superseded combination)
- Ryssota ovum (Valenciennes, 1827): synonym of Ryssota otaheitana ovum (Valenciennes, 1827)
- Ryssota oweniana (Pfeiffer, 1853): synonym of Lamarckiella oweniana (L. Pfeiffer, 1854) (superseded combination)
- Ryssota pachystoma (Hombron & Jacquinot, 1841): synonym of Trukrhysa pachystoma (Hombron & Jacquinot, 1841) (superseded combination)
- Ryssota porphyria (Pfeiffer, 1854): synonym of Lamarckiella porphyria (L. Pfeiffer, 1842) (superseded combination)
- Ryssota quadrasi (Hidalgo, 1890): synonym of Pararyssota quadrasi (Hidalgo, 1887) (superseded combination)
- Ryssota rhea (Pfeiffer, 1853): synonym of Ryssota otaheitana rhea (L. Pfeiffer, 1855)
- Ryssota zeus (Jonas, 1842): synonym of Lamarckiella zeus (Jonas, 1843) (superseded combination)
