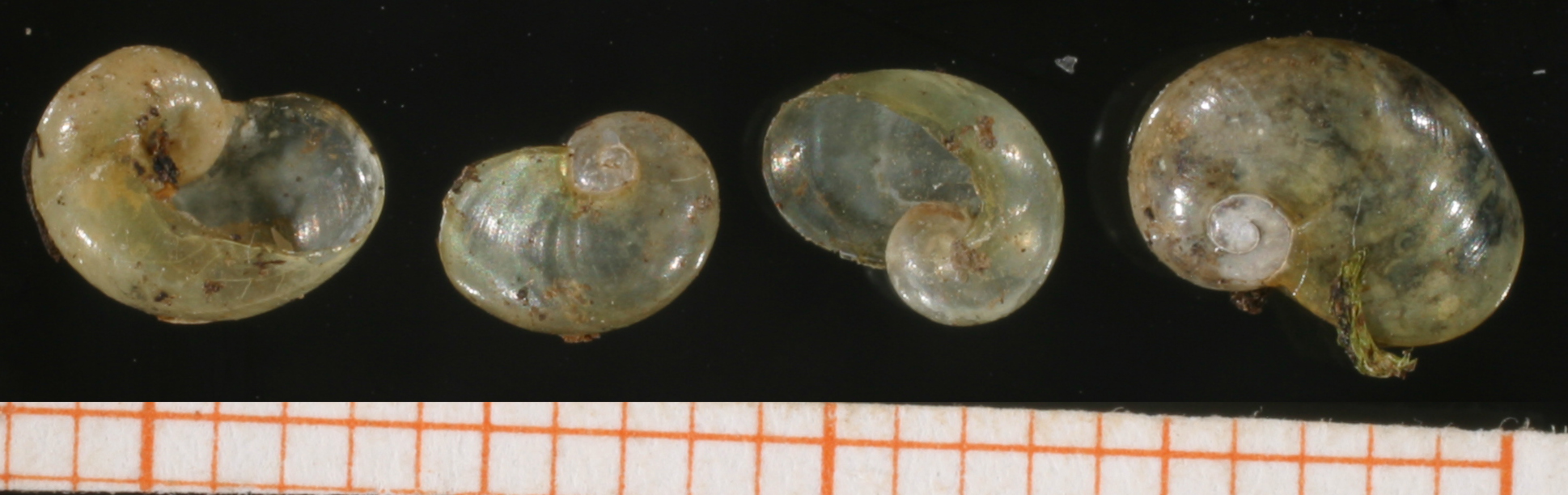

Scientific classification
- Kingdom: Animalia
- Phylum: Mollusca
- Class: Gastropoda
- Order: Stylommatophora
- Family: Vitrinidae
- Genus: Eucobresia
- Species: E. glacialis

Binomial name
- Eucobresia glacialis (Forbes, 1837)

= Eucobresia glacialis =

Species of gastropod

Eucobresia glacialis is a species of gastropod belonging to the family Vitrinidae.

The species is found in Central Europe.
