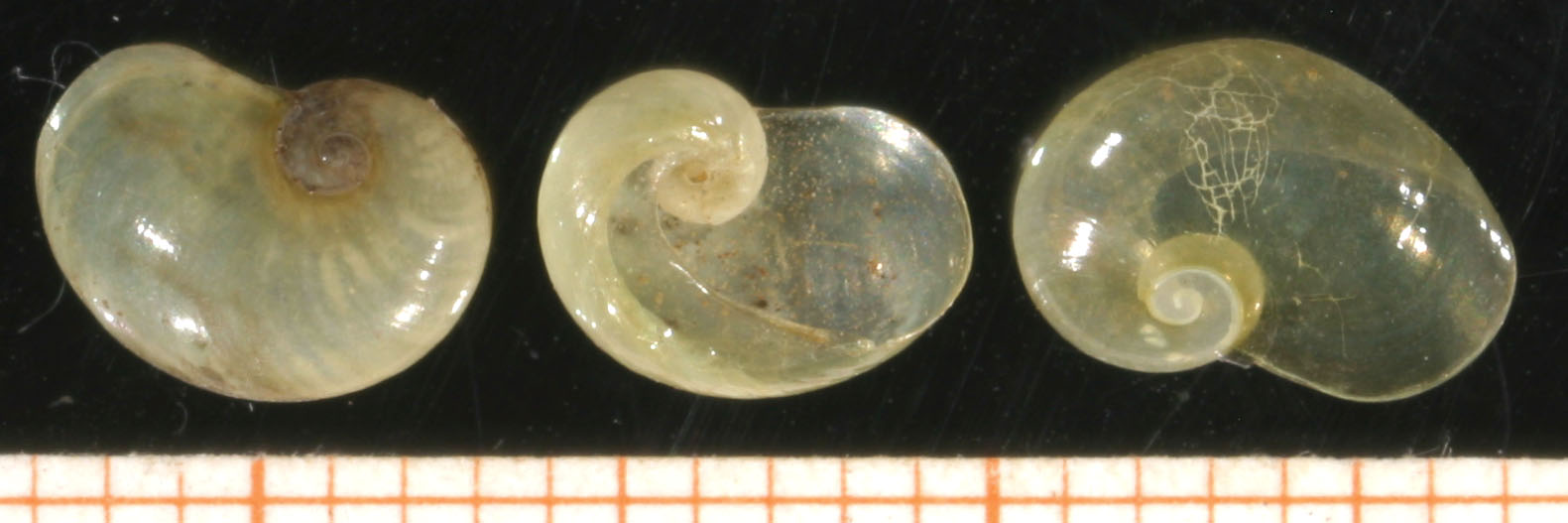
- Three shells of Eucobresia diaphana

Conservation status
- Least Concern (IUCN 3.1)

Scientific classification
- Kingdom: Animalia
- Phylum: Mollusca
- Class: Gastropoda
- Order: Stylommatophora
- Family: Vitrinidae
- Genus: Eucobresia
- Species: E. diaphana

Binomial name
- Eucobresia diaphana (Draparnaud, 1805)

= Eucobresia diaphana =

Species of gastropod

Eucobresia diaphana is a species of small air-breathing land snail or semi-slug in the terrestrial pulmonate gastropod mollusk family Vitrinidae.

== Habitat ==
This species lives in damp places, such as under leaves.

== Shell description ==
The shell of this species is very delicate, translucent, and yellowish in color. It has a large aperture. The shell is about 7 millimeters long and 4.5 wide.

== Distribution ==
This species is widespread and abundant in much of Europe, where it occurs in Austria, Belgium, Bosnia and Herzegovina, Bulgaria, Croatia, the Czech Republic (where it is mainly of least concern, but near threatened in Moravia), France, Germany, Italy, Liechtenstein, Luxembourg, Montenegro, the Netherlands, Poland, Romania, Serbia, Slovakia, Slovenia, and Switzerland.
