= Phenacolimax atlantica =

Conservation status
- Least Concern (IUCN 3.1)

Scientific classification
- Kingdom: Animalia
- Phylum: Mollusca
- Class: Gastropoda
- Order: Stylommatophora
- Family: Vitrinidae
- Genus: Phenacolimax
- Species: P. atlantica

Binomial name
- Phenacolimax atlantica (Morelet, 1860)

Species of gastropod

Phenacolimax atlantica is a species of air-breathing land snail, a terrestrial pulmonate gastropod mollusk in the family Vitrinidae.

This species is endemic to Portugal.
