= Howearion belli =

Scientific classification
- Domain: Eukaryota
- Kingdom: Animalia
- Phylum: Mollusca
- Class: Gastropoda
- Order: Stylommatophora
- Superfamily: Helicarionoidea
- Family: Helicarionidae
- Genus: Howearion
- Species: H. belli

Binomial name
- Howearion belli Iredale, 1944
- Location of Lord Howe Island

Species of land snail

Howearion belli, also known as the beautiful semislug, is a species of semislug that is endemic to Australia's Lord Howe Island in the Tasman Sea.

== Description ==
The shell of the mature animal is 6.5–8.1 mm in height, with a diameter of 13–16.6 mm, ear-shaped with rounded, rapidly expanding whorls, and with flattened spire and apex. It is smooth, glossy and deep golden-brown in colouration. The umbilicus is closed. The aperture is ovately lunate. The animal is cream, brown, or reddish-brown, with darker brown stripes and spots and tiny white flecks.

== Distribution and habitat ==
The semislug occurs on the summits and upper slopes of the southern mountains of the island, where it is found in leaf litter, usually dead palm fronds, and sometimes in living trees.
