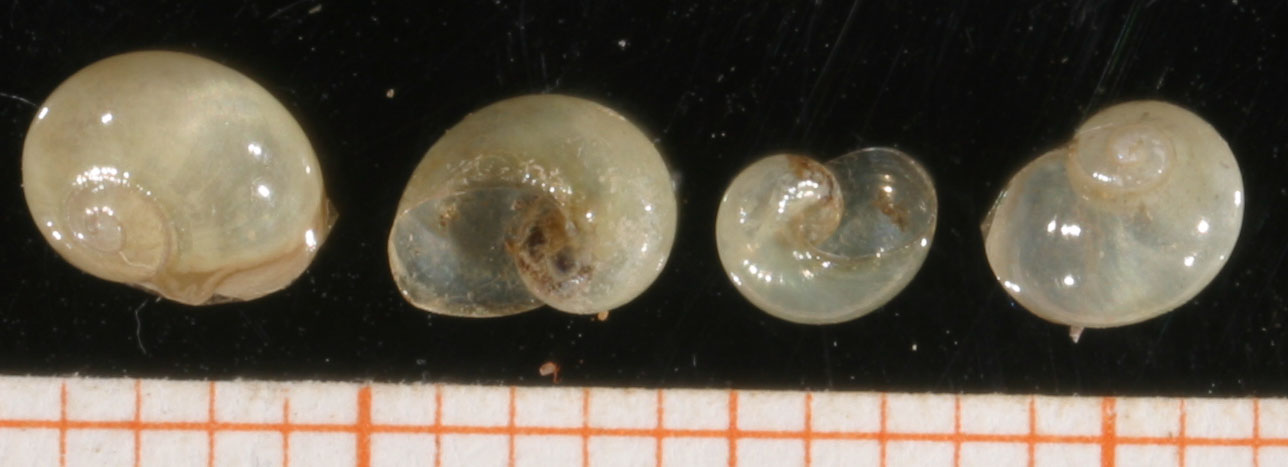

Scientific classification
- Domain: Eukaryota
- Kingdom: Animalia
- Phylum: Mollusca
- Class: Gastropoda
- Order: Stylommatophora
- Family: Vitrinidae
- Genus: Eucobresia
- Species: E. nivalis

Binomial name
- Eucobresia nivalis (Dumont & Mortillet, 1854)

Synonyms
- Vitrina nivalis Dumont & Mortillet, 1854

= Eucobresia nivalis =

Species of gastropod

Eucobresia nivalis is a species of air-breathing land snail, a terrestrial pulmonate gastropod mollusk in the family Vitrinidae, the glass snails.

== Distribution ==
This species lives in the Alps and the Carpathian Mountains in the following countries:

- Czech Republic
- Poland
- Slovakia
- Austria
- Ukraine
