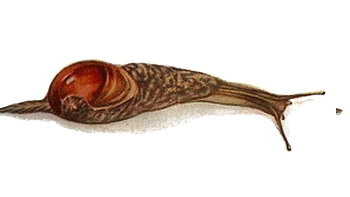

Scientific classification
- Kingdom: Animalia
- Phylum: Mollusca
- Class: Gastropoda
- Order: Stylommatophora
- Family: Vitrinidae
- Genus: Semilimax
- Species: S. pyrenaicus

Binomial name
- Semilimax pyrenaicus (A. Férussac, 1821)

Synonyms
- Vitrina hibernica J. Taylor 1908

= Semilimax pyrenaicus =

Species of gastropod

Semilimax pyrenaicus is a species of air-breathing land snail, a terrestrial pulmonate gastropod mollusk in the family Vitrinidae. It is a large greyish-brown snail that cannot fully retract into its shell.

== Description ==
For terms see gastropod shell and Reproductive system of gastropods

The body of this semi-slug is too large to be contained in the very flat and depressed ear-shaped shell. The shell body whorl is ¾ of the total breadth viewed from above. It is very thin, fragile and transparent. Shell colour is greenish or yellowish. The shell aperture has a mouth membrane which runs from the umbilicus along the inside of the outer lip. The animal is pale to dark grey or black, paler forms have large dark grey areas. The mantle lobe is very large. The genitalia are diagnostic. The penis appendix joins the vagina below the insertion of the spermatheca duct.

== Distribution and habitat ==
This species is known to occur in Brittany, the French Pyrenees, Andorra, Spain and southwestern Ireland. This is called a Lusitanian distribution and was at one time thought to represent the survival of species in an ice-free land mass that served as a refugium during the last ice age. This theory has now been discredited as Ireland is thought to have been entirely covered by ice during the height of the Quaternary glaciation. It now seems likely that these species were re-introduced into Ireland after the last glaciation, probably accidentally with human migration in the late Paleolithic or early Mesolithic. It typically inhabits humid and shady places, between rocks, or in Ireland in woodland amongst moist ground litter, usually on non-calcareous soils. It is not usually found in areas grazed by livestock.

It has also recently been found at two sites in Wales, one in the south, and one in the north of the country.
