= Parmellops etheridgei =

Scientific classification
- Domain: Eukaryota
- Kingdom: Animalia
- Phylum: Mollusca
- Class: Gastropoda
- Order: Stylommatophora
- Family: Helicarionidae
- Subfamily: Helicarioninae
- Genus: Parmellops
- Species: P. etheridgei

Binomial name
- Parmellops etheridgei (Brazier, 1889)
- Location of Lord Howe Island

Synonyms
- Parmella etheridgei (Brazier, 1889); Vitrina (Parmella) etheridgei Brazier, 1889

Species of land snail

Parmellops etheridgei, also known as Etheridge's semislug, is a species of semislug that is endemic to Australia's Lord Howe Island in the Tasman Sea.

== Description ==
The shell of the mature animal is reduced, plate-like and only faintly visible, 0.1 mm in height, with a diameter of 13.6 mm, orange-gold in colouration. The animal is usually white to pale yellowish-brown with raised white pigmentation on the tail forming a triangle, and with black spots along the sides of the body.

== Distribution ==
The semislug is common in many localities in the northern part of the island, extending southwards to the upper slopes of Mount Lidgbird. It is arboreal, living mainly in palm trees, and is active at night and after rain.
