= P. atlantica =

P. atlantica may refer to:

- Pedicypraedia atlantica, a sea snail species
- Phenacolimax atlantica, an air-breathing land snail species endemic to Portugal
- Phoenix atlantica, the Cape Verde palm, a palm species in the genus Phoenix endemic to the Cape Verde Islands
- Phronima atlantica, a small translucent deep sea amphipod crustacean species
- Pistacia atlantica, the Mt. Atlas mastic tree, a tree species
- Polysiphonia atlantica a small red marine alga

== See also ==
- Atlantica
