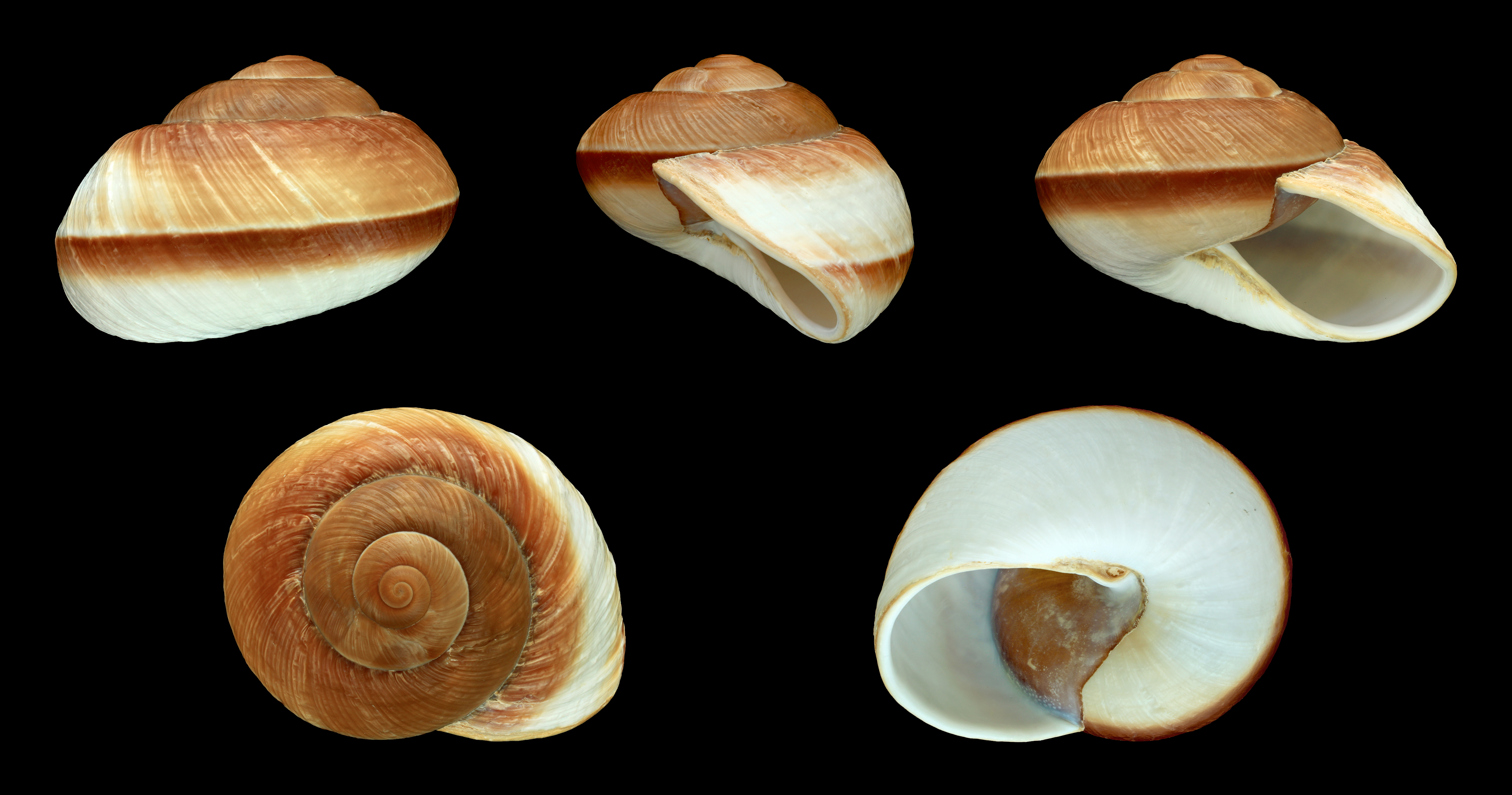
- Five views of a shell of Ryssota ovum

Scientific classification
- Domain: Eukaryota
- Kingdom: Animalia
- Phylum: Mollusca
- Class: Gastropoda
- Order: Stylommatophora
- Family: Chronidae
- Genus: Ryssota
- Species: R. ovum

Binomial name
- Ryssota ovum (Valenciennes, 1854)

Synonyms
- Ryssota otoheitana

= Ryssota ovum =

Ryssota otaheitana

Species of gastropod

Ryssota ovum, the polished muffin, is a species of large air-breathing land snail, a terrestrial pulmonate gastropod mollusk in the family Helicarionidae. It is endemic to the Philippines, where it is known locally as bayuku or bayoko. It is edible and is considered a delicacy.

== Distribution ==
Ryssota ovum is endemic to the Philippines, mainly in Luzon and in the island of Panay.

== Habitat ==
Ryssota ovum can normally be found underneath forest leaves and branches at the buttresses of tree. This species depends on moisture for survival. So it is abundant during the rainy season, while in the dry season it is present only in damp areas or in cool places.

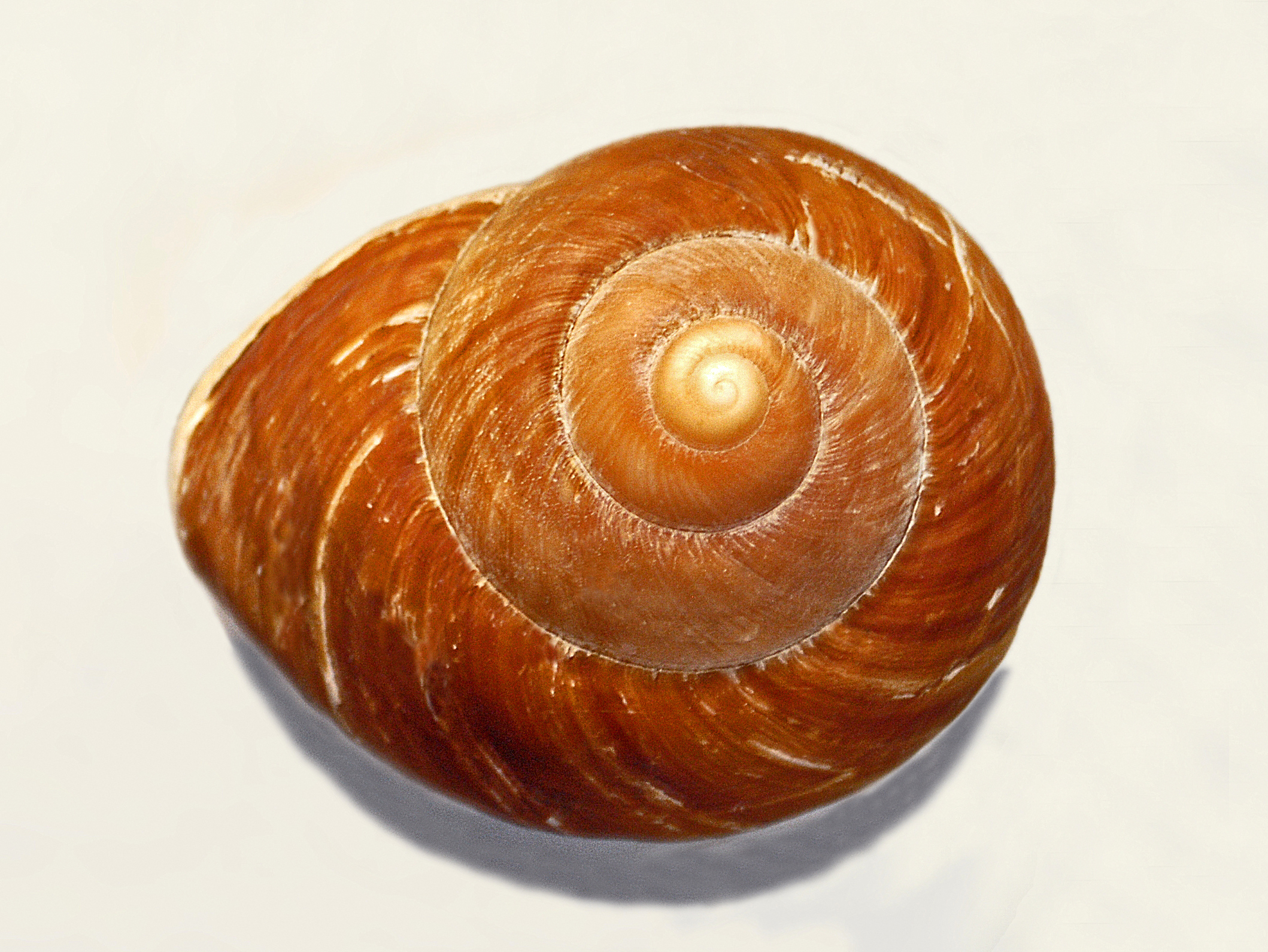
A shell of Ryssota ovum

== Description ==
This species is the largest land snail in the Philippines. Shells of Ryssota ovum can reach a diameter of 70–100 millimetres (2.8–3.9 in). These very large shells vary in color from pale brown to maroon and sometimes they show a brighter apex. The aperture is large and the interior may be white or bluish-white.

== Behavior ==
Ryssota ovum is nocturnal. As darkness approaches, these land snails start to move and feed on decomposing forest debris. At daybreak, they hide themselves among the forest litter. They are well-camouflaged in the soil at the base of trees among roots, fallen rotten branches, dead leaves or weathered rock surfaces.

== Human culture ==
The meat of these land snails (in Filipino called Bayuku) are considered a delicacy in Philippines. The empty shells are used as salt containers, ashtrays and drinking vessels.

== Bibliography ==
- Solatre, JS 2003. Characterization of the Habitat and Food Preference of Bayuku (Ryssota Ovum Val.) in Mt. Makiling Forest Reserve. UP Open University.
- Abbott, R. T. (1989): Compendium of Landshells. A color guide to more than 2,000 of the World's Terrestrial Shells. 240 S., American Malacologists. Melbourne, Fl, Burlington, Ma. ISBN 0-915826-23-2
- ERDB. Bayuku: A Delicacy and An Ally in a Forest Landscape - Llamas, J. 2003. Agroforestry - Institute of Agroforestry. Canopy International. Vol. 16 (6): p 3.
- Férussac, A. E. J. P. J. F. d'Audebard de [1821-1822]. Tableaux systématiques des animaux mollusques classés en familles naturelles, dans lesquels on a établi la concordance de tous les systèmes; suivis d'un prodrome général pour tous les mollusques terrestres ou fluviatiles, vivants ou fossiles
- Paul Bartsch: A Synopsis of the Philippine Land Mollusks of the Subgenus Ryssota. In: Proceedings of the Biological Society of Washington Vol. 51, S. 101–120, 193
- Quiñones, NC 1994. Some Facts and Updates on Edible Snails and Snail Farming. Tigerpaper. Vol. 21(1): p. 8-14..
- Springsteen, F.J. & Leobrera, F.M. 1986. Shells of the Philippines. Carfel Seashell Museum, Philippines: 1–377.
