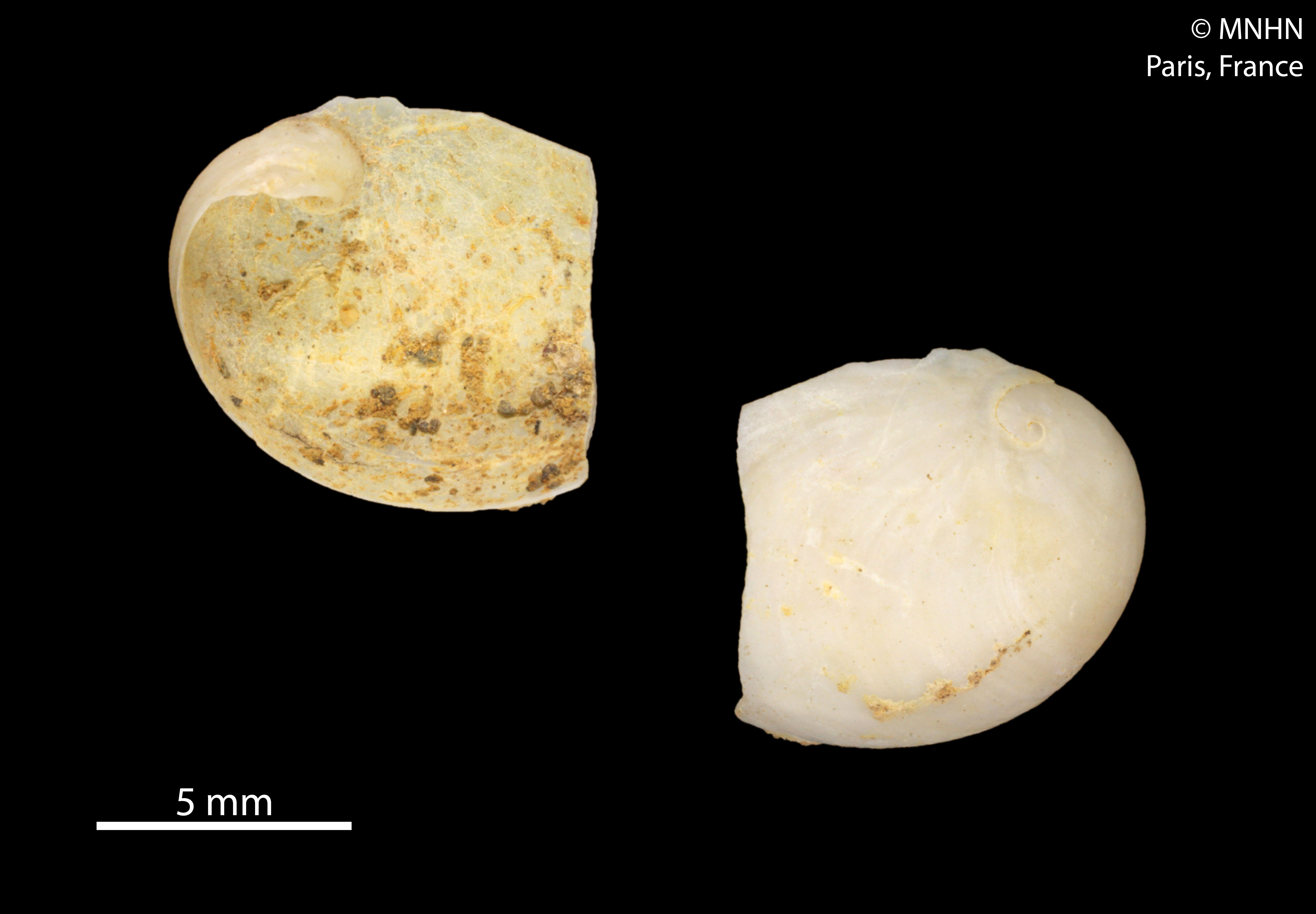
- Shell of † Madeirovitrina crassa (paratype at MNHN, Paris)

Scientific classification
- Domain: Eukaryota
- Kingdom: Animalia
- Phylum: Mollusca
- Class: Gastropoda
- Order: Stylommatophora
- Infraorder: Limacoidei
- Superfamily: Limacoidea
- Family: Vitrinidae
- Genus: Madeirovitrina; Groh & Hemmen, 1986

Synonyms
- Phenacolimax (Madeirovitrina) Groh & Hemmen, 1986; Plutonia (Madeirovitrina) Groh & Hemmen, 1986

= Madeirovitrina =

Genus of gastropods

Madeirovitrina is a genus of air-breathing land snails, terrestrial pulmonate gastropod mollusks in the family Vitrinidae.

== Species ==
- Madeirovitrina albopalliata (Groh & Hemmen, 1986)
- Madeirovitrina behnii (R. T. Lowe, 1852)
- † Madeirovitrina crassa (Groh & Hemmen, 1986)
- Madeirovitrina marcida (A. A. Gould, 1846)
- Madeirovitrina media (R. T. Lowe, 1855)
- Madeirovitrina nitida (A. Gould, 1846)
- † Madeirovitrina portosantana (Groh & Hemmen, 1986)
- Madeirovitrina ruivensis (A. A. Gould, 1846)
