= Oligolimax =

Scientific classification
- Kingdom: Animalia
- Phylum: Mollusca
- Class: Gastropoda
- Order: Stylommatophora
- Family: Vitrinidae
- Genus: Oligolimax; Fischer, 1878

Genus of land snails

Oligolimax is a genus of gastropods belonging to the family Vitrinidae.

The species of this genus are found in Europe and Western Asia.

Species:

- Oligolimax annularis (S.Studer, 1820)
- Oligolimax apatelus (Soós, 1924)
- Oligolimax cephalonica Rähle, 1980
- Oligolimax cerigottana E.Gittenberger, 1992
- Oligolimax lederi (O.Boettger, 1878)
- Oligolimax musignani (Pirajno, 1842)
- Oligolimax olympica (Hausdorf, 1995)
- Oligolimax paulucciae (P.Fischer, 1878)
