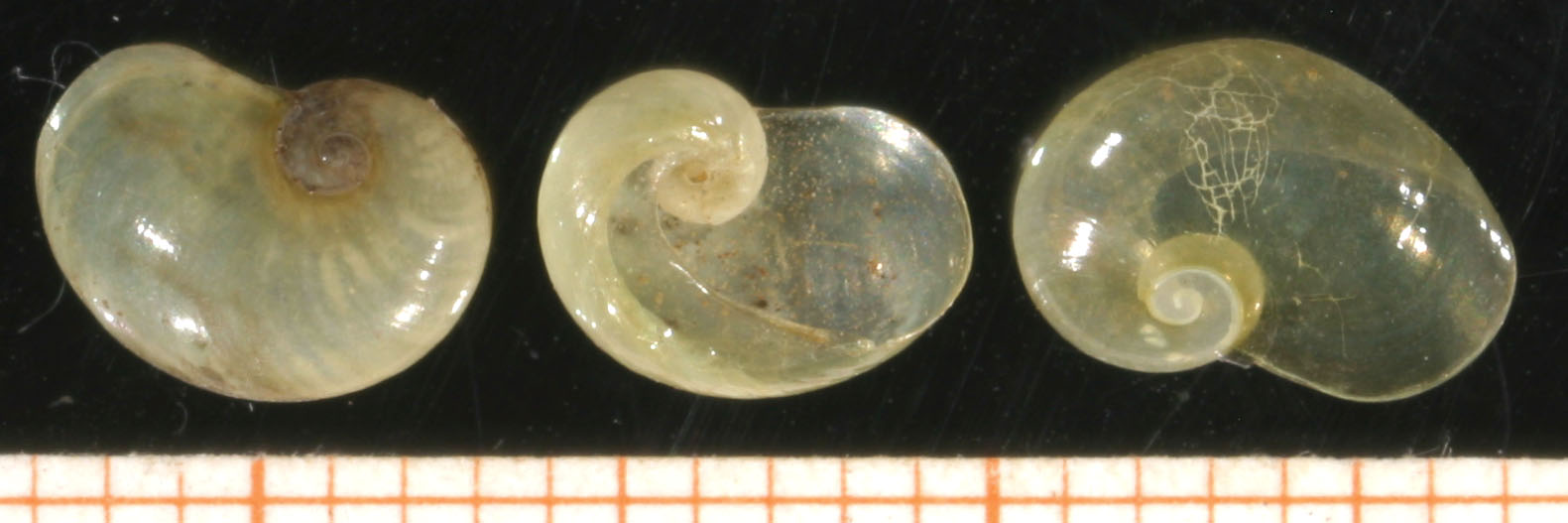
- Three shells of Eucobresia diaphana

Scientific classification
- Kingdom: Animalia
- Phylum: Mollusca
- Class: Gastropoda
- Order: Stylommatophora
- Family: Vitrinidae
- Subfamily: Vitrininae
- Genus: Eucobresia; Baker, 1929

= Eucobresia =

Genus of gastropods

Eucobresia is a genus of air-breathing land snails or semi-slugs, terrestrial pulmonate gastropod mollusks in the family Vitrinidae, the glass snails.

== Species ==
Species within the genus Eucobresia include:

- Eucobresia diaphana (Draparnaud, 1805)
- Eucobresia glacialis
- Eucobresia nivalis (Dumont & Mortillet, 1854)
- Eucobresia pegorarii
