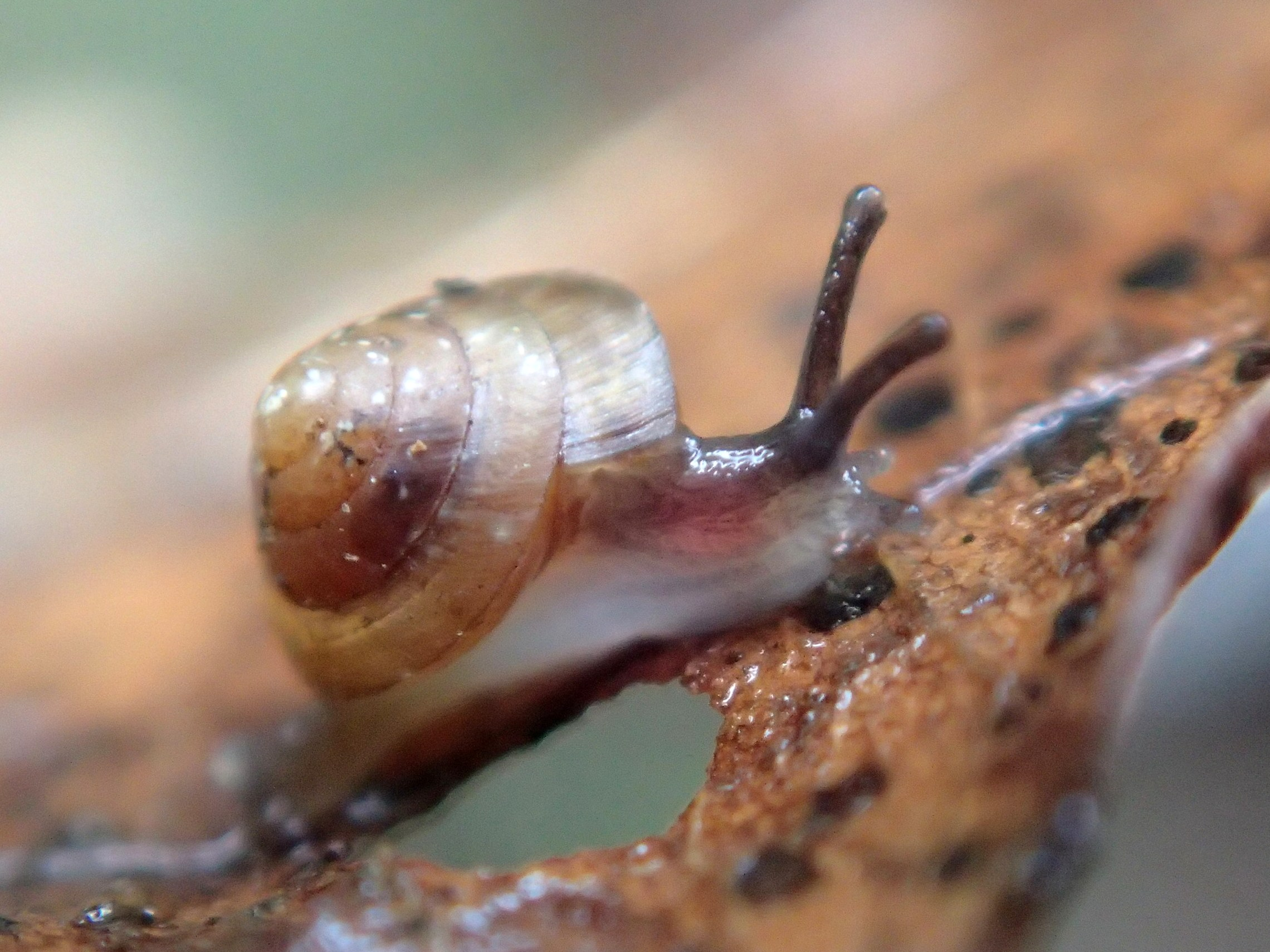
- Trochochlamys subcrenulata

Scientific classification
- Kingdom: Animalia
- Phylum: Mollusca
- Class: Gastropoda
- Order: Stylommatophora
- Infraorder: Limacoidei
- Superfamily: Trochomorphoidea
- Family: Chronidae
- Genus: Trochochlamys; Habe, 1946

= Trochochlamys =

Genus of gastropods

Trochochlamys is a genus of very small air-breathing land snails, terrestrial pulmonate gastropod molluscs in the family Chronidae.

== Species ==
Species within the genus Trochochlamys include:

- Trochochlamys acutangula (A. Adams, 1868)
- Trochochlamys borealis (Pilsbry, 1901)
- Trochochlamys crenulata (Gude, 1900)
- Trochochlamys fraterna (Pilsbry, 1900)
- Trochochlamys humiliconus (Pilsbry & Hirase, 1904)
- Trochochlamys kiiensis (Azuma, 1960)
- Trochochlamys labilis (Gould, 1859)
- Trochochlamys lioconus (Pilsbry & Hirase, 1905)
- Trochochlamys lioderma (Pilsbry, 1901)
- Trochochlamys longa (Pilsbry & Hirase, 1905)
- Trochochlamys longissima (Pilsbry & Hirase, 1909)
- Trochochlamys monticola Kuroda & Abe, 1980
- Trochochlamys nesiotica (Pilsbry & Hirase, 1903)
- Trochochlamys ogasawarana (Pilsbry, 1902)
- Trochochlamys okiensis (Pilsbry & Hirase, 1908)
- Trochochlamys okinoshimana (Pilsbry & Hirase, 1904)
- Trochochlamys settuensis Y. Azuma & M. Azuma, 1994
- Trochochlamys sororcula (Pilsbry & Y. Hirase, 1904)
- Trochochlamys subcrenulata (Pilsbry, 1901)
- Trochochlamys tanzawaensis Sorita & Kawana, 1983
- Trochochlamys xenica (Pilsbry & Hirase, 1903)

Species brought into synonymy

- Trochochlamys praealta (Pilsbry, 1902): synonym of Coneuplecta praealta (Pilsbry, 1902) (unaccepted combination)
