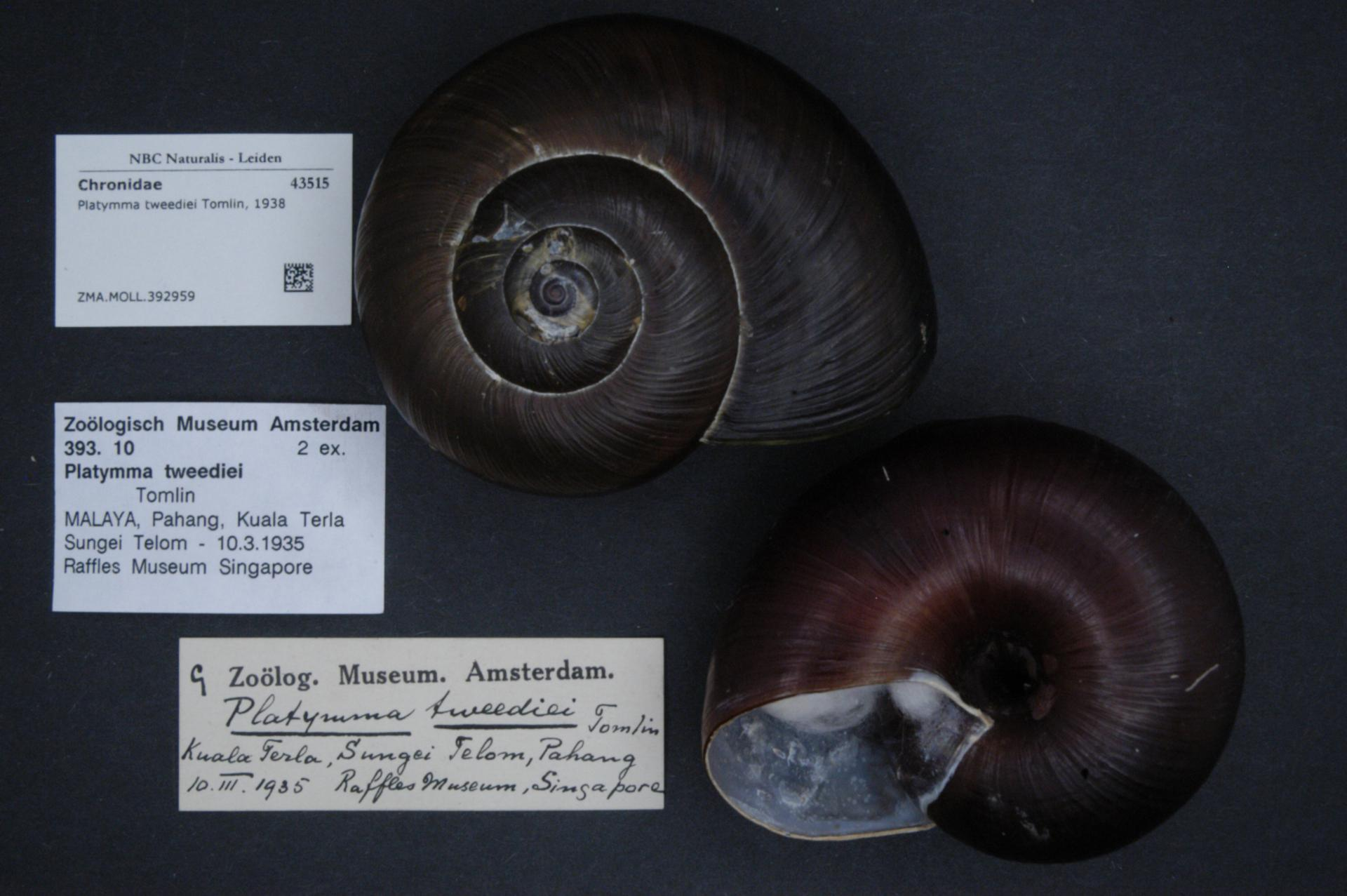
- The shell of Platymma tweediei on display in the Naturalis Biodiversity Center

Scientific classification
- Kingdom: Animalia
- Phylum: Mollusca
- Class: Gastropoda
- Order: Stylommatophora
- Family: Chronidae
- Genus: Platymma; Tomlin, 1938
- Species: P. tweediei

Binomial name
- Platymma tweediei Tomlin, 1938

Synonyms
- Hemiplecta tweediei (Davison, 1995)

= Platymma =

Genus of snails

Platymma tweediei, often called the (Malaysian) fire snail, is the largest land snail in Peninsular Malaysia, living exclusively in the mountainous forests there. It is the only species in the genus Platymma. It is characterized by its black shell and orange to bright red foot.

Although not officially endangered, the species is threatened by a combination of habitat loss and poachers; the vivid colours makes this species attractive to keep as a pet. However, the care for this animal is incredibly difficult, due to this species' very specific environmental needs.

== Distribution ==
P. tweediei has been identified living in tropical Montane forest areas with altitudes in excess of 1,000 meters. Originally, P. tweediei was found in the Cameron Highlands area of Pahang, but has since been found near the Temengor Forest Reserve and the Pergau River in Kelantan. To date, it cannot be ascertained whether they exist in isolation or their habitat covers the mountainous areas of the northern Peninsula in general.
