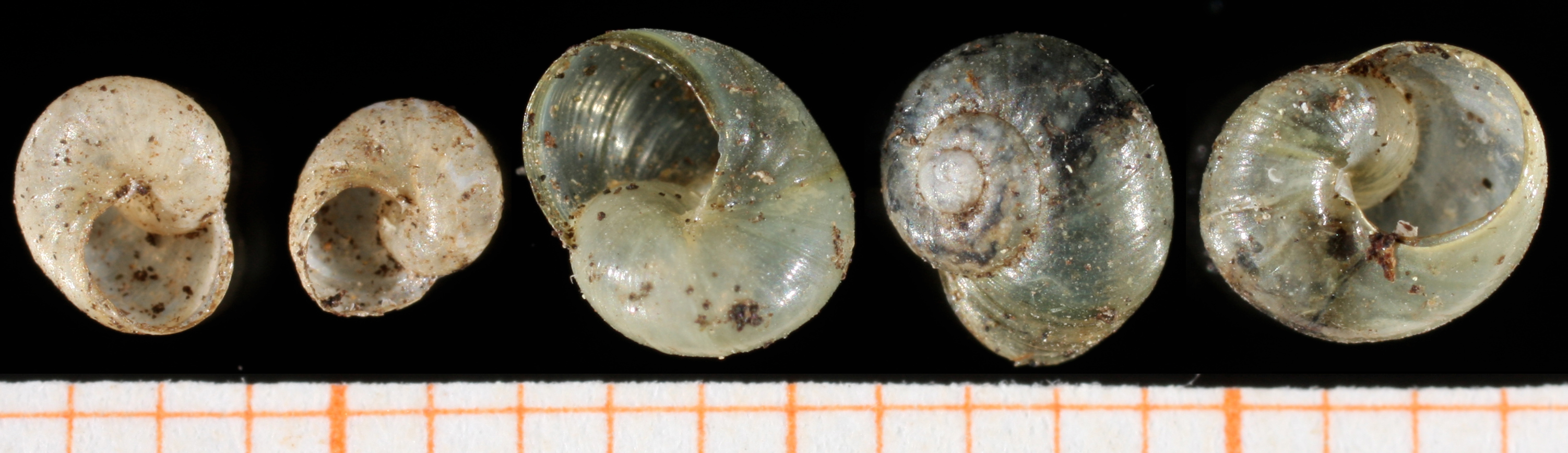

Scientific classification
- Kingdom: Animalia
- Phylum: Mollusca
- Class: Gastropoda
- Order: Stylommatophora
- Family: Vitrinidae
- Genus: Oligolimax
- Species: O. annularis

Binomial name
- Oligolimax annularis (Studer, 1820)

= Oligolimax annularis =

Species of gastropod

Oligolimax annularis is a species of gastropods belonging to the family Vitrinidae.

The species is found in Southern Europe and Western Asia.
