= Howearion =

Scientific classification
- Kingdom: Animalia
- Phylum: Mollusca
- Class: Gastropoda
- Order: Stylommatophora
- Infraorder: Limacoidei
- Superfamily: Helicarionoidea
- Family: Helicarionidae
- Genus: Howearion; Iredale, 1944

Genus of semislugs from Australia

Howearion is a genus of two species of helicarionid semislugs that are endemic to Australia’s Lord Howe Island in the Tasman Sea.

== Species ==
- Howearion belli Iredale, 1944 – beautiful semislug
- Howearion hilli (Cox, 1873) – Lord Howe semislug
