= Parmellops =

Scientific classification
- Kingdom: Animalia
- Phylum: Mollusca
- Class: Gastropoda
- Order: Stylommatophora
- Superfamily: Helicarionoidea
- Family: Helicarionidae
- Subfamily: Helicarioninae
- Genus: Parmellops; Iredale, 1944
- Location of Lord Howe Island

Genus of semislugs from Australia

Parmellops is a genus of two species of semislugs that are endemic to Australia's Lord Howe Island in the Tasman Sea.

== Species ==
- Parmellops etheridgei (Brazier, 1889) – Etheridge's semislug
- Parmellops perspicuus Hyman & Ponder, 2016 – transparent semislug
