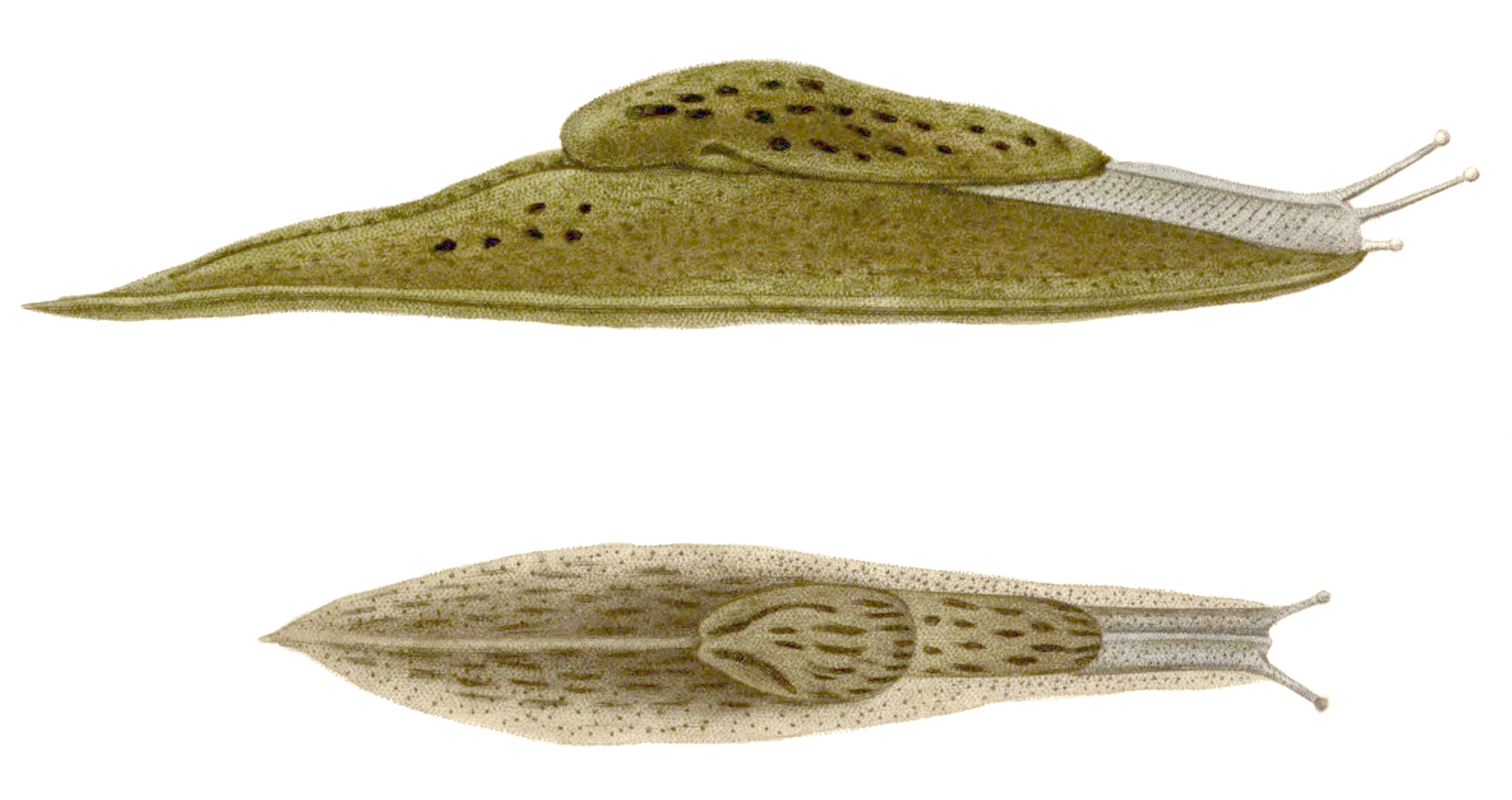

Conservation status
- Near Threatened (IUCN 3.1)

Scientific classification
- Kingdom: Animalia
- Phylum: Mollusca
- Class: Gastropoda
- Order: Stylommatophora
- Family: Parmacellidae
- Genus: Cryptella
- Species: C. canariensis

Binomial name
- Cryptella canariensis Webb & Berthelot, 1833

Synonyms
- Parmacella canariensis (Webb & Berthelot, 1833)

= Cryptella canariensis =

Species of gastropod

Cryptella canariensis is a species of terrestrial semislug with a small shell in the family Parmacellidae. This species is also known as Parmacella canariensis.

== Distribution ==
This species is endemic to the Canary Islands.

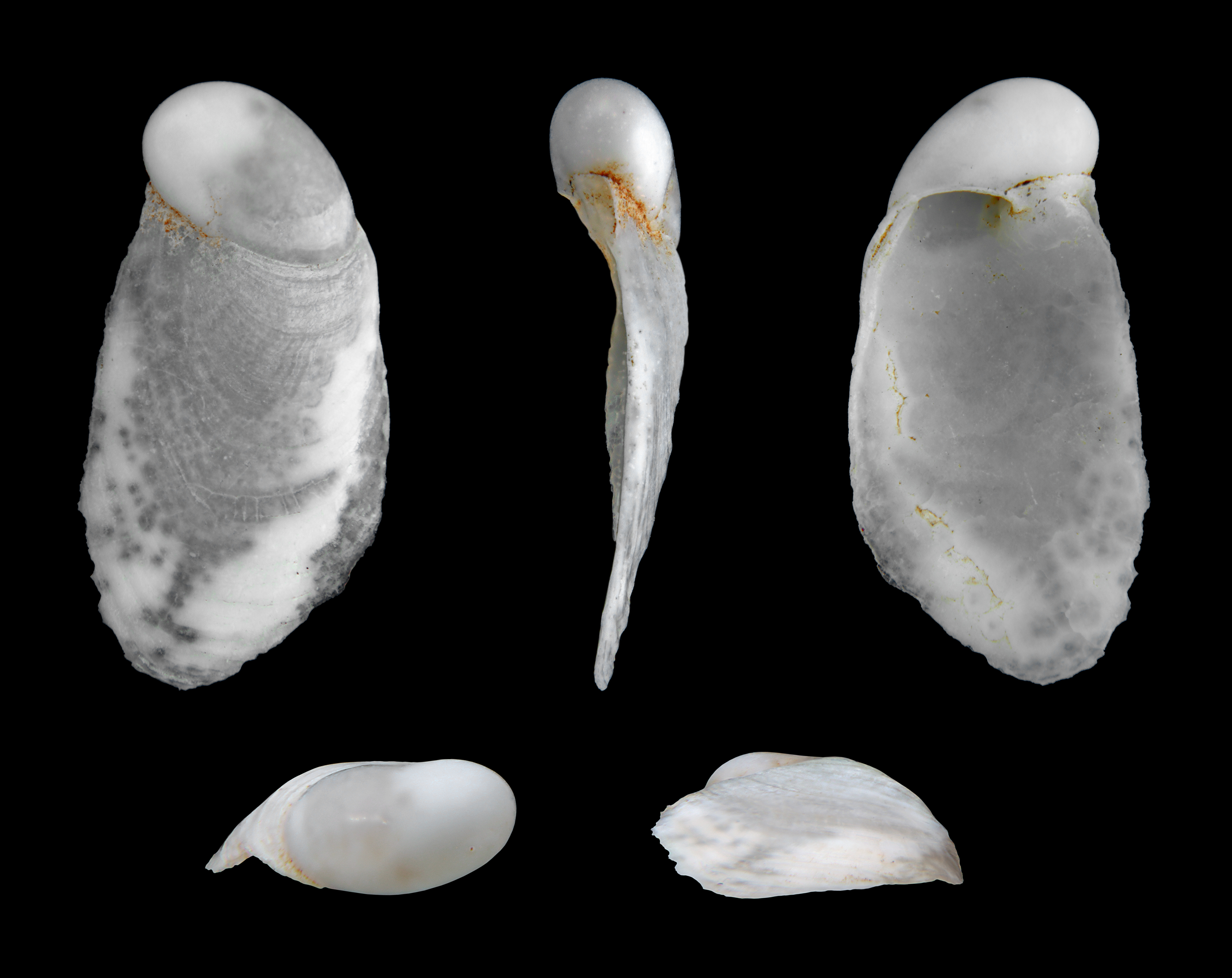
Shell of Cryptella canariensis.

== Description ==
The animal is greyish to yellowish brown, with black spots or streaks on the mantle and on the sides, mantle length 55% of body. The animal grows up to 40 mm long.

The shell has a smooth, thick and brown-yellow apex.
