= Phenacolimax =

Scientific classification
- Domain: Eukaryota
- Kingdom: Animalia
- Phylum: Mollusca
- Class: Gastropoda
- Order: Stylommatophora
- Infraorder: Limacoidei
- Superfamily: Limacoidea
- Family: Vitrinidae
- Genus: Phenacolimax; Stabile, 1859

Type species
- Helicolimax major A. Férussac, 1807

Synonyms
- Phenacolimax (Phenacolimax) Stabile, 1859

Genus of gastropods

Phenacolimax is a genus of air-breathing land snails, terrestrial pulmonate gastropod mollusks in the family Vitrinidae.

== Species ==
The genus Phenacolimax includes the following species:

- Phenacolimax blanci (Pollonera, 1884)
- † Phenacolimax crassitesta (Andreae, 1902)
- † Phenacolimax intermedius (Reuss in Reuss & Meyer, 1849)
- † Phenacolimax kochi (Andreae, 1884)
- Phenacolimax locardi (Pollonera, 1884)
- Phenacolimax major (A. Férussac, 1807)
- Phenacolimax stabilei (Lessona, 1880)
- † Phenacolimax suevica (F. Sandberger, 1872)

Synonyms

- Phenacolimax annularis (S. Studer, 1820): synonym of Oligolimax annularis (S. Studer, 1820à)(unaccepted combination)
- Phenacolimax austrasiae A. J. Wagner, 1915: synonym of Phenacolimax major (A. Férussac, 1807) (junior synonym)
- Phenacolimax retyezati A. J. Wagner, 1915: synonym of Semilimacella bonellii reitteri (O. Boettger, 1880) (junior synonym)
