= Semilimacella =

Scientific classification
- Domain: Eukaryota
- Kingdom: Animalia
- Phylum: Mollusca
- Class: Gastropoda
- Order: Stylommatophora
- Family: Vitrinidae
- Genus: Semilimacella; Soós, 1917

Genus of land snails

Semilimacella is a genus of gastropods belonging to the family Vitrinidae.

The species of this genus are found in the Balkans.

Species:

- Semilimacella bonellii (Targioni Tozzetti, 1873)
- Semilimacella carniolica (Boettger, 1884)
- Semilimacella cephalonica (Rähle, 1980)
