= Attenborougharion rubicundus =

Conservation status
- Vulnerable (IUCN 2.3)

Scientific classification
- Kingdom: Animalia
- Phylum: Mollusca
- Class: Gastropoda
- Order: Stylommatophora
- Family: Helicarionidae
- Subfamily: Helicarioninae
- Genus: Attenborougharion; Hyman & Köhler, 2017
- Species: A. rubicundus

Binomial name
- Attenborougharion rubicundus (Dartnall & Kershaw, 1978)

Synonyms
- Helicarion rubicundus Dartnall & Kershaw, 1978

Species of gastropod

Attenborougharion rubicundus is a species of air-breathing semi-slug, terrestrial pulmonate gastropod molluscs in the family Helicarionidae.

It has been referred to as the "burgundy snail", but should not be confused with Helix pomatia, which is also known by that name.

== Taxonomy ==
This species was described under the name Helicarion rubicundus in 1978. The species was reassigned from genus Helicarion to Attenborougharion its own monotypic genus, named after David Attenborough, in 2017 by researchers at the Australian Museum. The description of this genus was formally published on 9 August 2017.

== Distribution ==
This species is endemic to Australia, and is known only from the Forestier Peninsula and a small portion of the Tasman Peninsula on the island of Tasmania.

== Description ==
These semi-slugs are about 27.5–45 mm in length and are bright green and bright red. The species has a flattened body and their reproductive system has an irregular shape compared to the usual V-shaped rows.

== See also ==
- List of things named after David Attenborough and his works
