= Vitrinobrachium =

Scientific classification
- Domain: Eukaryota
- Kingdom: Animalia
- Phylum: Mollusca
- Class: Gastropoda
- Order: Stylommatophora
- Family: Vitrinidae
- Subfamily: Vitrininae
- Genus: Vitrinobrachium; Künkel, 1929

Genus of gastropods

Vitrinobrachium is a genus of gastropods belonging to the family Vitrinidae.

The species of this genus are found in Central Europe.

Species:

- Vitrinobrachium baccettii Giusti & Mazzini, 1971
- Vitrinobrachium breve (A.Férussac, 1821)
- Vitrinobrachium tridentinum Forcart, 1956
