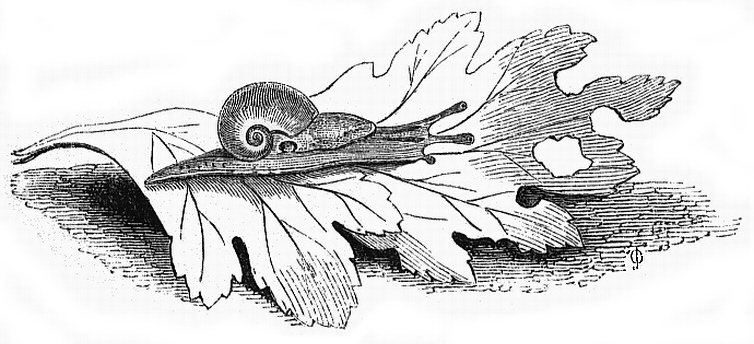
- An engraving of Vitrina pellucida by Orlando Jewitt from his 1863 book The land and freshwater mollusks indigenous to, or naturalized in, the British Isles

Scientific classification
- Kingdom: Animalia
- Phylum: Mollusca
- Class: Gastropoda
- Order: Stylommatophora
- Superfamily: Limacoidea
- Family: Vitrinidae
- Subfamily: Vitrininae
- Genus: Vitrina; Draparnaud, 1801

Type species
- Cythara metria Dall, 1903

Synonyms
- Cobresia Hübner, 1810; Glischrus (Hyalina) S. Studer, 1820 (non Schumacher, 1817); Helicolimax J. B. Férussac, 1807; Helix (Hyalina) S. Studer, 1820 (junior objective synonym); Hyalina S. Studer, 1820 junior homonym (non Schumacher, 1817); Pagana Gistel, 1848; Vitrina (Vitrina) Draparnaud, 1801; Zonites (Hyalina) Studer, 1820

= Vitrina =

Genus of molluscs

Vitrina is genus of small air-breathing land snails, terrestrial pulmonate gastropod mollusks in the family Vitrinidae, the glass snails.

== Description ==
The shell is globular. There is no apertural membrane. The mantle lobe is very small. There is no penial appendix, no vagina, which means that penis, oviduct and spermatheca duct join at a common point.

These are closely allied species, in which the internal organization is in many cases more distinctive than the external aspect of the shell.

== Distribution ==
These species occur in North America, Greenland, Europe and northern Asia.

== Species ==
Species with the genus Vitrina include:

- Vitrina angelicae Beck, 1837
- Vitrina baudoni Delaunay, 1877
- Vitrina exilis Morelet, 1858
- † Vitrina kubanica Volkova, 1953
- † Vitrina ludovici Depéret, 1895
- † Vitrina obesa H.-Z. Pan, 1977
- † Vitrina obliqua H.-Z. Pan, 1977 (accepted > unreplaced junior homonym)
- Vitrina pellucida (Müller, 1774)
- † Vitrina puncticulata F. Sandberger, 1872
- Vitrina rugulosa E. von Martens, 1874
- † Vitrina splendida C. Koch, 1880
- Vitrina tenella A. Gould, 1852
- † Vitrina turonica Collot, 1911

Synonyms

- † Vitrina suevica Sandberger, 1872: synonym of † Phenacolimax suevica (F. Sandberger, 1872) (superseded combination)

Taxa inquirenda

- Vitrina amoena Morelet, 1884
- Vitrina angolensis Morelet, 1867
- Vitrina bozasi de Rochebrune & Germain, 1904
- Vitrina compacta Preston, 1912
- Vitrina josephinae Emberton & Griffiths, 2009 (generic affinity uncertain)
- Vitrina madagascariensis E. A. Smith, 1882
- Vitrina marojeziana Fischer-Piette, Blanc, C.P., Blanc, F. & Salvat, 1994
- Vitrina ugandensis Thiele, 1911
