= Plutonia (gastropod) =

Scientific classification
- Domain: Eukaryota
- Kingdom: Animalia
- Phylum: Mollusca
- Class: Gastropoda
- Order: Stylommatophora
- Infraorder: Limacoidei
- Superfamily: Limacoidea
- Family: Vitrinidae
- Genus: Plutonia; Morelet, 1864

Synonyms
- Vitriplutonia Collinge, 1893

Genus of gastropods

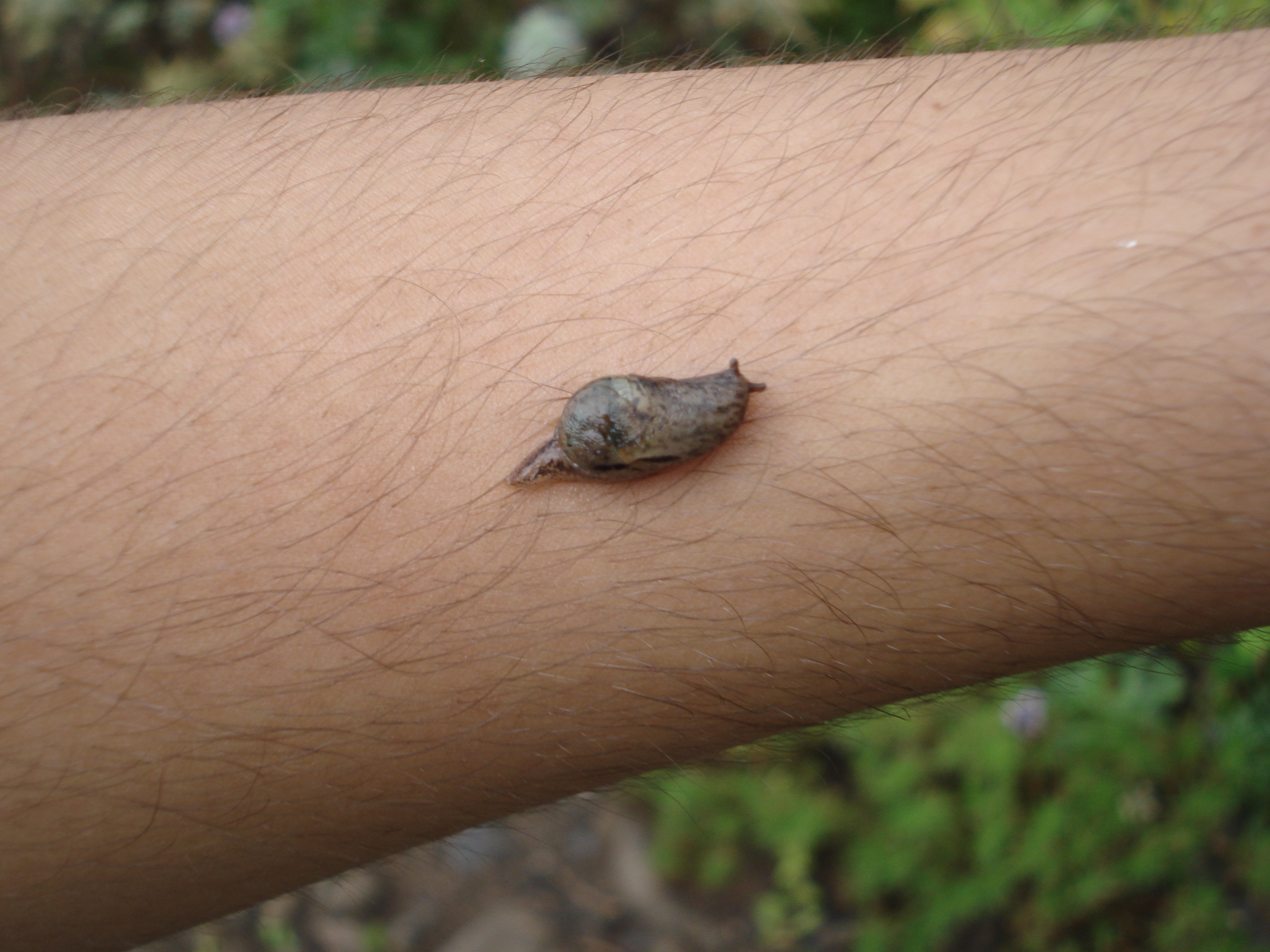
A plutonia snail.

Plutonia is a genus of air-breathing land snails, terrestrial pulmonate gastropod molluscs in the family Vitrinidae.

== Distribution ==
This species occurs on the Azores.

== Species ==
- Plutonia atlantica (Morelet, 1860)

Synonyms

- Plutonia crassa (Groh & Hemmen, 1986) †: synonym of Madeirovitrina crassa (Groh & Hemmen, 1986) †
- Plutonia dianae Valido & M. R. Alonso, 2000: synonym of Canarivitrina dianae (Valido & M. R. Alonso, 2000) (original combination)
- Plutonia falcifera Ibanez & Groh, 2000: synonym of Canarivitrina falcifera (Ibáñez & Groh, 2000) (original combination)
- Plutonia portosantana (Groh & Hemmen, 1986) †: synonym of Madeirovitrina portosantana (Groh & Hemmen, 1986) †
- Plutonia ripkeni M. R. Alonso & Ibanez, 2000: synonym of Canarivitrina ripkeni (M. R. Alonso & Ibáñez, 2000) (original combination)
- Plutonia ruivensis (A. A. Gould, 1846): synonym of Madeirovitrina ruivensis (A. A. Gould, 1846)
- Plutonia solemi Ibáñez & M. R. Alonso, 2001: synonym of Insulivitrina solemi (Ibáñez & M. R. Alonso, 2001) (original combination)
- Plutonia taburientensis Groh & Valido, 2000: synonym of Canarivitrina taburientensis (Groh & Valido, 2000) (original combination)
