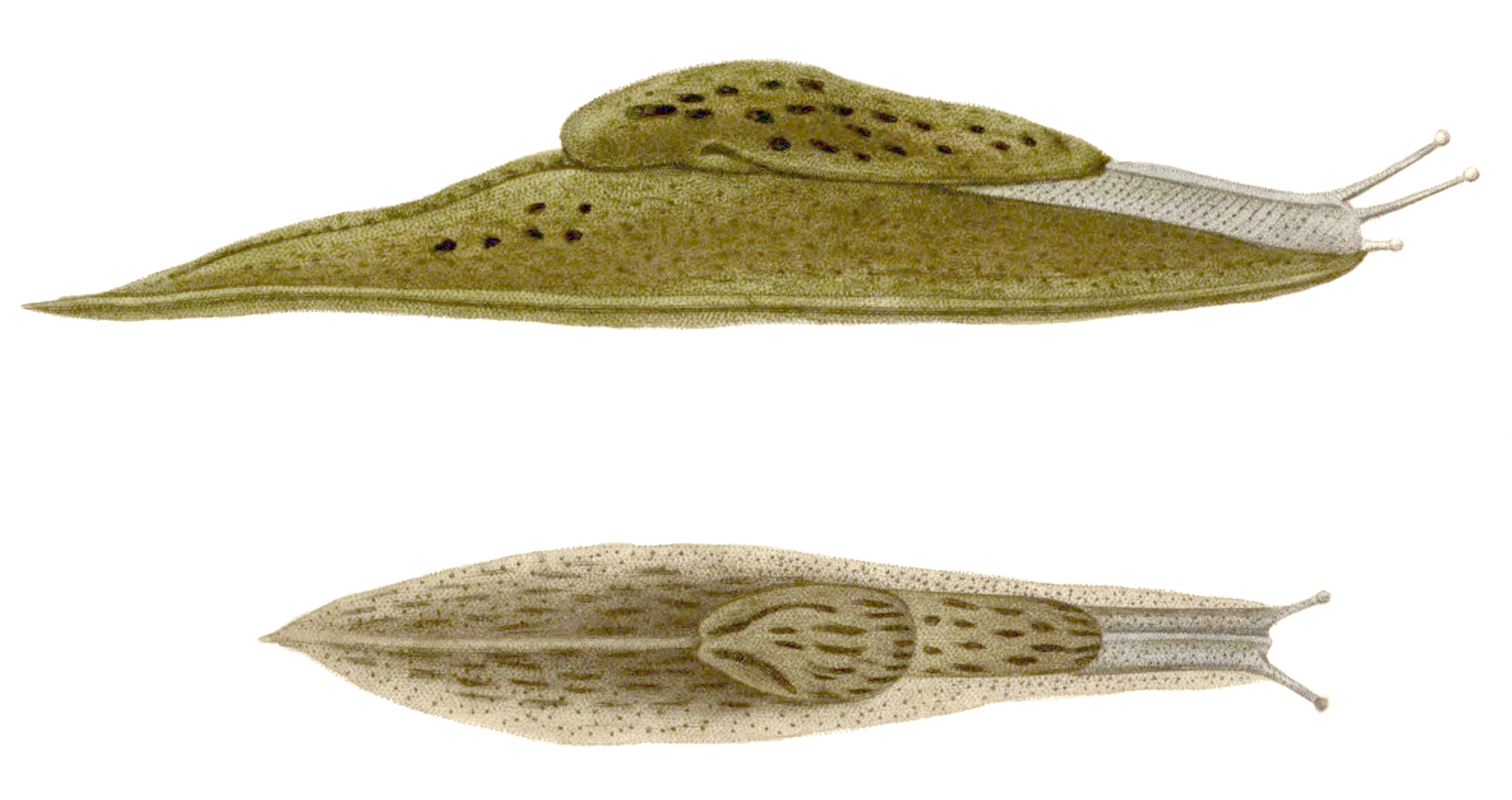
- Cryptella canariensis

Scientific classification
- Kingdom: Animalia
- Phylum: Mollusca
- Class: Gastropoda
- Order: Stylommatophora
- Family: Parmacellidae
- Genus: Cryptella; Webb & Berthelot, 1833

= Cryptella =

Genus of gastropods

Cryptella is a genus of small-shelled slugs in the family Parmacellidae. They are endemic to the Canary Islands.

== Species ==
There are seven species in the genus Cryptella:

- Cryptella alegranzae Hutterer & Groh, 1991
- Cryptella auriculata (Mousson, 1872)
- Cryptella canariensis P. B. Webb & S. Berthelot, 1833
- Cryptella famarae Hutterer & Groh, 1991
- †Cryptella parvula (Hutterer, 1990)
- Cryptella susannae (Hutterer, 1990)
- Cryptella tamaranensis (Hutterer, 1990)
