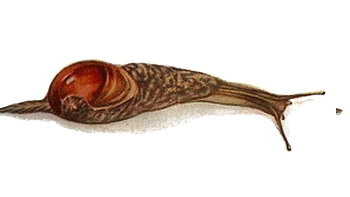
- Drawing of Semilimax pyrenaicus

Scientific classification
- Kingdom: Animalia
- Phylum: Mollusca
- Class: Gastropoda
- Order: Stylommatophora
- Family: Vitrinidae
- Genus: Semilimax; Gray, 1847

= Semilimax =

Genus of gastropods

Semilimax is a genus of air-breathing land snails, terrestrial pulmonate gastropod mollusks in the family Vitrinidae.

== Species ==
The genus Semilimax includes the following species:

- Semilimax carinthiacus (Westerlund, 1886)
- Semilimax kotulae (Westerlund, 1883)
- Semilimax pyrenaicus (A. Férussac, 1821)
- Semilimax semilimax (A. Férussac, 1802)
