= Trukrhysa =

Trukrhysa pachystoma

Conservation status
- Data Deficient (IUCN 2.3)

Scientific classification
- Kingdom: Animalia
- Phylum: Mollusca
- Class: Gastropoda
- Order: Stylommatophora
- Superfamily: Trochomorphoidea
- Family: Chronidae
- Genus: Trukrhysa; H. B. Baker, 1941
- Species: T. pachystoma

Binomial name
- Trukrhysa pachystoma (Hombron & Jacquinot, 1841)

Synonyms
- List (Genus): Ryssota (Trukrhysa) H. B. Baker, 1941; (Species): Helix hogoleuensis Le Guillou, 1845; Helix pachystoma Hombron & Jacquinot, 1841; Helix sowerbyana L. Pfeiffer, 1841; Hemiplecta sowerbyana (L. Pfeiffer, 1841); Ryssota (Trukrhysa) pachystoma (Hombron & Jacquinot, 1841)

Genus of molluscs

Trukrhysa is a genus of air-breathing land snails, terrestrial pulmonate gastropod mollusks in the family Chronidae. It is monotypic, being represented by the single species Trukrhysa pachystoma which is endemic to the Caroline Islands, Micronesia.
