= Semi-slug =

Land gastropod

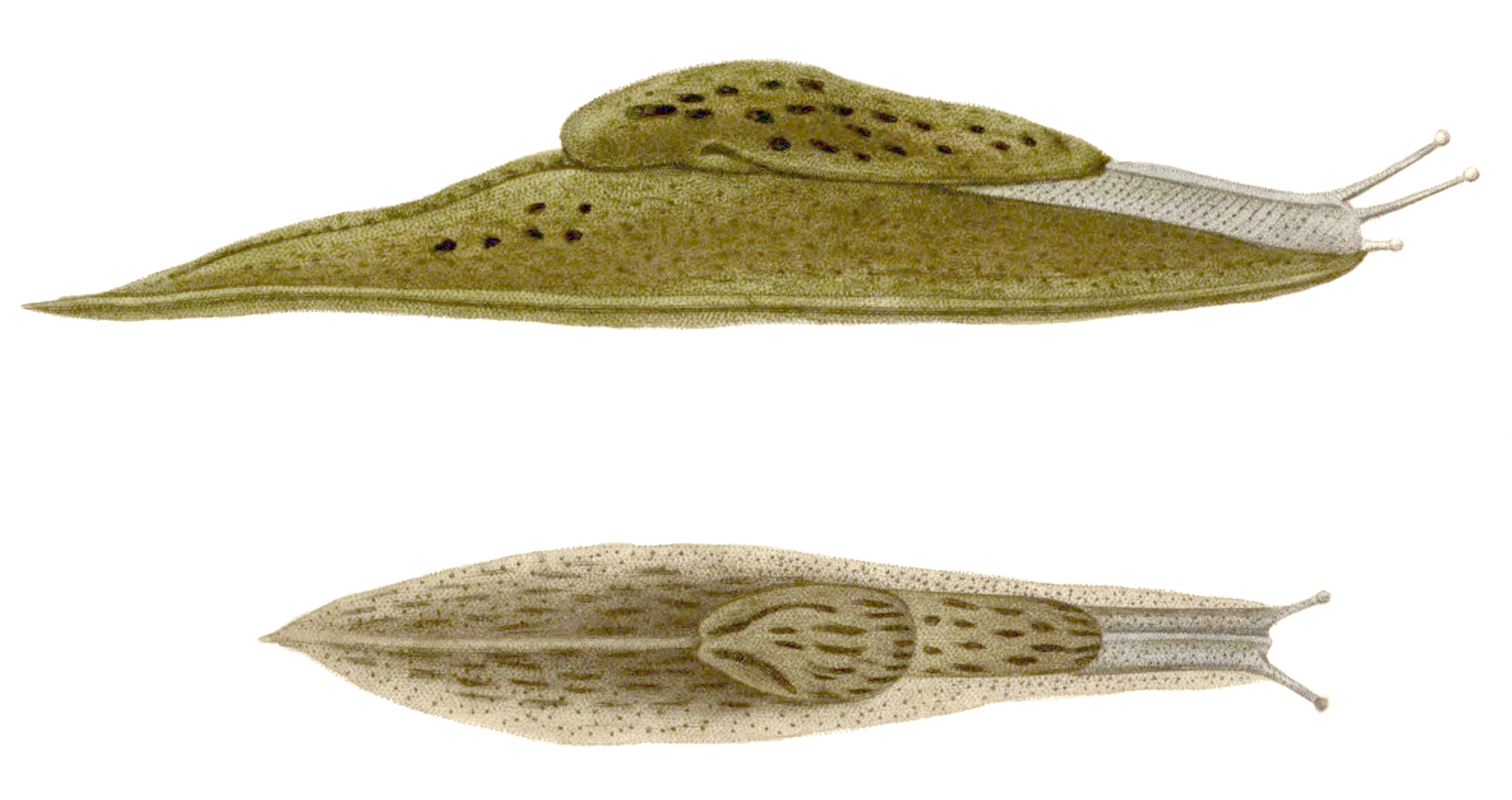
Side and top view of a Cryptella canariensis from the Canary Islands

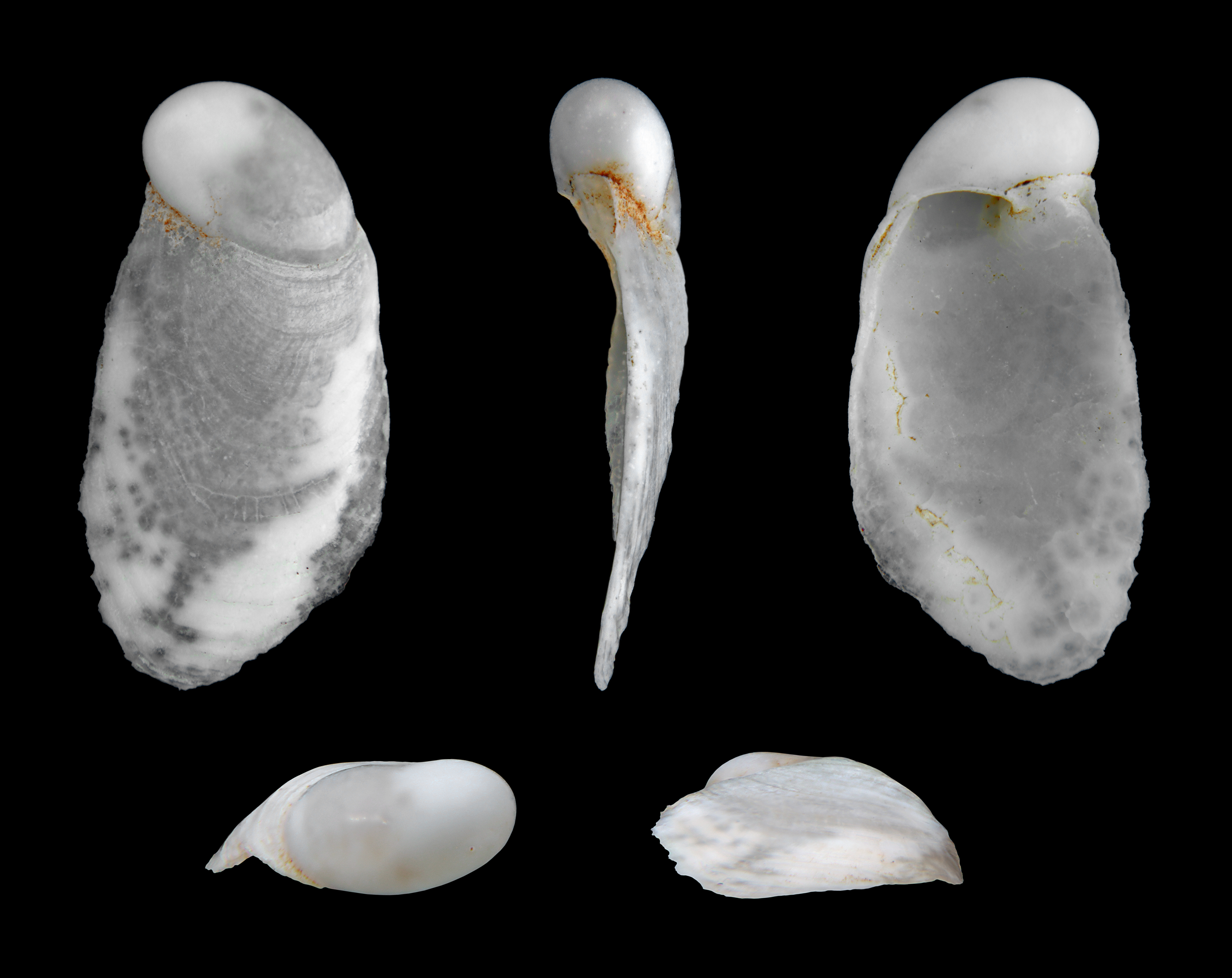
Shell of Cryptella canariensis

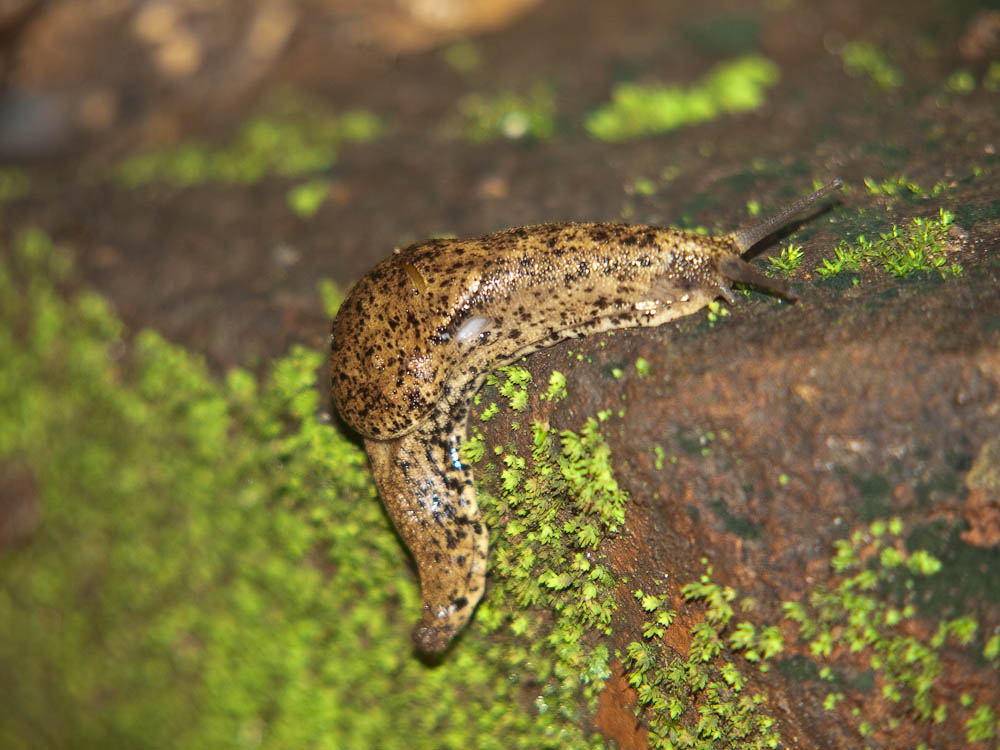
An unidentified semi-slug from Uganda

Semi-slugs, also spelled semislugs, are land gastropods whose shells are too small for them to retract into, but not quite vestigial. The shell of some semi-slugs may not be easily visible on casual inspection, because the shell may be covered over with the mantle.

This is a type of gastropod that is intermediate between a slug (without an external shell) and a land snail (with a large enough shell to retract completely into).

There exist a number of gastropod families that have semi-slug species. There exist about 1,000 species of semi-slugs in comparison to about only 500 species of slugs.

== Examples ==
Semi-slugs have a worldwide distribution and have evolved in several families; genera include:

- Palearctic and Nearctic
  - family Parmacellidae: Cryptella
  - family Vitrinidae: Eucobresia, Semilimax, Vitrina, Vitrinobrachium
- Asia - Pacific
  - family Ariophantidae: Parmarion, Ratnadvipia, Varadia
  - family Helicarionidae: Attenborougharion, Helicarion, Howearion, Ibycus, Parmellops, Ubiquitarion
  - Semi-slugs also exist but are exceptional in the Camaenidae.
- Neotropics
  - family Amphibulimidae: Amphibulima, Gaeotis
  - family Xanthonychidae: Cryptostrakon, Semiconchula, Xanthonyx
  - family Pleurodontidae: Coloniconcha prima
- Tropical Africa
  - family Urocyclidae: Gymnarion

== See also ==
- "Leatherleaf slugs" - Veronicellidae
