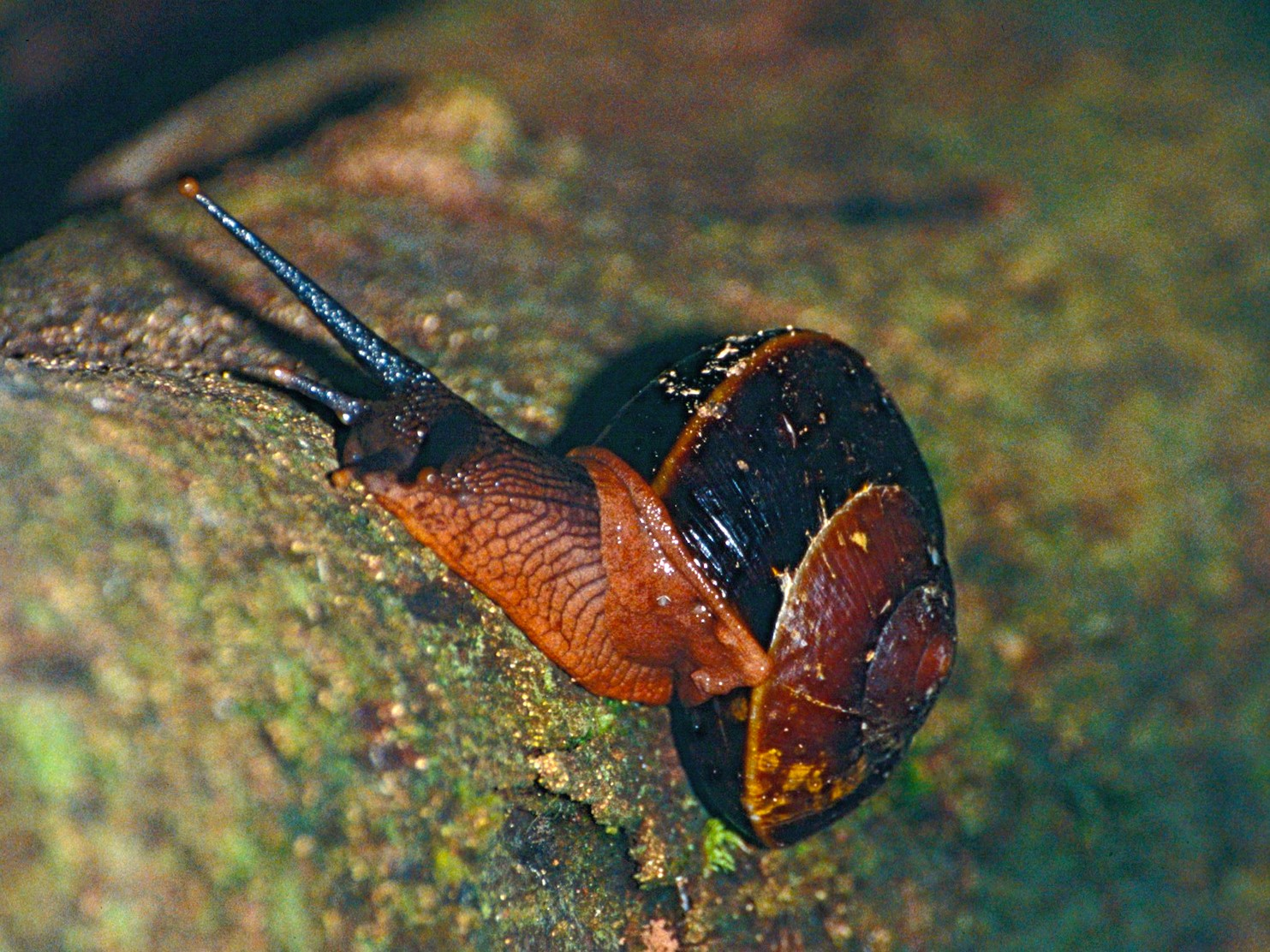
- Exrhysota brookei

Scientific classification
- Kingdom: Animalia
- Phylum: Mollusca
- Class: Gastropoda
- Order: Stylommatophora
- Suborder: Helicina
- Infraorder: Limacoidei
- Superfamily: Trochomorphoidea
- Family: Chronidae; Thiele, 1931

Genera
- See text

Synonyms
- Ryssotidae Schileyko, 2003

= Chronidae =

Family of gastropods

Chronidae is a family of air-breathing land slugs, terrestrial pulmonate gastropod molluscs in the superfamily Trochomorphoidea within the superorder Eupulmonata.

== Distribution ==
Distribution of Chronidae include eastern-Palearctic, Ethiopian, Madagascar, India, south-eastern Asia, Australian and Polynesian eco-regions.

== Genera ==
Genera within the family Chronidae include:

- Antinous Robson, 1914
- Atrichoconcha Bartsch, 1942
- Bekkochlamys Habe, 1958
- Ceratochlamys Habe, 1946
- Chronos Robson, 1914 - type * of the family Chronidae
- Danjochlamys Y. Azuma & M. Azuma, 1993
- Exrhysota H. B. Baker, 1941
- Gastrodontella Möllendorff, 1901
- Glyptobensonia Möllendorff, 1894
- Hemiglypta Möllendorff, 1893
- Hemiglyptopsis Thiele, 1931
- Hemitrichiella Zilch, 1956
- Japanochlamys Habe, 1946
- Kaliella W. T. Blanford, 1863
- Lamarckiella Möllendorff, 1898
- Lepidotrichia Bartsch, 1942
- Macroceras C. Semper, 1870
- Nesokaliella Gerlach, 1998 - endemic to the Seychelles
- Nipponochlamys Habe, 1945
- Otesiopsis Habe, 1946
- Parakaliella Habe, 1946
- Pararyssota Bartsch, 1938
- Platymma Tomlin, 1938
- Ponapea H. B. Baker, 1941
- Pseudhelicarion Möllendorff, 1894
- Pseudokaliella Godwin-Austen, 1910
- Ryssota Albers, 1850
- Striokaliella Thiele, 1931
- Takemasaia Azuma & Minato, 1976
- Trichobensonia Möllendorff, 1902
- Trochochlamys Habe, 1946
- Trukrhysa H. B. Baker, 1941
- Vitrinoidea C. Semper, 1873
- Vitrinopsis C. Semper, 1873
- Yamatochlamys Habe, 1945

Synonyms

- Hemitrichia Möllendorff, 1888: synonym of Hemitrichiella Zilch, 1956 (Invalid: Junior homonym of Hemitrichia Rostafinski, 1873 [Myxomycetes]; Hemitrichiella is a replacement name)
- Rhysota Martens, 1860: synonym of Ryssota Albers, 1850 (unjustified emendation of the original name)
- Rhyssota auct.: synonym of Ryssota Albers, 1850 (invalid: unjustified emendation of the original name)

== Cladogram ==
The following cladogram shows the phylogenic relationships of this family with the other families within the limacoid clade:

- limacoid clade
  - Staffordioidea
    Staffordiidae
  - - - Dyakioidea
        Dyakiidae
      - Gastrodontoidea
        - Pristilomatidae
        - - Chronidae
          - - Euconulidae
            - Trochomorphidae
          - - Gastrodontidae
            - Oxychilidae
    - - Parmacelloidea
        - Trigonochlamydidae
        - Parmacellidae
        - Milacidae
      - - - Zonitoidea
            Zonitidae
          - Helicarionoidea
            - Helicarionidae
            - - Ariophantidae
              - Urocyclidae
        - Limacoidea
          - Vitrinidae
          - - Boettgerillidae
            - - Limacidae
              - Agriolimacidae
