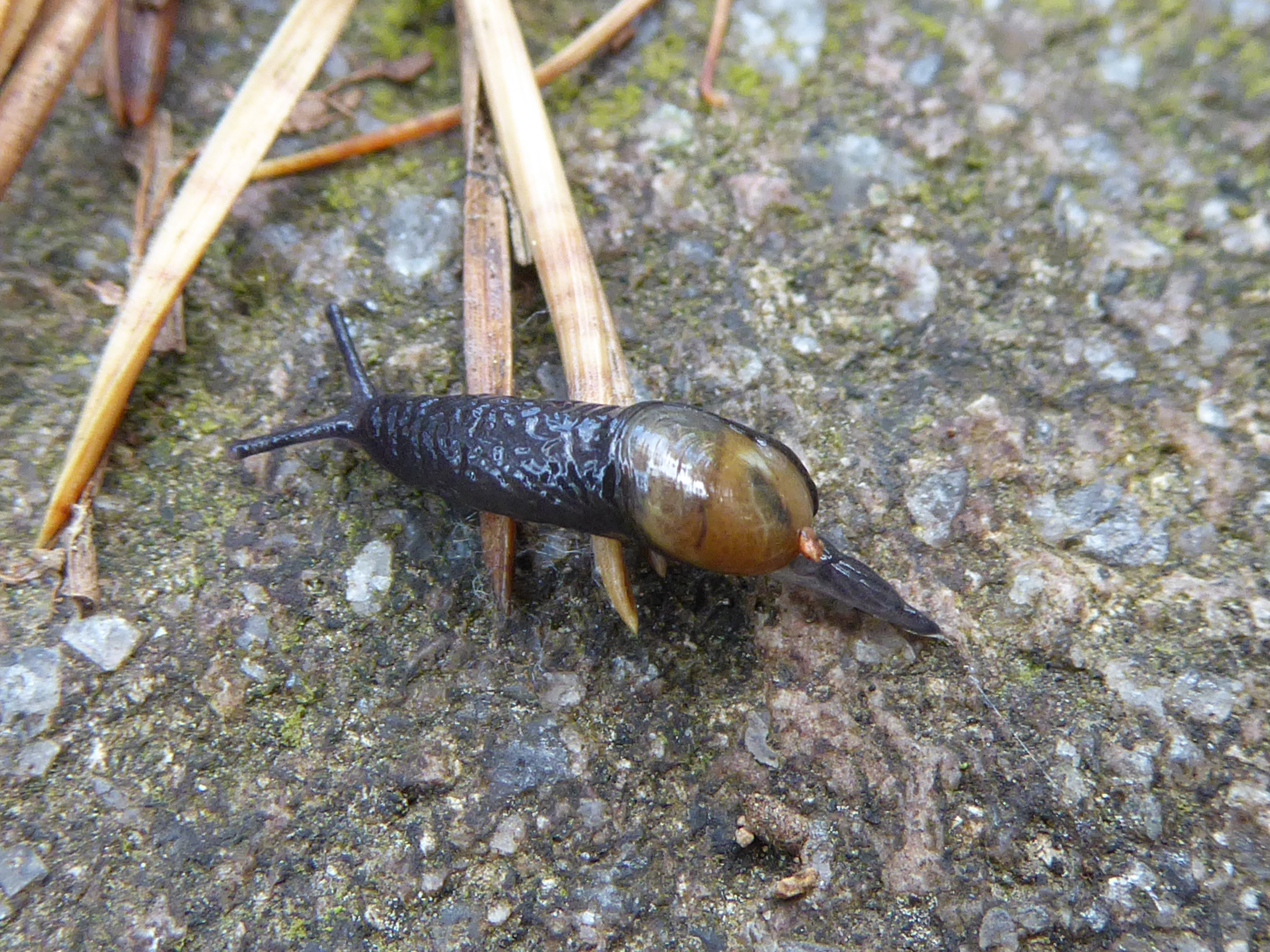
- Unidentified member of the family

Scientific classification
- Kingdom: Animalia
- Phylum: Mollusca
- Class: Gastropoda
- Order: Stylommatophora
- Suborder: Helicina
- Infraorder: Limacoidei
- Superfamily: Limacoidea
- Family: Vitrinidae; Fitzinger, 1833

Genera
- See text

Synonyms
- Phenacolimacinae Schileyko, 1986; Semilimacinae Schileyko, 1986

= Vitrinidae =

Family of gastropods

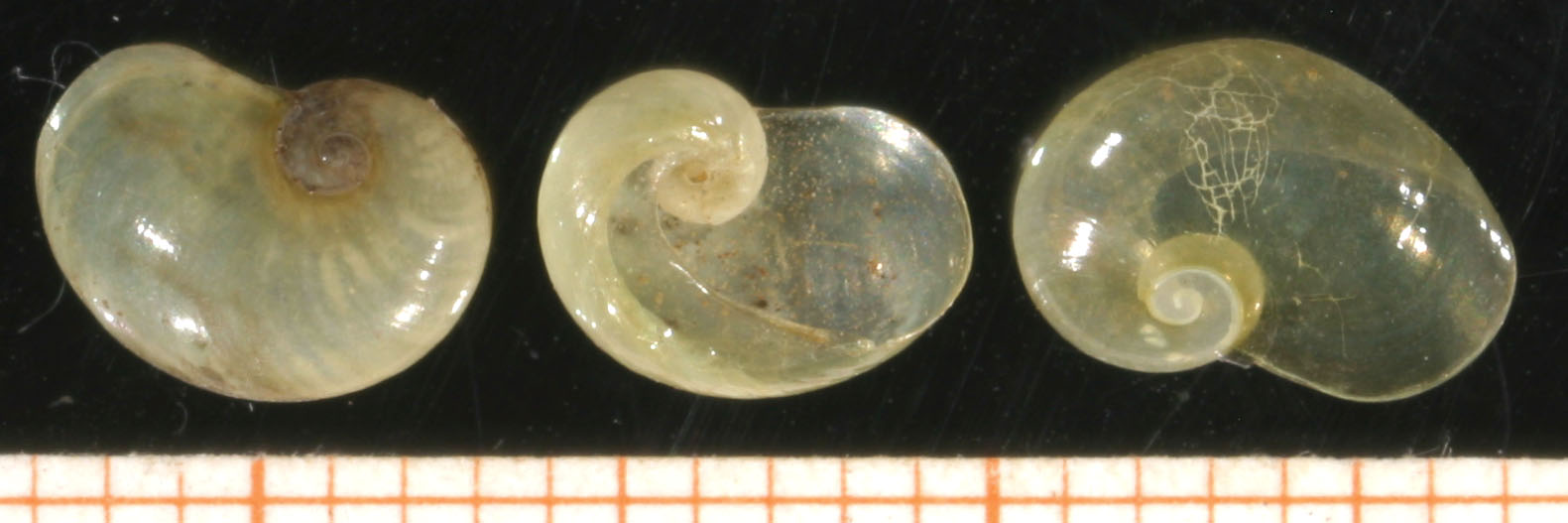
Three shells of Eucobresia diaphana, scale bar in mm

Vitrinidae is a family of small, air-breathing land snails and semi-slugs, terrestrial pulmonate gastropod mollusks in the superfamily Limacoidea (according to the taxonomy of the Gastropoda by Bouchet & Rocroi, 2005).

== Distribution ==
The distribution of the Vitrinidae includes the Nearctic, western Palearctic, eastern Palearctic, and Ethiopian zones, as well as Hawaii.

== Anatomy ==
Snails in this family make and use love darts made of chitin.

In this family, the number of haploid chromosomes lies between 26 and 35 (according to the values in this table).

== Genera ==
Genera in the family Vitrinidae include:

- † Planellavitrina Margry, 2018
- † Provitrina Wenz, 1919

Subfamily Plutoniinae T. Cockerell, 1893

- Arabivitrina Thiele, 1931
- Azorivitrina Giusti, Fiorentino, Benocci & Manganelli, 2011
- Calidivitrina Pilsbry, 1919
- Canarivitrina Valido & M. R. Alonso, 2000
- Guerrina Odhner, 1954
- Insulivitrina P. Hesse, 1923
- Madeirovitrina Groh & Hemmen, 1986
- Megavitrina Bank, Menkhorst & Neubert, 2016
- Phenacolimax Stabile, 1859
- Plutonia Morelet, 1864
- Sanettivitrina Pfarrer, Rowson, Tattersfield & Neubert, 2021
- Sardovitrina Manganelli & Giusti, 2005

Subfamily Vitrininae Fitzinger, 1833

- Eucobresia H. B. Baker, 1929
- Hessemilimax Schileyko, 1986
- Oligolimax P. Fischer, 1878
- Semilimacella Soós, 1917
- Semilimax Gray, 1847
- Vitrina Draparnaud, 1801
- Vitrinobrachium Künkel, 1929

Synonyms

- Balcanovitrina Ošanova & L. Pintér, 1968: synonym of Semilimacella Soós, 1917
- Chlamydea Westerlund, 1886: synonym of Semilimax Gray, 1847
- Cobresia Hübner, 1810: synonym of Vitrina Draparnaud, 1801
- Gallandia Bourguignat, 1880: synonym of Oligolimax P. Fischer, 1878
- Helicolimax J. Férussac, 1807: synonym of Vitrina Draparnaud, 1801
- Hyalina S. Studer, 1820: synonym of Vitrina Draparnaud, 1801 (non Schumacher, 1817)
- Pagana Gistel, 1848: synonym of Vitrina Draparnaud, 1801
- Targionia P. Hesse, 1923: synonym of Semilimacella Soós, 1917
- Tozzettia P. Hesse, 1924: synonym of Semilimacella Soós, 1917
- Trochovitrina O. Boettger, 1880: synonym of Oligolimax P. Fischer, 1878 (junior synonym)
- Vitrinopugio Ihering, 1892: synonym of Semilimax Gray, 1847 (unavailable; objective junior synonym)
- Vitriplutonia Collinge, 1893: synonym of Plutonia Morelet, 1864

== Cladogram ==
A cladogram showing the phylogenic relationships of this family to other families within the limacoid clade:

- limacoid clade
  - Staffordioidea
    Staffordiidae
  - - - Dyakioidea
        Dyakiidae
      - Gastrodontoidea
        - Pristilomatidae
        - - Chronidae
          - - Euconulidae
            - Trochomorphidae
          - - Gastrodontidae
            - Oxychilidae
    - - Parmacelloidea
        - Trigonochlamydidae
        - Parmacellidae
        - Milacidae
      - - - Zonitoidea
            Zonitidae
          - Helicarionoidea
            - Helicarionidae
            - - Ariophantidae
              - Urocyclidae
        - Limacoidea
          - Vitrinidae
          - - Boettgerillidae
            - - Limacidae
              - Agriolimacidae
