= E. flavescens =

E. flavescens may refer to:

- Echeandia flavescens, a herbaceous plant
- Echinocardium flavescens, a heart urchin
- Eicherax flavescens, a robber fly
- Eimeria flavescens, an apicomplexan parasite
- Elachista flavescens, a European moth
- Eleutherodactylus flavescens, a frog endemic to the Dominican Republic
- Elisolimax flavescens, a land snail
- Elleanthus flavescens, a flowering plant
- Empidonax flavescens, a tyrant flycatcher
- Empoasca flavescens, a green leafhopper
- Enneapogon flavescens, an Australian grass
- Eptesicus flavescens, a vesper bat
- Eria flavescens, a flowering plant
- Erebomaster flavescens, a daddy longlegs
- Eublemma flavescens, an owlet moth
- Eucalyptus flavescens, a flowering plant
- Eulaema flavescens, a euglossine bee
- Eumecynostomum flavescens, an acoelomorph worm
- Eurycorypha flavescens, a bush cricket
- Exorista flavescens, a Palearctic fly
