= Elisolimax rufescens =

Conservation status
- Data Deficient (IUCN 2.3)

Scientific classification
- Kingdom: Animalia
- Phylum: Mollusca
- Class: Gastropoda
- Order: Stylommatophora
- Family: Urocyclidae
- Genus: Elisolimax
- Species: E. rufescens

Binomial name
- Elisolimax rufescens (Simroth, 1894)

Synonyms
- Urocyclus rufescens Simroth, 1894

Species of gastropod

Elisolimax rufescens is a species of terrestrial slug in the family Urocyclidae.

This species is endemic to Tanzania. Note, however, that the Global Biodiversity Information Facility has a record from Mozambique.
