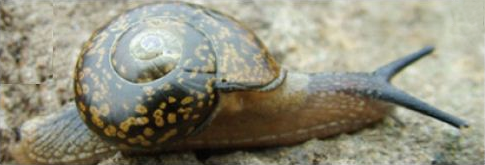
- A live individual of Sheldonia fuscicolor

Scientific classification
- Kingdom: Animalia
- Phylum: Mollusca
- Class: Gastropoda
- Order: Stylommatophora
- Family: Urocyclidae
- Genus: Sheldonia
- Species: S. fuscicolor

Binomial name
- Sheldonia fuscicolor (Melvill & Ponsonby, 1892)

Synonyms
- Vitrina fuscicolor Melvill & Ponsonby, 1892; Kerkophorus fuscicolor (Melvill & Ponsonby, 1892); Microkerkus fuscicolor (Melvill & Ponsonby, 1892)

= Sheldonia fuscicolor =

Species of gastropod

Sheldonia fuscicolor, common name the montane tail-wagger snail, is a species of air-breathing land snail, a terrestrial gastropod mollusk in the family Urocyclidae.

The distribution of this species includes South Africa.
