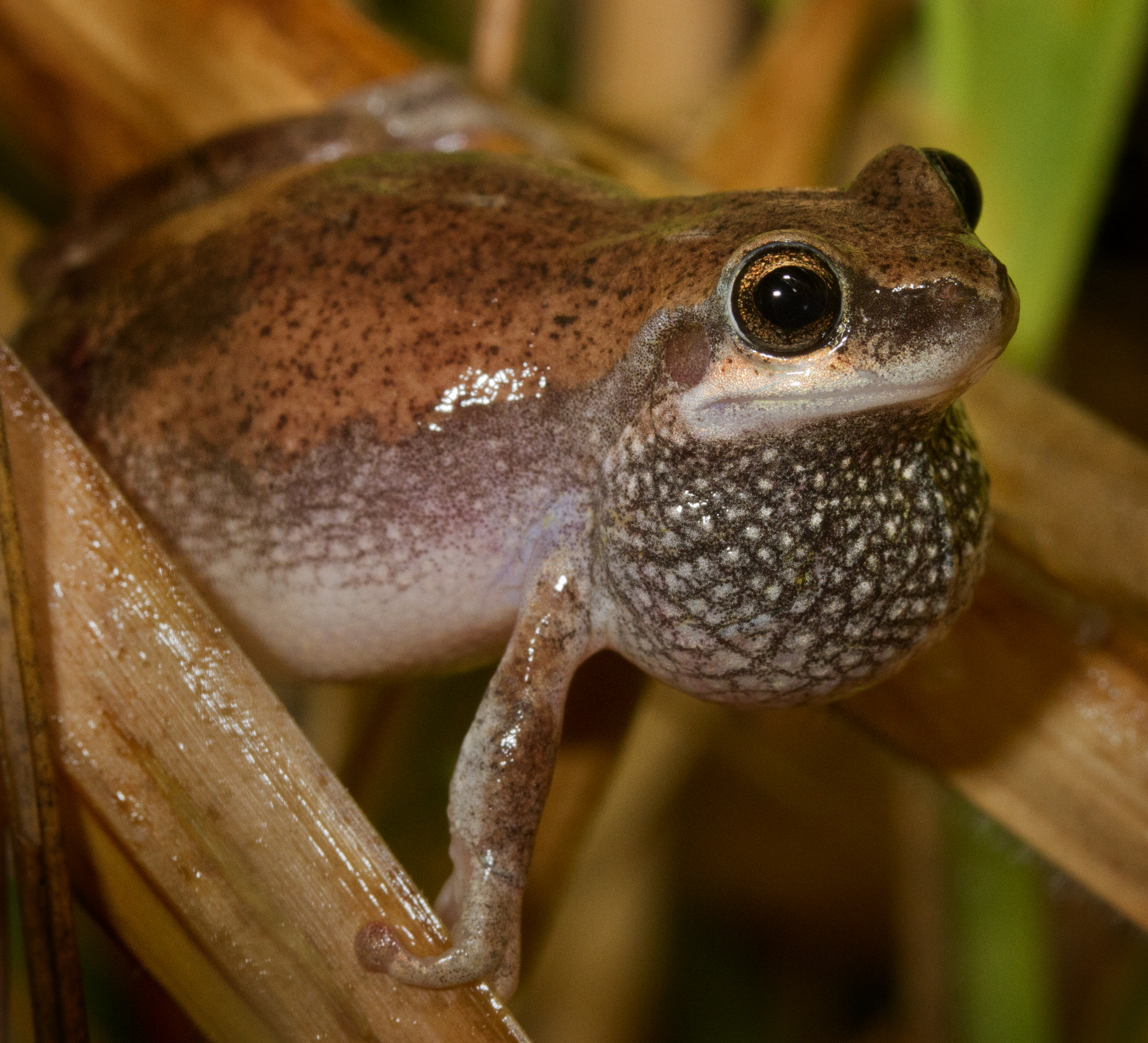
- W

Scientific classification
- Kingdom: Animalia
- Phylum: Chordata
- Class: Amphibia
- Order: Anura
- Family: Pelodryadidae
- Genus: Colleeneremia
- Species: C. pyrina

Binomial name
- Colleeneremia pyrina (Purser, Doughty, Rowley, Böhme, Donnellan, Anstis, Mitchell, Shea, Amey, Mitchell, and Catullo, 2025)

= Ruddy tree frog =

Species of amphibian

The ruddy tree frog (Colleeneremia pyrina) is a species of tree frog in the family Pelodryadidae, endemic to eastern Australia. It is primarily found in human-disturbed habitats, mostly heard calling in suburban and rural areas in eastern Australia. It breeds in still waterbodies, primarily small to large ponds and flooded areas.

The ruddy tree frog is highly variable in colour, ranging from light grey (especially at daytime) to brown to brick red. It is indistinguishable from its closest relatives, the western desert tree frog and the desert tree frog by appearance, and can only be distinguished by location and genetic testing. The entire group are medium-sized frogs, characterised by small heads and short legs.
