= Thapsia usambarensis =

Conservation status
- Data Deficient (IUCN 2.3)

Scientific classification
- Kingdom: Animalia
- Phylum: Mollusca
- Class: Gastropoda
- Order: Stylommatophora
- Family: Urocyclidae
- Genus: Thapsia
- Species: T. usambarensis

Binomial name
- Thapsia usambarensis Verdcourt

Species of gastropod

Thapsia usambarensis is a species of air-breathing land snail or semi-slug, a terrestrial pulmonate gastropod mollusc in the family Helicarionidae. This species is endemic to Tanzania.
