= Thapsia buraensis =

Conservation status
- Endangered (IUCN 3.1)

Scientific classification
- Kingdom: Animalia
- Phylum: Mollusca
- Class: Gastropoda
- Order: Stylommatophora
- Family: Urocyclidae
- Genus: Thapsia
- Species: T. buraensis

Binomial name
- Thapsia buraensis Verdcourt

Species of gastropod

Thapsia buraensis is a species of air-breathing land snail or semi-slug, a terrestrial pulmonate gastropod mollusc in the family Urocyclidae.

== Distribution ==
This species is endemic to Kenya. Its natural habitat is subtropical or tropical dry forests; it is threatened by habitat loss.
