= Leptichnus bernardi =

Conservation status
- Data Deficient (IUCN 2.3)

Scientific classification
- Kingdom: Animalia
- Phylum: Mollusca
- Class: Gastropoda
- Order: Stylommatophora
- Family: Urocyclidae
- Genus: Leptichnus
- Species: L. bernardi

Binomial name
- Leptichnus bernardi van Goethem

Species of gastropod

Leptichnus bernardi is a species of air-breathing land snails or semi-slugs, terrestrial pulmonate gastropod mollusks in the family Urocyclidae.

This species is endemic to Tanzania.
