= Thapsia =

Thapsia is the scientific name of two genera of organisms and may refer to:

- Thapsia (gastropod), a genus of snails in the family Rissoidae
- Thapsia (plant), a genus of plants in the family Apiaceae
