= Thapsia snelli =

Conservation status
- Endangered (IUCN 2.3)

Scientific classification
- Kingdom: Animalia
- Phylum: Mollusca
- Class: Gastropoda
- Order: Stylommatophora
- Family: Urocyclidae
- Genus: Thapsia
- Species: T. snelli

Binomial name
- Thapsia snelli Connolly, 1925

Species of gastropod

Thapsia snelli is a species of air-breathing land snail or semi-slug, a terrestrial pulmonate gastropod mollusc in the family Urocyclidae.

== Distribution ==
This species is endemic to Mauritius.
