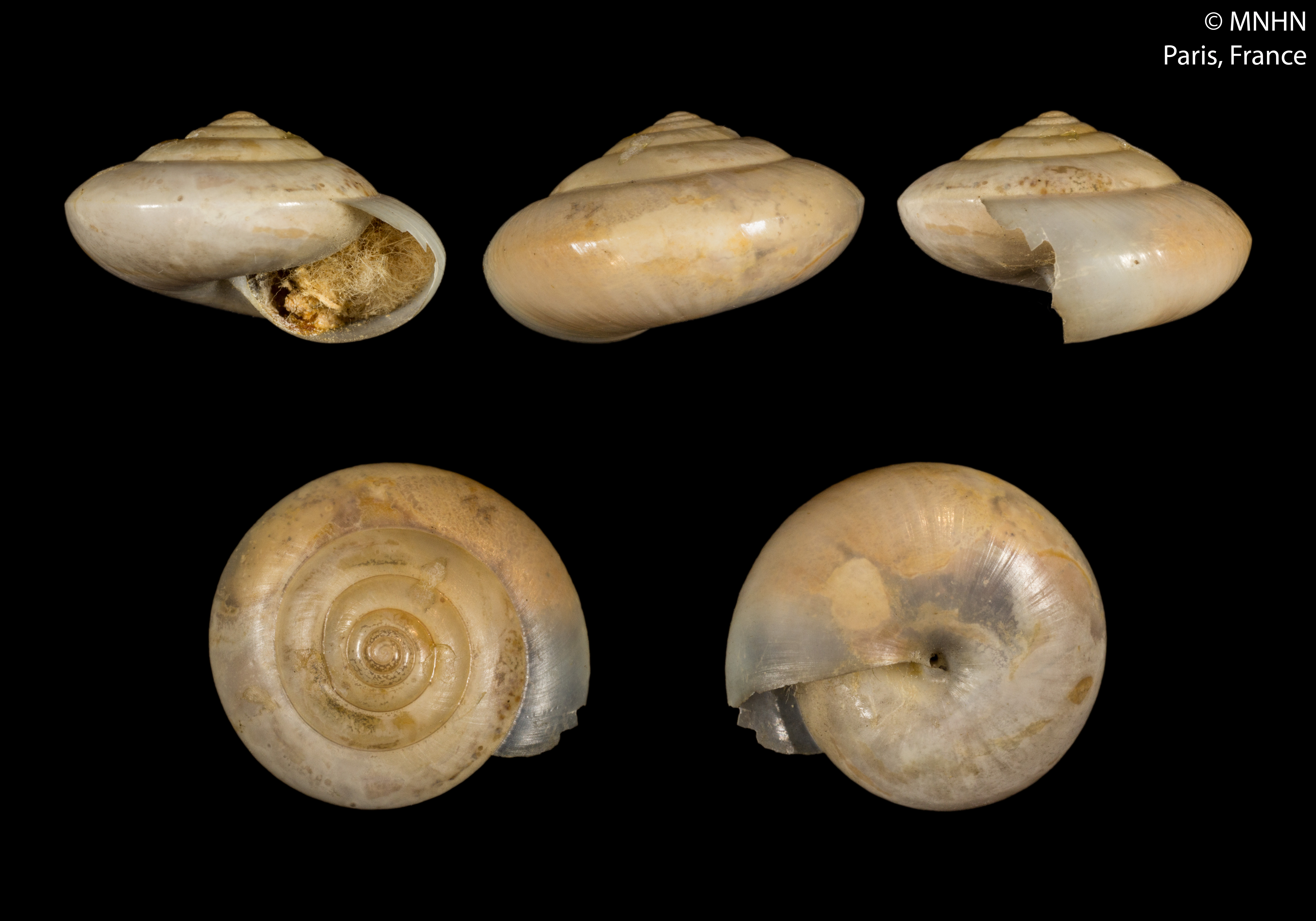

Scientific classification
- Kingdom: Animalia
- Phylum: Mollusca
- Class: Gastropoda
- Order: Stylommatophora
- Family: Urocyclidae
- Genus: Thapsia
- Species: T. troglodytes

Binomial name
- Thapsia troglodytes (Morelet, 1848)

Synonyms
- Helix troglodytes Morelet, 1848

= Thapsia troglodytes =

Species of gastropod

Thapsia troglodytes is a species of air-breathing land snail, a terrestrial pulmonate gastropod mollusc in the family Urocyclidae.

Thapsia troglodytes is the type species of the genus Thaspia.

== Distribution ==
This species occurs in Gabon.
