= Elisolimax flavescens =

Scientific classification
- Kingdom: Animalia
- Phylum: Mollusca
- Class: Gastropoda
- Order: Stylommatophora
- Family: Urocyclidae
- Genus: Elisolimax
- Species: E. flavescens

Binomial name
- Elisolimax flavescens (W. Keferstein, 1866)

Species of gastropod

Elisolimax flavescens is a species of air-breathing land snail in the family Urocyclidae.

Described in 1866 by naturalist Wilhelm Moritz Keferstein, this species occurs primarily in southeastern Africa (eastern South Africa, Zimbabwe, Mozambique). It has not yet become established in the US, but it is considered to represent a potentially serious threat as a pest, an invasive species which could negatively affect agriculture, natural ecosystems, human health or commerce. Therefore, it has been suggested that this species be given top national quarantine significance in the USA.
