= Sheldonia puzeyi =

Conservation status
- Vulnerable (IUCN 3.1)

Scientific classification
- Kingdom: Animalia
- Phylum: Mollusca
- Class: Gastropoda
- Order: Stylommatophora
- Family: Urocyclidae
- Genus: Sheldonia
- Species: S. puzeyi

Binomial name
- Sheldonia puzeyi Connolly, 1939

Species of gastropod

Sheldonia puzeyi is a species of land snail in the family Urocyclidae. This species is endemic to South Africa, where it occurs in a small strip of coastal habitat.
