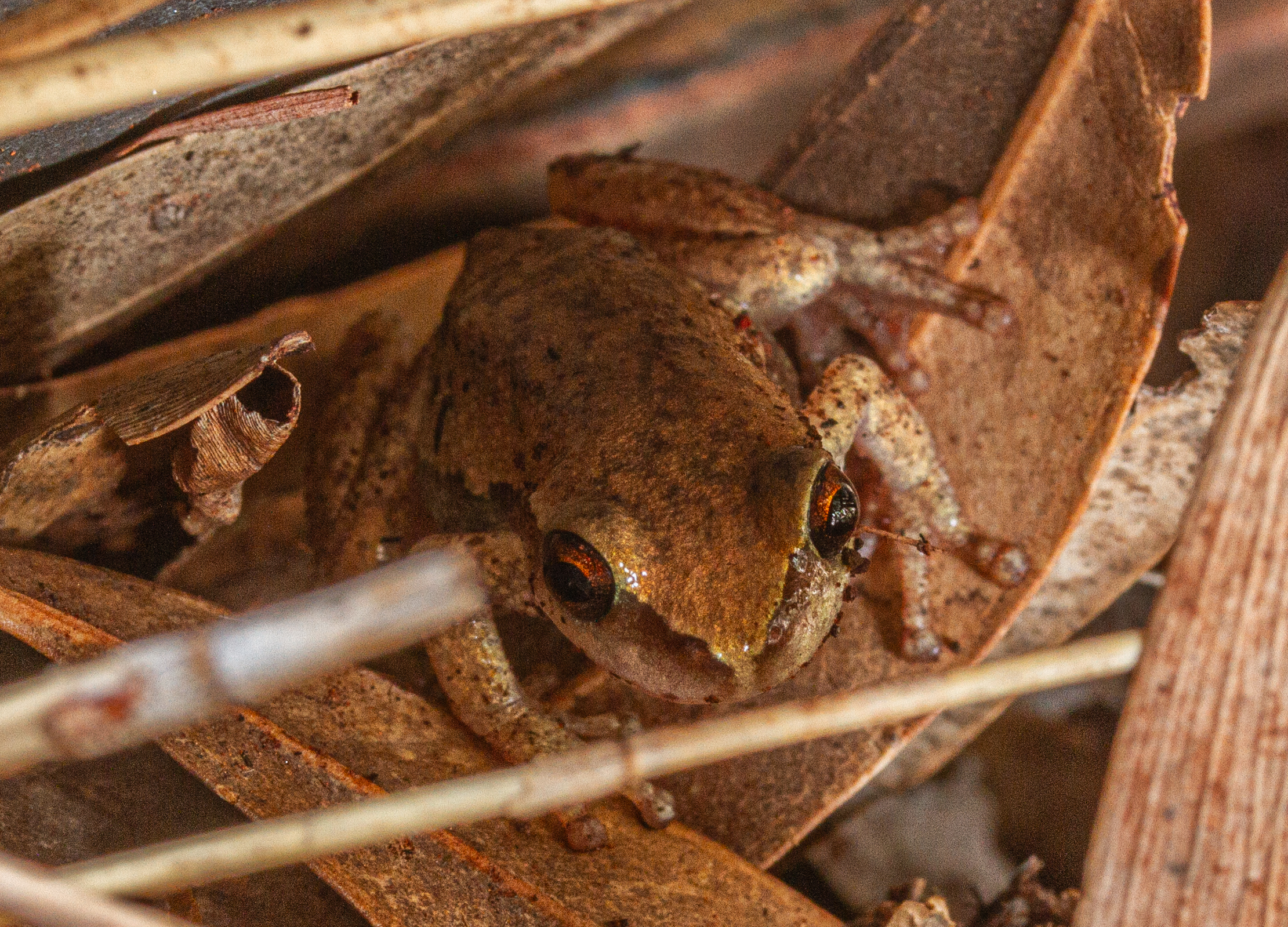
- Western desert frog in Karijini National Park, Western Australia

Scientific classification
- Kingdom: Animalia
- Phylum: Chordata
- Class: Amphibia
- Order: Anura
- Family: Pelodryadidae
- Genus: Colleeneremia
- Species: C. larisonans

Binomial name
- Colleeneremia larisonans (Purser, Doughty, Rowley, Böhme, Donnellan, Anstis, Mitchell, Shea, Amey, Mitchell, and Catullo, 2025)

= Western desert tree frog =

Species of amphibian

The western desert tree frog (Colleeneremia larisonans) is a species of tree frog in the family Pelodryadidae, endemic to the arid and coastal regions of central western Australia. It is primarily found in dry habitats, though in the most arid parts of its distribution, it is restricted to ranges or larger rivers. It breeds in mostly still water, mainly flooded areas and ponds.

The western desert tree frog is highly variable in colour: usually during the heat of the day they are a light grey to prevent water loss, but at night ranges from grey to brown to brick red. It is indistinguishable from its closest relatives, the ruddy tree frog and the desert tree frog by appearance, and can only be distinguished by location and genetic testing. The entire group are medium-sized frogs, characterised by small heads and short legs.
