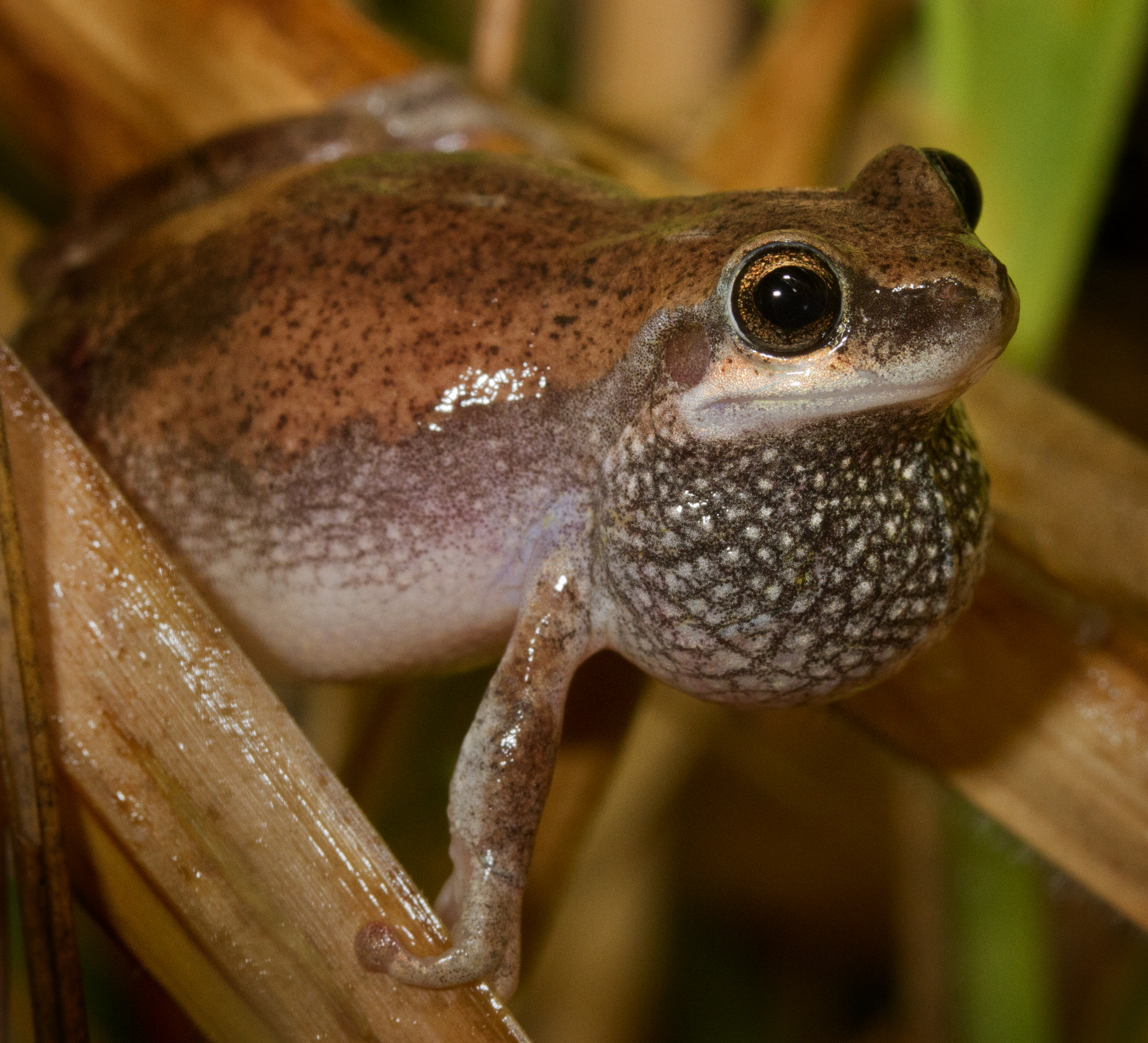
- Male ruddy tree frog (Colleeneremia pyrina), Far North Queensland, Australia

Scientific classification
- Kingdom: Animalia
- Phylum: Chordata
- Class: Amphibia
- Order: Anura
- Family: Pelodryadidae
- Genus: Colleeneremia; Wells & Wellington, 1985

Species
- See text

= Colleeneremia =

Genus of amphibians

Colleeneremia is a genus of arboreal frogs in the family Pelodryadidae. These frogs are native to central, eastern and northern Australia; New Guinea and surrounding islands, and East Nusa Tenggara, Indonesia. They are small-to-medium-sized frogs, inhabiting a very wide range of habitats, from the central deserts of Australia to New Guinea rainforests.

Species in the genus were previously included within the wastebasket genus Litoria, but were separated into the resurrected genus Colleeneremia in 2025. A separate 2025 study found that the Australian Colleeneremia rubella were in fact three distinct species, with one species spread across much of arid central Australia and the tropical savannah in northern Australia. A second species, the western desert tree frog, is found in central western Australia and the third, the ruddy tree frog, is found in Cape York Peninsula and east of the Great Dividing Range.

== Species ==
Common name	Binomial name
Slender bleating tree frog	Colleeneremia balatus (Rowley, Mahony, Hines, Myers, Price, Shea, and Donnellan, 2021)
Samlakki treefrog	Colleeneremia capitula (Tyler, 1968)
Yule Island treefrog	Colleeneremia congenita (Peters and Doria, 1878)
Robust bleating tree frog	Colleeneremia dentata (Keferstein, 1868)
Buzzing tree frog	Colleeneremia electrica (Ingram and Corben, 1990)
Western desert tree frog	Colleeneremia larisonans (Purser, Doughty, Rowley, Böhme, Donnellan, Anstis, Mitchell, Shea, Amey, Mitchell, and Catullo, 2025)
Geelvink pygmy tree frog	Colleeneremia pygmaea (Meyer, 1875)
Ruddy tree frog	Colleeneremia pyrina (Purser, Doughty, Rowley, Böhme, Donnellan, Anstis, Mitchell, Shea, Amey, Mitchell, and Catullo, 2025)
Lined tree frog	Colleeneremia quadrilineata (Tyler and Parker, 1974)
Screaming tree frog	Colleeneremia quiritatus (Rowley, Mahony, Hines, Myers, Price, Shea, and Donnellan, 2021)
Desert tree frog	Colleeneremia rubella (Gray, 1842)
Rueppel's big-eyed tree frog	Colleeneremia rueppelli (Boettger, 1895)
Baliem River Valley tree frog	Colleeneremia umbonata (Tyler and Davies, 1983)
Wissel Lakes tree frog	Colleeneremia wisselensis (Tyler, 1968)
