= Wissel Lakes tree frog =

Conservation status
- Data Deficient (IUCN 3.1)

Scientific classification
- Kingdom: Animalia
- Phylum: Chordata
- Class: Amphibia
- Order: Anura
- Family: Pelodryadidae
- Genus: Colleeneremia
- Species: C. wisselensis

Binomial name
- Colleeneremia wisselensis (Tyler, 1968)

Species of amphibian

The Wissel Lakes tree frog (Colleeneremia wisselensis) is a species of frog in the family Pelodryadidae, endemic to West Papua, Indonesia. Its natural habitats are freshwater lakes, intermittent freshwater lakes, and rocky areas.
