= Zingis radiolata =

Conservation status
- Critically Endangered (IUCN 3.1)

Scientific classification
- Kingdom: Animalia
- Phylum: Mollusca
- Class: Gastropoda
- Order: Stylommatophora
- Family: Helicarionidae
- Genus: Zingis
- Species: Z. radiolata

Binomial name
- Zingis radiolata E. von Martens

Species of gastropod

Zingis radiolata is a species of air-breathing land snail, a terrestrial pulmonate gastropod mollusk in the family Helicarionidae. This family is endemic to Kenya; it is threatened by habitat loss.
