= Robust bleating tree frog =

Conservation status
- Least Concern (IUCN 3.1)

Scientific classification
- Kingdom: Animalia
- Phylum: Chordata
- Class: Amphibia
- Order: Anura
- Family: Pelodryadidae
- Genus: Colleeneremia
- Species: C. dentata

Binomial name
- Colleeneremia dentata (Keferstein, 1868)
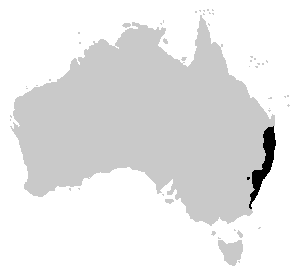
- Distribution of the bleating tree frog, including C. balatus and C. quiritatus

Synonyms
- Hyla dentata Keferstein, 1868; Rawlinsonia dentata Wells and Wellington, 1985; Litoria dentata(Keferstein, 1868)

Species of amphibian

The robust bleating tree frog (Colleeneremia dentata), also known as Keferstein's tree frog, is a species of tree frog in the family Pelodryadidae. This frog is endemic to coastal eastern Australia, where it ranges from northeastern New South Wales to the NSW/Queensland border. It has also been introduced to Lord Howe Island.

== Taxonomy ==
Prior to 2021, this species was thought to have a much wider range, from northeastern Victoria to southern Queensland, and was simply known as the bleating tree frog. However, Rowley et al (2021) distinguished three distinct clades within the species, based on genetic divergence, slight morphological differences, and notable differences in vocalizations; the latter were collected via the FrogID Australia citizen science project. Two new species were described from north and south of C. dentata's range: the slender bleating tree frog (C. balatus) to the north and the screaming tree frog (C. quiritatus) to the south. This significantly reduced the known range for C. dentata, although it is known to still be a common and adaptable species.

== Description ==
This species can be distinguished from the two species split off from it by its more robust build compared to C. balatus and a brownish vocal sac that turns dull yellow when fully inflated.

== Ecology and behaviour ==
This frog is associated with coastal lagoons, ponds and swamps, in heathland, sclerophyll forest and cleared farmland. The bleating tree frog is well known for its loud, high-pitched call, which can be painful to humans nearby. Males call from vegetation or ground around the breeding site. Mass breeding and calling can take place on warm, wet, overcast nights during spring and summer.

== Pet ownership ==
To own a frog in Australia, one must obtain a permit. In New South Wales, where the frog is endemic, native frogs additionally must be bred in captivity and cannot be forcibly taken from their habitats. Native amphibians are, in general, protected by the Biodiversity Conservation Act 2016, which established this requirement.
