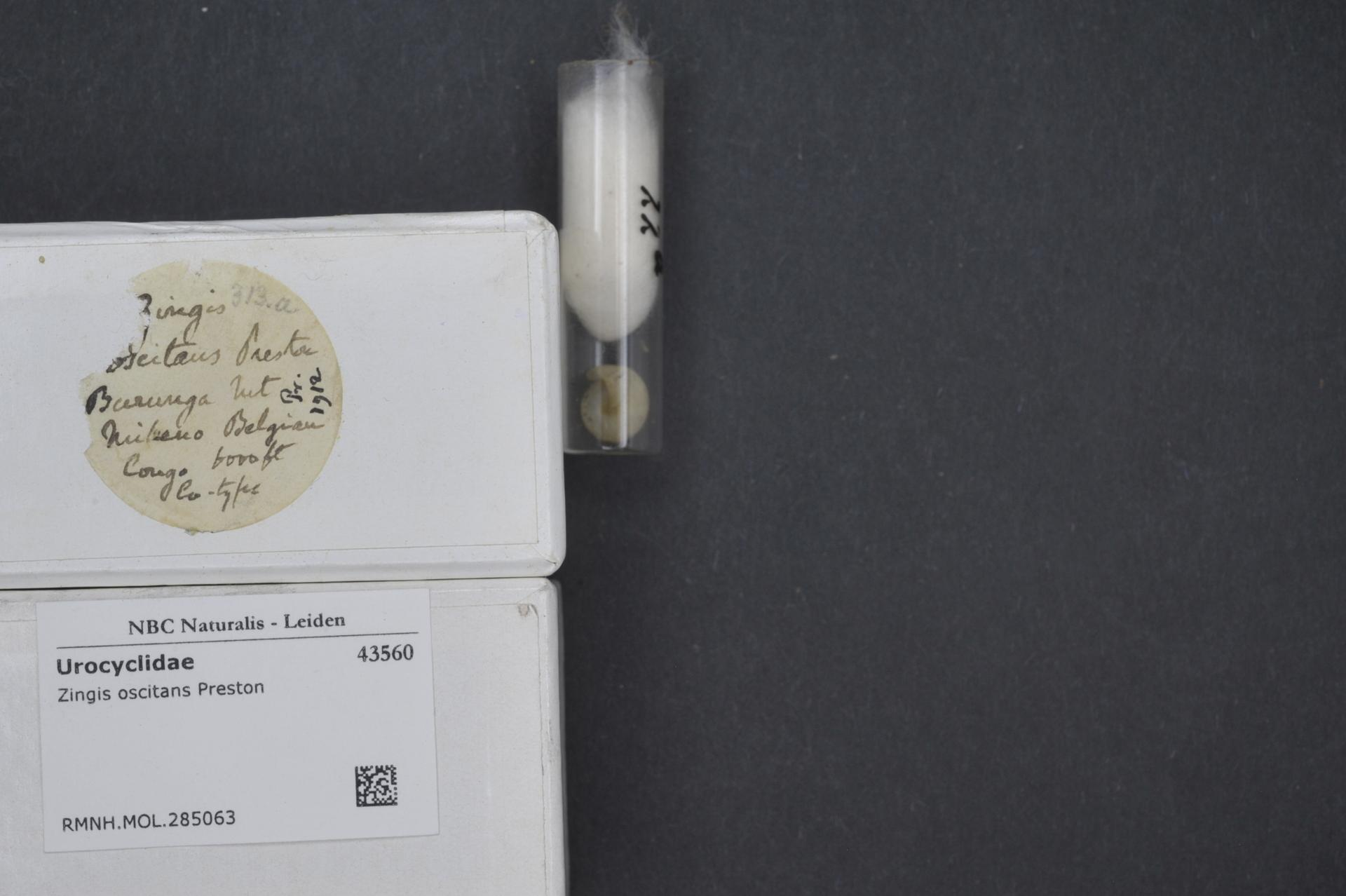
- Zingis oscitans Preston - Urocyclidae - Mollusc shell

Scientific classification
- Kingdom: Animalia
- Phylum: Mollusca
- Class: Gastropoda
- Order: Stylommatophora
- Family: Helicarionidae
- Genus: Zingis von Martens, 1878

= Zingis =

Genus of gastropods

Zingis is a genus of air-breathing land snails, terrestrial pulmonate gastropod mollusks in the family Urocyclidae.

== Species ==
Species in the genus Zingis include:

- Zingis bequaerti Dautzenberg & Germain, 1914
- Zingis chirindensis van Bruggen & Verdcourt, 1968
- Zingis dainellii Piersanti, 1939
- Zingis johnstoni E. A. Smith, 1899
- Zingis neghelliana Piersanti, 1939
- Zingis radiolata E. von Martens, 1878
- Zingis whytei E. A. Smith, 1894
