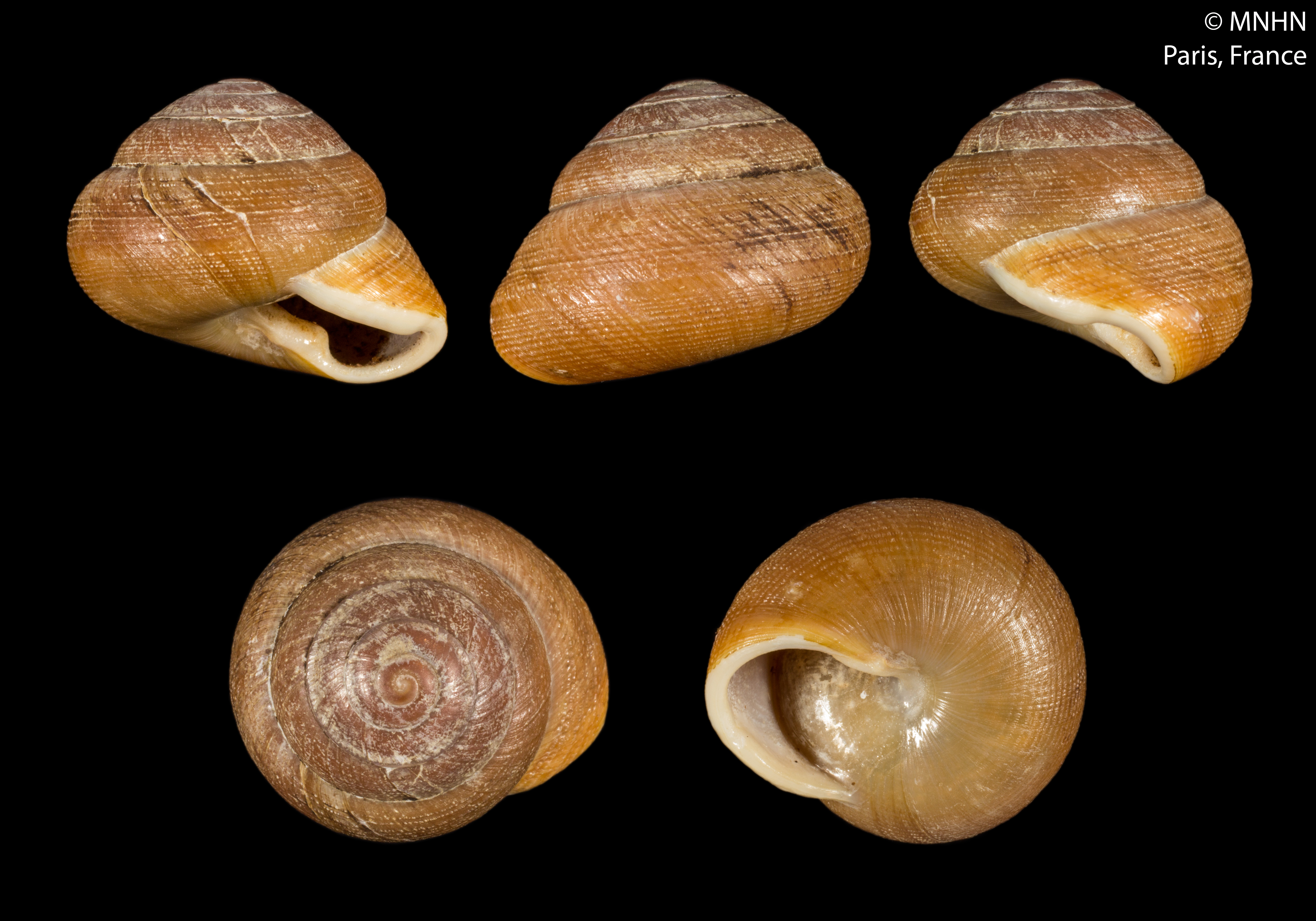
- Shell of Rhysotina welwitschi (syntype at MNHN, Paris)

Scientific classification
- Kingdom: Animalia
- Phylum: Mollusca
- Class: Gastropoda
- Order: Stylommatophora
- Infraorder: Limacoidei
- Superfamily: Helicarionoidea
- Family: Urocyclidae
- Genus: Rhysotina; Ancey, 1887

Type species
- Helix welwitschi Morelet, 1866

Synonyms
- Thomeonanina Germain, 1909 (objective synonym)

= Rhysotina =

Genus of gastropods

Rhysotina is a genus of minute, air-breathing land snails, terrestrial pulmonate gastropod mollusks or micromollusks in the subfamily Rhysotininae of the family Urocyclidae.

== Species ==
Species within the genus Rhysotina include:

- Rhysotina hepatizon (Gould, 1845)
- Rhysotina sublaevis G. A. Holyoak & D. T. Holyoak, 2016
- Rhysotina welwitschi (Morelet, 1866)
