= Geelvink pygmy tree frog =

Conservation status
- Least Concern (IUCN 3.1)

Scientific classification
- Kingdom: Animalia
- Phylum: Chordata
- Class: Amphibia
- Order: Anura
- Family: Pelodryadidae
- Genus: Colleeneremia
- Species: C. pygmaea

Binomial name
- Colleeneremia pygmaea (Meyer, 1875)

Species of amphibian

The Geelvink pygmy tree frog (Colleeneremia pygmaea) is a species of frog in the family Pelodryadidae. It is found in New Guinea. Its common name refers to Geelvink Bay (presently Cenderawasih Bay) where its type locality, the Yapen island lies. Its natural habitats are subtropical or tropical moist lowland forests, freshwater marshes, intermittent freshwater marshes, rural gardens, urban areas, and canals and ditches.
