= Yule Island tree frog =

Conservation status
- Least Concern (IUCN 3.1)

Scientific classification
- Kingdom: Animalia
- Phylum: Chordata
- Class: Amphibia
- Order: Anura
- Family: Pelodryadidae
- Genus: Colleeneremia
- Species: C. congenita

Binomial name
- Colleeneremia congenita (Peters & Doria, 1878)

Species of amphibian

The Yule Island tree frog (Colleeneremia congenita) is a species of frog in the family Pelodryadidae. It is found usually in Southern Papua New Guinea. Its natural habitats are moist savanna, intermittent freshwater marshes, rural gardens, and heavily degraded former forests, ranging in altitude from sea level to around 500m (1650FT) ASL.
