= Rueppel's big-eyed tree frog =

Conservation status
- Vulnerable (IUCN 3.1)

Scientific classification
- Kingdom: Animalia
- Phylum: Chordata
- Class: Amphibia
- Order: Anura
- Family: Pelodryadidae
- Genus: Colleeneremia
- Species: C. rueppelli

Binomial name
- Colleeneremia rueppelli (Boettger, 1895)

Synonyms
- Nyctimystes rueppelli (Boettger, 1895)

Species of amphibian

Rueppel's big-eyed tree frog (Colleeneremia rueppelli) is a species of frog in the family Pelodryadidae. It is endemic to Indonesia. Its natural habitats are subtropical or tropical moist lowland forests, subtropical or tropical moist montane forests, and rivers. It is threatened by habitat loss.
