= Baliem River Valley tree frog =

Conservation status
- Data Deficient (IUCN 3.1)

Scientific classification
- Kingdom: Animalia
- Phylum: Chordata
- Class: Amphibia
- Order: Anura
- Family: Pelodryadidae
- Genus: Colleeneremia
- Species: C. umbonata

Binomial name
- Colleeneremia umbonata Tyler & Davies, 1983

Species of amphibian

The Baliem River Valley tree frog (Colleeneremia umbonata) is a species of frog in the subfamily Pelodryadinae, endemic to West Papua, Indonesia. Its natural habitats are subtropical or tropical high-altitude grassland, freshwater marshes, and rural gardens.
