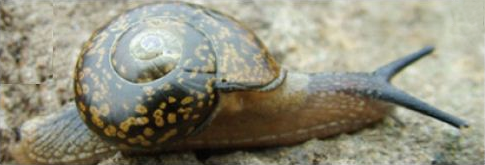
- Montane tail-wagger snail, Sheldonia fuscicolor

Scientific classification
- Kingdom: Animalia
- Phylum: Mollusca
- Class: Gastropoda
- Order: Stylommatophora
- Family: Urocyclidae
- Genus: Sheldonia; Ancey, 1887

Synonyms
- Peltatus Godwin-Austen, 1908

= Sheldonia =

Genus of gastropods

Sheldonia is a genus of air-breathing land snails, terrestrial gastropod mollusks in the family Urocyclidae. Sheldonia is the type genus of the subfamily Sheldoniinae.

== Distribution ==
The distribution of this genus includes South Africa.

== Species ==
Species within the genus Sheldonia include:

- Sheldonia aloicola (Melvill & Ponsonby, 1890)
- Sheldonia asthenes (Melvill & Ponsonby, 1907)
- Sheldonia caledonensis (Godwin-Austen, 1912)
- Sheldonia capsula (W. H. Benson, 1864)
- Sheldonia cotyledonis (W. H. Benson, 1850)
- Sheldonia crawfordi (Melvill & Ponsonby, 1890)
- Sheldonia fingolandensis D. G. Herbert, 2017
- Sheldonia hudsoniae (W. H. Benson, 1864)
- Sheldonia monsmaripi D. G. Herbert, 2016
- Sheldonia natalensis (L. Pfeiffer, 1846)
- Sheldonia phytostylus (W. H. Benson, 1864)
- Sheldonia trotteriana (W. H. Benson, 1848)
- Sheldonia wolkbergensis D. G. Herbert, 2016

Synonyms

- Sheldonia fuscicolor (Melvill & Ponsonby, 1892): synonym of Microkerkus fuscicolor (Melvill & Ponsonby, 1892)
- Sheldonia puzeyi Connolly, 1939: synonym of Kerkophorus puzeyi (Connolly, 1939) (original combination)
- Sheldonia poeppigiiL. Pfeiffer, 1846): synonym of Kerkophorus poeppigii (L. Pfeiffer, 1846)
