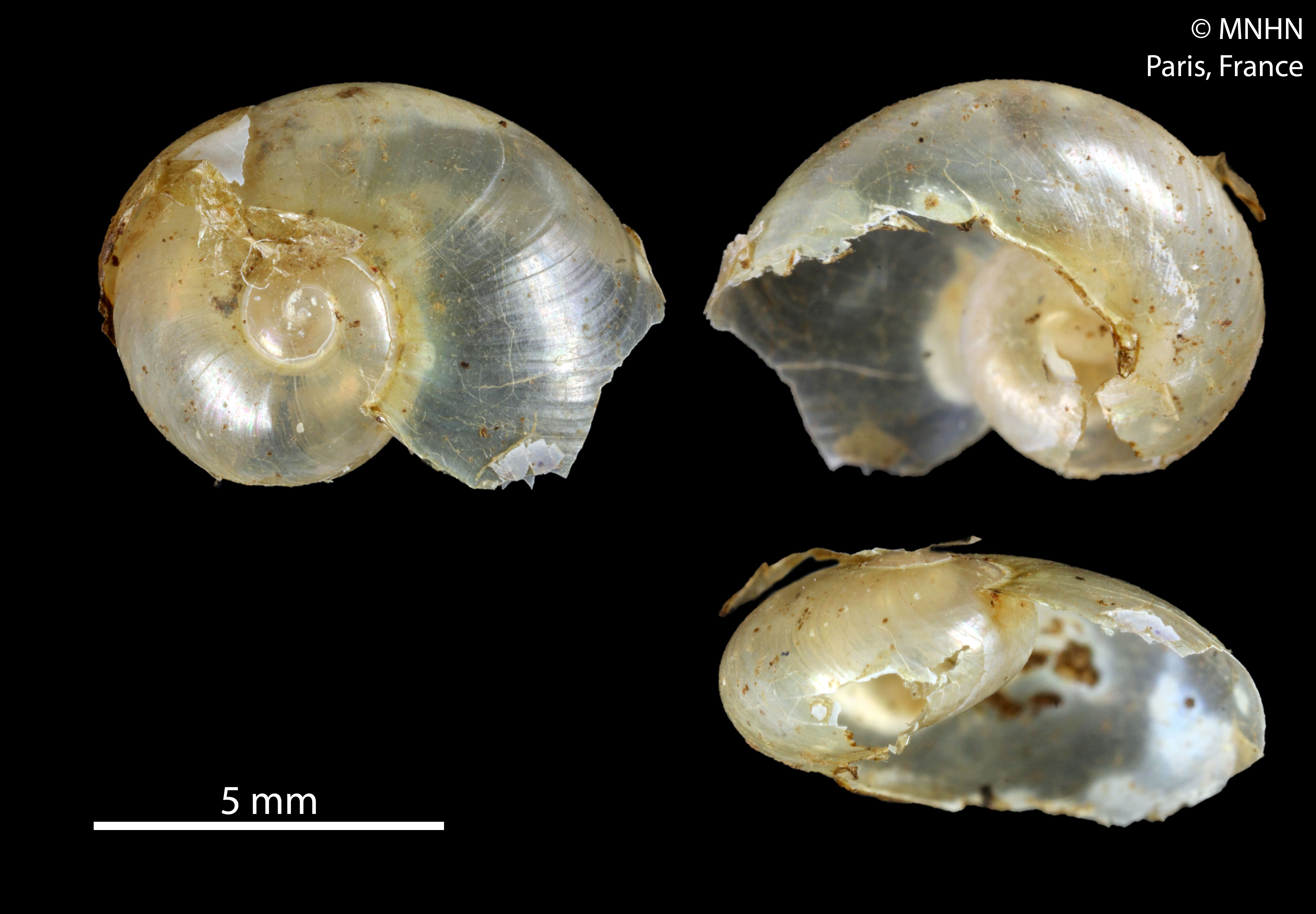
- Shell of Malagarion tillieri (paratype at MNHN, Paris)

Scientific classification
- Domain: Eukaryota
- Kingdom: Animalia
- Phylum: Mollusca
- Class: Gastropoda
- Order: Stylommatophora
- Infraorder: Limacoidei
- Superfamily: Helicarionoidea
- Family: Urocyclidae
- Genus: Malagarion; Tillier, 1979

Type species
- Malagarion paenelimax Tillier, 1979

= Malagarion =

Genus of gastropods

Malagarion is a genus of air-breathing land snails, terrestrial pulmonate gastropod mollusks or micromollusks in the subfamily Sheldoniinae of the family Urocyclidae.

== Species ==
Species within the genus Malagarion include:

- Malagarion andampibei Emberton, 1994
- Malagarion andranomenae Emberton, 1994
- Malagarion antalahae Emberton, 1994
- Malagarion borbonicus (Morelet, 1860)
- Malagarion microstriolatus Emberton, 1994
- Malagarion paenelimax Tillier, 1979
- Malagarion tillieri Emberton & Pearce, 2000
