= Atrichotoxon usambarense =

Conservation status
- Data Deficient (IUCN 2.3)

Scientific classification
- Kingdom: Animalia
- Phylum: Mollusca
- Class: Gastropoda
- Order: Stylommatophora
- Family: Helicarionidae
- Genus: Atrichotoxon
- Species: A. usambarense

Binomial name
- Atrichotoxon usambarense Verdcourt

Species of gastropod

Atrichotoxon usambarense is a species of air-breathing land snail, a terrestrial pulmonate gastropod mollusk in the family Helicarionidae and the genus Atrichotoxon. This species is endemic to Tanzania. Atrichotoxon usambarense has most recently been assessed for The IUCN Red List of Threatened Species in 1996. A. usambarense is listed as Data Deficient. Atrichotoxon usambarense was described in 1961 by malacologist Bernard Verdcourt.
