= Lined tree frog =

Conservation status
- Data Deficient (IUCN 3.1)

Scientific classification
- Kingdom: Animalia
- Phylum: Chordata
- Class: Amphibia
- Order: Anura
- Family: Pelodryadidae
- Genus: Colleeneremia
- Species: C. quadrilineata

Binomial name
- Colleeneremia quadrilineata Tyler & Parker, 1974

Species of frog

The lined tree frog (Colleeneremia quadrilineata) is a species of frog that belongs to the subfamily Pelodryadidae. This species is endemic to West Papua, Indonesia only being found near Merauke. This species can naturally be found inhabiting forests, swamps, inland wetlands and urban areas.

== Conservation ==
Much about this species conservation and its population are unknown including possible threats to this species. Due to data deficiency, it has not been given an conservation class.

While there are no records of infectious amphibian fungi such as Batrachochytrium species (B. dendrobatidis and B. salamandrivorans) on New Guinea, human activity may introduce these fungi to the island. Due to the warm climate of lowland New Guinea, the risk of fungal infections to lowland frog species such as the lined tree frog may be lowered.

=== Pet trade ===
The lined tree frog has only been found once in the national pet trade in Jakarta, the capital city of Indonesia.
