= Atoxon =

Scientific classification
- Kingdom: Animalia
- Phylum: Mollusca
- Class: Gastropoda
- Order: Stylommatophora
- Family: Urocyclidae
- Genus: Atoxon; Simroth, 1888

Genus of gastropods

Atoxon is a genus of gastropods belonging to the family Urocyclidae.

The species of this genus are found in Africa.

Species:

- Atoxon cavallii Pollonera, 1906
- Atoxon fuelleborni Simroth, 1910
- Atoxon hildebrandti Simroth, 1889
- Atoxon kiboense Verdcourt, 1960
- Atoxon martensi Simroth, 1910
- Atoxon pallens Simroth, 1895
- Atoxon schulzei Simroth, 1889
