= Buzzing tree frog =

Conservation status
- Least Concern (IUCN 3.1)

Scientific classification
- Kingdom: Animalia
- Phylum: Chordata
- Class: Amphibia
- Order: Anura
- Family: Pelodryadidae
- Genus: Colleeneremia
- Species: C. electrica

Binomial name
- Colleeneremia electrica Ingram & Corben, 1990

Species of amphibian

The buzzing tree frog (Colleeneremia electrica) is a species of frog in the subfamily Pelodryadinae. It is endemic to Australia. Its natural habitats are temperate forests, subtropical or tropical swamps, swamps, intermittent freshwater lakes, intermittent freshwater marshes, and urban areas.
