= Samlakki tree frog =

Conservation status
- Data Deficient (IUCN 3.1)

Scientific classification
- Kingdom: Animalia
- Phylum: Chordata
- Class: Amphibia
- Order: Anura
- Family: Pelodryadidae
- Genus: Colleeneremia
- Species: C. capitula

Binomial name
- Colleeneremia capitula (Tyler, 1968)

Species of amphibian

The Samlakki tree frog (Colleeneremia capitula) is a species of frog in the family Pelodryadidae. It is endemic to Tanimbar, Indonesia. Its natural habitats are subtropical or tropical dry forests.
