= Trochonanina =

Scientific classification
- Kingdom: Animalia
- Phylum: Mollusca
- Class: Gastropoda
- Order: Stylommatophora
- Family: Urocyclidae
- Subfamily: Sheldoniinae
- Genus: Trochonanina; Mousson, 1869

Genus of gastropods

Trochonanina is a genus of gastropods belonging to the family Urocyclidae.

The species of this genus are found in Africa and Malesia.

Species:

- Trochonanina acutecarinata Thiele, 1911
- Trochonanina aethiopica (Thiele, 1933)
- Trochonanina albolabiata E.A.Smith, 1897
- Trochonanina albopicta (E.von Martens, 1869)
- Trochonanina alfieriana (Bourguignat, 1885)
- Trochonanina bloyeti Bourguignat, 1890
- Trochonanina bollingeri I.Rensch, 1935
- Trochonanina bonhouri Rochebrune & Germain, 1904
- Trochonanina bowkerae (Preston, 1906)
- Trochonanina bunguranensis E.A.Smith, 1894
- Trochonanina calabarica (L.Pfeiffer, 1857)
- Trochonanina connollyi (Haas, 1932)
- Trochonanina consociata (E.A.Smith, 1899)
- Trochonanina coryndoni Verdcourt, 1963
- Trochonanina dendrotrochoides I.Rensch, 1930
- Trochonanina densestriata Thiele, 1911
- Trochonanina dybowskii (Germain, 1923)
- Trochonanina elatior (E.von Martens, 1866)
- Trochonanina elgonensis (Preston, 1914)
- Trochonanina episcopalis E.A.Smith, 1890
- Trochonanina eussoensis (Preston, 1914)
- Trochonanina formosa (Bourguignat, 1885)
- Trochonanina germaini C.R.Boettger, 1913
- Trochonanina gigas (Connolly, 1925)
- Trochonanina gracilior I.Rensch, 1935
- Trochonanina gracilistriata Verdcourt, 1963
- Trochonanina gwendolinae (Preston, 1910)
- Trochonanina heraclea E.A.Smith, 1895
- Trochonanina inflata (Preston, 1913)
- Trochonanina inflata (Thiele, 1933)
- Trochonanina insignis (Bourguignat, 1885)
- Trochonanina jingaensis (Preston, 1914)
- Trochonanina koenigi (C.R.Boettger, 1915)
- Trochonanina lessensis (Pilsbry, 1919)
- Trochonanina levistriata (Preston, 1913)
- Trochonanina martensiana (Preston, 1910)
- Trochonanina mesogaea E.von Martens, 1895
- Trochonanina miocenica Verdcourt, 1963
- Trochonanina mioelgonensis Pickford, 2019
- Trochonanina monozonata (Preston, 1910)
- Trochonanina mozambicensis (L.Pfeiffer, 1855)
- Trochonanina multisulcata Germain, 1915
- Trochonanina mwanihanae Rowson & Van Goethem, 2012
- Trochonanina nyiroensis (Preston, 1913)
- Trochonanina obtusangula E.von Martens, 1895
- Trochonanina pitmani Connolly, 1942
- Trochonanina plicatula (E.von Martens, 1869)
- Trochonanina pseudomozambicensis Verdcourt, 1963
- Trochonanina pyramidea (E.von Martens, 1869)
- Trochonanina rodhaini Dautzenberg & Germain, 1914
- Trochonanina rosenbergi (Preston, 1909)
- Trochonanina rothschildi (Neuville & Anthony, 1906)
- Trochonanina shimbiensis (Preston, 1910)
- Trochonanina smithi Bourguignat, 1890
- Trochonanina solida (Preston, 1913)
- Trochonanina sororcula I.Rensch, 1935
- Trochonanina sturanyi Brancsik, 1895
- Trochonanina talcosa (Gould, 1850)
- Trochonanina thermarum (Melvill & Ponsonby, 1909)
- Trochonanina tulearensis (Fischer-Piette & Salvat, 1966)
- Trochonanina tumidula E.von Martens, 1876
- Trochonanina voiensis (Preston, 1913)
- Trochonanina zeltneri Rochebrune & Germain, 1904
