= Buettneria (gastropod) =

Scientific classification
- Kingdom: Animalia
- Phylum: Mollusca
- Class: Gastropoda
- Order: Stylommatophora
- Infraorder: Limacoidei
- Superfamily: Helicarionoidea
- Family: Urocyclidae
- Genus: Buettneria; Simroth, 1888

Type species
- Buettneria leuckarti Simroth, 188

Synonyms
- Buettnerella Simroth, 1910

Genus of gastropods

Buettneria is a genus of air-breathing land snails, terrestrial gastropod mollusks in the family Urocyclidae.

Buettnerella was the nomen novum for Buettneria Simroth, 1888.

== Species ==
There are two species within the genus Buettneria:

- Buettneria garambaensis Van Goethem, 1975
- Buettneria leuckharti Simroth, 1889
