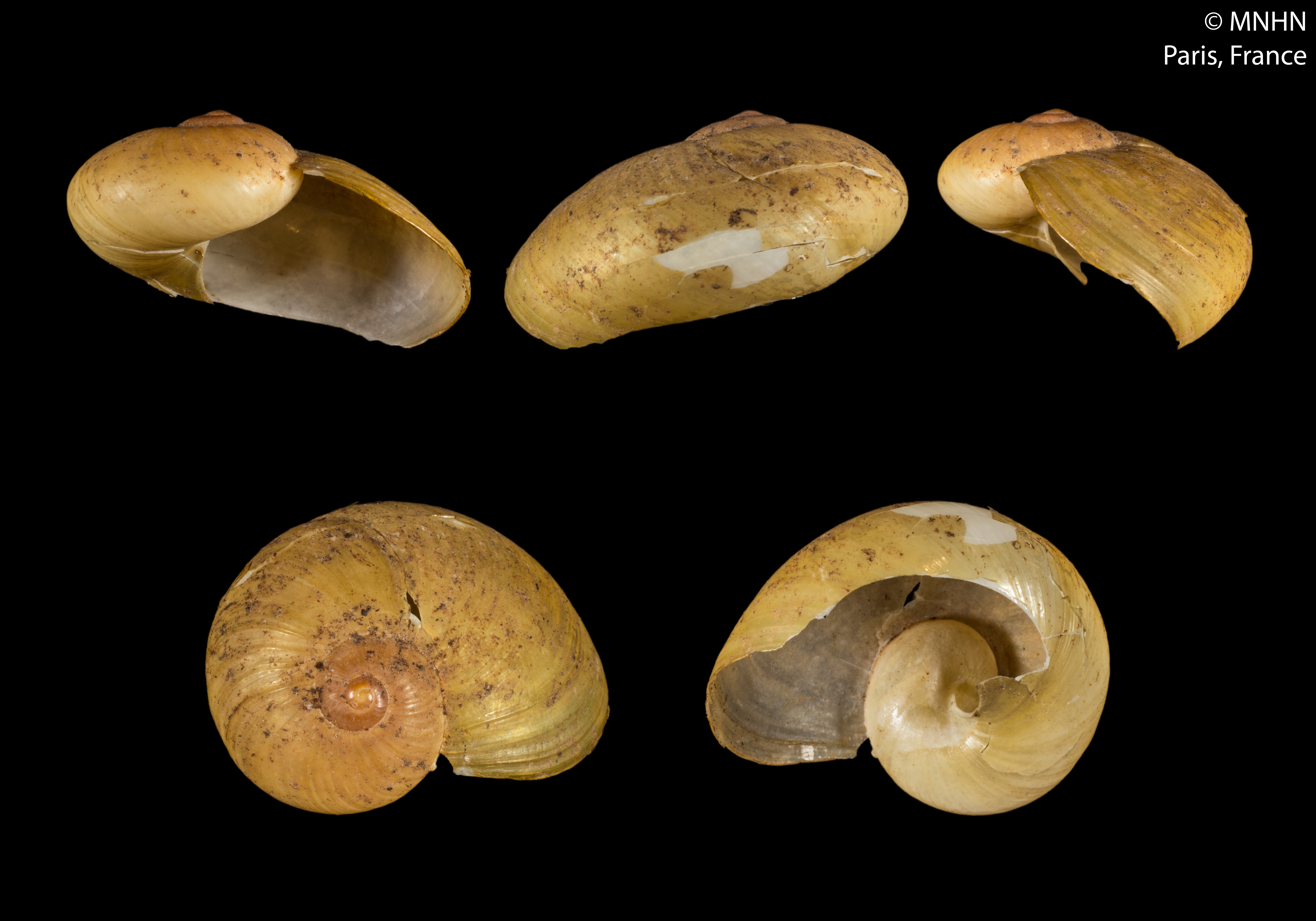
- Shell of Gymnarion gomesiana (syntype at MNHN, Paris)

Scientific classification
- Kingdom: Animalia
- Phylum: Mollusca
- Class: Gastropoda
- Order: Stylommatophora
- Infraorder: Limacoidei
- Superfamily: Helicarionoidea
- Family: Urocyclidae
- Genus: Gymnarion; Pilsbry, 1919

Type species
- Helicarion aloysii-sabaudiae Pollonera, 1906

Synonyms
- Helicarion (Gymnarion) Pilsbry, 1919

= Gymnarion =

Genus of gastropods

Gymnarion is a genus of air-breathing land snails, terrestrial pulmonate gastropod mollusks or micromollusks in the family Urocyclidae.

== Description ==
(Original description) These helixarionid snails possess minute, remote right and left shell-lobes. The penis features a subterminal retractor muscle and an epiphallus, the latter lacking a flagellum or other appendages. A long, club-shaped dart sac (amatorial gland) is present.

== Species ==
Species within the genus Gymnarion include:

- Gymnarion aloysiisabaudiae (Pollonera, 1906)
- Gymnarion anchora E. Binder, 1971
- Gymnarion apertus E. Binder, 1979
- Gymnarion bequaerti E. Binder, 1979
- Gymnarion cheranganiensis Connolly, 1925
- Gymnarion chinegris E. Binder, 1979
- Gymnarion chirindicus E. Binder, 1981
- Gymnarion columna E. Binder, 1971
- Gymnarion corneola (Morelet, 1867)
- Gymnarion coronatus E. Binder, 1976
- Gymnarion ducae E. Binder, 1976
- Gymnarion gomesiana (Morelet, 1867)
- Gymnarion grandis (H. Beck, 1838)
- Gymnarion grossans E. Binder, 1971
- Gymnarion masukuensis (E. A. Smith, 1899)
- Gymnarion medjensis Pilsbry, 1919
- Gymnarion membranaceus (Thiele, 1911)
- Gymnarion nyasanus (E.A. Smith, 1899)
- Gymnarion plicatulus (E. von Martens, 1876)
- Gymnarion scutum E. Binder, 1971
- Gymnarion sigaretinus (Récluz, 1841)
- Gymnarion sowerbyanus (L. Pfeiffer, 1849)
- Gymnarion tanganyicae (E. von Martens, 1895)
- Gymnarion upembae E. Binder, 1979
- Gymnarion vanmoli E. Binder, 1979
- Gymnarion vumbae E. Binder, 1981
- Gymnarion wittei E. Binder, 1979

Species brought into synonymy

- Gymnarion (Lacrimarion) lacrimosus Connolly, 1929 : synonym of Lacrimarion lacrimosus (Connolly, 1929) (superseded combination)
- Gymnarion aloysii-sabaudiae (Pollonera, 1906) : synonym of Gymnarion aloysiisabaudiae (Pollonera, 1906) (incorrect original spelling)
- Gymnarion lacrimosus Connolly, 1929 : synonym of Lacrimarion lacrimosus (Connolly, 1929) (original combination)
