= Leptichnus =

Scientific classification
- Kingdom: Animalia
- Phylum: Mollusca
- Class: Gastropoda
- Order: Stylommatophora
- Family: Urocyclidae
- Genus: Leptichnus; Simroth, 1896

Genus of gastropods

Leptichnus is a genus of air-breathing land snails or semi-slugs, terrestrial pulmonate gastropod mollusks in the family Urocyclidae.

Leptichnus is the type genus of the tribe Leptichnini.

== Species ==
Species within the genus Leptichnus include:

- Leptichnus bernardi van Goethem
