= Elisolimax =

Scientific classification
- Kingdom: Animalia
- Phylum: Mollusca
- Class: Gastropoda
- Order: Stylommatophora
- Family: Urocyclidae
- Genus: Elisolimax; Cockerell, 1893

Genus of gastropods

Elisolimax is a genus of terrestrial slugs in the family Urocyclidae. They occur in Sub-Saharan Africa including Madagascar.

== Species ==
There are 11 accepted species within the genus Elisolimax:

- Elisolimax bella (Heynemann, 1883)
- Elisolimax bussei (Simroth, 1910)
- Elisolimax comorensis (P. Fischer, 1883)
- Elisolimax ehlersi (Simroth, 1905)
- Elisolimax flavescens (W. Keferstein, 1866)
- Elisolimax grillensis (Simroth, 1910)
- Elisolimax madagascariensis (Poirier, 1887)
- Elisolimax morotzensis (Simroth, 1910)
- Elisolimax riparius (Simroth, 1910)
- Elisolimax rufescens (Simroth, 1894)
- Elisolimax variabilis (Verdcourt, 1960)
