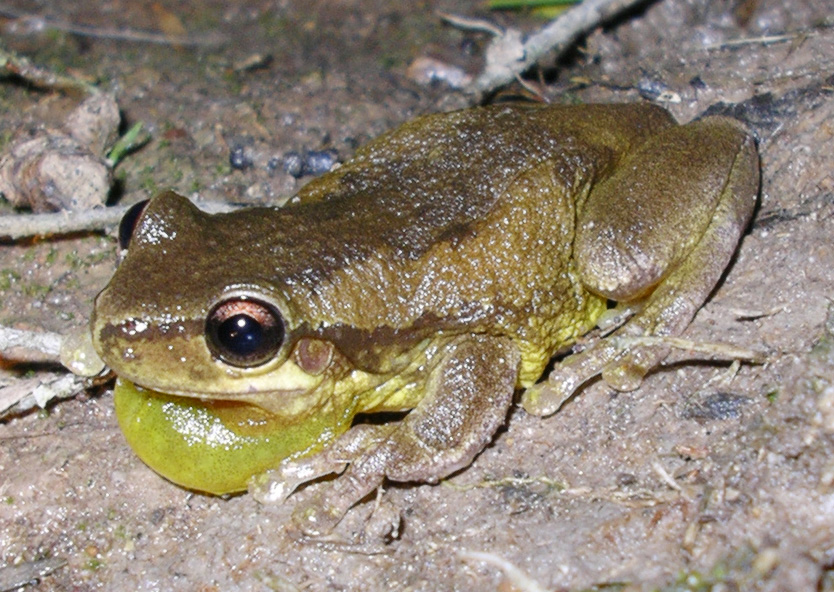

Scientific classification
- Kingdom: Animalia
- Phylum: Chordata
- Class: Amphibia
- Order: Anura
- Family: Pelodryadidae
- Genus: Colleeneremia
- Species: C. quiritatus

Binomial name
- Colleeneremia quiritatus Donnellan et al., 2025

= Screaming tree frog =

Species of frog

The screaming tree frog (Colleeneremia quiritatus) is a species of frog in the subfamily Pelodryadinae. It is endemic to southeastern Australia, east of the Great Dividing Range. It ranges from northeastern Victoria to the mid-coast of New South Wales, from Mallacoota north to Taree. This species is the "bleating tree frog" that occurs around Sydney, and is well known for its very loud call.

This species was long confused with the robust bleating tree frog (Colleeneremia dentata), and was thus only described in 2021 despite being a relatively common species found near major population centers. Rowley et al (2021) distinguished three distinct clades in what was formerly considered a single species (Colleeneremia dentata), based on genetic divergence, slight morphological differences, and notable differences in vocalizations; the latter were collected via the FrogID Australia citizen science project. One of these was the robust bleating tree frog (C. dentata sensu stricto), another was the slender bleating tree frog (C. balatus), and last was the screaming tree frog (C. quiritatus). The screaming tree frog has the longest call out of the three species, lacks a white line along its side, and the male turns yellow during breeding season. The vocal sac of male screaming tree frogs is always yellow, while the rest of the frog is only yellow during breeding season. The three species have different geographical ranges, and the screaming tree frog has the southernmost range.
