= Bleating tree frog =

The bleating tree frog of Australia has been split into three distinct species:

- Screaming tree frog (Litoria quiritatus), from northeastern Victoria to mid-coast New South Wales
- Robust bleating tree frog (Litoria dentata sensu stricto), from northeastern New South Wales to the NSW/Queensland border
- Slender bleating tree frog (Litoria balatus) from southeastern Queensland
