= Urocyclus =

Scientific classification
- Kingdom: Animalia
- Phylum: Mollusca
- Class: Gastropoda
- Order: Stylommatophora
- Family: Urocyclidae
- Subfamily: Urocyclinae
- Tribe: Urocyclini
- Genus: Urocyclus; Gray, 1864

Genus of gastropods

Urocyclus is a genus of air-breathing land slugs, terrestrial gastropod mollusks in the family Urocyclidae.

Urocyclus is the type genus of the family Urocyclidae.

== Species ==
Species within the genus Urocyclus include:

- Urocyclus acuminatus Poirier, 1887
- Urocyclus auratus Dupouy, 1966
- Urocyclus comorensis Fischer, 1882
- Urocyclus grillensis Simroth, 1910
- Urocyclus kirkii Gray, 1864
- Urocyclus longicauda Fischer, 1882
- Urocyclus madagascariensis Poirier, 1887
- Urocyclus morotzensis Simroth, 1910
- Urocyclus pinguis Robson, 1914
- Urocyclus riparius Simroth, 1910
- Urocyclus vittatus Fischer, 1882

Subgenera:

- Urocyclina Dupouy, 1966
- Kirkia Pollonera, 1909
- Urocyclus Gray, 1864
