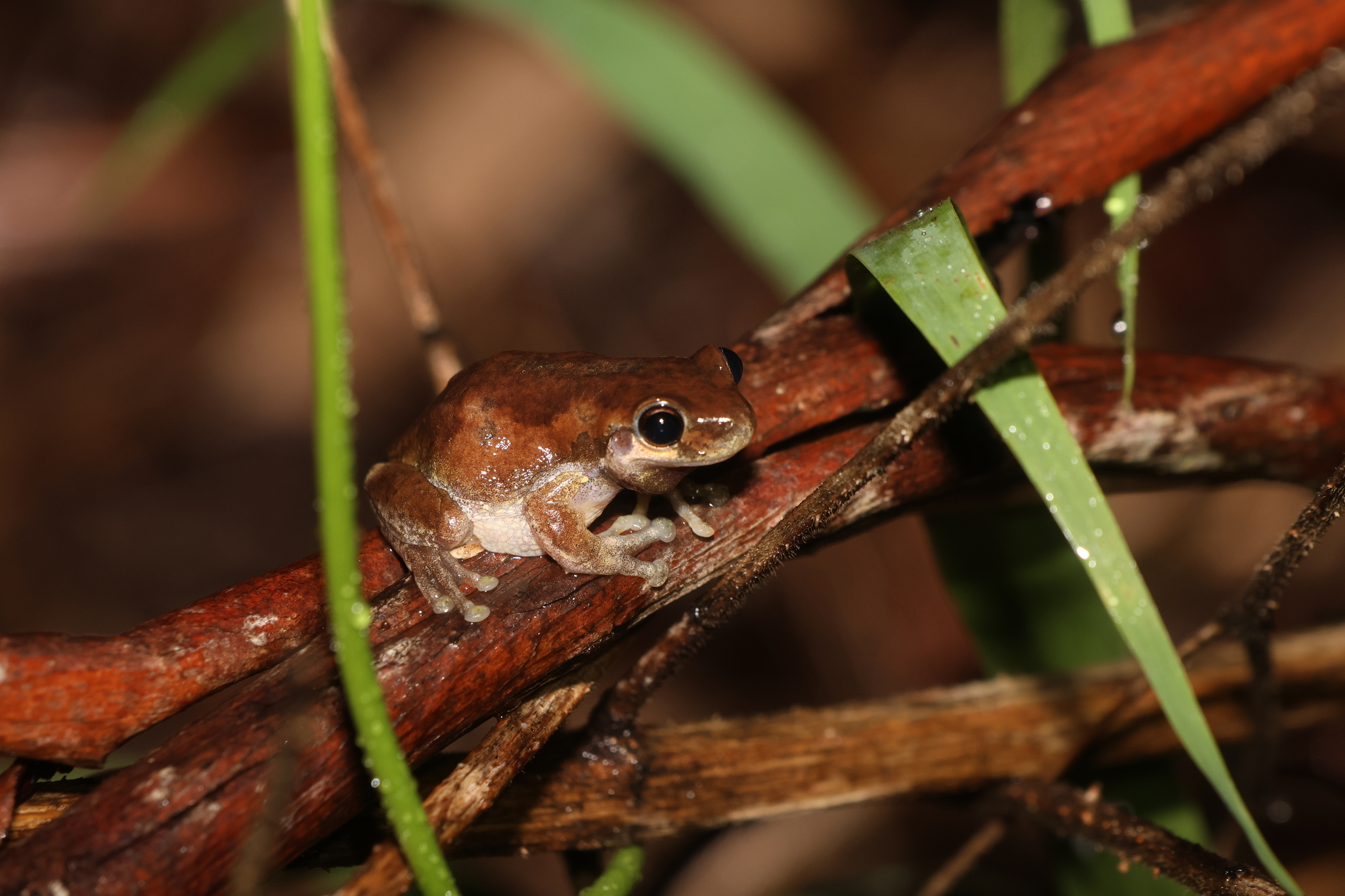

Scientific classification
- Kingdom: Animalia
- Phylum: Chordata
- Class: Amphibia
- Order: Anura
- Family: Pelodryadidae
- Genus: Colleeneremia
- Species: C. balatus

Binomial name
- Colleeneremia balatus Rowley, Mahony, Hines, Myers, Price, Shea, & Donnellan, 2021

= Slender bleating tree frog =

Species of frog

The slender bleating tree frog (Colleeneremia balatus), is a frog in the family Hylidae. It is endemic to Australia, where it is found throughout Southeast Queensland south from around Maryborough and extending west to the Bunya Mountains and Stanthorpe and south into northeastern NSW. This is the "bleating tree frog" that occurs around Brisbane.

It was long confused with the robust bleating tree frog (C. dentata) and was thus only described as a distinct species in 2021. Rowley et al (2021) distinguished three distinct clades in what was formerly considered a single species (Colleeneremia dentata), based on genetic divergence, slight morphological differences, and notable differences in vocalizations; the latter were collected via the FrogID Australia citizen science project. One of these was the robust bleating tree frog (C. dentata sensu stricto), another was the slender bleating tree frog (C. balatus), and last was the screaming tree frog (C. quiritatus). The slender bleating tree frog has the shortest call out of the three species, has a more slender build than the other two, a white line extending down its side, and males have a distinctly black vocal sac during breeding season.
