= Atrichotoxon =

Scientific classification
- Kingdom: Animalia
- Phylum: Mollusca
- Class: Gastropoda
- Order: Stylommatophora
- Family: Helicarionidae
- Genus: Atrichotoxon; Simroth, 1910

Genus of gastropods

Atrichotoxon is a genus of air-breathing land snails, terrestrial pulmonate gastropod mollusks in the family Helicarionidae. They are endemic to East Usambara and Pare Mountains of Tanzania. The Genus was formed in 1910 by renowned malacologist Heinrich Simroth Atrichotoxon is Greek for "without a hairy dart" as these snails are classified by their unique dart sacks. A. punctatum is described as having no darts or dart stumps within its dart sac. The original specimen found by Simroth of A. punctatum has been lost and no others have been identified since. The validity of A. punctatum is potentially dubious. Atrichotoxon usambarense was described in 1961 by Bernard Verdcourt

== Species ==
Species within the genus Atrichotoxon include:

- Atrichotoxon punctatum
- Atrichotoxon usambarense
