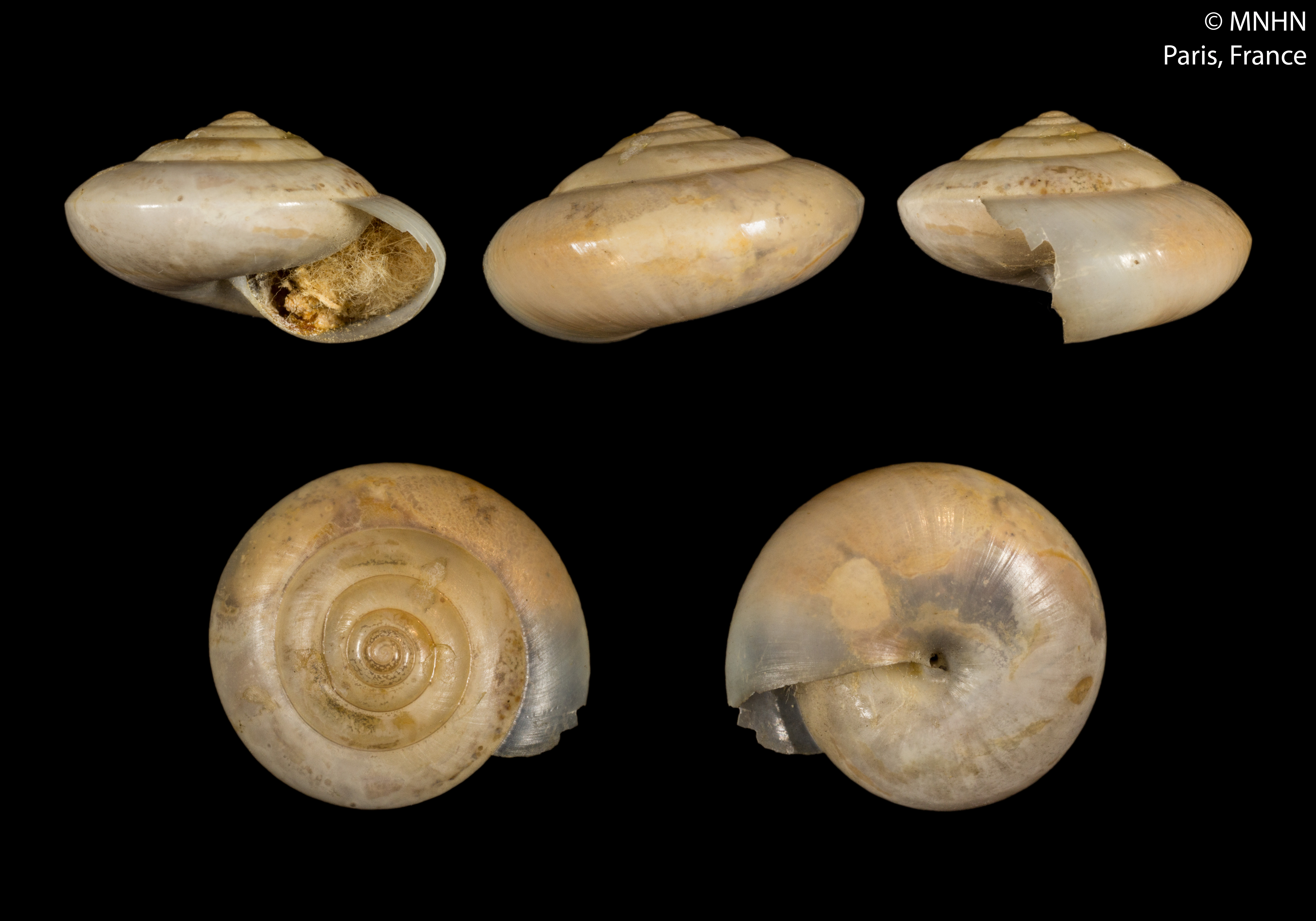
- Shell of Thapsia troglodytes (syntype at MNHN? Paris)

Scientific classification
- Kingdom: Animalia
- Phylum: Mollusca
- Class: Gastropoda
- Order: Stylommatophora
- Infraorder: Limacoidei
- Superfamily: Helicarionoidea
- Family: Urocyclidae
- Genus: Thapsia; Albers, 1860

Type species
- Helix troglodytes Morelet, 1848

Synonyms
- Gudeella Preston, 1913 (junior synonym); Megathapsia Raemaekers, 1959; Nanina (Thapsia) E. von Martens, 1860 (superseded rank); Tapsia [sic] (misspelling); Thapsia (Gudeella) Preston, 1913 · unaccepted (junior synonym); Thapsiella Gude, 1911 (junior primary homonym of...); Thapsinella Raemaekers, 1959 ·

= Thapsia (gastropod) =

Genus of gastropods

Thapsia is a genus of air-breathing land snails, terrestrial pulmonate gastropod molluscs in the subfamily Sheldoniinae of the family Urocyclidae.

== Distribution ==
Species in this genus are found in tropical western Africa, from Senegal to Gabon.

== Description ==
Species attributed to the genus Thapsia sensu lato have shell diameters ranging from about 15 to 30 mm, with 5½-6½ whorls. These rather featureless dextral shells are characterized by a low spire and their yellow to brown color. The spiral sculpture of the postembryonic shell is slender. In some larger * The sculpture of the radial ribs is formed crosswise (like the letter X) or beadlike. The foot shows a long caudal horn.

== Species ==
Thapsia was originally designated in 1860 by German zoologist Johann Christian Albers as a subgenus of Nanina Gray, 1834, non Risso, 1826.

This genus is a heterogeneous assemblage. Because the shell characters of this genus converge with those of the larger specimens of some closely related genera (Saphtia Winter, 2008, Pseudosaphtia Winter, 2008 and Vanmolia Winter, 2008), the delimitation of * To Thapsia s.l. is difficult. There very few papers that describe the anatomical features of this genus.

Thapsia contains the following species:

- Thapsia abyssinica (Jickeli, 1873)
- Thapsia aranea (Preston, 1914)
- Thapsia bartaensis (Preston, 1914)
- Thapsia buchholzi Bourguignat, 1885
- Thapsia buraensis Verdcourt, 1982
- Thapsia cavernicola d'Ailly, 1910
- Thapsia cinnamomeozonata Pilsbry, 1919
- Thapsia columellaris(L. Pfeiffer, 1849)
- Thapsia consobrina (Preston, 1914)
- Thapsia consueta (Preston, 1914)
- Thapsia conuloidea Preston, 1911
- Thapsia curvatula E. von Martens, 1897
- Thapsia decepta E. A. Smith, 1899
- Thapsia densesculpta (Preston, 1914)
- Thapsia depressior (E. A. Smith, 1890)
- Thapsia ebimimbangana Winter, 2008
- Thapsia elgonensis (Preston, 1914)
- Thapsia eminiana (E. A. Smith, 1890)
- Thapsia eremias (Melvill & Ponsonby, 1896)
- Thapsia eucosmia Pilsbry, 1919
- Thapsia exasperata Preston, 1910
- Thapsia gereti Preston, 1910
- Thapsia glomus (E. von Martens, 1860)
- Thapsia grandis Verdcourt, 1982
- Thapsia hanningtoni (Smith, 1890)
- Thapsia inclinans (Preston, 1914)
- Thapsia indecorata (Gould, 1850)
- Thapsia inflata (Preston, 1914)
- Thapsia innocens Preston, 1910
- Thapsia insimulans E. A. Smith, 1899
- Thapsia insulsa Preston, 1910
- Thapsia iridescens (Preston, 1914)
- Thapsia kampalaensis (Preston, 1914)
- Thapsia karamwegasensis Germain, 1923
- Thapsia kibonotoensis d'Ailly, 1910
- Thapsia kigeziensis (Preston, 1913)
- Thapsia lasti (E. A. Smith, 1890)
- Thapsia leroyi Grandidier, 1887
- Thapsia magna Thiele, 1933
- Thapsia majendooensis (Connolly, 1928)
- Thapsia marsabitensis (Preston, 1914)
- Thapsia masakaensis (Preston, 1914)
- Thapsia masukuensis E. A. Smith, 1899
- Thapsia microleuca Verdcourt, 1982
- Thapsia microsculpta Verdcourt, 1982
- Thapsia millestriata (Preston, 1912)
- Thapsia mime (Preston, 1914)
- Thapsia mukandaensis (Preston, 1914)
- Thapsia mukulensis Pilsbry, 1919
- Thapsia multistriata (Preston, 1914)
- Thapsia nemorum (Preston, 1914)
- Thapsia nyikana E. A. Smith, 1899
- Thapsia oleosa (L. Pfeiffer, 1850)
- Thapsia oscitans Connolly, 1925
- Thapsia pallidior (Preston, 1914)
- Thapsia paucispirata Thiele, 1933
- Thapsia pinguis (Krauss, 1848)
- Thapsia pompholyx Pilsbry, 1919
- Thapsia punctata Thiele, 1933
- Thapsia radiata d'Ailly, 1910
- Thapsia rosenbergi Preston, 1909
- Thapsia rufescens Pilsbry, 1919
- Thapsia rufocincta (Connolly, 1941)
- Thapsia rutshuruensis Pilsbry, 1919
- † Thapsia senutae Pickford, 2019
- Thapsia silvaepluviosae d'Ailly, 1910
- Thapsia simulata E. A. Smith, 1899
- Thapsia snelli Connolly, 1925
- Thapsia stanleyvillensis Pilsbry, 1919
- Thapsia submixta Germain, 1935
- Thapsia tribulationis (Preston, 1914)
- Thapsia tricolor (Connolly, 1925)
- Thapsia troglodytes (Morelet, 1848) - the type species, originally described as Helix troglodytes Morelet, 1848
- Thapsia uluguruensis Verdcourt, 1982
- Thapsia unguinosa Pollonera, 1898
- Thapsia urguessensis (Preston, 1914)
- Thapsia usambarensis Verdcourt, 1982
- Thapsia usitata (Preston, 1914)
- Thapsia vernhouti (Preston, 1913)
- Thapsia vestii (Jickeli, 1873)
- Thapsia wieringai de Winter, 2008
- Thapsia woodhousei (Preston, 1914)
- Thapsia yalaensis Germain, 1923
- Thapsia zambiensis Pilsbry, 1919

== Synonyms ==
- Thapsia calamechroa (Jonas, 1843): synonym of Saphtia calamechroa (Jonas, 1843) (superseded combination)
- Thapsia calamichroa (Jonas, 1843): synonym of Saphtia calamechroa (Jonas, 1843) (invalid; incorrect subsequent spelling)
- Thapsia chrysosticta (Morelet, 1867): synonym of Apothapsia thomensis (Dohrn, 1866)
- Thapsia euriomphala Bourguignat, 1883: synonym of Thapsia abyssinica (Jickeli, 1873)
- Thapsia germaini Connolly, 1925: synonym of Apothapsia thomensis (Dohrn, 1866)
- Thapsia gerstenbrandti (Preston, 1914): synonym of Thapsia elgonensis (Preston, 1914) (junior synonym)
- Thapsia mixta E. A. Smith, 1899: synonym of Thapsia pinguis (Krauss, 1848)
- Thapsia rumrutiensis Preston, 1911: synonym of Afroguppya rumrutiensis (Preston, 1911) (original combination)
- Thapsia sjoestedti d'Ailly, 1896: synonym of Vanmolia sjoestedti (d'Ailly, 1896) (original combination)
- Thapsia thomensis (Dohrn, 1866): synonym of Apothapsia thomensis (Dohrn, 1866)
