= Wilhelm Moritz Keferstein =

German naturalist (1833–1870)

Wilhelm Moritz Keferstein (7 June 1833, Winsen (Luhe) – 25 January 1870) was a German naturalist. He described a number of reptiles and amphibians for the first time.

He originally studied hydraulic engineering in Hanover, later becoming a lecturer and professor of zoology at the University of Göttingen.

With zoologist Ernst Ehlers (1835-1925), he wrote Zoologische Beiträge gesammelt im Winter 1859/60 in Neapel und Messina... in 1861. With Karl Wilhelm von Kupffer (1829-1902) he was co-author of a study on the electric organs of Gymnotus and Mormyrus that was published in Henle and Pfeufer's Zeitschrift für rationelle Medicin (Journal of rational medicine). He also made important contributions to Heinrich Georg Bronn's Die Klassen und Ordnungen des Thier-Reichs (Classes and Orders of the Animal Kingdom).

Keferstein's tree frog is named after him (a species he described in 1868), as is a genus of polychaetes, Kefersteinia (family Hesionidae).

== See also ==
- Category:Taxa named by Wilhelm Moritz Keferstein
