= Empoasca flavescens =

Scientific classification
- Kingdom: Animalia
- Phylum: Arthropoda
- Class: Insecta
- Order: Hemiptera
- Suborder: Auchenorrhyncha
- Family: Cicadellidae
- Genus: Empoasca
- Species: E. flavescens

Binomial name
- Empoasca flavescens (Fabricius, 1794)

Synonyms
- Cicada flavescens

Species of true bug

Empoasca flavescens is a species of true bug in the family Cicadellidae. It is a pest of millets such as sorghum in Asia.
