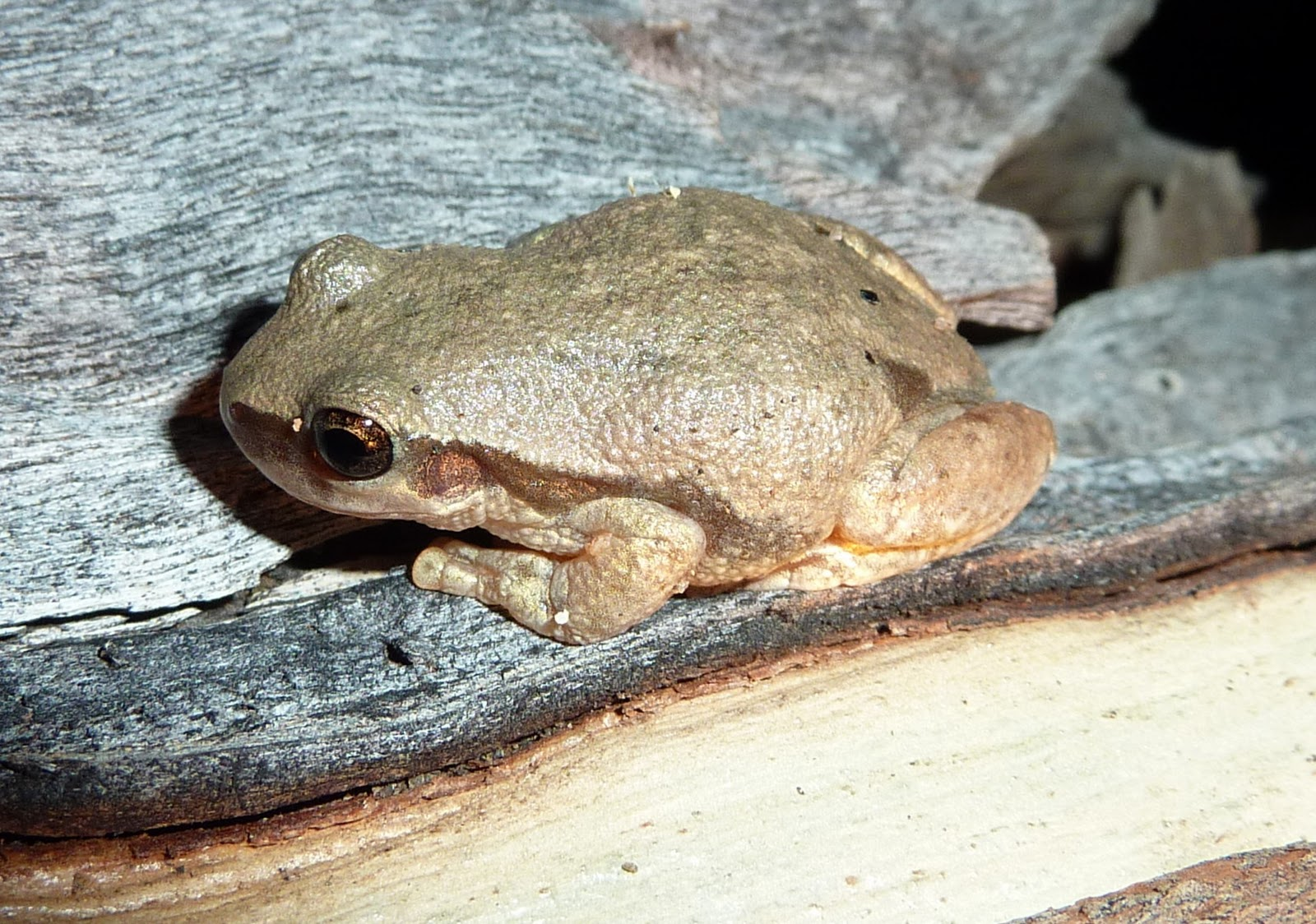

Conservation status
- Least Concern (IUCN 3.1)

Scientific classification
- Kingdom: Animalia
- Phylum: Chordata
- Class: Amphibia
- Order: Anura
- Family: Pelodryadidae
- Genus: Colleeneremia
- Species: C. rubella

Binomial name
- Colleeneremia rubella Gray, 1842
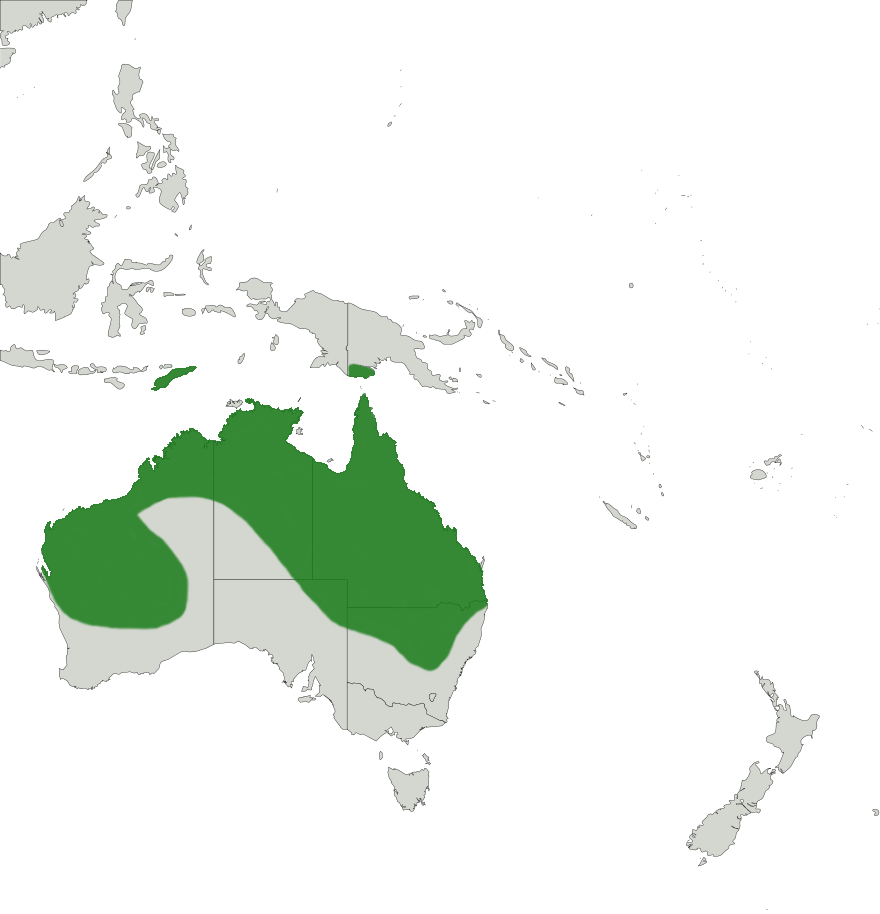
- Desert tree frog distribution

= Desert tree frog =

Species of amphibian

The desert tree frog (Colleeneremia rubella), or little red tree frog, is a species of tree frog native to Australia, southern New Guinea, and Timor. It is one of Australia's most widely distributed frogs, inhabiting northern Australia, including desert regions and much of temperate eastern Australia. It is one of the few Australian tree frogs to inhabit arid, tropical, and temperate climates.

== Description ==
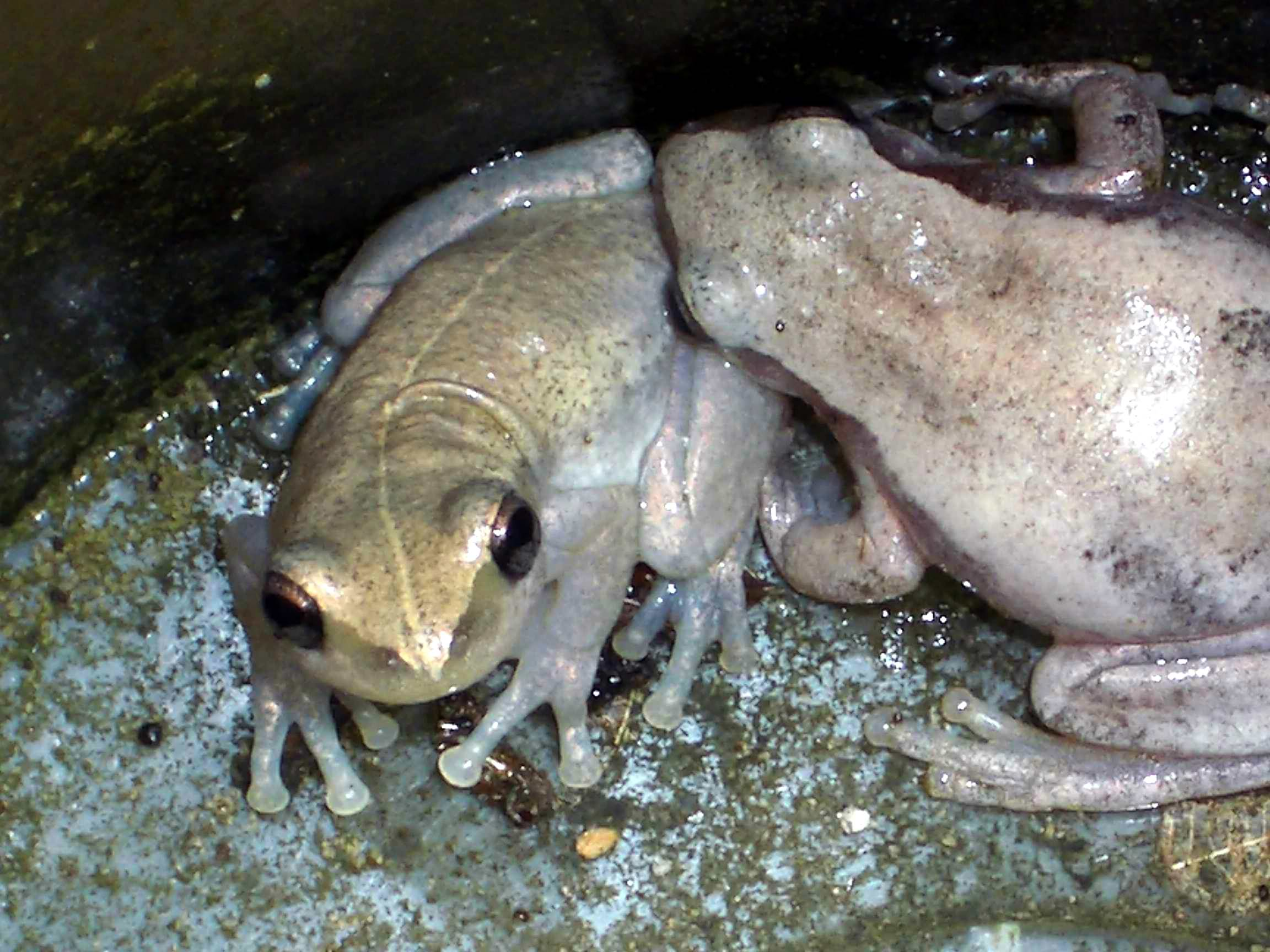
Desert tree frogs in a rain gauge

It is rotund, with a small, flat head. It has short arms and strong, short legs. Adults are 28–43 mm (1.1–1.7 in) in snout-vent length. Its ventral surface is white, and the dorsal surface ranges from light grey to dark red and has small black flecks. Adult specimens from Cooktown, Queensland, often show a pronounced metallic sheen on the dorsal surface, ranging in colour from bronze to gold. A dark band runs from the snout, across the eye, and along the flanks of the frog. The throats of males in breeding season are a dark grey colour. The groin is lemon-yellow, and the tympanum is visible. Baby frogs have an almost transparent abdomen, allowing a clear view of their abdominal organs.

== Ecology and behaviour ==
The wide distribution and the large range of habitats it inhabits create a large variation in breeding habits. Populations that live in temperate or tropical zones breed annually during the wet season or summer. However, the populations in desert regions will breed whenever rain occurs. Tadpole development is dependent on the temperature of the water. Small amounts of water heat to higher temperatures, which triggers the tadpoles to develop faster; some develop in just 14 days.

Unlike most desert frogs, it does not burrow to avoid heat and desiccation. It will seek out shelter under rocks, trees, or leaf litter. They are commonly found around human dwellings where water is available and can be found in sinks, toilets or drain pipes. Compared to other desert frogs of a similar size, they have a relatively low rate of evaporative water loss, and do not dry out as quickly as expected under hot and dry conditions. Their low rate of evaporative water loss can partly be attributed to adopting a water-conserving posture, where frogs tuck their limbs close to their body and close off ventral skin from the outside environment. One study found that frog species like desert tree frogs that use water-conserving postures tended to have a higher resistance to evaporative water loss. Desert tree frogs can also change their color from dark brown to bright white, which serves to increase solar reflectance off the skin and decreases their heat intake, and, unlike most amphibians, when exposed to dry air they will change color regardless of previous background color.
