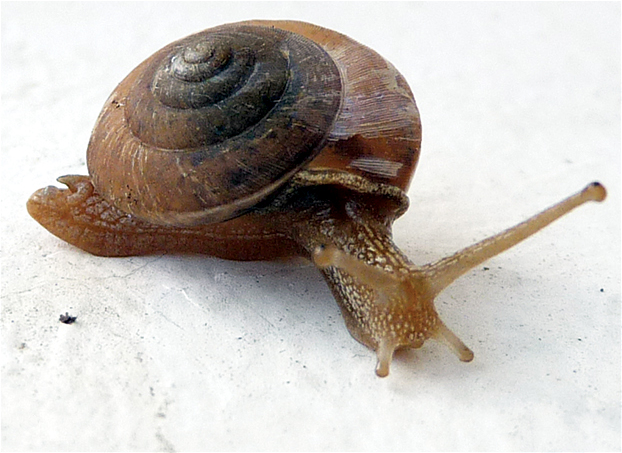
- Trochonanina mozambicensis

Scientific classification
- Kingdom: Animalia
- Phylum: Mollusca
- Class: Gastropoda
- Order: Stylommatophora
- Suborder: Helicina
- Infraorder: Limacoidei
- Superfamily: Helicarionoidea
- Family: Urocyclidae; Simroth, 1889

= Urocyclidae =

Family of gastropods

Urocyclidae is a family of air-breathing land snails, semi-slugs and land slugs, terrestrial pulmonate gastropod mollusks in the superfamily Helicarionoidea.

Some species within this family make and use love darts before mating.

== Distribution ==
The Urocyclidae are distributed in the Afrotropical realm, including Madagascar, the Comores and the islands of the Gulf of Guinea.

== Taxonomy ==
The family Urocyclidae consists of 3 subfamilies:

- subfamily Rhysotininae Schileyko, 2002
- subfamily Sheldoniinae Connolly, 1925 (1912) - synonyms: Peltatinae Godwin-Austen, 1912; Trochonanininae Connolly, 1912; Trochozonitinae Iredale, 1914; Ledoulxiinae Pilsbry, 1919; Gymnarionidae Von Mol, 1970; Rhysotinidae Schileyko, 2002; Zonitarionini Schileyko, 2002; Acantharionini Schileyko, 2002
- subfamily Urocyclinae Simroth, 1889
  - tribe Urocyclini Simroth, 1889 - synonyms: Atoxonini Schileyko, 2002; Buettneriini Schileyko, 2002
  - tribe Dendrolimacini Van Goethem, 1977
  - tribe Leptichnini Van Goethem, 1977
  - tribe Upembellini Van Goethem, 1977

=== Genera ===
The following genera are recognised in the family Urocyclidae:

unsorted

- † Koruella Pickford, 2009

Subfamily Rhysotininae

- Rhysotina Ancey, 1887

Subfamily Sheldoniinae

- Acantharion Binder & Tillier, 1985
- Africarion Godwin-Austen, 1883
- Amatarion Van Mol, 1970
- Angustivestis Pilsbry, 1919
- Aspidelus Morelet, 1884
- Aspidotomium Degner, 1932
- Belonarion Pilsbry, 1919
- Bloyetia Bourguignat, 1890
- Camerunarion Van Mol, 1970
- Carinazingis van Bruggen & de Winter, 1990
- Centrafricarion Van Mol, 1970
- Chlamydarion Van Mol, 1968
- Colparion Laidlaw, 1938
- Degneria Verdcourt, 1956
- Entagaricus Pilsbry, 1919
- Estria Poirier, 1887
- Falloonella Preston, 1914
- Fuellebornia Verdcourt, 1998
- Granularion Germain, 1912
- Gymnarion Pilsbry, 1919
- †Hamya Bourguignat, 1885
- Kerkophorus Godwin-Austen, 1912
- Lacrimarion Connolly, 1939
- Malagarion Tillier, 1979
- Mesafricarion Pilsbry, 1919
- Microkerkus Godwin-Austen, 1912
- Montanobloyetia Verdcourt, 1961
- Morrumbalia Verdcourt, 1998
- Paragranularion Van Mol, 1970
- Percivalia Preston, 1914
- Plicatonanina Verdcourt, 1961
- Principicochlea D. Holyoak & G. Holyoak, 2020
- Principitrochoidea D. Holyoak & G. Holyoak, 2020
- Ptilototheca Herbert, 2016
- Rhopalogonium Degner, 1932
- Selatodryas Herbert, 2017
- Senegalarion Van Mol, 1970
- Sheldonia Ancey, 1887 - the type genus of the subfamily Sheldoniinae
- Sjostedtina Verdcourt, 1961
- Sylvarion Van Mol, 1970
- Thapsia Albers, 1860
- Thielarion Van Mol, 1970
- Thomithapsia D. Holyoak & G. Holyoak, 2020
- Thomitrochoidea D. Holyoak & G. Holyoak, 2020
- Tresia Van Goethem, 1975
- Trochonanina Mousson, 1869
- Trochozonites Pfeffer, 1883
- Tropidocochlion Verdcourt, 1998
- Verdcourtia Van Mol, 1970
- Verrucarion Van Mol, 1970
- Zingis E. von Martens, 1878
- Zonitarion Pfeffer, 1883

Subfamily Urocyclinae

Tribe Dendrolimacini

- Dendrolimax Heynemann, 1868 - the type genus of the tribe Dendrolimacini

Tribe Leptichnini

- Leptichnus Simroth, 1896 - the type genus of the tribe Leptichnini

Tribe Upembellini

- Leptichnoides Van Goethem, 1975
- Upembella Van Goethem, 1969 - the type genus of the tribe Upembellini

tribe Urocyclini

- Anisotoxon Van Goethem, 1975
- Atoxon Simroth, 1888
- Atoxonoides Van Goethem, 1973
- Atrichotoxon Simroth, 1910
- Buettneria Simroth, 1910
- Bukobia Simroth, 1896
- Elisolimax Cockerell, 1893
- Emphysetes Verdcourt, 2003
- Microcyclus Simroth, 1896
- Nupnus Van Goethem, 1975
- Pembatoxon Van Goethem, 1975
- Phaneroporus Simroth, 1888
- Polytoxon Simroth, 1897
- Pseudatoxon Van Goethem, 1975
- Tanzalimax Rowson, Paustian & Van Goethem, 2017
- Trichotoxon Simroth, 1888
- Udzungwalimax Rowson, Paustian & Van Goethem, 2017
- Urocyclus Gray, 1864 - the type genus of the family Urocyclidae

== Cladogram ==
The following cladogram shows the phylogenic relationship of this family to other families in the limacoid clade:

- limacoid clade
  - Staffordioidea
    Staffordiidae
  - - - Dyakioidea
        Dyakiidae
      - Gastrodontoidea
        - Pristilomatidae
        - - Chronidae
          - - Euconulidae
            - Trochomorphidae
          - - Gastrodontidae
            - Oxychilidae
    - - Parmacelloidea
        - Trigonochlamydidae
        - Parmacellidae
        - Milacidae
      - - - Zonitoidea
            Zonitidae
          - Helicarionoidea
            - Helicarionidae
            - - Ariophantidae
              - Urocyclidae
        - Limacoidea
          - Vitrinidae
          - - Boettgerillidae
            - - Limacidae
              - Agriolimacidae
