= List of non-marine molluscs of Colombia =

Location of Colombia

The non-marine molluscs of Colombia are a part of the molluscan fauna of Colombia.

There are 559 species of non-marine molluscs living in the wild in Colombia.

There are a total of ??? species of gastropods, which breaks down to ?? species of freshwater gastropods, and ??? species of land gastropods in 82 genera, plus ?? species of bivalves living in the wild.

There are 20 non-indigenous species of gastropods (? freshwater and 20 land species: 13 snails and 7 slugs) and ? species of bivalves in the wild in Colombia. This is a total of ? freshwater non-indigenous species of wild molluscs.

The non-marine mollusc fauna of Colombia is not fully surveyed yet. There are still 6 departments of Colombia, especially in the southwest, from which there are no records of land gastropods yet (as of 2008).

Summary table of number of species

	Colombia
freshwater gastropods	??
land gastropods	??? (82 genera)
gastropods altogether	???
bivalves	??
molluscs altogether	559
non-indigenous gastropods in the wild	? freshwater and 20 land
non-indigenous synantrop gastropods	?
non-indigenous bivalves in the wild	?
non-indigenous synantrop bivalves	?
non-indigenous molluscs altogether	20

== Freshwater gastropods ==
Ampullariidae

- Marisa Gray, [1824]
- Pomacea Perry, 1811

== Land gastropods ==
There are 80 genera (79 genera in this list) of land gastropods in (continental) Colombia.

Helicinidae

- Alcadia (Microalcadia) - 4 species in Colombia
- Alcadia novogranadensis Hausdorf, 2006

Cyclophoridae Gray, 1847

- Cyclotus Swainson, 1840
- Calacyclotus Bartsch, 1942
- Filocyclus Bartsch, 1942

Neocyclotidae Kobelt & Möllendorff, 1897

- Aperostoma Troschel, 1847
- Buckleyia Higgins, 1872
- Calaperostoma Pilsbry, H. A., [1935]
- Poteria Gray, 1850
- Neocyclotus Fischer & Crosse H., 1886

Arionidae Gray, 1840

- Arion Férussac, 1819
  - Arion intermedius Normand, 1852 - introduced

Veronicellidae

- Sarasinula marginata (Semper, 1885)

Philomycidae Gray, 1847

- Philomycus Rafinesque, 1820

Scolodontidae Baker, [1925] (include Systrophiidae Thiele, 1926)

- Hirtudiscus Hylton-Scott, 1973
  - Hirtudiscus boyacensis Hausdorf, 2003
  - Hirtudiscus comatus Hausdorf, 2003
  - Hirtudiscus curei Hausdorf, 2003
  - Hirtudiscus hirtus Hylton Scott, 1973
- Systrophia Pfeiffer, 1855
- Guestieria Crosse H., 1872
- Happia Bourguignat, 1889
- Miradiscops Baker, [1925]

Camaenidae Pilsbry, H. A., 1895

- Isomeria Albers, 1850

Pleurodontidae

- Labyrinthus Beck, 1837
- Pleurodonte Fischer von Waldheim, 1807
- Solaropsis Beck, 1837

Helicidae Rafinesque, 1815

- Helix L., 1758
  - Cornu aspersum (O. F. Müller, 1774) - introduced (not counted as genus in this list)

Xanthonychidae Strebel & Pfeiffer, 1879

- Leptarionta Crosse H. & Fischer, 1872

Euconulidae Baker, 1928

- Habroconus Fischer & Crosse H., 1872

Agriolimacidae Wagner, 1935

- Deroceras Rafinesque, 1820
  - Deroceras laeve (O. F. Müller, 1774) - introduced
  - Deroceras panormitanum (Lessona & Pollonera, 1882) - introduced
  - Deroceras reticulatum (O. F. Müller, 1774) - introduced

Boettgerillidae Van Goethem, 1972

- Boettgerilla Simroth, 1910
  - Boettgerilla pallens Simroth, 1912 - introduced

Limacidae Rafinesque, 1815

- Lehmannia Heynemann, 1863
  - Lehmannia valentiana (A. Férussac, 1822) - introduced
- Limax L., 1758

Polygyridae Pilsbry, H. A., 1894

- Giffordius Pilsbry, H. A., 1930

Thysanophoridae Pilsbry, H. A., 1926

- Thysanophora Strebel & Pfeffer, 1880

Sagdidae Pilsbry, H. A., 1895

- Lacteoluna Pilsbry, H. A., 1926

Succineidae Beck, 1837

- Succinea Draparnaud, 1805
- Omalonyx Orbigny, 1841

Milacidae Ellis, 1926

- Milax Gray, 1855
  - Milax gagates (Draparnaud, 1801) - introduced

Pristilomatidae

- Hawaiia minuscula (Binney, 1840) - introduced

Vitrinidae Fitzinger, 1833

- Hawaiia Gude, 1911
- Oxychilus Fitzinger, 1833
  - Oxychilus alliarius (Miller, 1822) - introduced
- Vitrea Fitzinger, 1833
  - Vitrea contracta (Westerlund, 1871) - introduced

Zonitidae Mörch, 1864

- Hyalinia Agassiz, 1837

Achatinidae Swainson, 1840

- Achatina Lamarck, 1799

Ferussaciidae

- Cecilioides Ferussac, 1814

Subulinidae Crosse H. & Fischer, 1877

- Subulina Beck, 1837
- Leptinaria Beck, 1837
- Opeas Albers, 1850
- Obeliscos Beck, 1837
- Rhodea barcrofti Pilsbry, 1958
- Rhodea gigantea Mousson, 1873
- Rhodea mariaalejandrae ..., 2007
- Rhodea moussoni ..., 2007
- Synapterpes Pilsbry, H. A., 1896

Orthalicidae

- Bulimulus Leach, 1814
- Simpulopsis Beck, 1837
- Thaumastus Albers, 1860
- Naesiotus Albers, 1850
- Drymaeus Albers, 1850
- Auris Spix, 1827
- Dryptus Albers, 1860
- Stenostylus Pilsbry, H. A., 1898
- Plekocheilus Guilding, 1828
- Orthalicus Beck, 1837
- Corona Albers, 1850
- Hemibulimus Martens, E. von., 1885
- Porphyrobaphe Shuttleworth, 1856
- Sultana Shuttleworth, 1856

Cerionidae Pilsbry, H. A., 1901

- Cerion Röding, 1798

Urocoptidae Pilsbry, 1898 (1868)

- Microceramus Pilsbry, H. A. & Vanatta, 1898

Clausiliidae Mörch, 1864

- Clausilia Draparnaud, 1805
- Nenia Adams, H. & Adams, 1855
- Columbinia Polinski, 1924

Spiraxidae Baker, 1939

- Euglandina Fischer & Crosse H., 1870
- Pseudosubulina Strebel & Pfeffer, 1882

Charopidae Hutton, [1884]

- Radiodiscus Pilsbry, H. A. & Ferris, [1906]
- Lilloiconcha Weyrauch, 1965
  - Lilloiconcha gordurasensis (Thiele, 1927)
  - Lilloiconcha costulata Hausdorf, 2005
  - Lilloiconcha laevigata Hausdorf, 2005

Punctidae Morse, 1864

- Paralaoma Iredale, [1913]
- Paralaoma servilis (Shuttleworth, 1852) - introduced

Streptaxidae Gray, 1806

- Hypselartemon Wenz, 1947
- Streptaxis Gray, 1837
- Streptostele Dohrn, 1866

Strophocheilidae Thiele, 1926

- Strophocheilus Spix, 1827
- Megalobulimus Miller, 1878

Pupillidae Turton, 1831

- Pupoides Pfeiffer, [1854]

Vertiginidae Fitzinger, 1833

- Gastrocopta Wollaston, 1878
- Vertigo Müller, 1774
- Pupisoma Stoliczka, 1873

Strobilopsidae Pilsbry, H. A., 1893

- Strobilops Pilsbry, H. A., 1893

Valloniidae Morse, 1864

- Vallonia Risso, 1826

== See also ==
Lists of molluscs of surrounding countries:

- List of non-marine molluscs of Panama
- List of non-marine molluscs of Venezuela
- List of non-marine molluscs of Brazil
- List of non-marine molluscs of Ecuador
- List of non-marine molluscs of Peru

Other nearby countries:

- List of non-marine molluscs of Jamaica
- List of non-marine molluscs of Haiti
- List of non-marine molluscs of the Dominican Republic
- List of non-marine molluscs of Honduras
- List of non-marine molluscs of Nicaragua
- List of non-marine molluscs of Costa Rica
