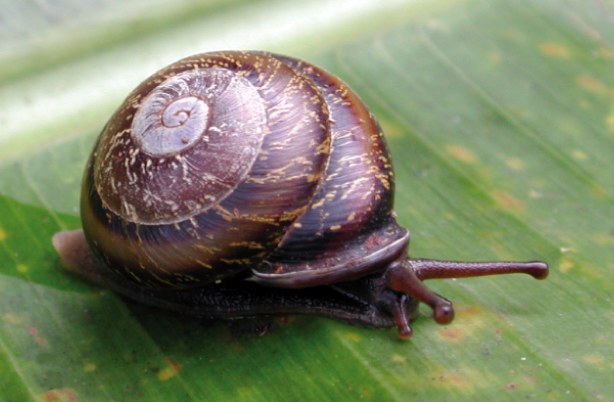
- Pleurodonte guadeloupensis dominicana

Scientific classification
- Kingdom: Animalia
- Phylum: Mollusca
- Class: Gastropoda
- Order: Stylommatophora
- Infraorder: Helicoidei
- Superfamily: Helicoidea
- Family: Pleurodontidae
- Genus: Pleurodonte; Fischer de Waldheim, 1807

Type species
- Helix lychnuchus O. F. Müller, 1774

Synonyms
- Caprinus Montfort, 1810; Chrysodon Ancey, 1887 (Replaced by Gonostomopsis on the assumption that it was preoccupied by Chrysodon Oken, 1815, which however was published in a work placed on the Official Index); Gonostomopsis Pilsbry, 1889; Helix (Caprinus) Montfort, 1810; Lucerna (Lucidula) Swainson, 1840; Lucernella Swainson, 1840; Pleurodonta Pilsbry, 1926 (inadvertent emendation); Pleurodonte (Pleurodonte) Fischer von Waldheim, 1807· accepted, alternate representation

= Pleurodonte =

Genus of gastropods

Pleurodonte is a genus of air-breathing land snails, terrestrial pulmonate gastropod mollusks in the subfamily Pleurodontinae of the family Pleurodontidae.

The genus Dentellaria Schumacher, 1817 is considered to be a synonym of Pleurodonte by Vera (2008), but Schileyko (2006) considered Dentellaria to be a separate genus.

== Distribution ==
The distribution of the genus Pleurodonte includes:

- Dominica (4 species)
- Jamaica (24 species)
- Colombia (when is Dentellaria considered as a synonym)

== Species ==
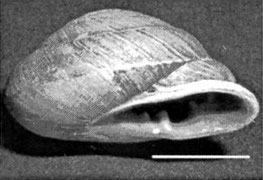
A shell of Pleurodonte sloaneana.

Species within the genus Pleurodonte include:

- Pleurodonte adamsiana Clapp, 1901
- Pleurodonte aureola Swainson
- Pleurodonte barbadensis Lamarck
- Pleurodonte dentiens (Férussac, 1822)
- † Pleurodonte desidens (Rang, 1834) - was endemic to Martinique
- Pleurodonte discolor (Férussac, 1821)
- Pleurodonte guadeloupensis(Pilsbry, 1889)
- Pleurodonte hippocastaneum Lamarck, 1792
- Pleurodonte incerta (Férussac, 1823)
- Pleurodonte isabella Férussac, 1822
- Pleurodonte josephinae (Férussac, 1832)
- † Pleurodonte lehneri (Trechmann, 1935)
- Pleurodonte lychnuchus (Müller, 1774)
- Pleurodonte nigrescens (Wood, 1828)
- Pleurodonte nucleola Rang, 1835
- Pleurodonte orbiculata (Férussac, 1822)
- Pleurodonte pachygastra (Gray, 1834)
- Pleurodonte soror (Férussac, 1821)
- † Pleurodonte wilsoni B. Roth, 1984

Taxon inquirendum

- † Pleurodonte debooyi Bartsch, 1918
- Pleurodonte obesa (Beck, 1837)

Species brought into synonymy

- Pleurodonte acuta (Lamarck, 1816): synonym of Lucerna lamarckii (Férussac, 1821) (junior synonym)
- Pleurodonte acutangula (Burrow, 1815): synonym of Polydontes acutangula (Burrow, 1815) (unaccepted combination)
- Pleurodonte amabilis (C. B. Adams, 1850): synonym of Dentellaria amabilis (C. B. Adams, 1850)
- Pleurodonte anomala (Pfeiffer, 1849): synonym of Dentellaria anomala (Pfeiffer, 1849)
- Pleurodonte atavus (Pfeiffer, 1859): synonym of Dentellaria atavus (Pfeiffer, 1859)
- Pleurodonte bainbridgii (Pfeiffer, 1845): synonym of Lucerna bainbridgii (L. Pfeiffer, 1845)
- Pleurodonte bifurcata (Deshayes, 1838): synonym of Isomeria bifurcata (Deshayes, 1838): synonym of Labyrinthus bifurcatus (Deshayes, 1838) (unaccepted combination)
- Pleurodonte bizonalis (Deshayes, 1850): synonym of Caracolus bizonalis (Deshayes, 1850) (unaccepted combination)
- Pleurodonte bowdeniana Simpson, 1895 †: synonym of Lucerna bowdeniana (Simpson, 1895) † (new combination)
- Pleurodonte bronni (Pfeiffer, 1846): synonym of Dentellaria bronni (L. Pfeiffer, 1846)
- Pleurodonte browneana (L. Pfeiffer, 1862): synonym of Dentellaria tridentina (Férussac, 1832) (junior synonym)
- Pleurodonte candescens C. B. Adams, 1850: synonym of Dentellaria candescens (C. B. Adams, 1850)
- Pleurodonte cara (C. B. Adams, 1849): synonym of Dentellaria cara (C. B. Adams, 1849)
- Pleurodonte carmelita (Férussac, 1821): synonym of Lucerna mora (Gray in Griffith & Pidgeon, 1833)
- Pleurodonte carocolla (Linnaeus, 1758): synonym of Caracolus carocolla (Linnaeus, 1758) (unaccepted combination)
- Pleurodonte catadupae H. B. Baker, 1935: synonym of Dentellaria catadupae (H. B. Baker, 1935)
- Pleurodonte chemnitziana (Pfeiffer, 1845): synonym of Lucerna chemnitziana (L. Pfeiffer, 1845)
- Pleurodonte clappi Pilsbry, 1901: synonym of Labyrinthus clappi (Pilsbry, 1901) (original name)
- Pleurodonte crispata (Férussac, 1821): synonym of Hispaniolana crispatus (Férussac, 1821) (unaccepted combination)
- Pleurodonte crusta (Dall, 1890) †: synonym of Cepolis (Plagioptycha) crusta (Dall, 1890) † represented as Cepolis crusta (Dall, 1890) †
- † Pleurodonte cunctator (Dall, 1890): synonym of Cepolis (Plagioptycha) cunctator (Dall, 1890) represented as † Cepolis cunctator (Dall, 1890)
- † Pleurodonte diespiter (Dall, 1890) : synonym of † Pleurodontites diespiter (Dall, 1890)
- † Pleurodonte eohippina Cockerell, 1915 : synonym of † Eohipptychia eohippina (Cockerell, 1915) (new combination)
- Pleurodonte fragilis Haas, 1949: synonym of Labyrinthus raimondii (Philippi, 1867) (junior synonym)
- Pleurodonte gigantea (Scopoli, 1786): synonym of Hispaniolana gigantea (Scopoli, 1786) (unaccepted combination)
- Pleurodonte goldmani Dall, 1912: synonym of Labyrinthus subplanatus sipunculatus (Forbes, 1850) (junior synonym)
- Pleurodonte gudeana Ancey, 1904: synonym of Isomeria basidens gudeana (Ancey, 1904) (original combination)
- Pleurodonte haruspica (Dall, 1890) †: synonym of Pleurodontites haruspica (Dall, 1890) †
- Pleurodonte hesperarche (Cockerell, 1914) †: synonym of Hodopoeus hesperarche (Cockerell, 1914) †
- Pleurodonte ingens (C. B. Adams, 1850): synonym of Lucerna lamarckii (Férussac, 1821)
- Pleurodonte invalida (C. B. Adams, 1850): synonym of Dentellaria invalida (C. B. Adams, 1850) (unaccepted combination)
- Pleurodonte kendrickensis Mansfield, 1937 †: synonym of Pleurodontites kendrickensis (Mansfield, 1937) † (new combination)
- Pleurodonte lima (Férussac, 1821): synonym of Granodomus lima (Férussac, 1821) (unaccepted combination)
- Pleurodonte lindsleyana (Vendryes, 1899): synonym of Dentellaria atavus (L. Pfeiffer, 1859) (junior synonym)
- Pleurodonte lucerna (Müller, 1774): synonym of Lucerna lucerna (O. F. Müller, 1774)
- Pleurodonte marginella (Gmelin, 1791): synonym of Caracolus marginella (Gmelin, 1791) (unaccepted combination)
- Pleurodonte michalkovaci H. Binder & Harzhauser, 2008 †: synonym of Pseudochloritis michalkovaci (H. Binder & Harzhauser, 2008) †
- Pleurodonte mora Gray in Griffith, 1834: synonym of Lucerna mora (Gray in Griffith & Pidgeon, 1833)
- † Pleurodonte norica H. Binder, 2004: synonym of † Pseudochloritis norica (H. Binder, 2004)
- Pleurodonte okeniana (Pfeiffer, 1845): synonym of Dentellaria okeniana (L. Pfeiffer, 1845)
- Pleurodonte oxytenes (Pilsbry, 1889): synonym of Lucerna lucerna (O. F. Müller, 1774) (junior synonym)
- Pleurodonte pallescens (C. B. Adams, 1851): synonym of Dentellaria pallescens (C. B. Adams, 1851) (unaccepted combination)
- Pleurodonte peracutissima (C. B. Adams, 1845): synonym of Lucerna lucerna (O. F. Müller, 1774) (junior synonym)
- Pleurodonte picturata (C. B. Adams, 1849): synonym of Dentellaria picturata (C. B. Adams, 1849) (unaccepted combination)
- Pleurodonte pretiosa (C. B. Adams, 1851): synonym of Lucerna bainbridgii (L. Pfeiffer, 1845) (junior homonym of Helix pretiosa Albers, 1850)
- Pleurodonte schroeteriana (L. Pfeiffer, 1845): synonym of Dentellaria schroeteriana (L. Pfeiffer, 1845) (unaccepted combination)
- Pleurodonte simsoni (L. Pfeiffer, 1852): synonym of Dentellaria candescens (C. B. Adams, 1850) (junior synonym)
- Pleurodonte sinuata (Müller, 1774): synonym of Dentellaria sinuata (O. F. Müller, 1774) (unaccepted combination)
- Pleurodonte sloaneana (Pfeiffer, 1868): synonym of Dentellaria sloaneana (L. Pfeiffer, 1868) (unaccepted combination)
- Pleurodonte spengleriana (L. Pfeiffer, 1847): synonym of Lucerna bainbridgii (L. Pfeiffer, 1845) (junior synonym)
- Pleurodonte strangulata (C. B. Adams, 1849): synonym of Dentellaria strangulata (C. B. Adams, 1849) (unaccepted combination)
- Pleurodonte subacuta (Pfeiffer, 1867): synonym of Lucerna subacuta (L. Pfeiffer, 1867) (unaccepted combination)
- Pleurodonte sublucerna (Pilsbry, 1889): synonym of Lucerna sublucerna (Pilsbry, 1889) (unaccepted combination)
- Pleurodonte tenaculum Dall, 1909: synonym of Labyrinthus uncigerus (Petit, 1838) (junior synonym)
- Pleurodonte tridentina (Férussac, 1832): synonym of Lucerna sublucerna (Pilsbry, 1889) (unaccepted combination)
- Pleurodonte undulata (Férussac, 1821): synonym of Hispaniolana crispatus (Férussac, 1821) (based on an invalid original name)
- Pleurodonte vacillans Vendryes, 1902: synonym of Lucerna vacillans Vendryes, 1902 (unaccepted combination)
- Pleurodonte valida (C. B. Adams, 1850): synonym of Dentellaria valida (C. B. Adams, 1850) (unaccepted combination)
