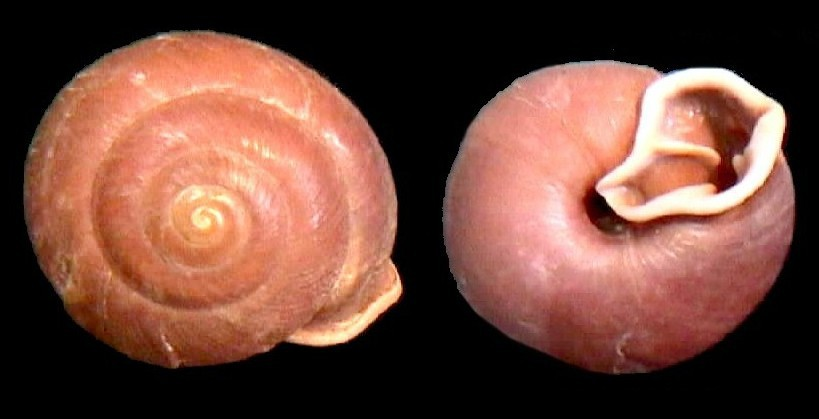
- Two shells of Labyrinthus plicatus

Scientific classification
- Domain: Eukaryota
- Kingdom: Animalia
- Phylum: Mollusca
- Class: Gastropoda
- Order: Stylommatophora
- Family: Labyrinthidae
- Genus: Labyrinthus
- Species: L. plicatus

Binomial name
- Labyrinthus plicatus (Born, 1780)

Synonyms
- Helix plicata Born, 1780; Pleurodonte plicata; Labyrinthus plicata

= Labyrinthus plicatus =

Species of Gastropoda

Labyrinthus plicatus is a species of air-breathing land snail, a terrestrial pulmonate gastropod mollusk in the family Labyrinthidae.

== Distribution ==
This species occurs in:

- Venezuela
  - El Hatillo Municipality, Miranda, Venezuela
- Colombia
- Panama
