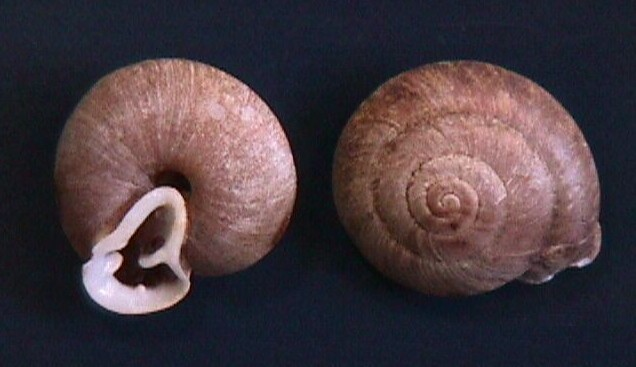
- Shells of Labyrinthus umbrus

Scientific classification
- Kingdom: Animalia
- Phylum: Mollusca
- Class: Gastropoda
- Order: Stylommatophora
- Family: Labyrinthidae
- Genus: Labyrinthus
- Species: L. umbrus

Binomial name
- Labyrinthus umbrus Thompson, 1957

= Labyrinthus umbrus =

Species of gastropod

Labyrinthus umbrus is a species of air-breathing land snail, a terrestrial pulmonate gastropod mollusk in the family Labyrinthidae.

This taxon was described as Labyrinthus umbrus by Fred Gilbert Thompson from Rancho Grande, Aragua in Venezuela in 1957.

Alan Solem considered this taxon as a subspecies Labyrinthus leucodon umbrus in 1966.

== Distribution ==
This species occurs in:

- Venezuela
  - El Hatillo Municipality, Miranda, Venezuela
