= Pleurodonte desidens =

Conservation status
- Extinct (IUCN 2.3)

Scientific classification
- Kingdom: Animalia
- Phylum: Mollusca
- Class: Gastropoda
- Order: Stylommatophora
- Family: Pleurodontidae
- Genus: Pleurodonte
- Species: †P. desidens

Binomial name
- †Pleurodonte desidens (Rang, 1834)

Species of gastropod

†Pleurodonte desidens was a species of air-breathing land snail, a terrestrial pulmonate gastropod mollusk in the family Pleurodontidae. This species was endemic to Martinique. It is now extinct.
