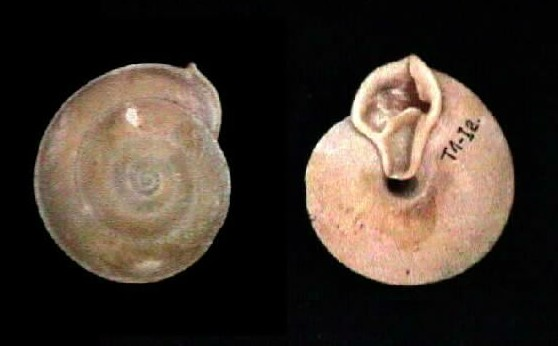
- Two shells of Labyrinthus leucodon

Scientific classification
- Kingdom: Animalia
- Phylum: Mollusca
- Class: Gastropoda
- Order: Stylommatophora
- Family: Labyrinthidae
- Genus: Labyrinthus
- Species: L. leucodon

Binomial name
- Labyrinthus leucodon (Pfeiffer, 1847)

Synonyms
- Helix leucodon Pfeifer, 1847; Helix leucodon Revee, 1852; Labyrinthus quadridentatus Martens, 1860; Labyrinthus leucodon Jouseme, 1889; Pleurodonte (Labyrinthus) leucodon Pilsbry, 1894; Helix (Labyrinthus) leucodon Pilsbry, 1898; Pleurodonte (Labyrinthus) leucodon Baker, 1926

= Labyrinthus leucodon =

Species of gastropod

Labyrinthus leucodon is a species of air-breathing land snail, a terrestrial pulmonate gastropod mollusk in the family Labyrinthidae.

== Description ==
The periphery of the shell of this species is acutely angulated. The spire is normally elevated, and the sides of the spire are flat to slightly rounded. The shell aperture is moderately deflected. Within the aperture, the high, simple parietal lamella starts descending before it runs into the parietal lip. The basal lip has a broad, prominent knob. The lower palatal tooth is a prominent, crescentic lamella, with strong lateral buttresses. The upper palatal lip often has a small tuberculate denticle.

The periostracum is brownish in color, occasionally speckled with greenish yellow.

== Distribution ==
This species occurs in:

- Venezuela (reported for the states of Carabobo, Distrito Capital, Falcón, Mérida, Vargas and Yaracuy)
- Colombia

== See also ==
- List of molluscs of Falcón State, Venezuela
- List of non-marine molluscs of Venezuela
