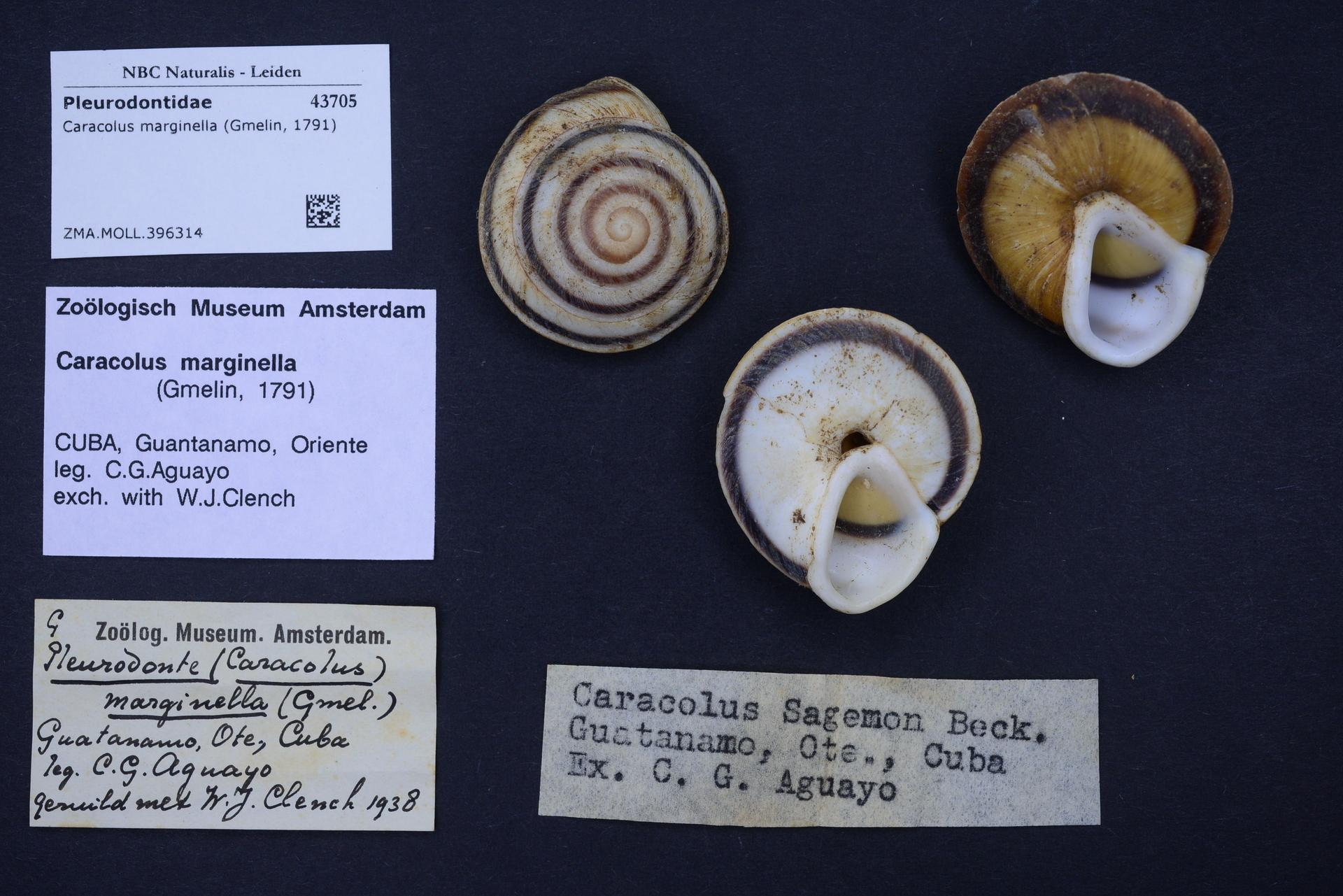
- Caracolus marginella shells

Conservation status
- Secure (NatureServe)

Scientific classification
- Kingdom: Animalia
- Phylum: Mollusca
- Class: Gastropoda
- Order: Stylommatophora
- Family: Solaropsidae
- Genus: Caracolus
- Species: C. marginella

Binomial name
- Caracolus marginella (Gmelin, 1791)

Synonyms
- Caracolus marginellus (Gmelin, 1791)

= Caracolus marginella =

Species of gastropod

Caracolus marginella is a species of air-breathing land snail, a terrestrial pulmonate gastropod mollusk in the family Pleurodontidae.

== Distribution ==
The distribution of Caracolus marginella includes:

- Puerto Rico
- Florida

== Description ==
The shell has 5-6 whorls. The width of the shell is 35–45 mm.
