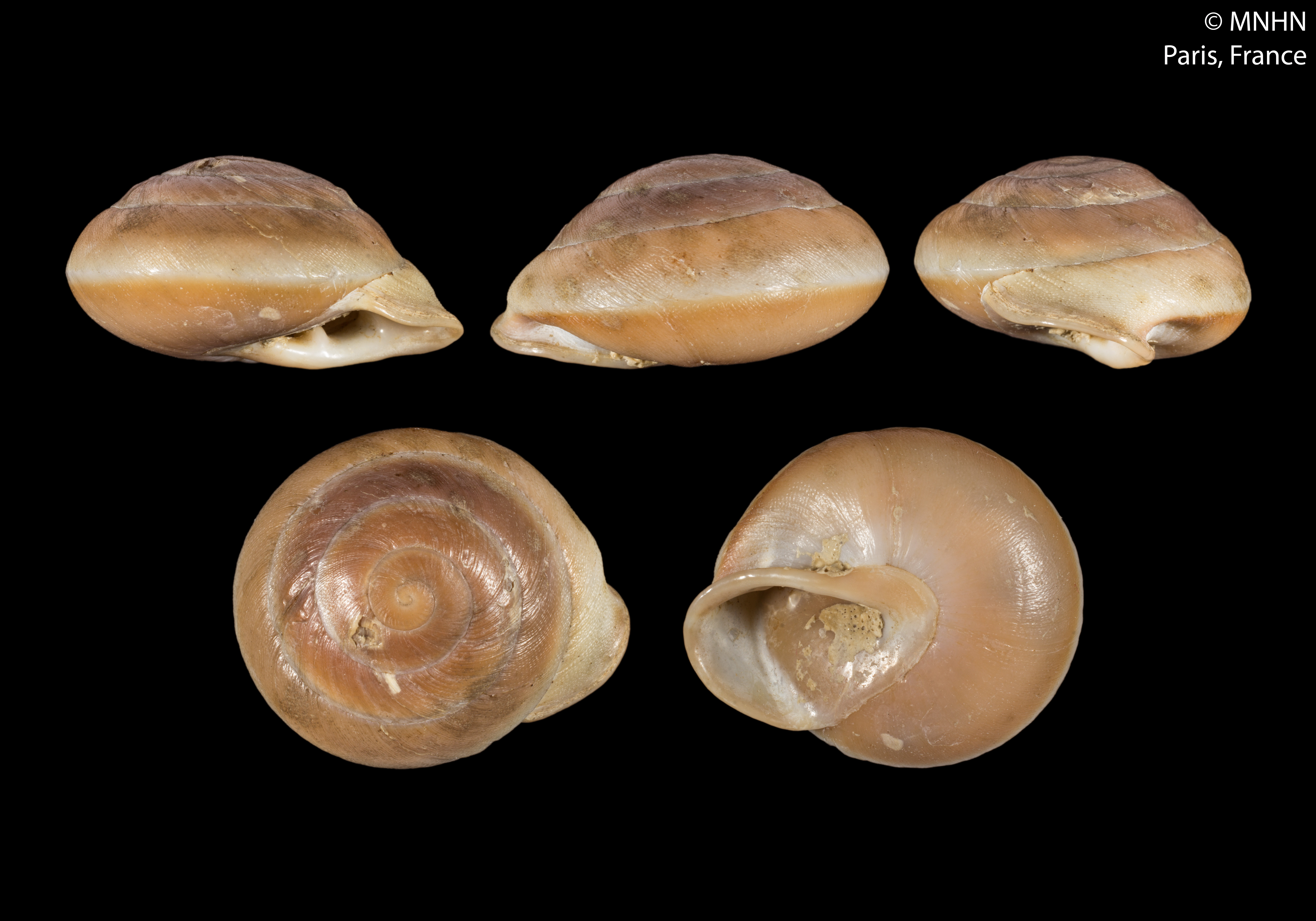
- Shell of Lucerna lucerna (specimen at MNHN, Paris)

Scientific classification
- Kingdom: Animalia
- Phylum: Mollusca
- Class: Gastropoda
- Order: Stylommatophora
- Family: Pleurodontidae
- Genus: Lucerna; Swainson, 1840

Type species
- Carocolla acutissima Lamarck, 1822

= Lucerna (gastropod) =

Genus of gastropods

Lucerna is a genus of air-breathing land snails, terrestrial pulmonate gastropod mollusks in the subfamily Lucerninae of the family Pleurodontidae.

== Species ==
Species within the genus Lucerna include:

- Lucerna bainbridgii (L. Pfeiffer, 1845)
- †Lucerna bernardi (Kimball, 1947)
- †Lucerna bowdeniana (Simpson, 1895)
- Lucerna chemnitziana (L. Pfeiffer, 1845)
- Lucerna lamarckii (Férussac, 1821)
- Lucerna lucerna (O. F. Müller, 1774)
- Lucerna mora (Gray in Griffith & Pidgeon, 1833)
- Lucerna subacuta (L. Pfeiffer, 1867)
- Lucerna sublucerna Pilsbry, 1889
- Lucerna vacillans Vendreyes, 1902

Synonyms

- Lucerna (Lucidula) Swainson, 1840: synonym of Pleurodonte Fischer von Waldheim, 1807
