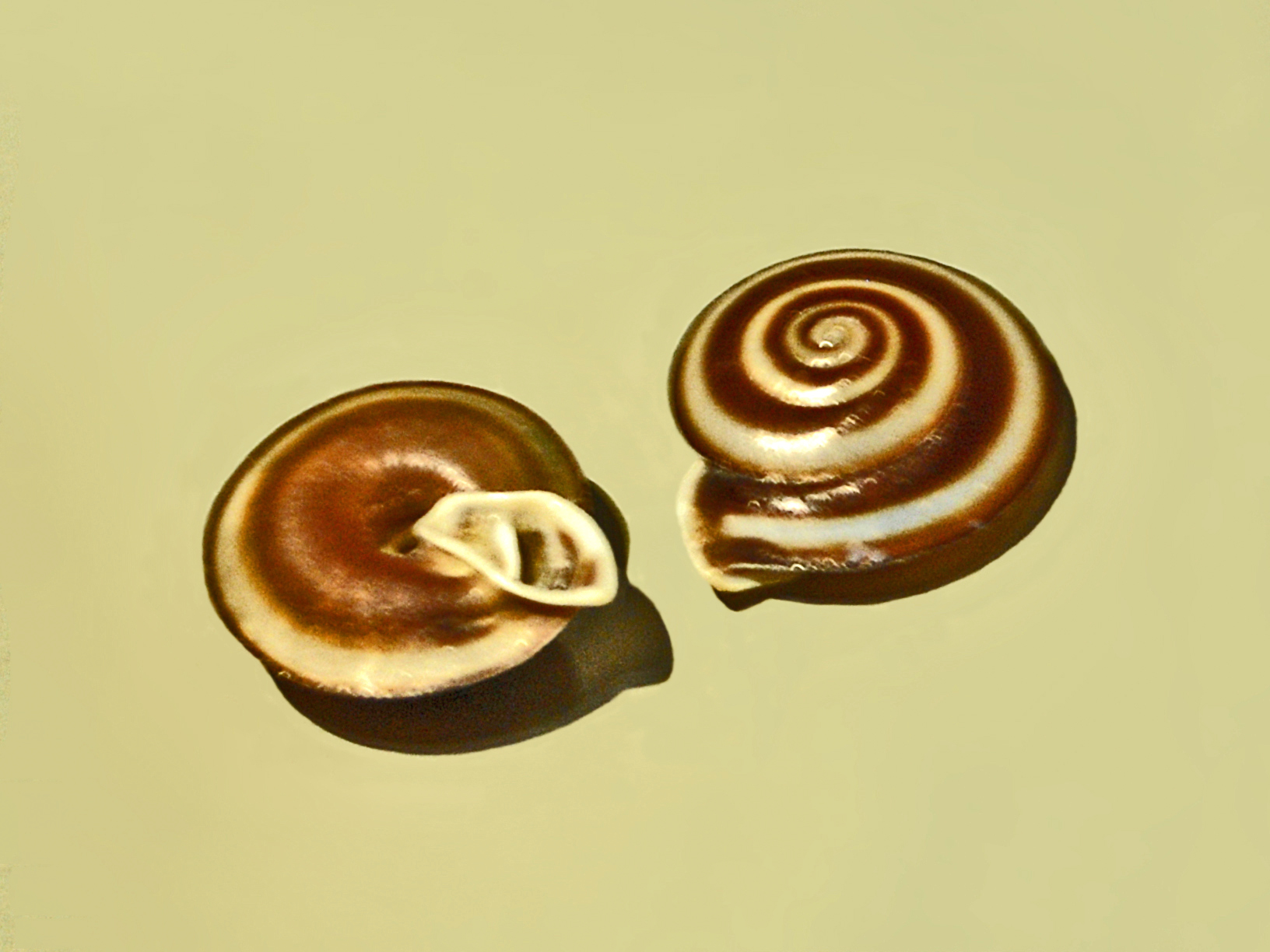
- Two shells of Labyrinthus chiriquensis from Chiriquí (Panama), on display at the Museo Civico di Storia Naturale di Milano

Scientific classification
- Kingdom: Animalia
- Phylum: Mollusca
- Class: Gastropoda
- Order: Stylommatophora
- Family: Labyrinthidae
- Genus: Labyrinthus
- Species: L. chiriquensis

Binomial name
- Labyrinthus chiriquensis H.A. Pilsbry, 1910

Synonyms
- Lampadion chiriquensis (Pilsbry, 1899)

= Labyrinthus chiriquensis =

Species of gastropod

Labyrinthus chiriquensis is a species of air-breathing land snail, a terrestrial pulmonate gastropod mollusk in the family Labyrinthidae.

== Description ==
Labyrinthus chiriquensis can reach diameter of about 25–30 millimetres (0.98–1.18 in).

== Distribution ==
This species occurs in Panama.
