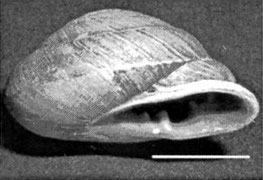
- Black-and-white photo: an apertural view of a shell of Dentellaria sloaneana from Jamaica. Scale bar = 1 cm.

Scientific classification
- Kingdom: Animalia
- Phylum: Mollusca
- Class: Gastropoda
- Order: Stylommatophora
- Family: Pleurodontidae
- Genus: Dentellaria
- Species: D. sloaneana

Binomial name
- Dentellaria sloaneana (L. Pfeiffer, 1868)

Synonyms
- Helix (Lucerna) vendryesi Cockerell, 1892 (junior synonym); Helix sloaneana L. Pfeiffer, 1868 (original combination); Pleurodonte sloaneana (L. Pfeiffer, 1868) (unaccepted combination)

= Dentellaria sloaneana =

Species of gastropod

Dentellaria sloaneana is a species of air-breathing land snail, a terrestrial pulmonate gastropod mollusk in the family Pleurodontidae.

This species occurs in Jamaica.
