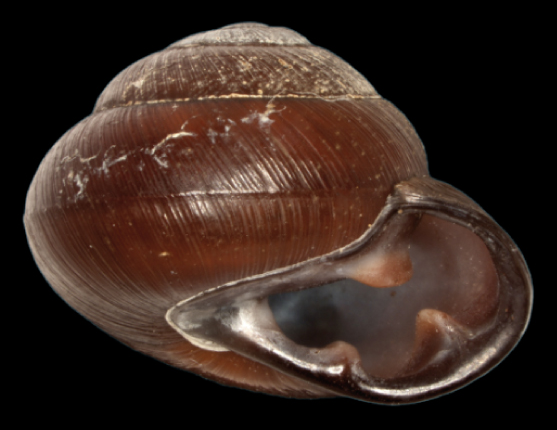
- Apertural view of a shell of Pleurodonte nigrescens. The height of the shell is 11.1 mm.

Scientific classification
- Domain: Eukaryota
- Kingdom: Animalia
- Phylum: Mollusca
- Class: Gastropoda
- Order: Stylommatophora
- Family: Pleurodontidae
- Genus: Pleurodonte
- Species: P. nigrescens

Binomial name
- Pleurodonte nigrescens (Wood, 1828)

Synonyms
- Helix nigrescens; Helix (Dentellaria) nigrescens

= Pleurodonte nigrescens =

Species of gastropod

Pleurodonte nigrescens is a species of tropical air-breathing land snail, a pulmonate gastropod mollusk in the family Pleurodontidae.

== Distribution ==
The distribution of Pleurodonte nigrescens includes:

- Guadeloupe
- Dominica

== Description ==
Pleurodonte nigrescens differs from all other Dominican Pleurodonte species by the characteristic parietal tooth opposite the basal teeth in the aperture. The shell can be chesnut-brown with fine axial lines or purple-black with a purple aperture.

== Ecology ==
Pleurodonte nigrescens lives in damp leaf litter on the forest floor. This species appears to prefer relatively undisturbed habitats, especially in rain forest at higher altitudes in Dominica.
