= B. crispa =

B. crispa may refer to:

- Boettgeria crispa, a gastropod species
- Buddleja crispa, a bush species
- Byrsonima crispa, a nance tree species in the genus Byrsonima

== See also ==
- Crispa (disambiguation)
