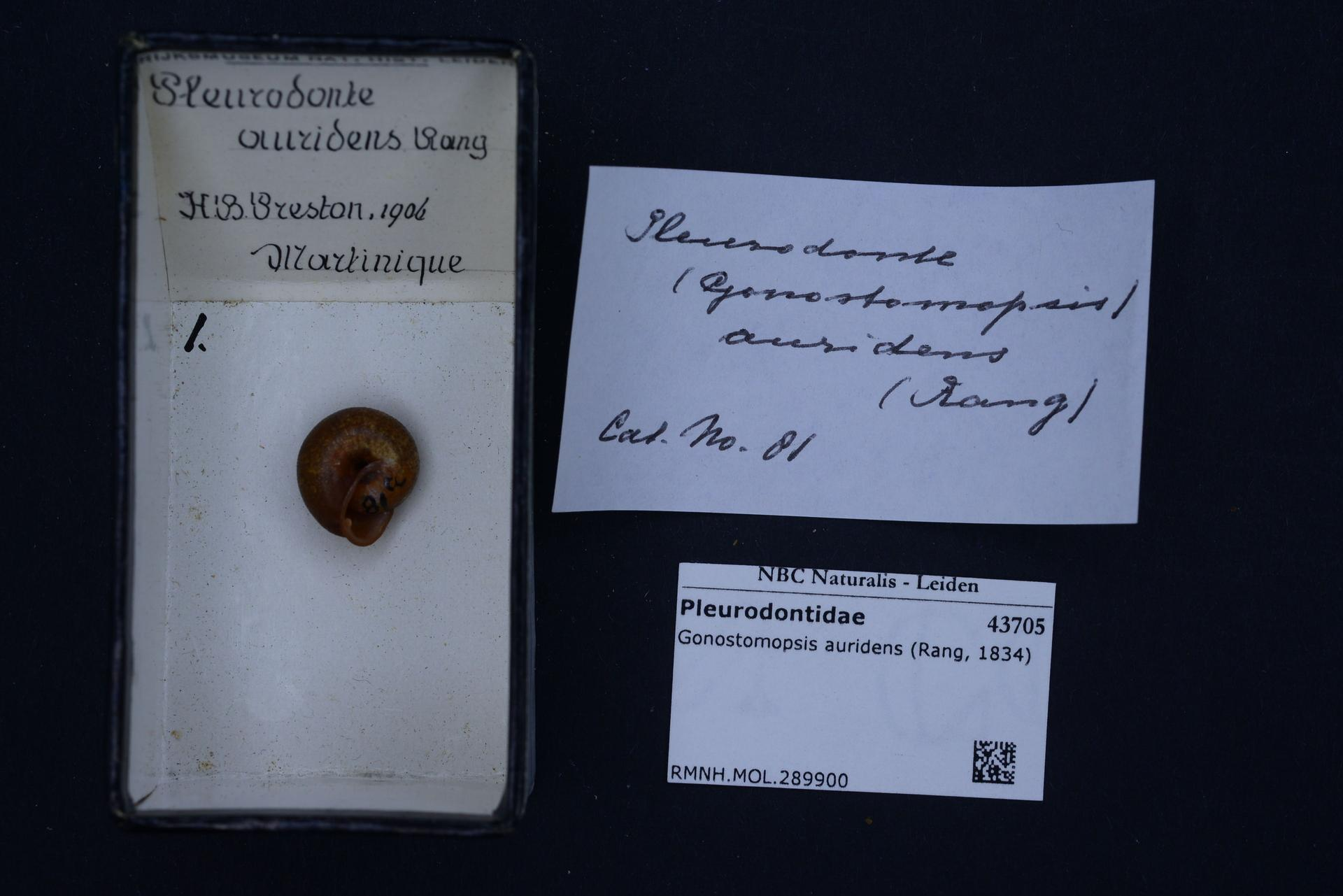
- Shell of Gonostomopsis auridens

Scientific classification
- Kingdom: Animalia
- Phylum: Mollusca
- Class: Gastropoda
- Order: Stylommatophora
- Infraorder: Helicoidei
- Superfamily: Helicoidea
- Family: Pleurodontidae
- Genus: Gonostomopsis; Pilsbry, 1889

Synonyms
- Chrysodon Ancey, 1887 (Replaced by Gonostomopsis on the assumption that it was preoccupied by Chrysodon Oken, 1815, which however was published in a work placed on the Official Index)

= Gonostomopsis =

Genus of gastropods

Gonostomopsis is a genus of air-breathing land snails, terrestrial pulmonate gastropod mollusks in the subfamily Pleurodontinae of the family Pleurodontidae.

== Genera ==
- Gonostomopsis auridens (Rang, 1834) (synonym: Helix auridens Rang, 1834, Pleurodonte auridens (Rang, 1834))

== Description ==
The shell is narrowly umbilicated, rather thin, opaque, hirsute. The spire is depressed, body-whorl depressed, rounded at periphery. The Aperture is as high as wide and trilobate-lunar. The peristome is narrowly expanded, the outer and basal margins each with one tooth. Type P. auridens.

== Distribution ==
This genus occurs in the Caribbean Sea off Martinique.
