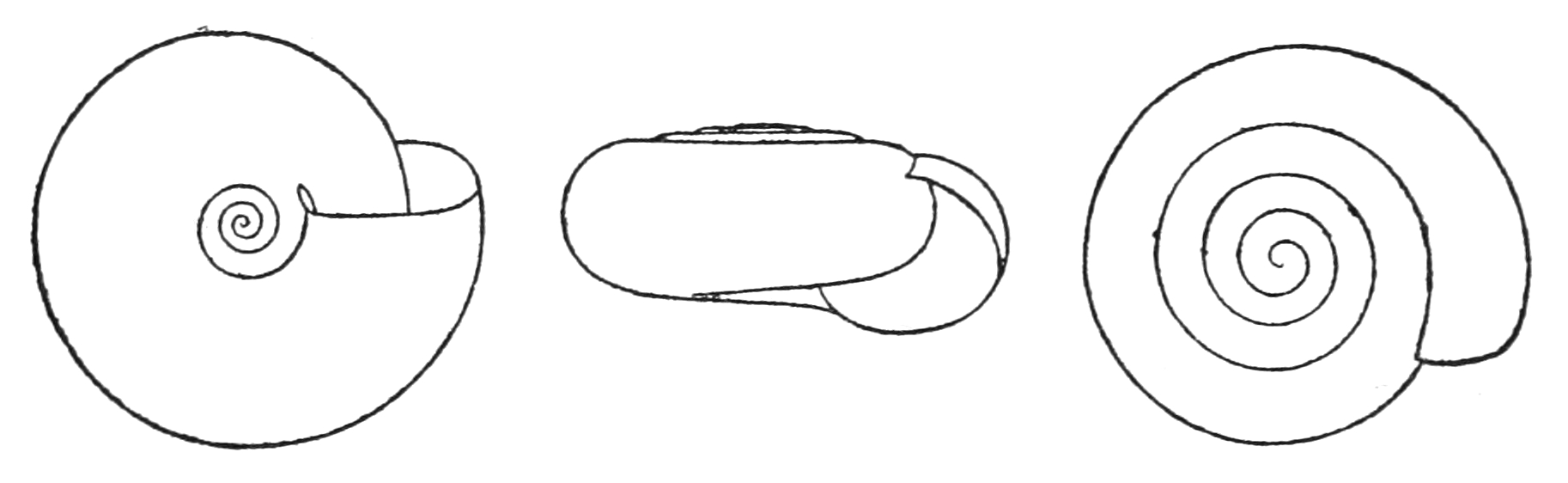
- Three views of a shell of Microphysula cookei

Scientific classification
- Kingdom: Animalia
- Phylum: Mollusca
- Class: Gastropoda
- Order: Stylommatophora
- Family: Thysanophoridae
- Genus: Microphysula; Cockerell & Pilsbry, 1926

= Microphysula =

Genus of gastropods

Microphysula is a genus of air-breathing land snails, terrestrial pulmonate gastropod mollusks in the family Thysanophoridae.

== Species ==
Species in the genus Microphysula include:

- Microphysula cookei (Pilsbry, 1922) - Vancouver snail
- Microphysula ingersolli (Bland, 1875) - spruce snail - type species
