= Coloniconcha =

Scientific classification
- Kingdom: Animalia
- Phylum: Mollusca
- Class: Gastropoda
- Order: Stylommatophora
- Family: Pleurodontidae
- Genus: Coloniconcha; Pilsbry, 1933
- Species: C. prima

Binomial name
- Coloniconcha prima Pilsbry, 1933

Genus of gastropods

Coloniconcha prima is a species of air-breathing semi-slug, a terrestrial pulmonate gastropod mollusk in the family Pleurodontidae. It is the only species in the genus Coloniconcha.

== Description ==
Coloniconcha prima has a thin semioval shell. The shape of the shell is similar to Vitrina. The color of the shell is yellow with green tint. The shell has 2.5 whorls. The width of the shell is 22.3 mm.

The animal is greenish yellow in color with dark tentacles. Black spots on the mantle are visible through translucent shell.

== Distribution and habitat ==
It is endemic to the Caribbean island of Hispaniola, where it is found in Chaîne de la Selle in Haiti and the Baoruco Mountain Range and Sierra de Martin García in the Dominican Republic.
