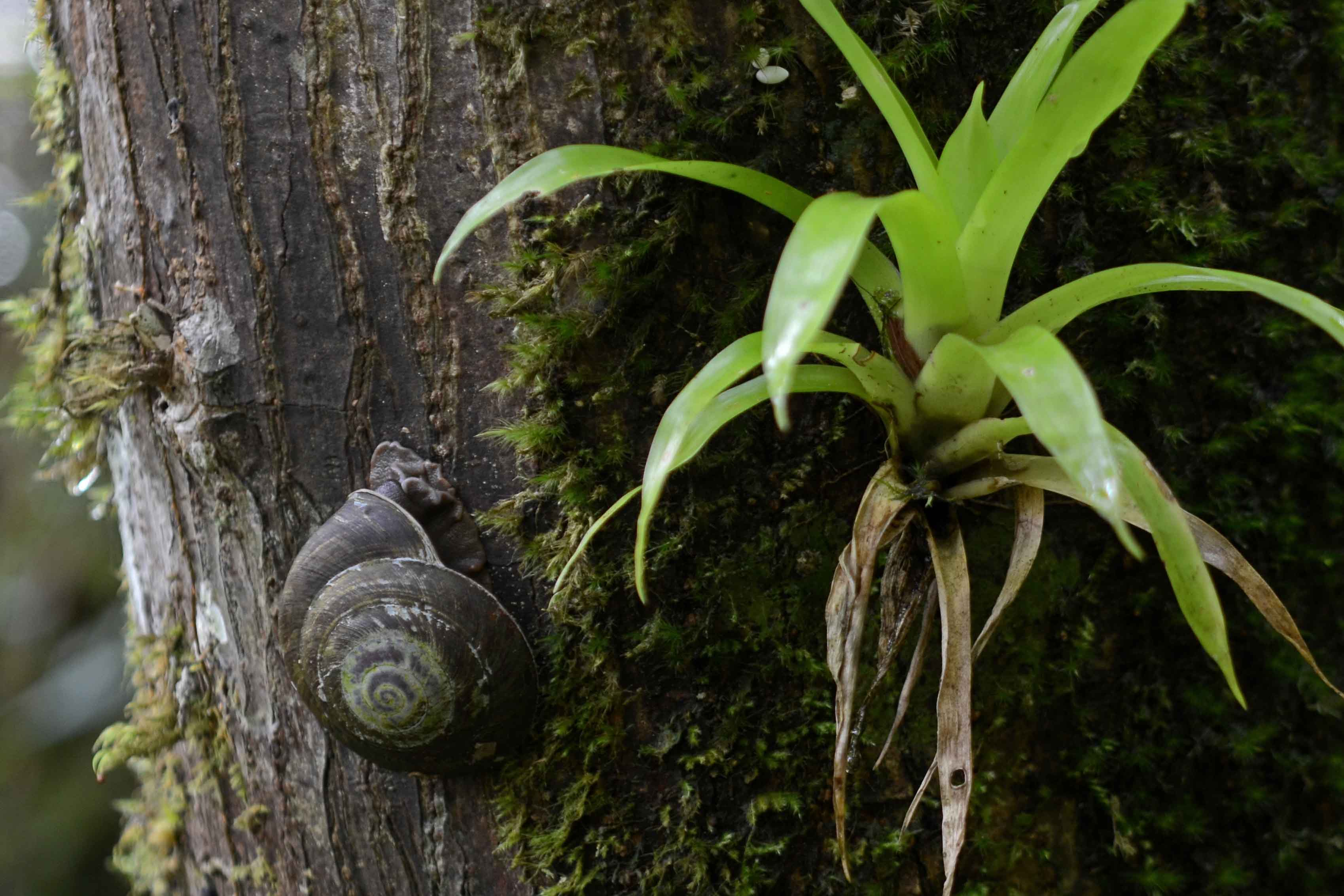
- Caracolus caracolla

Scientific classification
- Kingdom: Animalia
- Phylum: Mollusca
- Class: Gastropoda
- Order: Stylommatophora
- Suborder: Helicina
- Superfamily: Sagdoidea
- Family: Solaropsidae
- Genus: Caracolus; Montfort, 1810

Type species
- Caracolus oculatus Montfort, 1810

Synonyms
- Caracolla Montfort, 1810; Carocolla Gray, 1825 (incorrect subsequent spelling or emendation); Corocolla auct. (incorrect subsequent spelling); Discodoma Swainson, 1840; Helix (Caracolla) Albers, 1850 (unaccepted rank); Helix (Caracolus) Montfort, 1810; Helix (Carocolla) (incorrect subsequent spelling); Serpentulus Adams, 1855; Vortex Oken, 1815 (Not available name: Published in a work placed on the Official Index by Opinion 417); Wurtzorbis Webb, 1970

= Caracolus =

Genus of gastropods

Caracolus is a genus of air-breathing land snails, terrestrial pulmonate gastropod mollusks in the family Solaropsidae.

== Species ==
Species within the genus Caracolus include:

- Caracolus albilabris Lamarck, 1816
- † Caracolus aquilonaris Bishop, 1979
- Caracolus bicolor Lamarck, 1816
- Caracolus bizonalis (Deshayes, 1850)
- Caracolus caracolla Oken
- Caracolus carinatus (Röding, 1798)
- Caracolus carocolla (Linnaeus, 1758)
- Caracolus cimarron Espinosa, Fernández-Velázquez & Ortea, 2016
- Caracolus marginella (Gmelin, 1791)

Species brought into synonymy

- Caracolus oculatus Montfort, 1810: synonym of Caracolus carocolla (Linnaeus, 1758)
