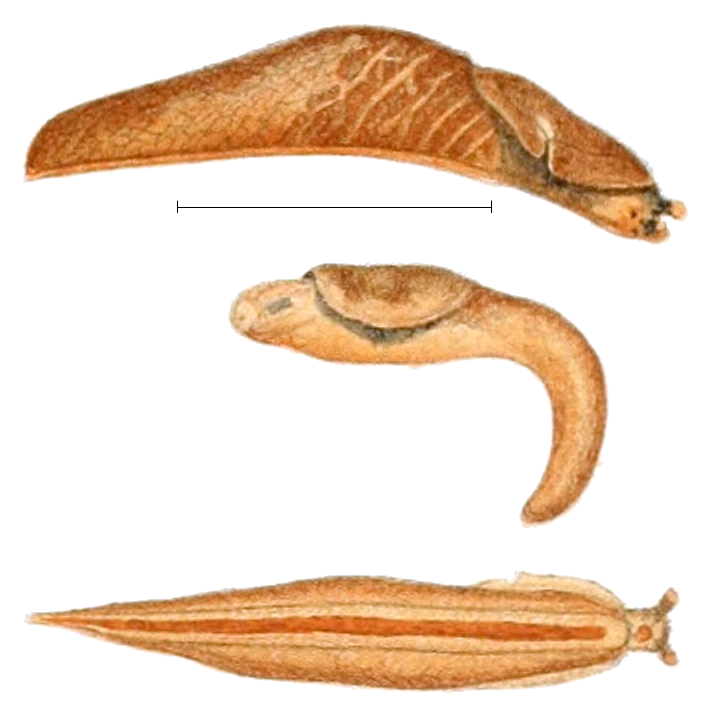
- A 1910 drawing of preserved specimens of Boettgerilla compressa from the original description by Heinrich Simroth

Scientific classification
- Kingdom: Animalia
- Phylum: Mollusca
- Class: Gastropoda
- Order: Stylommatophora
- Family: Boettgerillidae
- Genus: Boettgerilla
- Species: B. compressa

Binomial name
- Boettgerilla compressa Simroth, 1910

= Boettgerilla compressa =

Species of gastropod

Boettgerilla compressa is a species of air-breathing land slug, a terrestrial pulmonate gastropod mollusk in the family Boettgerillidae.

Boettgerilla compressa is the type species of the genus Boettgerilla.

== Distribution ==
The type locality of Boettgerilla compressa is Tsebelda, Abkhazia. Another known locality is the environs of the Bagrati Cathedral near Kutaisi in Georgia.

== Description ==
The body of this slug is narrow. The slug has a length of about 2 cm.
