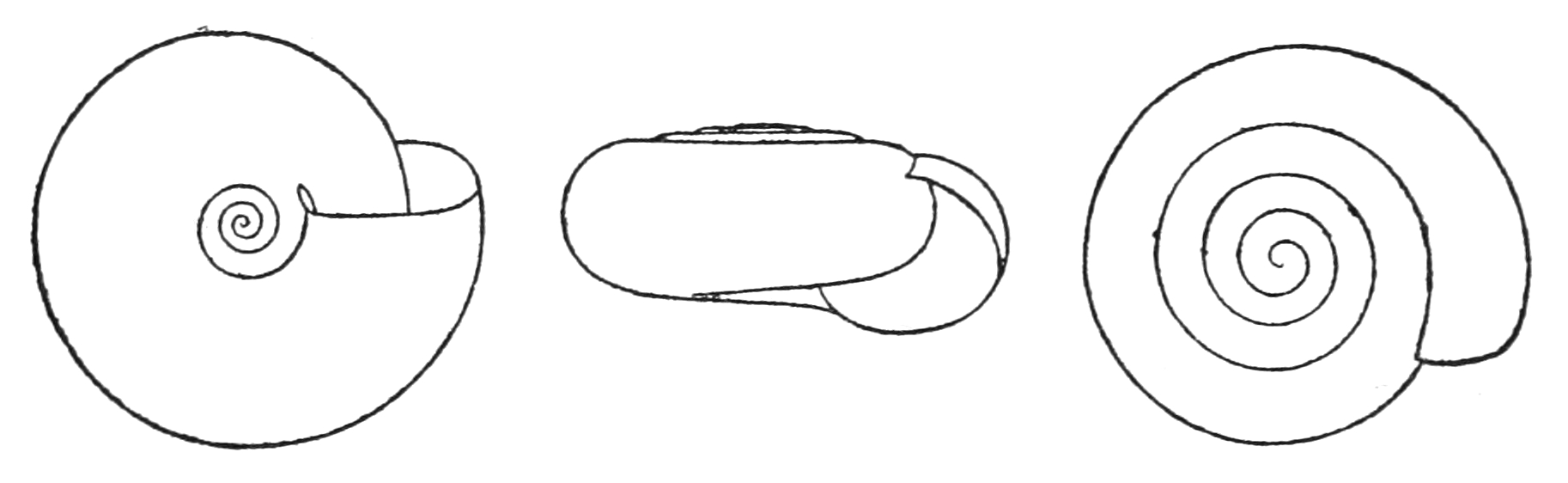
- shell of Microphysula cookei from its original description

Conservation status
- Secure (NatureServe)

Scientific classification
- Kingdom: Animalia
- Phylum: Mollusca
- Class: Gastropoda
- Order: Stylommatophora
- Family: Thysanophoridae
- Genus: Microphysula
- Species: M. cookei

Binomial name
- Microphysula cookei (Pilsbry, 1922)

Synonyms
- Zonitoides cookei Pilsbry, 1922

= Microphysula cookei =

Species of gastropod

Microphysula cookei, common name the Vancouver snail, is a species of air-breathing land snail, a terrestrial pulmonate gastropod mollusk in the family Thysanophoridae.

== Original description ==
The species Microphysula cookei was originally described as Zonitoides cookei by Henry Augustus Pilsbry in 1922.

Pilsbry's original text (the type description) reads as follows:

Zonitoides cookei n. sp. Fig. 1.

The shell is discoidal, the spire very slightly convex, umbilicus regularly diminishing inward, very nearly one-fourth the diameter of the shell; whitish, glossy, smoothish, under the microscope showing faint growth lines and on the upper surface an excessively minute, close and shallow spiral striation on the last 2 or 3 whorls. The whorls increase slowly and are rather convex, the suture rather deeply impressed, last whorl rounded peripherally. The aperture is rather narrow, crescentic. Height 1.7, diam. 3.6 mm.; 4
$$\begin{matrix} \frac{1}{2} \end{matrix}$$
whorls.

Cameron Lake, Vancouver Island. Type no. 130623 A. N. S. P. Specimens also contained in the Bishop Museum.

This species is distinguished by its very low spire of narrowly coiled whorls, and especially by the narrow aperture. The generic reference is uncertain, as we do not know whether it possesses the Vitrea or the Zonitoides type of teeth, and the shell characters are not decisive. However, the suture is deeper than in our small species of Vitrea or Polita. Named for Dr. C. Montague Cooke.
