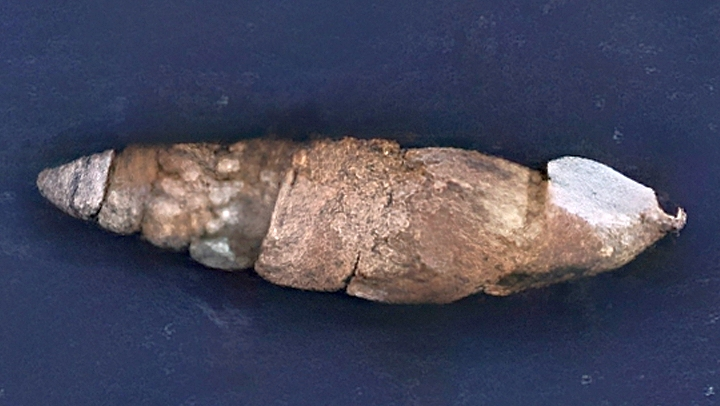

Conservation status
- Critically Endangered (IUCN 3.1)

Scientific classification
- Kingdom: Animalia
- Phylum: Mollusca
- Class: Gastropoda
- Order: Stylommatophora
- Family: Clausiliidae
- Genus: Boettgeria
- Species: B. obesiuscula

Binomial name
- Boettgeria obesiuscula (R.T. Lowe, 1863)

= Boettgeria obesiuscula =

Species of gastropod

Boettgeria obesiuscula is a species of small, very elongate, air-breathing land snails, terrestrial pulmonate gastropod mollusks in the family Clausiliidae, the door snails, all of which have a clausilium.

This species is endemic to Portugal.
