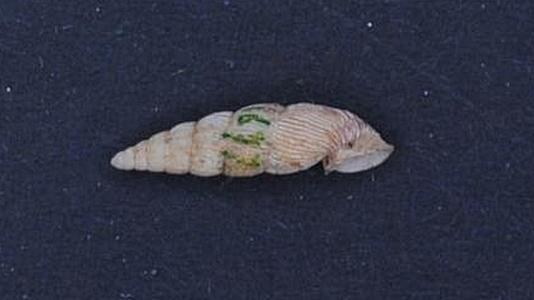
- Boettgeria crispa

Scientific classification
- Domain: Eukaryota
- Kingdom: Animalia
- Phylum: Mollusca
- Class: Gastropoda
- Order: Stylommatophora
- Family: Clausiliidae
- Subfamily: Clausiliinae
- Genus: Boettgeria; Boettger, 1863

= Boettgeria =

Genus of gastropods

Boettgeria is a genus of small, very elongate, air-breathing land snails, terrestrial pulmonate gastropod mollusks in the family Clausiliidae, the door snails, all of which have a clausilium.

This genus of door snails should not be confused with a genus of slugs that has a similar name: Boettgerilla Simroth, 1910.

== Species ==
Species within the genus Boettgeria include:

- Boettgeria crispa (Lowe, 1831)
- Boettgeria deltostoma (Lowe, 1831)
- Boettgeria depauperata (Lowe, 1831)
- Boettgeria exigua (Lowe, 1831)
- Boettgeria jensi Neubert & Groh, 1998
- Boettgeria lorenziana Groh & Hemmen, 1984
- Boettgeria lowei Groh & Hemmen, 1984
- Boettgeria obesiuscula (Lowe, 1863)
