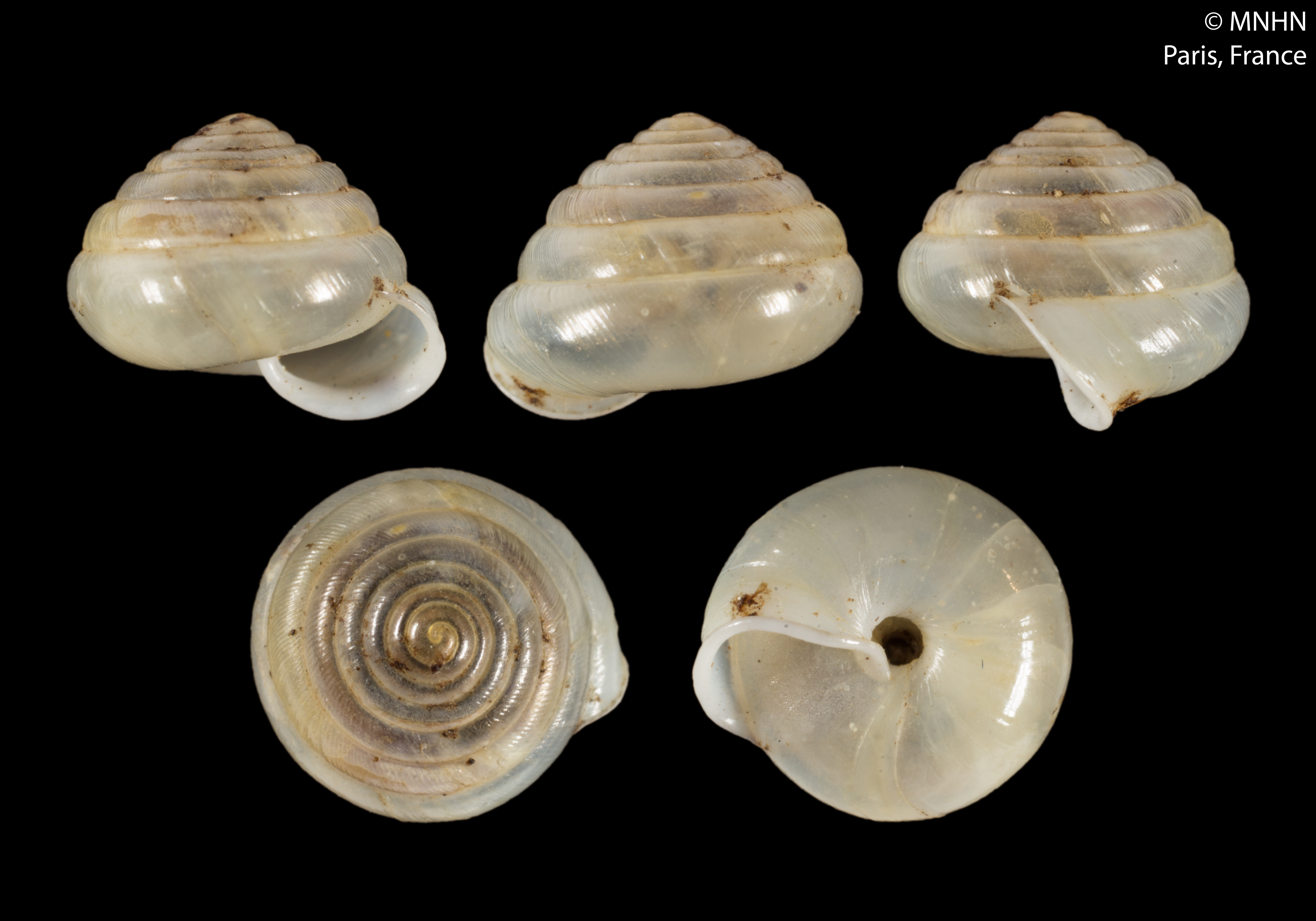
- Shell of Hypselartemon paivanus (MNHN-IM-2000-30973).jpeg (specimen at MNHN, Paris)

Scientific classification
- Kingdom: Animalia
- Phylum: Mollusca
- Class: Gastropoda
- Order: Stylommatophora
- Family: Streptaxidae
- Genus: Hypselartemon; Wenz, 1947

Type species
- Streptaxis alveus Dunker, 1845

= Hypselartemon =

Genus of gastropods

Hypselartemon is a genus of air-breathing land snails, terrestrial pulmonate gastropod mollusks in the family Streptaxidae.

== Distribution ==
The distribution of the genus Hypselartemon includes Brazil and Colombia.

== Species ==
Species within the genus Hypselartemon include:

- Hypselartemon alveus (Dunker, 1845)
- Hypselartemon contusulus (Férussac, 1827)
- Hypselartemon deshayesianus (Crosse, 1863)
- Hypselartemon paivanus (Pfeiffer, 1867)
