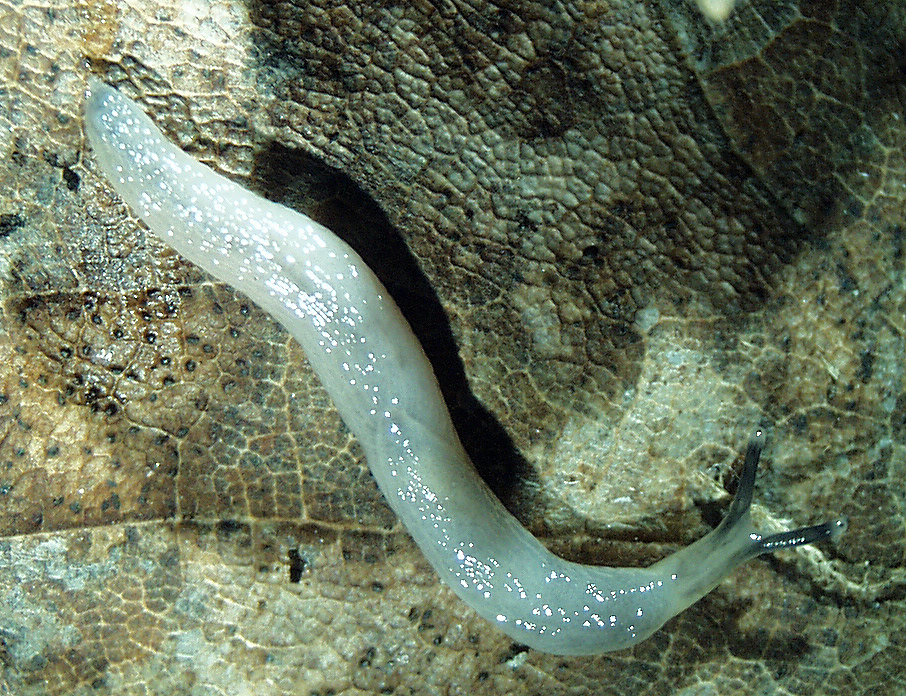

Conservation status
- Secure (NatureServe)

Scientific classification
- Kingdom: Animalia
- Phylum: Mollusca
- Class: Gastropoda
- Order: Stylommatophora
- Family: Boettgerillidae
- Genus: Boettgerilla
- Species: B. pallens

Binomial name
- Boettgerilla pallens Simroth, 1912

Synonyms
- Boettgerilla vermiformis Wiktor, 1959

= Boettgerilla pallens =

Species of gastropod

Boettgerilla pallens, common name the worm slug, is a European species of air-breathing land slug, a terrestrial pulmonate gastropod mollusk in the family Boettgerillidae.

== Distribution ==
The type locality of Boettgerilla pallens is Gudauta in Abkhazia.

The native distribution of Boettgerilla pallens is believed to be the SW flank of the Caucasus:

- Abkhazia
- western Georgia

Maybe it is also native to Armenia, the Crimean Mountains and Donetsk Upland in Ukraine.

But the species has spread spectacularly over the last half century. Dates of first recorded occurrences in various countries are listed in Reise et al. (2000). In Europe, Boettgerilla pallens was first found in 1949 (in Germany). It has now become naturalized in most of Europe although it has conspicuously not been reported from most of Spain, Italy and the Balkan Peninsula. Countries where it occurs include:

- Ireland - since 1973
- Great Britain - since 1972
- France
- Belgium
- Netherlands
- Germany
- Switzerland.
- Austria
- Czech Republic
- Slovakia
- Poland - since 1954, mainly in the south-western Poland
- Finland
- Sweden
- Lithuania
- Russia: Moscow, Saint Petersburg and other cities
- Spain (north only) and Andorra
- Italy (north only)
- Romania
- Slovenia – since 1994
- Serbia – since 2022
- North Macedonia – since 2024
- Bulgaria – since 1999
- Ukraine - Kyiv, Lviv, Ivano-Frankivsk, Vinnytsia, some cities of Crimea and others
- Iceland

Outside Europe it is also known, presumed as an introduction, from:

- Western Siberia (Russia)
- Tajikistan
- Turkey
- Canary Islands (Spain)
- Canada: British Columbia, Newfoundland, Quebec
- USA: California, Oregon
- Mexico
- Colombia

== Description ==
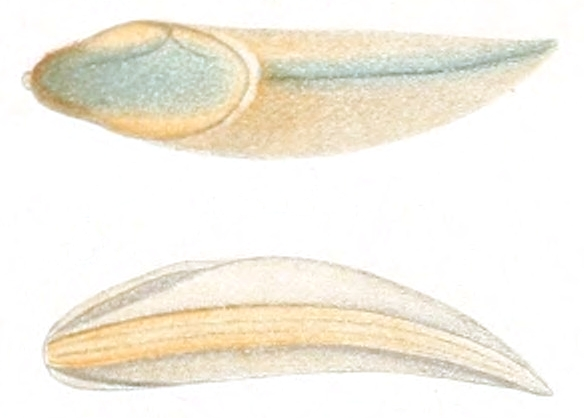
A 1912 drawing of a preserved specimen of Boettgerilla pallens from the original description by Heinrich Simroth

Boettgerilla pallens is very narrow and slender slug, almost worm-like and sharply keeled. The color is pale greyish or with bluish hue. The head and keel is slightly darker. The mantle is pointed at its posterior end and equipped with fine concentrical grooves. Sole is pale yellow. Mucus is colourless. Juveniles are yellowish to dirty white.

The body length is up to 60 mm. The width is up to 3 mm.

The shell is small, fragile, 1.5–3 x 0.8–1.5 mm, with median nucleus and growth lines, denser in the posterior part, no thin margin, located below the very terminal section of the pointed end of the mantle.

Reproductive system: Penis is elongate and broader than vagina, epiphallus and spermatheca. Epiphallus is swollen and connected to penis laterally near its posterior end, by a long thin duct, which is thinner than vas deferens. Vagina as long as penis and almost as narrow as vas deferens. There are no accessory glands. The spermatheca is elongate and relatively short.

Boettgerilla pallens is much more slender than Milax gagates. The sole is more slender. In Milax gagates the posterior end of the mantle is rounded, its shell is larger and better visible, its colour more yellowish-brownish.

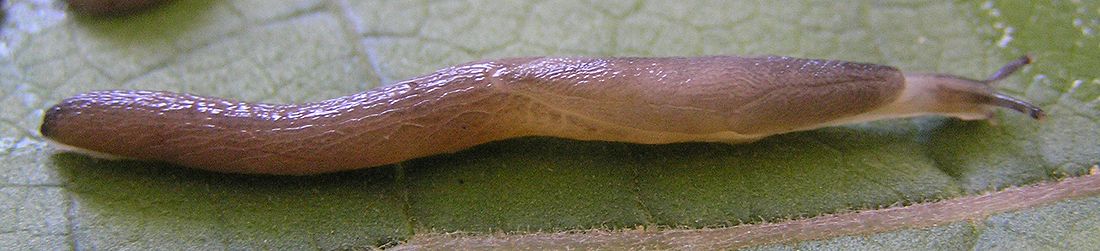
right side view of Boettgerilla pallens

== Ecology ==
Reise et al. (2000) review aspects of the distribution, mode of range expansion, and other aspects of its ecology.

Boettgerilla pallens inhabits a very wide range of habitats, including gardens, grassland, coniferous and deciduous woodland, and is tolerant of a wide range of soil pH, calcium content and water content. It lives at altitudes of up to 1750 m in the Caucasus and in Switzerland at up to 1600 m, but usually below 700 m. It can be considered as synanthropic, although it is now often found also in undisturbed habitats.

Although it may often been found under logs and stones, it is predominantly subterranean, adapted to moving through earthworm burrows and similar spaces in soil, 2–20 cm (maximum up to 60 cm) below surface. Snails move rapidly away from bright light sources.

Feeding is seldom intensive: slugs usually take a few bites (of earthworm faeces, detritus etc., also arionid eggs) and move on. Although often found in gardens and greenhouses, it has only rarely been considered a pest. One study reports it coming to the surface at night to predate snails.

Mating and egg-laying is during late summer and into autumn in Britain (October in Germany). Eggs are laid 9–27 cm below the surface as several clutches of 1–6 eggs . Adults survive egg-laying but die shortly afterwards. Juveniles hatch after 20–22 days at 17 °C (in Germany), between October and December (in Britain). Juveniles turn colour from white to grey in May–June.
