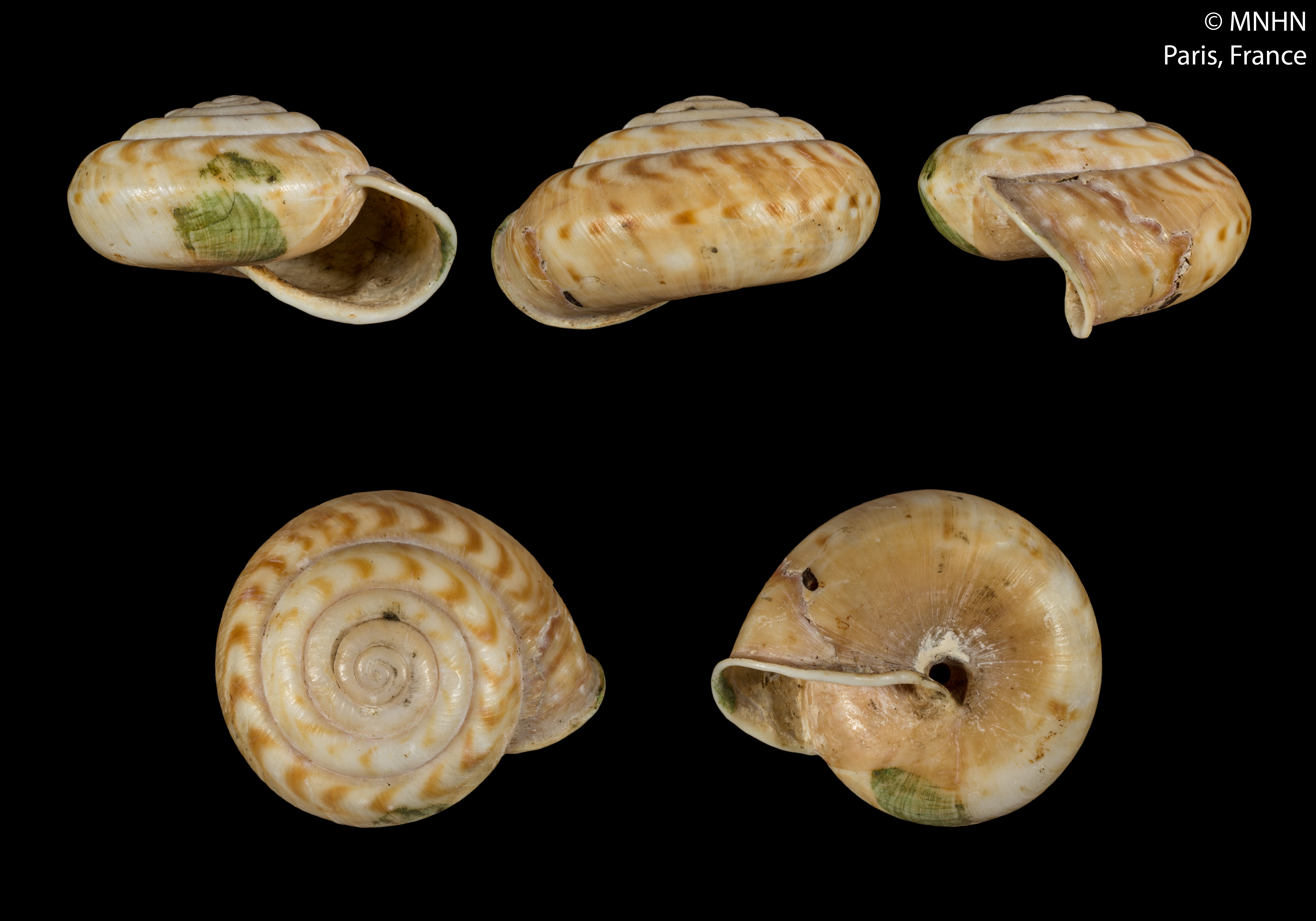
- Shell of Solaropsis pellisboae (syntype at MNHN, Paris)

Scientific classification
- Kingdom: Animalia
- Phylum: Mollusca
- Class: Gastropoda
- Order: Stylommatophora
- Suborder: Helicina
- Superfamily: Sagdoidea
- Family: Solaropsidae
- Genus: Solaropsis; Beck, 1837

Type species
- Helix pellisserpentis Gmelin, 1791

Synonyms
- Helix (Ophiospila) Ancey, 1887; Helix (Psadara) K. Miller, 1878 (original rank); Helix (Solaropsis) Beck, 1837 (original rank); Olympus Simone, 2010; Ophiodermis Agassiz, 1846; Ophiospila Ancey, 1887; Psadara K. Miller, 1878; Solarium Lamarck, 1799; Solaropsis (Eupsadara) Pilsbry, 1926· accepted, alternate representation; Solaropsis (Heliopsis) Pilsbry, 1933· accepted, alternate representation; Solaropsis (Psadara) K. Miller, 1878· accepted, alternate representation; Solaropsis (Psadariella) Weyrauch, 1956· accepted, alternate representation; Solaropsis (Solaropsis) H. Beck, 1837· accepted, alternate representation

= Solaropsis =

Genus of gastropods

Solaropsis, also known by the common name sundial snails or sun snails, is a genus of air-breathing land snails, terrestrial pulmonate gastropod mollusks in the family Solaropsidae.

== Distribution ==
Distribution of Solaropsis include:

Central America:

- Costa Rica

South America:

- Colombia
- Bolivia
- Guyana
- Brazil
- northeastern Argentina

== Species ==
Species within the genus Solaropsis include:

- Solaropsis alcobacensis Salvador & Simone, 2015
- Solaropsis amazonica (Pfeiffer, 1854)
- Solaropsis andicola L. Pfeiffer
- Solaropsis anguicula (Hupé, 1853)
- Solaropsis angulifera F. Haas, 1955
- Solaropsis anomala Pilsbry, 1957
- Solaropsis bachi Ihering, 1900
- Solaropsis brasiliana (Deshayes, 1831)
- Solaropsis caperata F. S. Silva, Mendes-Júnior & Simone, 2022
- Solaropsis castelnaudii (Hupé & Deville, 1850)
- Solaropsis catenifera L. Pfeiffer, 1854
- Solaropsis cearana (F. Baker, 1914)
- Solaropsis chicomendesi Cuezzo & I. Fernández, 2001
- Solaropsis cicatricata Beck, 1837
- Solaropsis cousini Jousseaume, 1887
- Solaropsis derbyi (Ihering, 1900)
- Solaropsis diplogonia (Dohrn, 1882)
- Solaropsis elaps Dohrn, 1882
- Solaropsis fairchildi Bequaert & Clench, 1938
- Solaropsis feisthameli (Hupé, 1853)
- Solaropsis gibboni (L. Pfeiffer, 1846)
- Solaropsis heliaca (d’Orbigny, 1835)
- Solaropsis incarum (Philippi, 1869)
- Solaropsis inornata Haas, 1951
- Solaropsis johnsoni Pilsbry, 1933
- Solaropsis juruana (Ihering, 1905)
- Solaropsis leopoldina (Strubel, 1895)
- Solaropsis marmatensis L. Pfeiffer
- Solaropsis monile (Broderip, 1832)
- Solaropsis monolacca (L. Pfeiffer, 1857)
- Solaropsis nimbus (Simone, 2010)
- Solaropsis nubeculata (Deshayes, 1831)
- Solaropsis palizae Weyrauch, 1956
- Solaropsis pascalia (Cailliaud, 1857)
- Solaropsis pellisboae (Hupé, 1853)
- Solaropsis penthesileae Salvador, 2021
- Solaropsis pilsbryi Ihering, 1900
- Solaropsis pizarro (Pilsbry, 1944)
- Solaropsis planior (Pilsbry, 1889)
- Solaropsis praestans L. Pfeiffer, 1854
- Solaropsis punctata (Wagner, 1827)
- Solaropsis rosarium (Pfeiffer, 1849)
- Solaropsis rugifera Dohrn, 1882
- Solaropsis selenostoma L. Pfeiffer, 1854
- Solaropsis serpens (Spix, 1827)
- Solaropsis tiloriensis (Angas, 1879)
- Solaropsis trigonostoma Haas, 1934
- Solaropsis undata (Lightfoot, 1786)
- Solaropsis undata F. Haas, 1966 (homonymy: a secondary junior homonym of Solaropsis undata ([Lightfoot], 1786). There is no recognized synonym or substitute name available, and a replacement name may be necessary if the species is confirmed to be valid).
- Solaropsis venezuelensis Preston, 1909
- Solaropsis vipera (Pfeiffer, 1859)

Species brought into synonymy

- Solaropsis catenulata (Ancey, 1890): synonym of Solaropsis marmatensis (L. Pfeiffer, 1855)
- * Solaropsis kuhni L. Pfeiffer: synonym of Solaropsis nubeculata (Deshayes, 1831)
- Solaropsis paravicinii Ancey, 1897: synonym of Solaropsis heliaca (d'Orbigny, 1835)
- Solaropsis pellisserpentis Chemnitz: synonym of Solaropsis undata ([Lightfoot], 1786)

== Ecology ==
Solaropsis lives in rain forests.

Solaropsis aff. fairchildi has been found to feed on flesh meat in the laboratory.
