= Dentellaria =

Scientific classification
- Kingdom: Animalia
- Phylum: Mollusca
- Class: Gastropoda
- Order: Stylommatophora
- Infraorder: Helicoidei
- Superfamily: Helicoidea
- Family: Pleurodontidae
- Genus: Dentellaria; Schumacher, 1817

Type species
- Helix sinuata O. F. Müller, 1774

Synonyms
- Helix (Dentellaria) Schumacher, 1817; Pleurodonte (Dentellaria) Schumacher, 1817

Genus of gastropods

Dentellaria is a genus of air-breathing land snails, terrestrial pulmonate gastropod mollusks in the family Pleurodontidae.

== Species ==
Species within the genus Dentellaria include:

- Dentellaria amabilis (C. B. Adams, 1850)
- Dentellaria anomala (Pfeiffer, 1849)
- Dentellaria atavus (Pfeiffer, 1859)
- Dentellaria bronni (L. Pfeiffer, 1846)
- Dentellaria candescens (C. B. Adams, 1850)
- Dentellaria cara (C. B. Adams, 1849)
- Dentellaria catadupae (H. B. Baker, 1935)
- Dentellaria invalida (C. B. Adams, 1850)
- Dentellaria okeniana (L. Pfeiffer, 1845)
- Dentellaria pallescens (C. B. Adams, 1851)
- Dentellaria peracutissima (C. B. Adams, 1845)
- Dentellaria perplexa (Férussac, 1832)
- Dentellaria picturata (C. B. Adams, 1849)
- Dentellaria schroeteriana (L. Pfeiffer, 1845)
- Dentellaria simson (Pfeiffer, 1852)
- Dentellaria sinuata (O. F. Müller, 1774)
- Dentellaria sloaneana (Pfeiffer, 1868)
- Dentellaria strangulata (C. B. Adams, 1849)
- Dentellaria tridentina (Férussac, 1832)
- Dentellaria valida (C. B. Adams, 1850)

Synonyms

- Dentellaria pachygastra (Gray, 1834): synonym of Pleurodonte pachygastra (Gray, 1834)
- Dentellaria tridentula Miller, 1878: synonym of Isomeria bituberculata (L. Pfeiffer, 1853): synonym of Isomeria bourcieri (Reeve, 1852) (junior synonym)
- Dentellaria latidentata Miller, 1878: synonym of Isomeria bituberculata (L. Pfeiffer, 1853): synonym of Isomeria bourcieri (Reeve, 1852) (junior synonym)
