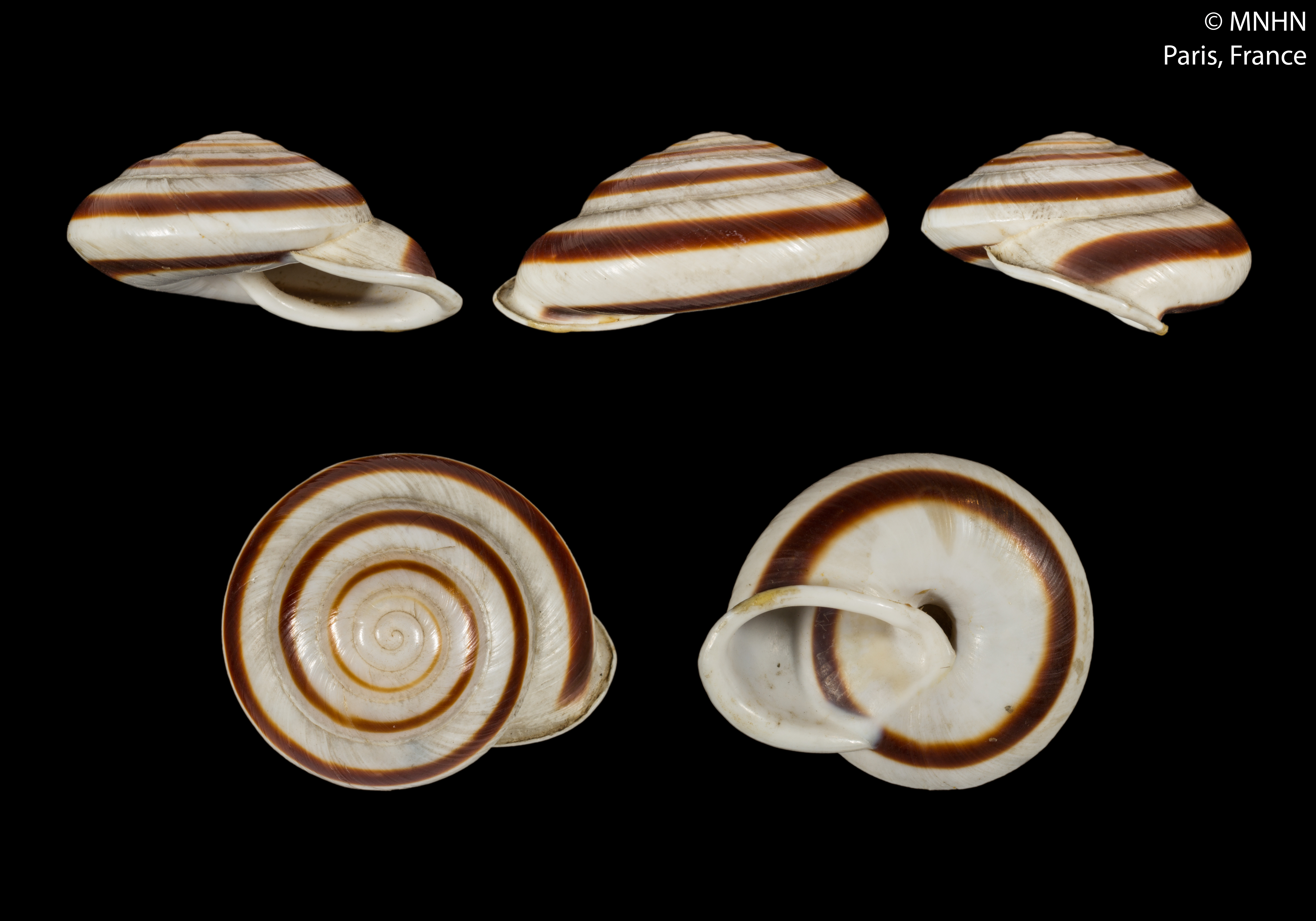
- Shell of Caracolus bizonalis (syntype at MNHN, Paris)

Scientific classification
- Kingdom: Animalia
- Phylum: Mollusca
- Class: Gastropoda
- Order: Stylommatophora
- Suborder: Helicina
- Superfamily: Sagdoidea
- Family: Solaropsidae; H. Nordsieck, 1986

Type genus
- Solaropsis H. Beck, 1837

Genera
- See text

= Solaropsidae =

Family of gastropods

Solaropsidae is a family of air-breathing land snails, terrestrial pulmonate gastropod mollusks in the superfamily Sagdoidea.

== Genera ==
Subfamily Caracolinae Cuezzo, 2003

- Caracolus Montfort, 1810

Subfamily Solaropsinae H. Nordsieck, 1986

- Solaropsis H. Beck, 1837

Genera brought into synonymy

- Caracolla Albers, 1850: synonym of Caracolus Montfort, 1810 (invalid: incorrect subsequent spelling)
- Carocolla Gray, 1825: synonym of Caracolus Montfort, 1810 (incorrect subsequent spelling or emendation)
- Corocolla auct.: synonym of Caracolus Montfort, 1810 (incorrect subsequent spelling)
- Discodoma Swainson, 1840: synonym of Caracolus Montfort, 1810
- Serpentulus H. Adams & A. Adams, 1855: synonym of Caracolus Montfort, 1810
- Vortex Oken, 1815: synonym of Caracolus Montfort, 1810 (Not available name: Published in a work placed on the Official Index by Opinion 417)
- Wurtzorbis Webb, 1970: synonym of Caracolus Montfort, 1810
- Olympus Simone, 2010: synonym of Solaropsis H. Beck, 1837
- Ophidermis Agassiz, 1846: synonym of Solaropsis H. Beck, 1837
- Psadara K. Miller, 1878: synonym of Solaropsis (Psadara) K. Miller, 1878 represented as Solaropsis H. Beck, 1837
- Solarium Spix, 1827: synonym of Solaropsis H. Beck, 1837
