= Boettgeria crispa =

Conservation status
- Endangered (IUCN 3.1)

Scientific classification
- Kingdom: Animalia
- Phylum: Mollusca
- Class: Gastropoda
- Order: Stylommatophora
- Family: Clausiliidae
- Genus: Boettgeria
- Species: B. crispa

Binomial name
- Boettgeria crispa (Lowe, 1831)

Species of gastropod

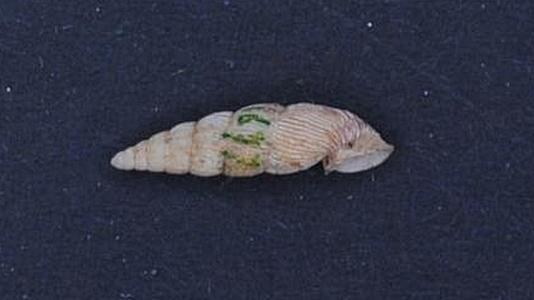

Boettgeria crispa is a species of small, very elongate, air-breathing land snails, terrestrial pulmonate gastropod mollusks in the family Clausiliidae, the door snails, all of which have a clausilium.

This species is endemic to Portugal. Its natural habitat is temperate forests. It is threatened by habitat loss.
