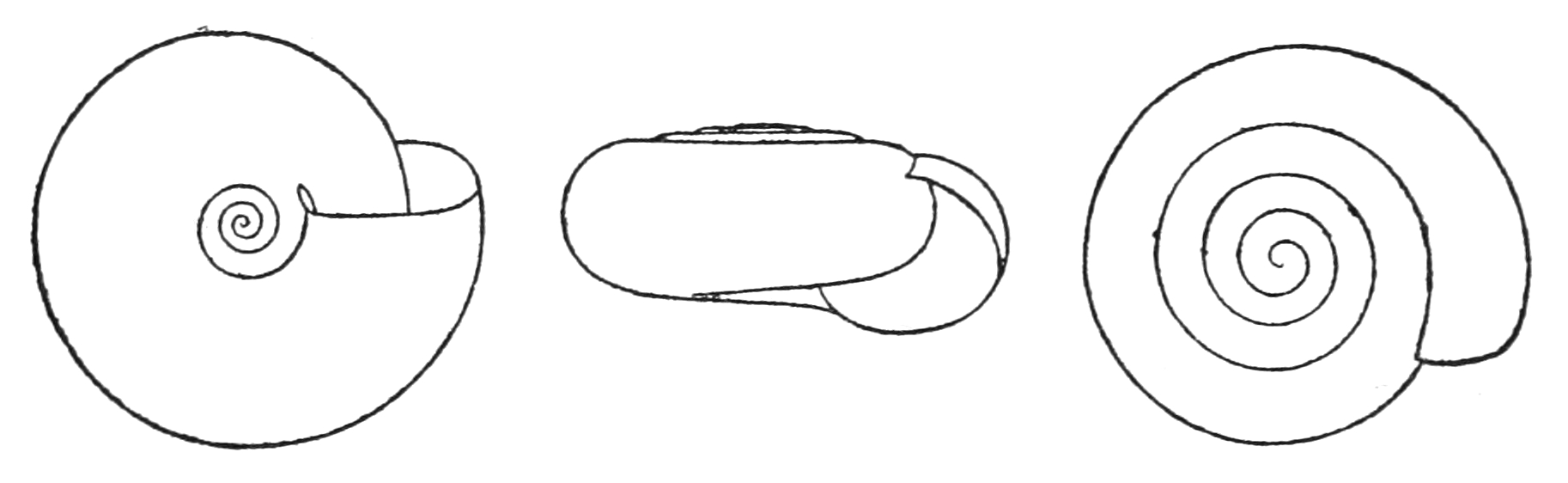
- Three views of a shell of Microphysula cookei

Scientific classification
- Kingdom: Animalia
- Phylum: Mollusca
- Class: Gastropoda
- Order: Stylommatophora
- Suborder: Helicina
- Infraorder: Helicoidei
- Superfamily: Helicoidea
- Family: Thysanophoridae; Pilsbry, 1926

Genera
- See text

= Thysanophoridae =

Family of gastropods

Thysanophoridae is a family of air-breathing land snails, terrestrial pulmonate gastropod molluscs in the superfamily Helicoidea (according to the taxonomy of the Gastropoda by Bouchet & Rocroi, 2005).

These are common woodland snails of North America. They also occur in a few recorded spots in South America.

This family is defined by the absence of both a diverticulum and a stimulatory organ.

== Subfamilies ==
There are no subfamilies in Thysanophoridae.

== Genera ==
Genera within the family Thysanophoridae include:

- Hojeda H. B. Baker, 1926
- Itzamna (unconfirmed)
- Lyroconus (unconfirmed)
- Mcleania (unconfirmed)
- Microconus (unconfirmed)
- Microphysula Cockerell, 1926 - Spruce snails
- Miroconus (unconfirmed)
- Pulchriconus (unconfirmed)
- Setidiscus (unconfirmed)
- Suavitas (unconfirmed)
- Thysanophora Strebel & Pfeffer, 1880 - the type genus
