= Thysanophora =

Scientific classification
- Kingdom: Animalia
- Phylum: Mollusca
- Class: Gastropoda
- Order: Stylommatophora
- Family: Thysanophoridae
- Genus: Thysanophora; Strebel & Pfeffer, 1879

Genus of land snails

Thysanophora is a genus of gastropods belonging to the family Thysanophoridae.

The species of this genus are found in America.

Species:

- Thysanophora alta Bartsch, 1932
- Thysanophora amita Pilsbry, 1926
- Thysanophora balboa Pilsbry, 1926
- Thysanophora beatensis Bartsch, 1932
- Thysanophora canalis Pilsbry, 1910
- Thysanophora clarionensis Dall, 1926
- Thysanophora conspurcatella (Morelet, 1851)
- Thysanophora costaricensis Rehder, 1942
- Thysanophora impura (L.Pfeiffer, 1866)
- Thysanophora incrustata (Poey, 1853)
- Thysanophora ingersolli
- Thysanophora jaliscoensis Pilsbry, 1926
- Thysanophora materna Dall, 1926
- Thysanophora meermani Dourson, Caldwell & Dourson, 2018
- Thysanophora plagioptycha (Shuttleworth, 1854)
- Thysanophora proxima Pilsbry, 1899
- Thysanophora pruinosa (L.Pfeiffer, 1852)
- Thysanophora rojasi (Jousseaume, 1889)
- Thysanophora santanaensis (L.Pfeiffer, 1855)
- Thysanophora venezuelensis (Jousseaume, 1889)
