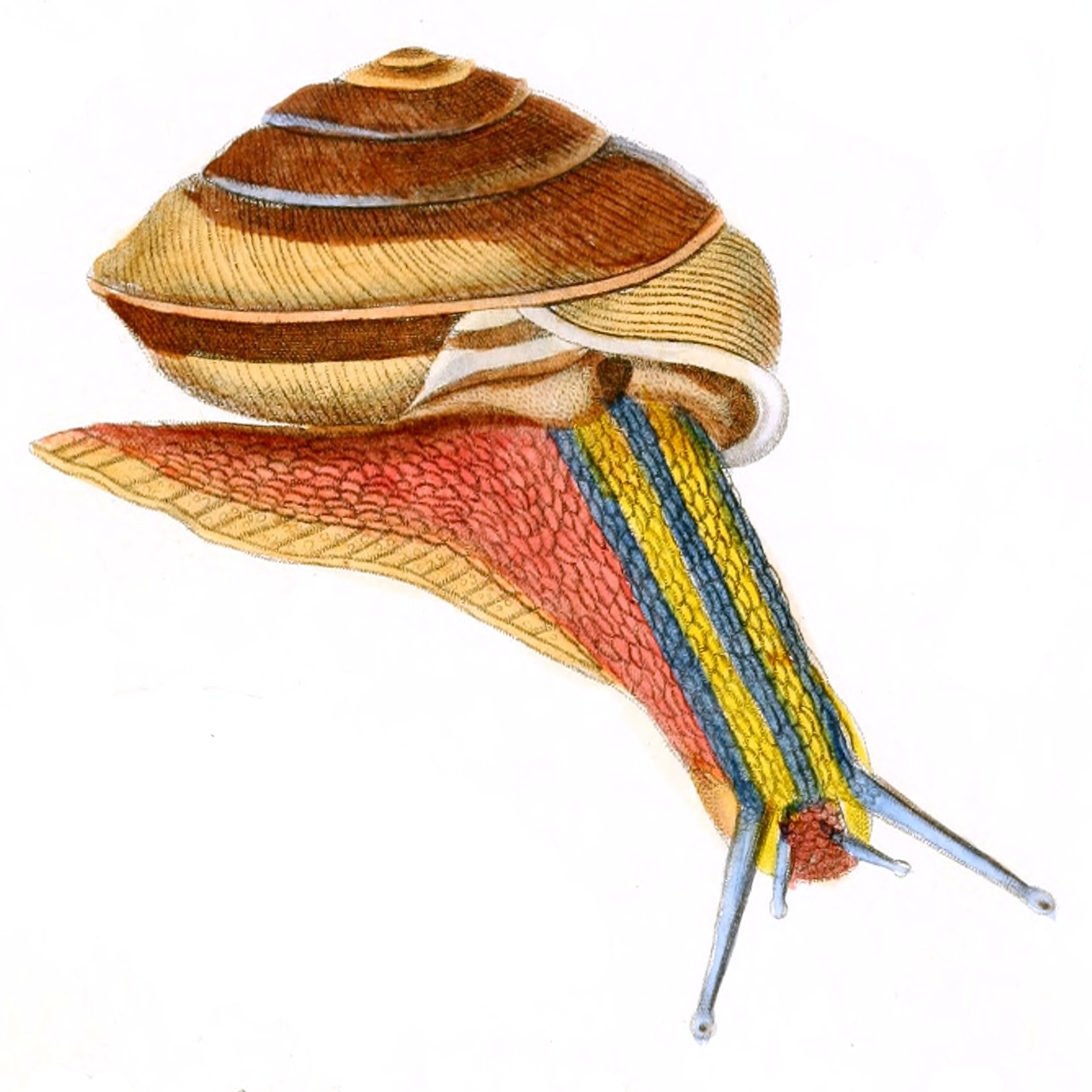
- 1868 painting of Lucerna bainbridgii

Scientific classification
- Kingdom: Animalia
- Phylum: Mollusca
- Class: Gastropoda
- Order: Stylommatophora
- Family: Pleurodontidae
- Genus: Lucerna
- Species: L. bainbridgii

Binomial name
- Lucerna bainbridgii (Pfeiffer, 1845)

Synonyms
- Helix bainbridgei var. pretiosa C. B. Adams, 1851 [non Albers, 1850]; Helix spengleriana Pfeiffer, 1847 (taxon inquirendum); Pleurodonte bainbridgii (L. Pfeiffer, 1845)

= Lucerna bainbridgii =

Species of gastropod

Lucerna bainbridgii is a species of air-breathing land snail, a terrestrial pulmonate gastropod mollusk in the family Pleurodontidae.

This species occurs in Jamaica.
