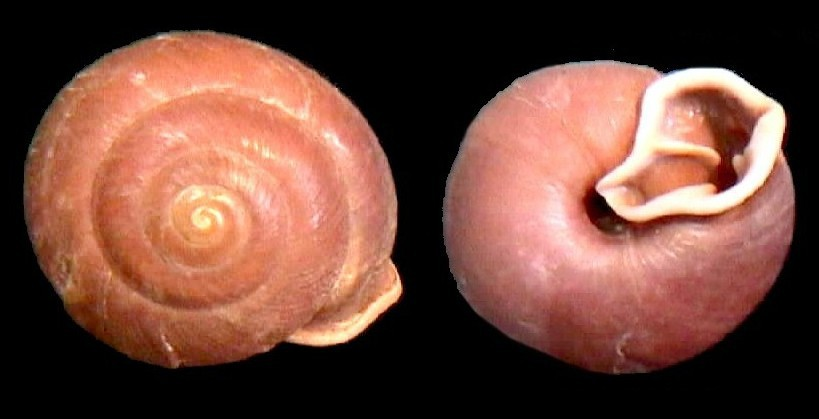
- Two shells of Labyrinthus plicatus

Scientific classification
- Kingdom: Animalia
- Phylum: Mollusca
- Class: Gastropoda
- Order: Stylommatophora
- Infraorder: Helicoidei
- Superfamily: Helicoidea
- Family: Labyrinthidae
- Genus: Labyrinthus; Beck, 1837

Synonyms
- Ambages Gude, 1912 (junior synonym); Helix (Labyrinthus) Beck, 1837; Labyrinthus (Ambages) Gude, 1912 (junior synonym); Labyrinthus (Labyrinthus) H. Beck, 1837· accepted, alternate representation; Lampadion Röding, 1798; Lyrostoma Swainson, 1840; Pleurodonte (Labyrinthus) H. Beck, 1837 (unaccepted rank)

= Labyrinthus =

Genus of gastropods

Labyrinthus is a genus of air-breathing land snails, terrestrial pulmonate gastropod mollusks in the family Labyrinthidae.

== Distribution ==
This genus occurs in South America.

== Species ==
Species within the genus Labyrinthus include:

- Labyrinthus bifurcatus (Deshayes, 1838)
- Labyrinthus chiriquensis / Lampadion chiriquensis (Pilsbry, 1899)
- Labyrinthus cymatodes / Lampadion cymatodes (Pfeiffer, 1852)
- Labyrinthus furcillatus (Hupé, 1853)
- Labyrinthus labyrinthus “Chemnitz” Deshayes (Cheminitz, 1795)
- Labyrinthus leprieurii (Petit, 1840)
- Labyrinthus leucodon (Pfeiffer, 1847)
- Labyrinthus manueli Higgins, 1872
- Labyrinthus oreas Koch
- Labyrinthus otis (Lightfoot, 1786)
- Labyrinthus orthorinus Pilsbry, 1899
- Labyrinthus plicatus (Born, 1780) / Labyrinthus plicata (Born, 1778)
- Labyrinthus raimondii (Philippi, 1867)
- Labyrinthus tamsiana (Dunker, 1847)
- Labyrinthus tarapotensis (Moricand, 1858)
- Labyrinthus umbrus Thompson, 1957
- Labyrinthus uncigera (Petit, 1838)
- Labyrinthus yatesi (Pfeiffer, 1855)
- Labyrinthus vexans Dohrn
- Labyrinthus yatesi (Pfeiffer, 1855)
