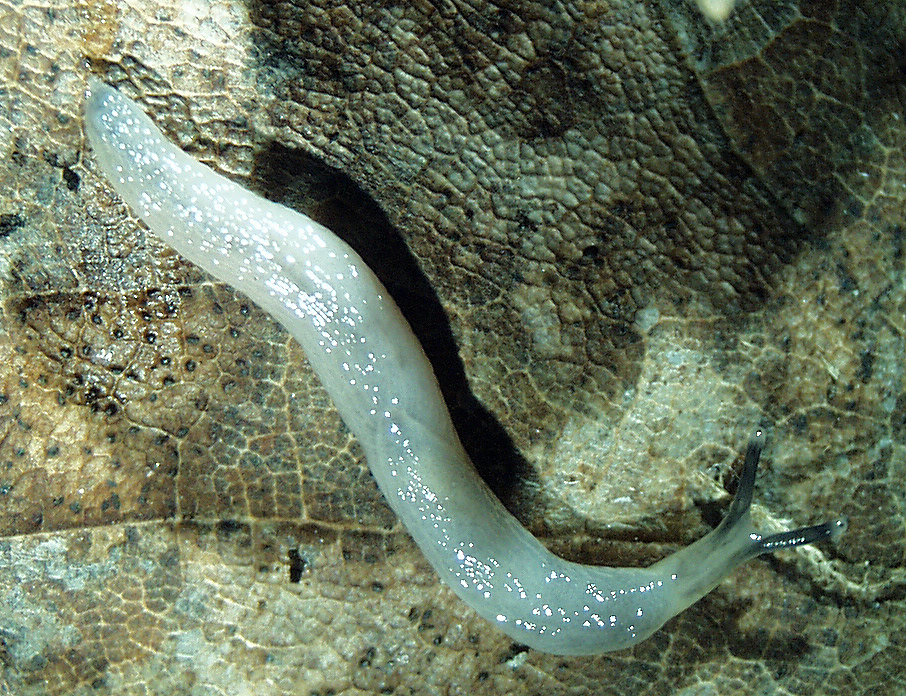
- Boettgerilla pallens

Scientific classification
- Kingdom: Animalia
- Phylum: Mollusca
- Class: Gastropoda
- Order: Stylommatophora
- Suborder: Helicina
- Infraorder: Limacoidei
- Superfamily: Limacoidea
- Family: Boettgerillidae; Wiktor & I. M. Likharev, 1979
- Genus: Boettgerilla; Simroth, 1910

= Boettgerilla =

Genus of gastropods

Boettgerilla is a genus of air-breathing land slugs, terrestrial pulmonate gastropod molluscs in the family Boettgerillidae.

The generic name Boettgerilla is named after the German malacologist Oskar Boettger.

== Taxonomy ==
Boettgerilla is the only genus in the family Boettgerillidae. This family has no subfamilies (according to the taxonomy of the Gastropoda by Bouchet & Rocroi, 2005).

Boettgerillidae Van Goethem, 1972 is not an available name, because it has no diagnosis.

== Distribution ==
Distribution of Boettgerillidae include western Palearctic.

== Species ==
There are two species in the genus Boettgerilla and they include:

- Boettgerilla compressa Simroth, 1910 - type species
- Boettgerilla pallens Simroth, 1912

== Cladogram ==
A cladogram showing the phylogenic relationships of this family to other families within the limacoid clade:

- limacoid clade
  - Staffordioidea
    Staffordiidae
  - - - Dyakioidea
        Dyakiidae
      - Gastrodontoidea
        - Pristilomatidae
        - - Chronidae
          - - Euconulidae
            - Trochomorphidae
          - - Gastrodontidae
            - Oxychilidae
    - - Parmacelloidea
        - Trigonochlamydidae
        - Parmacellidae
        - Milacidae
      - - - Zonitoidea
            Zonitidae
          - Helicarionoidea
            - Helicarionidae
            - - Ariophantidae
              - Urocyclidae
        - Limacoidea
          - Vitrinidae
          - - Boettgerillidae
            - - Limacidae
              - Agriolimacidae

== See also ==
This genus of slugs should not be confused with a genus of door snails that has a similar name: Boettgeria. Both genera were named in honor of Caesar Rudolf Boettger.
