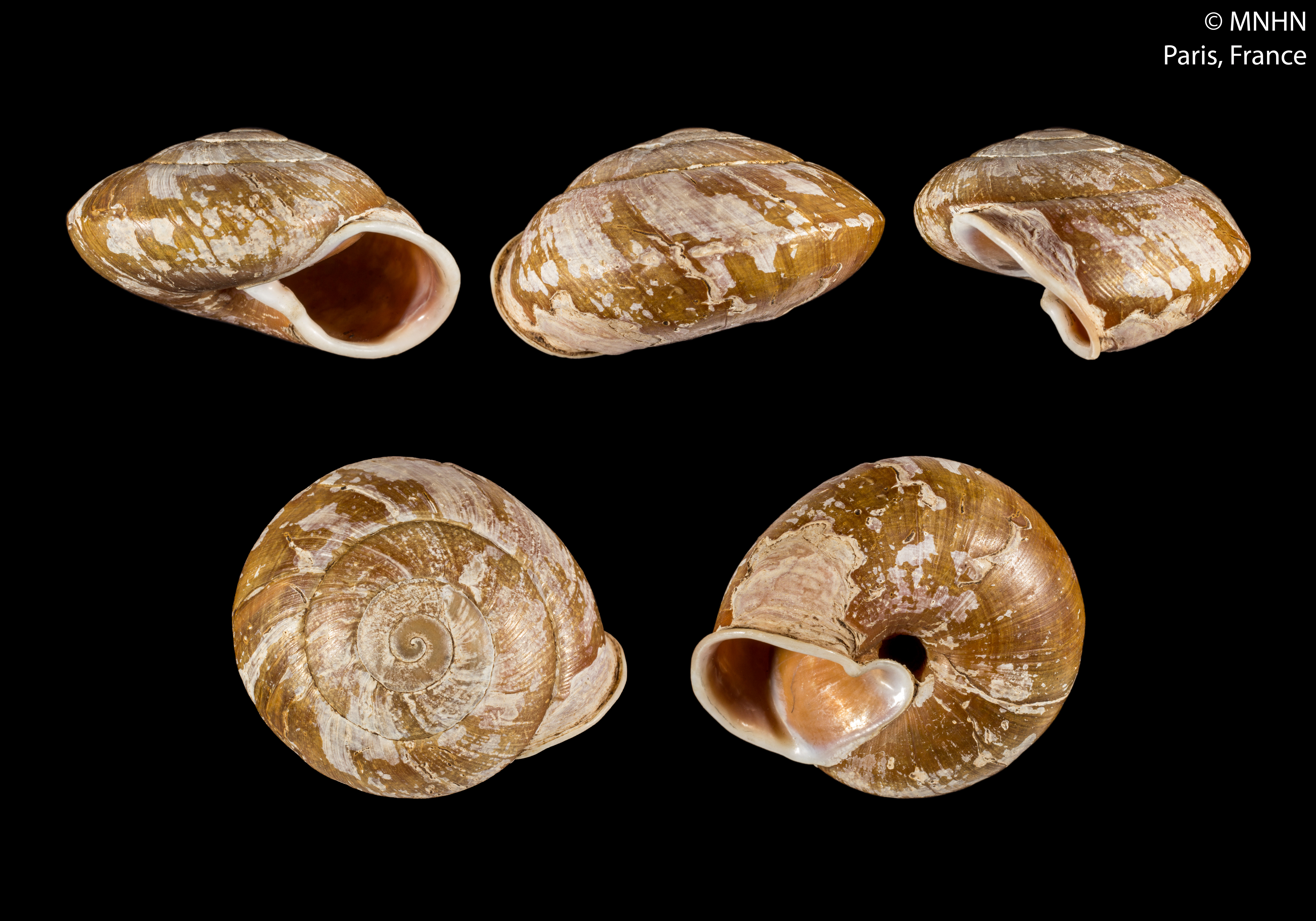
- Shell of Isomeria aloagana (syntype at MNHN, Paris)

Scientific classification
- Kingdom: Animalia
- Phylum: Mollusca
- Class: Gastropoda
- Order: Stylommatophora
- Infraorder: Helicoidei
- Superfamily: Helicoidea
- Family: Labyrinthidae
- Genus: Isomeria; Albers, 1850

Type species
- Helix oreas Koch, 1844

Synonyms
- Helix (Isomeria) Albers, 1850 (original rank); Labyrinthus (Isomeria) Albers, 1850

= Isomeria =

Genus of gastropods

Isomeria is a genus of air-breathing land snails, terrestrial pulmonate gastropod mollusks in the family Labyrinthidae.

== Species ==
Species within the genus Isomeria include:

- Isomeria aequatoria (L. Pfeiffer, 1860)
- Isomeria aequatoriana (Hidalgo, 1867)
- Isomeria aloagana Jouseaume, 1887
- Isomeria anadonta Pilsbry, 1949
- Isomeria basidens (Mousson, 1873)
- Isomeria bituberculata (Reeve, 1852)
- Isomeria bourcieri (Reeve, 1852)
- Isomeria continua (Reeve, 1854)
- Isomeria cymatodes (L. Pfeiffer, 1852)
- Isomeria equestrata (J. Moricand, 1858)
- Isomeria fordiana (Pilsbry, 1889)
- Isomeria gealei (E.A. Smith, 1877)
- Isomeria globosa (Broderip, 1832)
- Isomeria goettingi F. J. Borrero, 2012
- Isomeria hartwegi (L. Pfeiffer, 1846)
- Isomeria inexpectata Solem, 1966
- Isomeria jacksoni Solem, 1966
- Isomeria juno (L. Pfeiffer, 1850)
- Isomeria kolbergi Miller, 1878
- Isomeria medemi Solem, 1966
- Isomeria meobambensis (L. Pfeiffer, 1857)
- Isomeria meyeri (Kobelt, 1894)
- Isomeria minuta Solem, 1966
- Isomeria morula (Hidalgo, 1870)
- Isomeria neogranadensis (L. Pfeiffer, 1845)
- Isomeria oreas (Koch, 1844)
- Isomeria scalena (Martens, 1881)
- Isomeria stoltzmanni (Lubomirski, 1879)
- Isomeria subelliptica (Mousson, 1869)
- Isomeria triodonta (d'Orbigny, 1835)

Species brought into synonymy

- Isomeria anestia Pilsbry, 1949: synonym of Isomeria meobambensis (L. Pfeiffer, 1857) (junior synonym)
- Isomeria bifurcata (Deshayes, 1838): synonym of Labyrinthus bifurcatus (Deshayes, 1838) (superseded combination)
- Isomeria bituberculata (L. Pfeiffer, 1853) : synonym of Isomeria bourcieri (Reeve, 1852) (based on an unavailable original name)
- Isomeria bourcieri (L. Pfeiffer, 1853) : synonym of Isomeria bituberculata (Reeve, 1852) (combination based on an unavailable original name)
- Isomeria granulatissima Miller, 1878 : synonym of Isomeria kolbergi Miller, 1878 (junior synonym)
- Isomeria parietidentata Miller, 1878 : synonym of Isomeria cymatodes (L. Pfeiffer, 1852) (junior synonym)
- Isomeria subcastanea (L. Pfeiffer, 1842) : synonym of Isomeria globosa (Broderip, 1832) (junior synonym)
