= List of non-marine molluscs of Jamaica =

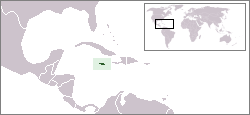
Location of Jamaica

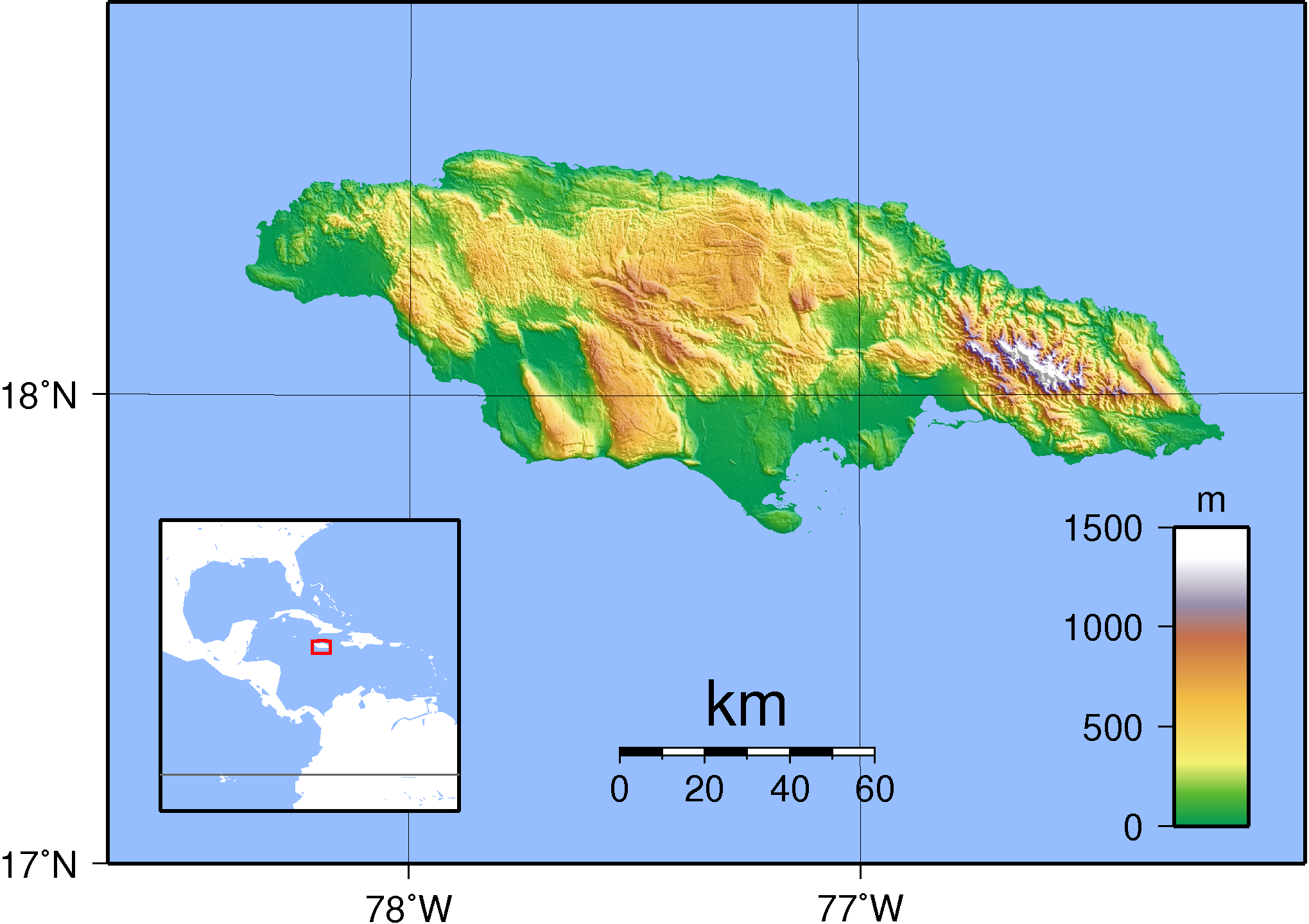
Topography of Jamaica

The non-marine molluscs of Jamaica are a part of the molluscan fauna of Jamaica. A large number of species of non-marine molluscs are found in the wild in the Caribbean island of Jamaica.

Land gastropods have a large degree of endemism in 90% of the species. 505 species of land gastropods are endemic to Jamaica.

== Land gastropods ==
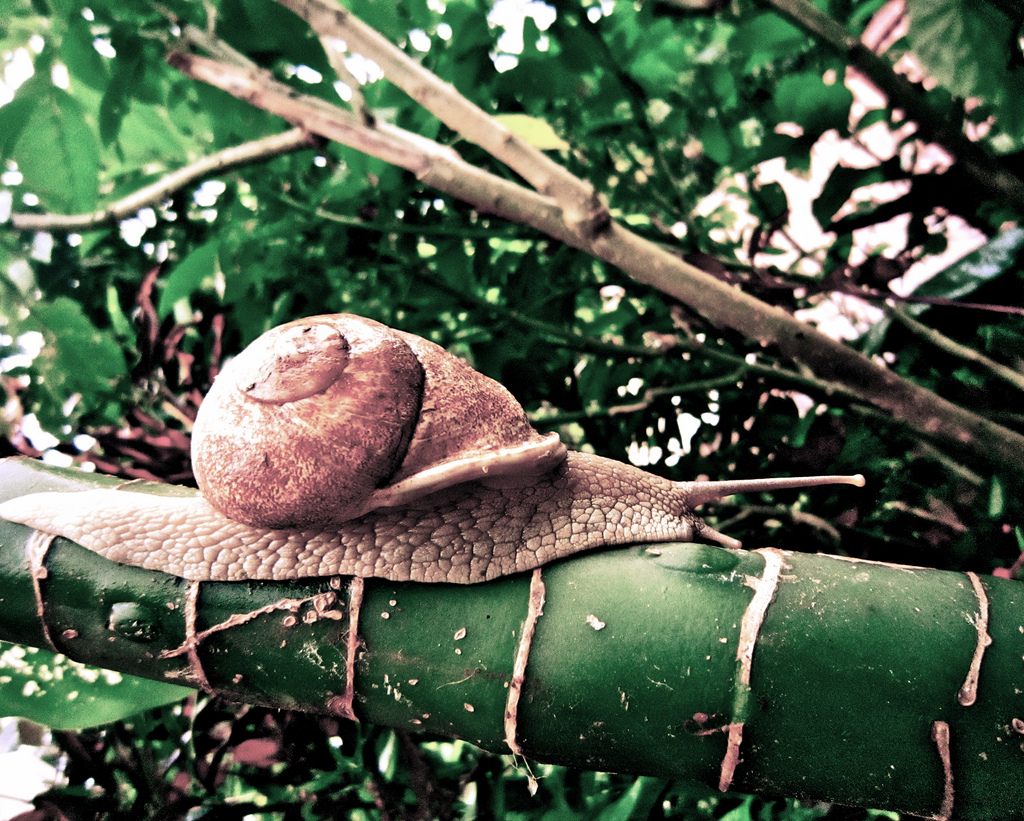
An unidentified land snail from Jamaica

Pleurodontidae

- Pleurodonte amabilis
- Pleurodonte catadupae
- Pleurodonte candescens

== See also ==
- List of marine molluscs of Jamaica

Lists of molluscs of surrounding countries:

- List of non-marine molluscs of Cuba
- List of non-marine molluscs of Haiti
- List of non-marine molluscs of the Dominican Republic
