= Labyrinthidae =

Scientific classification
- Kingdom: Animalia
- Phylum: Mollusca
- Class: Gastropoda
- Order: Stylommatophora
- Suborder: Helicina
- Infraorder: Helicoidei
- Superfamily: Helicoidea
- Family: Labyrinthidae; Borrero, Sei, D. G. Robinson & Rosenberg, 2017

Synonyms
- Lampadiidae Winckworth, 1945 (unavailable name: no description)

Family of gastropods

Labyrinthidae is a family of air-breathing land snails, terrestrial pulmonate gastropod mollusks in the superfamily Helicoidea.

== Genera ==
- Isomeria Albers, 1850
- Labyrinthus H. Beck, 1837

Genera brought into synonymy

- Ambages Gude, 1912 : synonym of Labyrinthus H. Beck, 1837 (junior synonym)
- Lampadion Röding, 1798 : synonym of Labyrinthus H. Beck, 1837
- Lyrostoma Swainson, 1840 : synonym of Labyrinthus H. Beck, 1837
