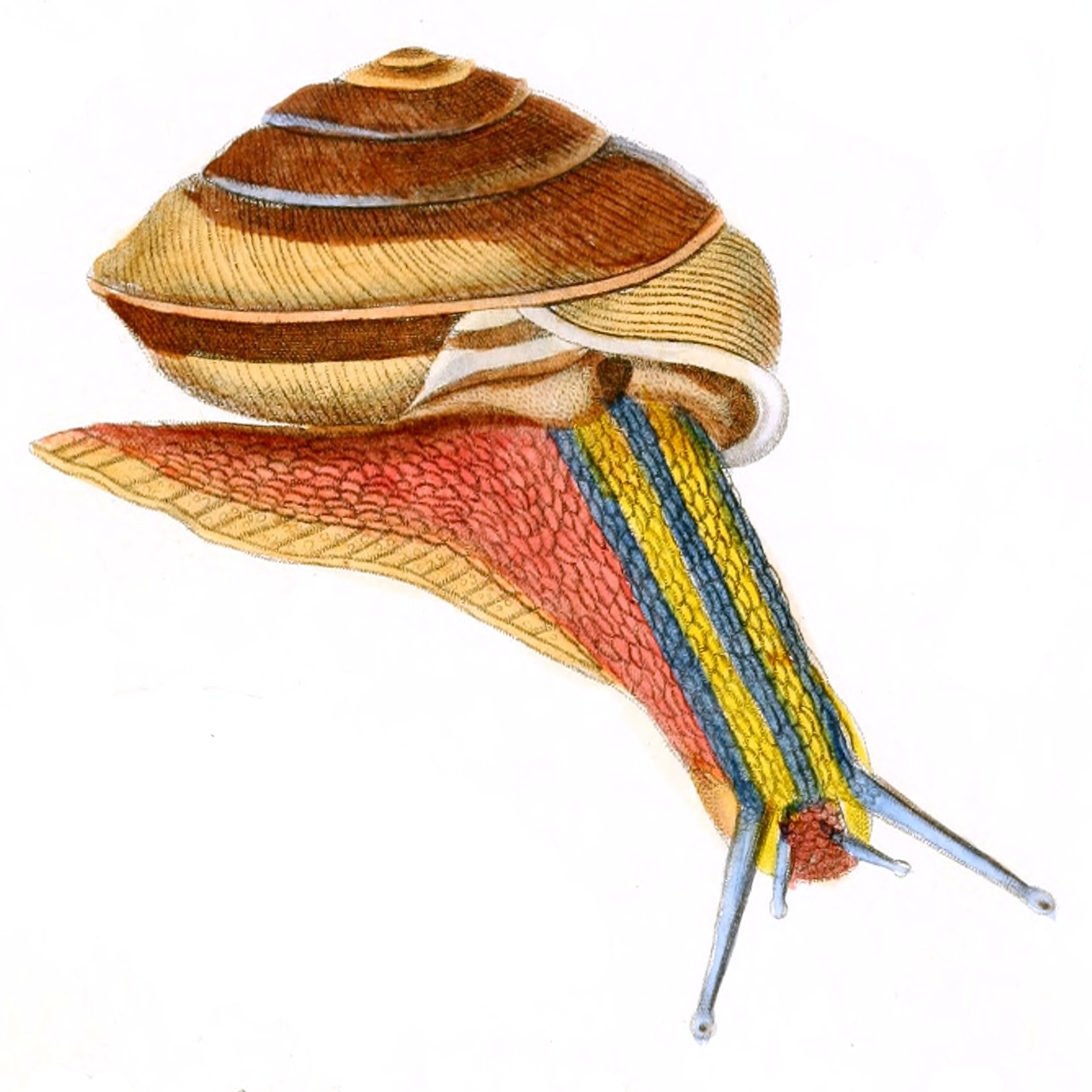
- 1868 painting of Pleurodonte bainbridgii

Scientific classification
- Kingdom: Animalia
- Phylum: Mollusca
- Class: Gastropoda
- Order: Stylommatophora
- Suborder: Helicina
- Infraorder: Helicoidei
- Superfamily: Helicoidea
- Family: Pleurodontidae; H. von Ihering, 1912

Synonyms
- Lucerninae Swainson, 1840; Lampadiidae Winckworth, 1945; Solaropsidae H. Nordsieck, 1986; Caracolinae Cuezzo, 2003

= Pleurodontidae =

Family of gastropods

Pleurodontidae is a family of air-breathing land snails, terrestrial pulmonate gastropod mollusks in the superfamily Helicoidea.

The family is classified within the order Stylommatophora, in the superorder Eupulmonata (according to the taxonomy of the Gastropoda by Bouchet & Rocroi, 2005). This family has no subfamilies.

The family Pleurodontidae includes some American taxa that used to be included within the Australasian family Camaenidae, a taxon whose monophyly was in doubt.

== Anatomy ==
Pleurodontids are defined by a missing diverticulum. The stimulatory organ is likewise absent.

== Genera ==
Genera within this family include:

- Coloniconcha Pilsbry, 1933 - with the only species Coloniconcha prima Pilsbry, 1933
- Dentellaria Schumacher, 1817 - either separate genus (with a synonym: Lucerna) or as a synonym of Pleurodonte
- Discolepis Ancey, 1904
- Eurycratera Beck, 1837
  - Eurycratera jamaicensis (Gmelin, 1791)
- † Ganeselloides Yen, 1969
- Gonostomopsis Pilsbry, 1889
- Lucerna Swainson, 1840
- Pleurodonte Fischer de Waldheim, 1807
- Thelidomus Swainson, 1840 (or in Camaenidae)
