= List of non-marine molluscs of El Hatillo Municipality, Miranda, Venezuela =

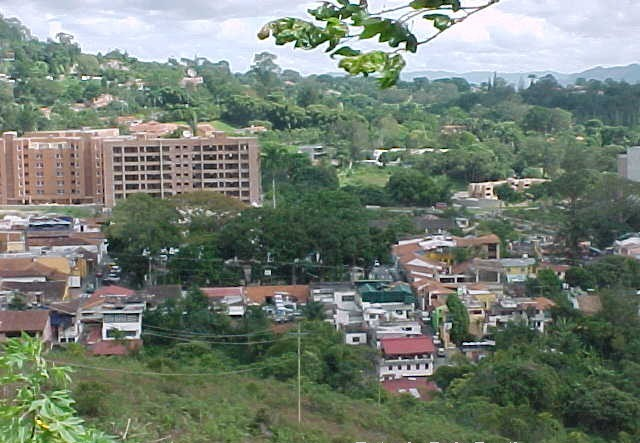
The urban area: El Hatillo Town

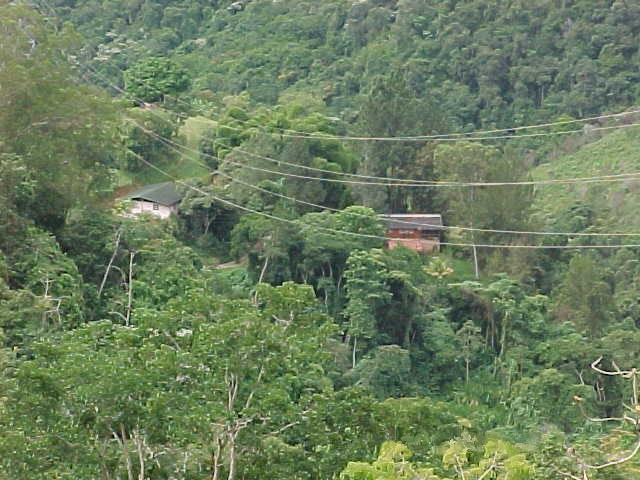
The rural area of La Mata

This partial list of non-marine molluscs of El Hatillo Municipality, Miranda, Venezuela shows that El Hatillo Municipality has a rich mollusc fauna. The municipality is land-locked, therefore there are no saltwater molluscs.

This list currently (2011) includes only terrestrial gastropods, in other words land slugs and land snails; whether there are any freshwater species of snails and clams is not yet recorded. The terrestrial mollusc fauna contains 38 species that have been reported in the specialized literature and by observation in the territories of the municipality.

El Hatillo Municipality consists of urban and rural areas:

- The urban areas are: El Hatillo town, El Calvario, La Lagunita, Alto Hatillo La Boyera, Las Marías, Oripoto, Los Pomelos, Los Naranjos, Los Geranios, La Cabaña, Cerro Verde, Llano Verde, Colinas, Vista El Valle, and Los Olivos y El Cigarral.
- The rural areas are: La Unión, Corralito, Turgua, La Hoyadita, Sabaneta, La Mata, Caicaguana, and Los Naranjos y Altos de Halcón.

== Gastropods ==
Family Helicinidae

- genus Helicina
  - Helicina spp.

Family Ampullariidae

- genus Marisa
  - Marisa cornuarietis Linnaeus, 1858
- genus Pomacea
  - Pomacea glauca Linnaeus, 1856
  - Pomacea bridgesii (Reeve, 1856) - introduced
  - Pomacea canaliculata (Lamarck, 1819) - introduced
  - Pomacea haustrum (Revee, 1856) - introduced

Family Neocyclotidae

- genus Poteria
  - Poteria fasciatum (Kobelt & Schwanheim, 1912)
  - Poteria translucida (Sowerby 1843)

Family Pachychilidae

- genus Pachychilus
  - Pachychilus laevissimus (Sowerby, 1824)

Family Thiaridae

- genus Tarebia
  - Tarebia granifera (Lamarck, 1822) - introduced
- genus Melanoides
  - Melanoides tuberculata (Müller, 1774) - introduced
  - Melanoides sp. - introduced

Family Lymnaeidae

- genus Lymnaea
  - Lymnaea columellaris Say, 1817
  - Lymnaea cubensis Pfeifer, 1839

Family Planorbidae

- genus Helisoma
  - Helisoma duryi (Wetherby, 1989) - introduced
- genus Taphius
  - Taphius glabratus (Say, 1818)

Family Physidae

- genus Aplexa
  - Aplexa rivalis (Maton & Rackett, 1807)

Family Achatinidae

- genus Achatina
  - Achatina fulica (Bowdick, 1822) - introduced

Family Arionidae

- genus Arion
  - Arion subfuscus (Draparnaud)

Family Amphibulimidae

- genus Dryptus
  - Dryptus marmoratus (Dunker, 1844)
- genus Plekocheilus
  - Plekocheilus distortus (Bruguiére, 1789)
  - Plekocheilus euryomphala (Jonas, 1844)

Family Orthalicidae

- genus Orthalicus
  - Orthalicus maracaibensis (Pfeiffer, 1856)

Family Camaenidae

- genus Labyrinthus
  - Labyrinthus plicatus (Born, 1780)
  - Labyrinthus umbrus Thompson, 1957

Family Helicidae

- genus Helix
  - Cepaea hortensis (Müller, 1774) - introduced
  - Cepaea nemoralis (Linnaeus, 1758) - introduced
  - Cornu aspersum = Helix aspersa Müller, 1799 - introduced
  - Helix pomatia Linnaeus, 1758 - introduced

Family Agriolimacidae

- genus Deroceras
  - Deroceras laeve (Müller, 1774)

Family Strophocheilidae

- genus Megalobulimus
  - Megalobulimus oblongus (Müller, 1774)

Family Subulinidae

- genus Lamellaxis
  - Lamellaxis micra (D'Orbigny, 1842)
- genus Leptinaria
  - Leptinaria lamellata (Potiez & Michaud, 1838)
  - Leptinaria unilamellata (D'Orbigny, 1842)
- genus Subulina
  - Subulina octona (Bruguiére, 1792)

Family Succineidae

- genus Omalonyx
  - Omalonyx pattersonae Tillier, 1981
- genus Succinea
  - Succinea sp.

Family Veronicellidae

- genus Diplosolenodes
  - Diplosolenodes occidentalis (Guilding, 1825)

== Gallery: mollusk species that occur in El Hatillo Municipality ==
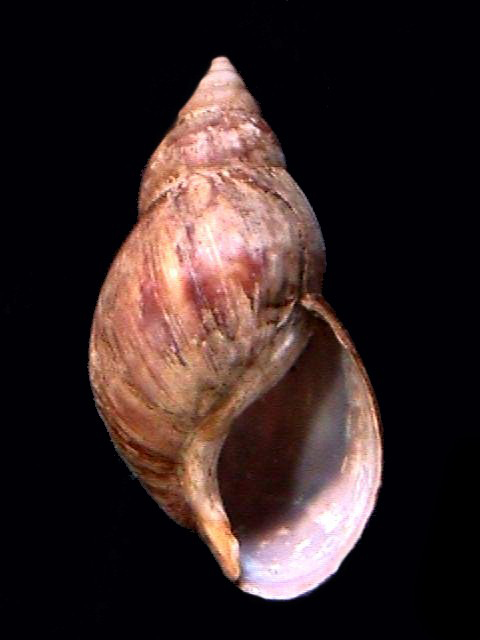
Achatina fulica

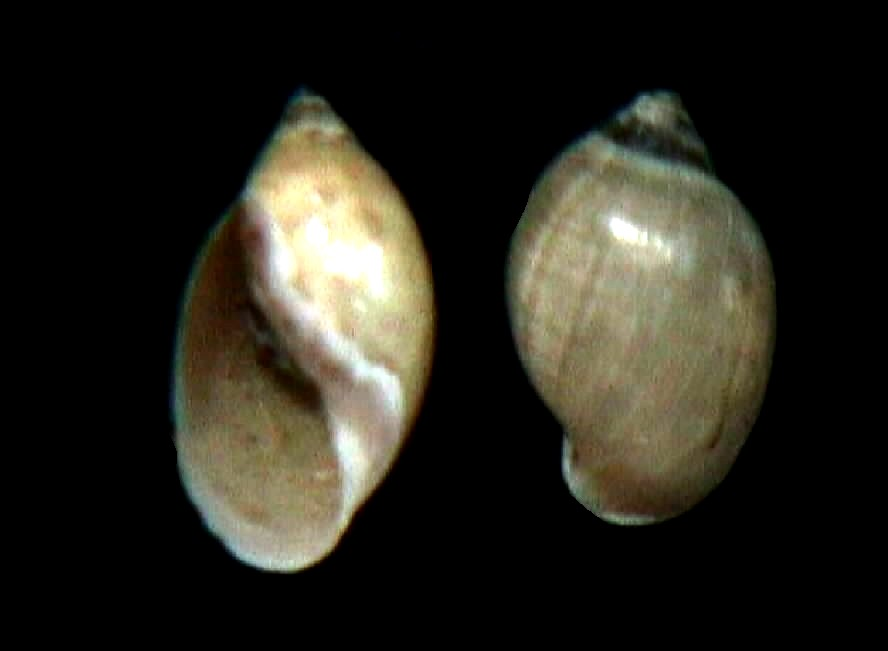
Aplexa rivalis

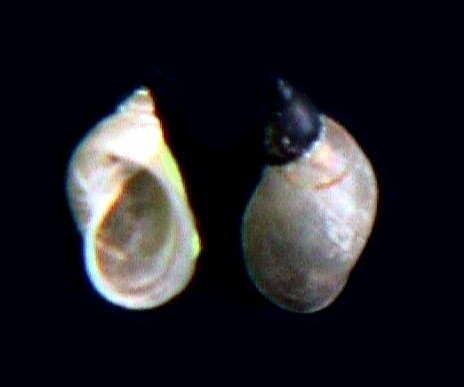
Lymnaea sp.

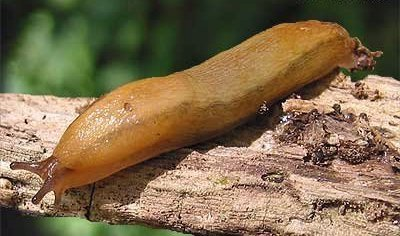
Arion subfuscus

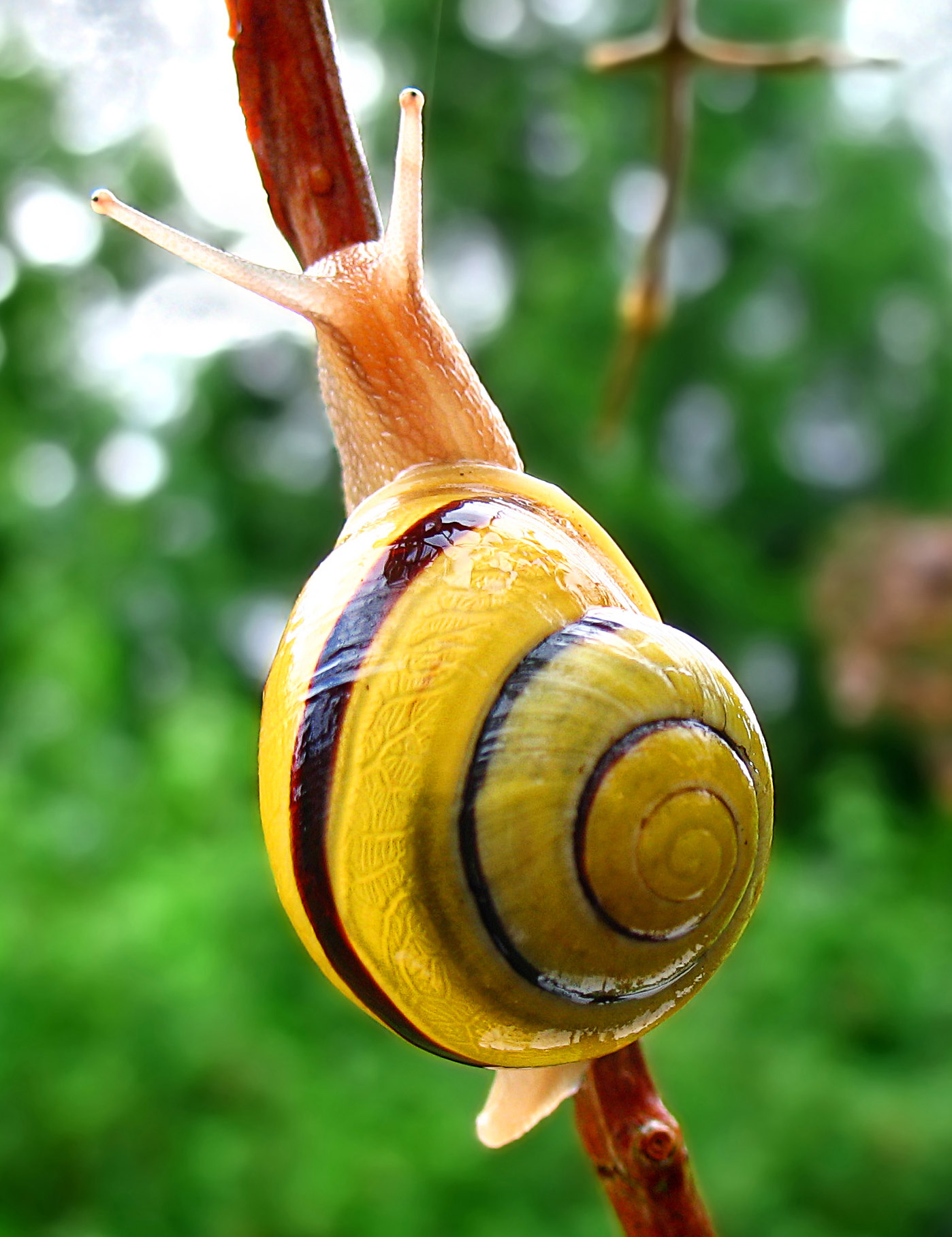
Cepaea hortensis

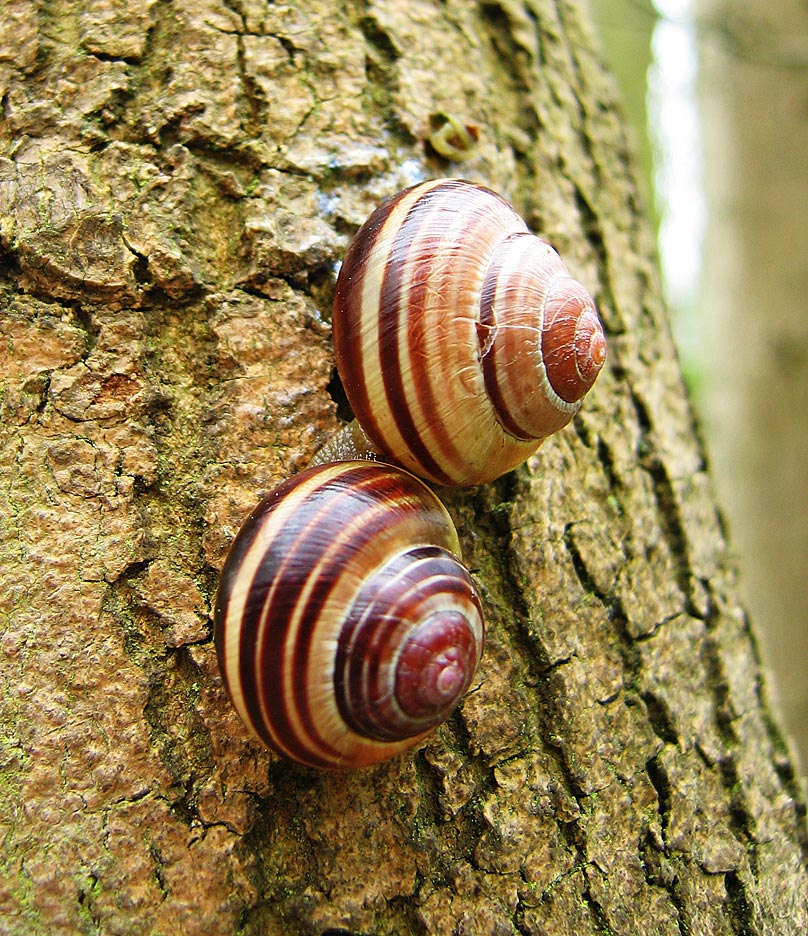
Cepaea nemoralis

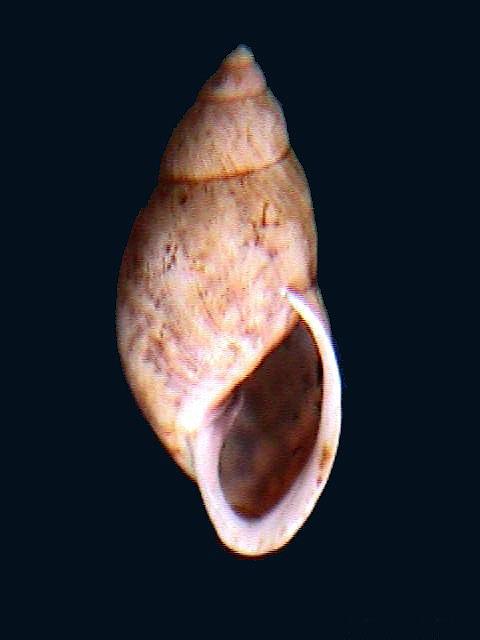
Eudolichotis euryomphala

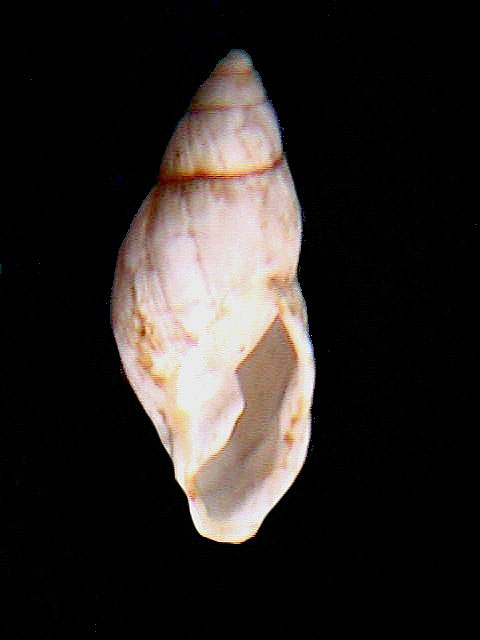
Eudolichotis distorta

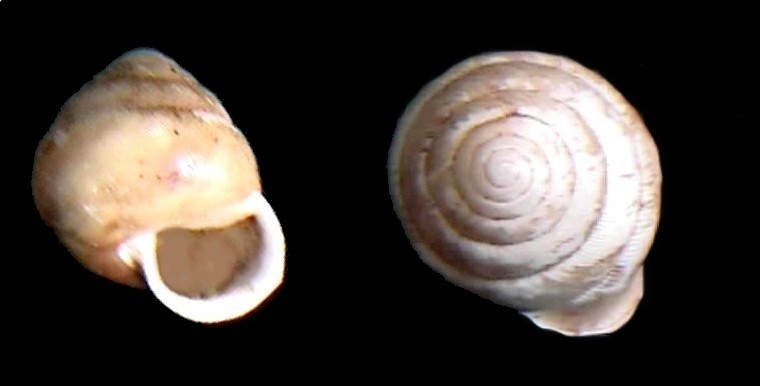
Helicina sp.

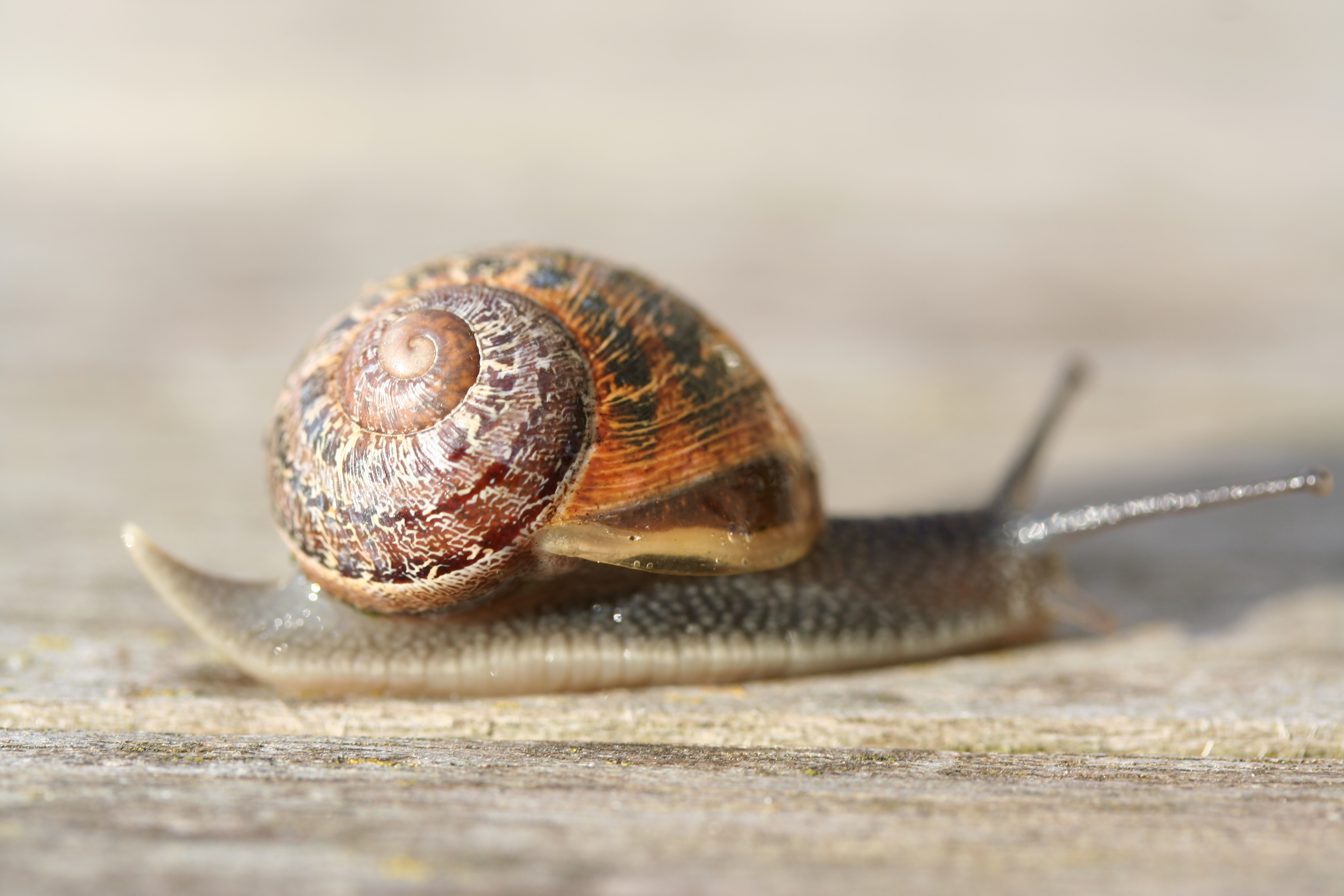
Cornu aspersum

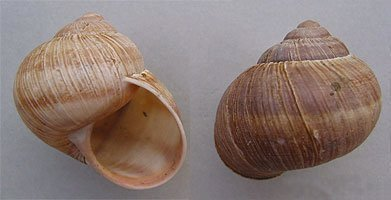
Helix pomatia

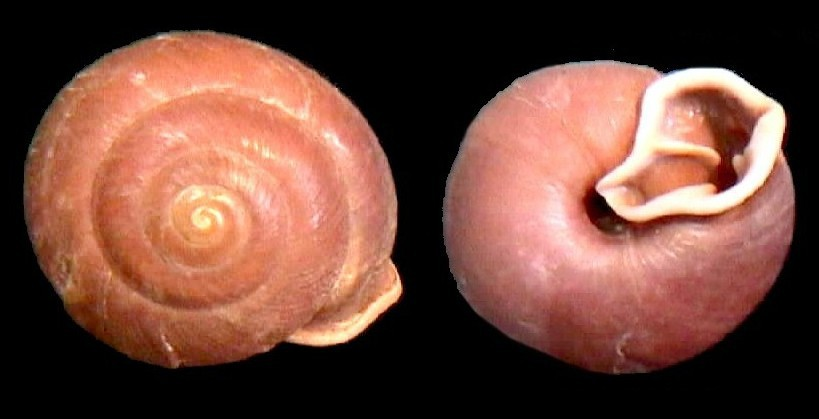
Labyrinthus plicatus

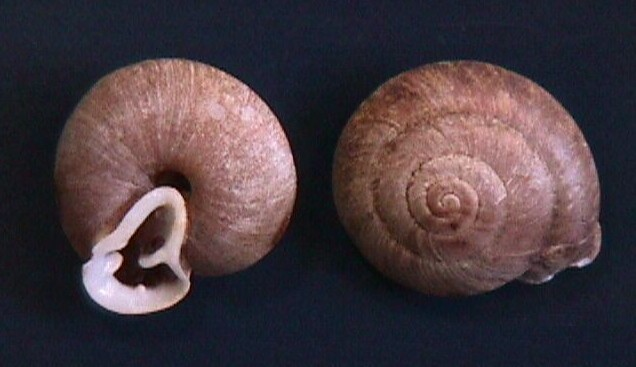
Labyrinthus umbrus

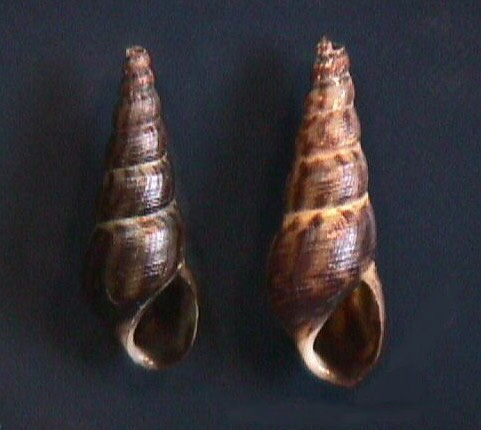
Melanoides tuberculata

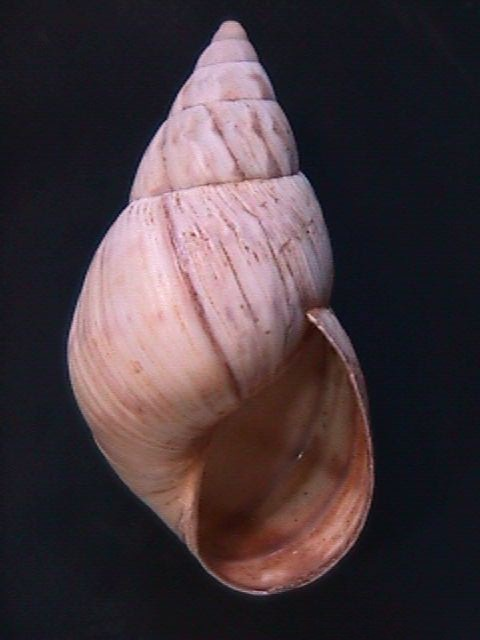
Orthalicus maracaibensis

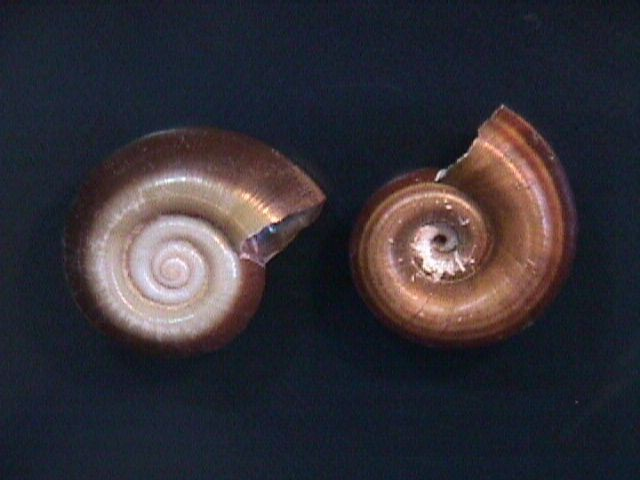
Marisa cornuarietis

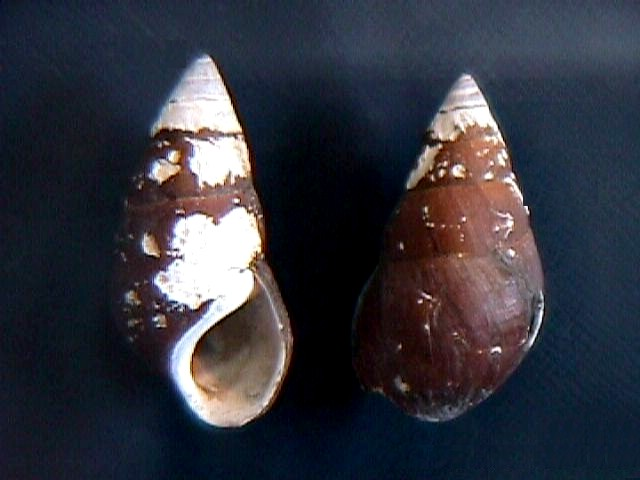
Pachychilus laevissimus

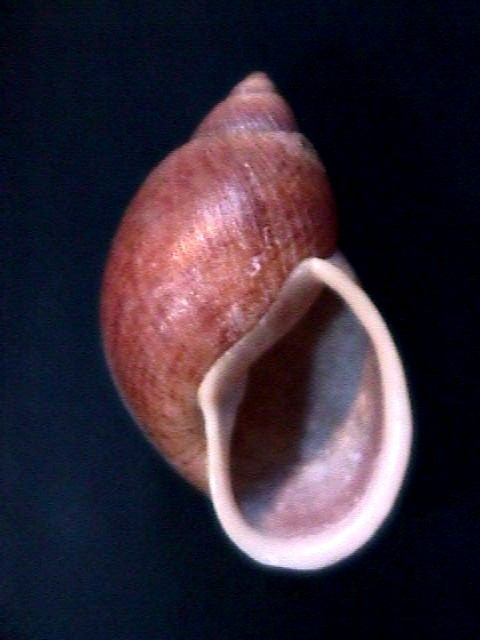
Dryptus marmoratus

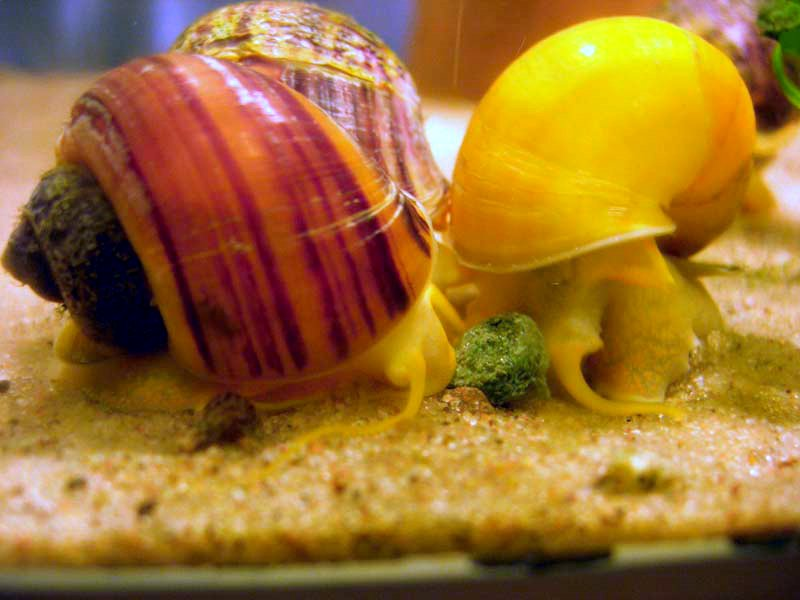
Pomacea bridgesii

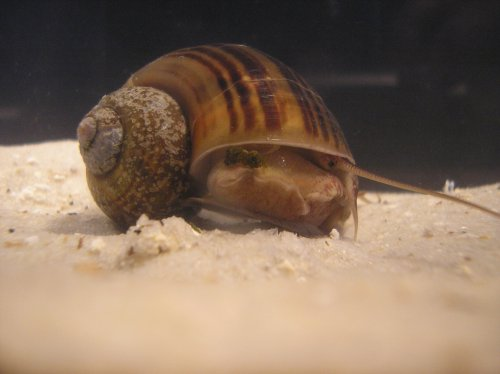
Pomacea canaliculata

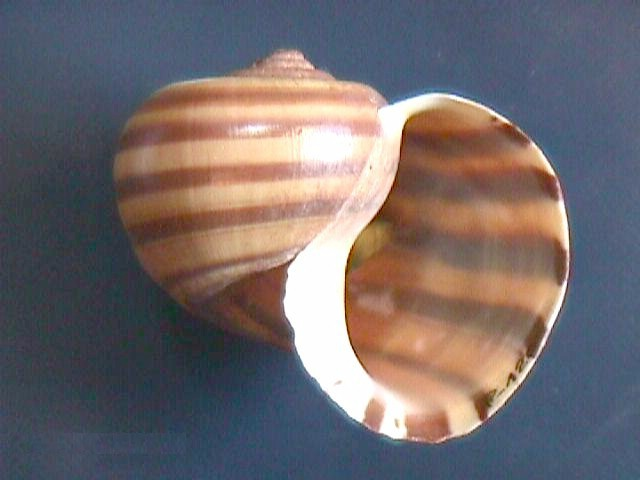
Pomacea glauca

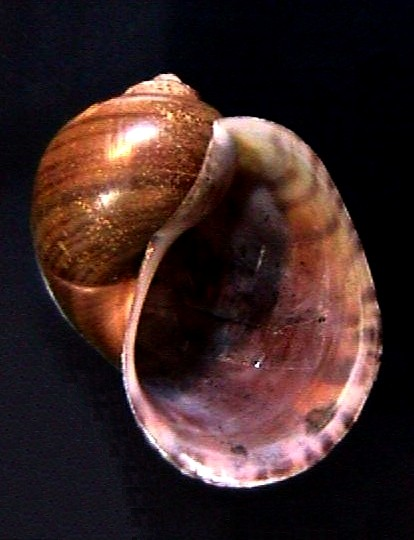
Pomacea haustrum

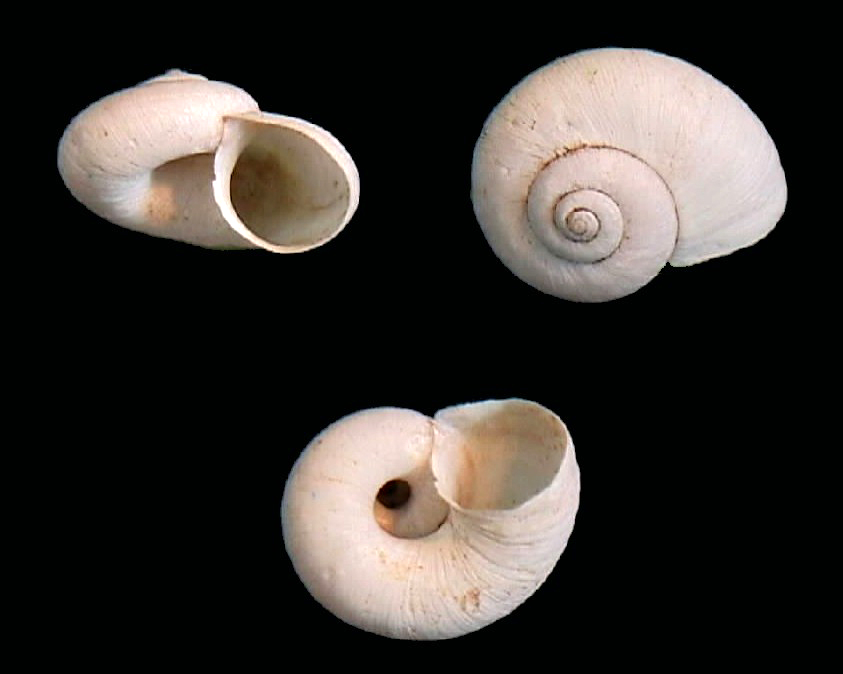
Poteria fasciatum

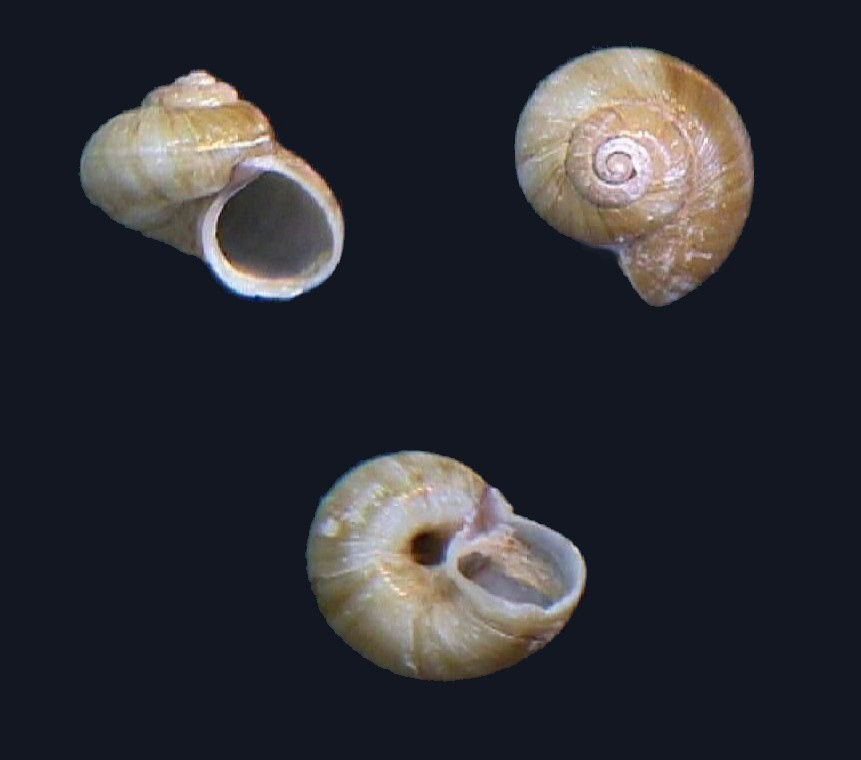
Poteria translucida

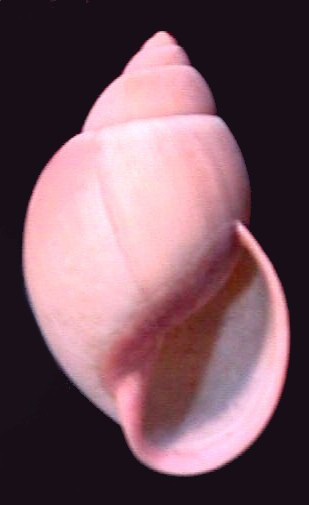
Strophocheilus oblongus

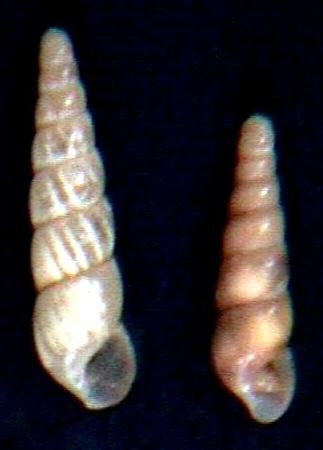
Subulina octona

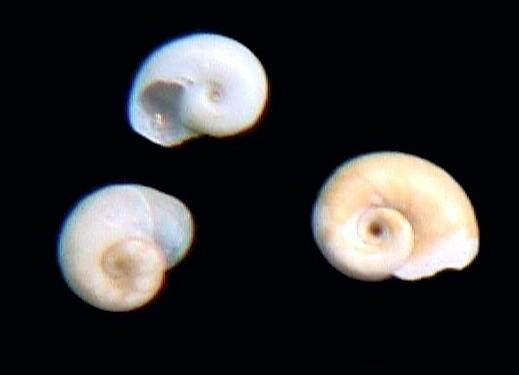
Taphius glabratus

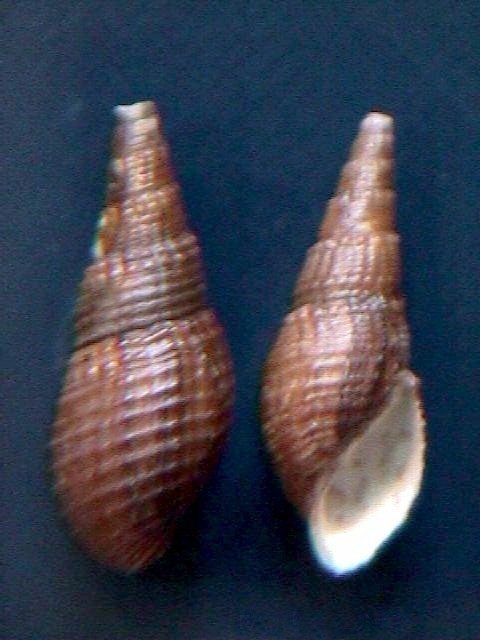
Tarebia granifera

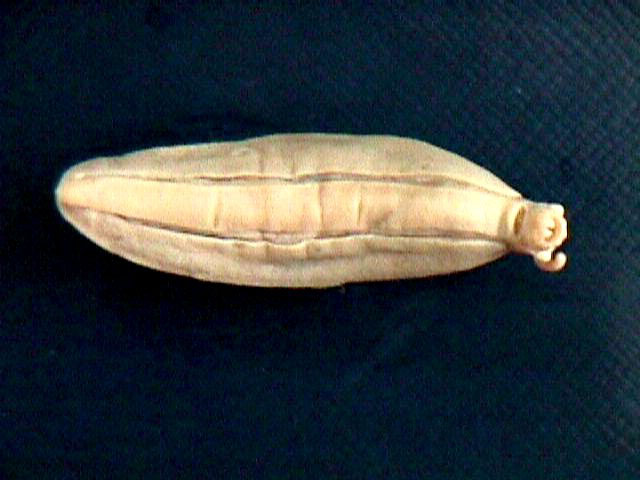
Vaginulus occidentalis

== Bivalves ==
There are an unknown number of freshwater bivalves in the area.

== See also ==
- List of echinoderms of Venezuela
- List of Poriferans of Venezuela
- List of introduced molluscs of Venezuela
- List of marine molluscs of Venezuela
- List of molluscs of Falcón state, Venezuela
- List of non-marine molluscs of Venezuela
- List of birds of Venezuela
- List of mammals of Venezuela

== Cartographies references ==
- Blanco D, A. y Fuentes, R. S/F. “El Hatillo destino ecoturístico para observadores de aves”. IATURH. Caracas - Venezuela
- República de Venezuela. 1964: “Caracas”. Dirección de Cartografía Nacional. Hoja 6847. Escala 1: 100000.
