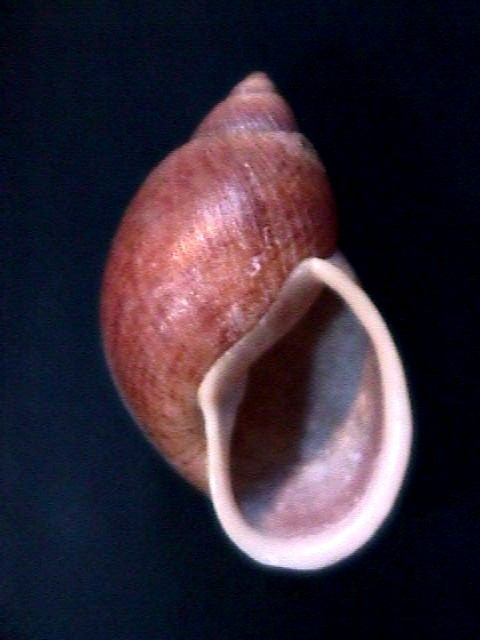
- Apertural view of a shell of Dryptus marmoratus.

Scientific classification
- Kingdom: Animalia
- Phylum: Mollusca
- Class: Gastropoda
- Order: Stylommatophora
- Family: Amphibulimidae
- Genus: Dryptus
- Species: D. marmoratus

Binomial name
- Dryptus marmoratus (Dunker, 1844)

Synonyms
- Bulimus marmoratus Dunker, 1844; Strophocheilus marmoratus; Plekocheilus marmoratus

= Dryptus marmoratus =

Species of gastropod

Dryptus marmoratus is a species of air-breathing land snail, a terrestrial pulmonate gastropod mollusc in the family Amphibulimidae.

== Distribution ==
- This species occurs in El Hatillo Municipality, Miranda, Venezuela
