= Amphibulima cucullata =

Scientific classification
- Kingdom: Animalia
- Phylum: Mollusca
- Class: Gastropoda
- Order: Stylommatophora
- Family: Amphibulimidae
- Genus: Amphibulima
- Species: A. cucullata

Binomial name
- Amphibulima cucullata Lamarck, 1805

Species of gastropod

Amphibulima cucullata is a species of tropical air-breathing land snail, a pulmonate gastropod mollusk in the family Amphibulimidae.

== Description ==
The length of the shell attains 52 mm, its diameter 22 mm.

(Original description in French) This species exhibits a significantly larger shell compared to the others in this genus. It is distinguished by its exceptionally large and oblique aperture and abbreviated spire. The shell is oval, swollen, and consists of only three and a half spiral whorls. The notably large body whorl comprises five-sixths of the shell's length.

When viewed from the aperture, the shell resembles a hood or concave ear, revealing the entire columella or internal spiral. The outer lip originates on the anterior convexity of the body whorl, merging with the columella. The shell's dorsal surface, particularly the body whorl, displays numerous oblique transverse striae, indicative of successive growth stages. The spire is very short, nearly smooth, orange-red, and composed of two and a half whorls with a very obtuse apex.

== Distribution ==
The species occurs in the Caribbean region on Guadeloupe, Saint Kitts and Dominica.
