= Amphibulima rawsonis =

Scientific classification
- Kingdom: Animalia
- Phylum: Mollusca
- Class: Gastropoda
- Order: Stylommatophora
- Family: Amphibulimidae
- Genus: Amphibulima
- Species: A. rawsonis

Binomial name
- Amphibulima rawsonis Bland, 1876

Species of gastropod

Amphibulima rawsonis is a species of tropical air-breathing land snail, a pulmonate gastropod mollusk in the family Amphibulimidae.

== Distribution ==
This species occurs in the Caribbean on Montserrat.

== Description ==
The length of the shell attains 18 mm, its diameter 10 mm.

(Original description) The shell, ovate-oblong in shape, is thin and slightly translucent. It exhibits irregular rib-like striae that are decussated by impressed lines paralleling the suture. Its surface is shining, with a dark horn coloration and sparse reddish spots. The spire is short and obtuse, rufous in hue, and a reddish line is visible beneath the impressed suture. The shell comprises three whorls, with the body whorl being convex and significantly deflected at the aperture. The columella is callous and recedes. The aperture is oblique, oblong-oval, and exhibits a bluish interior. The peristome is simple, with a slight thickening, a sinuous right margin, and an arcuate columellar margin.
