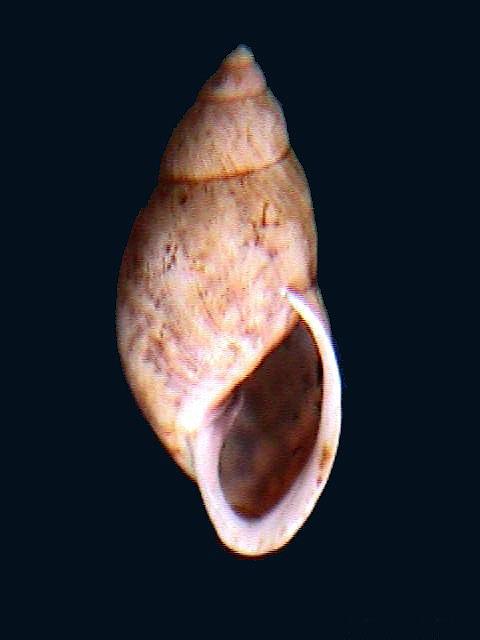
- Apertural view of a shell of Eudolichotis euryomphalus.

Scientific classification
- Kingdom: Animalia
- Phylum: Mollusca
- Class: Gastropoda
- Order: Stylommatophora
- Family: Amphibulimidae
- Genus: Plekocheilus
- Species: P. euryomphalus

Binomial name
- Plekocheilus euryomphalus (Jonas, 1844)

Synonyms
- Bulimus otostomus Pfeiffer, 1855; Plekocheilus (Eudolichotis) euryomphalus (Jonas, 1844); Plekocheilus (Eudolichotis) otostomus (Pfeiffer, 1855)

= Plekocheilus euryomphalus =

Species of gastropod

Plekocheilus euryomphalus is a species of air-breathing land snail, a terrestrial pulmonate gastropod mollusc in the family Amphibulimidae.

== Distribution ==
This species occurs in:

- El Hatillo Municipality, Miranda, Venezuela
