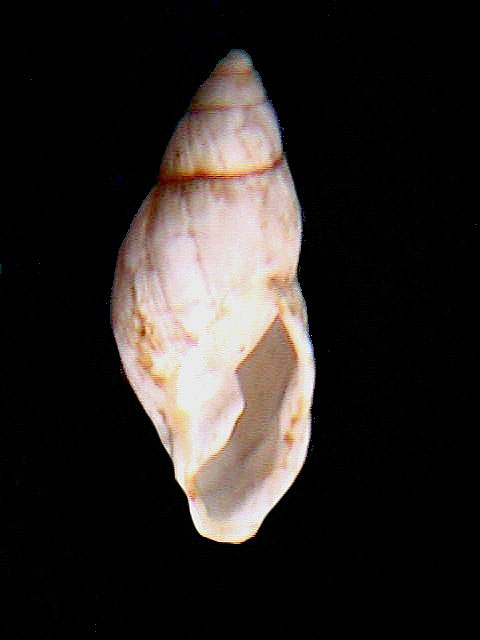
- Apertural view of the shell of Plekocheilus distortus.

Scientific classification
- Kingdom: Animalia
- Phylum: Mollusca
- Class: Gastropoda
- Order: Stylommatophora
- Family: Amphibulimidae
- Genus: Plekocheilus
- Species: P. distortus

Binomial name
- Plekocheilus distortus (Bruguière, 1789)

Synonyms
- Eudolichotis distorta

= Plekocheilus distortus =

Species of gastropod

Plekocheilus distortus is a species of air-breathing land snail, a terrestrial pulmonate gastropod mollusk in the family Amphibulimidae.

== Distribution ==
This species occurs in:

- Brazil
- El Hatillo Municipality, Miranda, Venezuela
