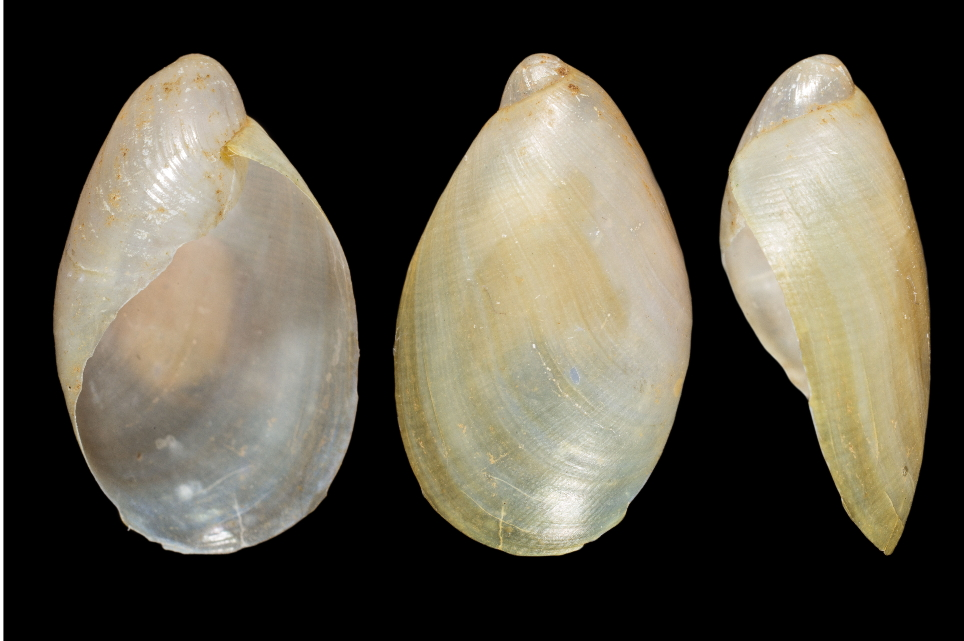
- Shell of Amphibulima tigrina (syntype at MNHN, Paris)

Scientific classification
- Kingdom: Animalia
- Phylum: Mollusca
- Class: Gastropoda
- Order: Stylommatophora
- Family: Amphibulimidae
- Genus: Amphibulima
- Species: A. tigrina

Binomial name
- Amphibulima tigrina (Lesueur, 1822)

Synonyms
- Amphibulima (Amphibulima) tigrina (Lesueur, 1822) alternative representation; Helix (Cochlohydra) tigrina Lesueur, 1822 (original combination); Succinea tigrina (Lesueur, 1822) superseded combination

= Amphibulima tigrina =

Species of gastropod

Amphibulima tigrina is a species of tropical air-breathing land snail, a pulmonate gastropod mollusk in the family Amphibulimidae.

== Distribution ==
This species occurs in the Caribbean on Dominica and Saint Vincent.

== Description ==
The length of the shell attains 18 mm, its diameter 11 mm.

(Original description in French) The shell is markedly depressed and exhibits a subpatelliform morphology. Its apex is composed of a mere one and a half whorls, with the body whorl forming the totality of the shell structure. The shell presents a regularly oval, nearly symmetrical outline, and its aperture is nearly commensurate with the shell's overall size. A subtle columellar rim is created by the penultimate whorl, leading to a fully uncoiled and open shell with exceptionally thin margins. The columella is slightly obtuse and reveals a weakly protruding spiral of one and a half whorls within. This exceptionally delicate shell is finely striated due to growth increments, and its amber-yellow test is adorned with small, reddish, subcircular spots.

== External sources ==
- Guppy, R. J. L. (1881). "On the land-shells of S. Vincent, W. I." Proceedings of the Scientific Association of Trinidad. 2 (4): 165-166.
