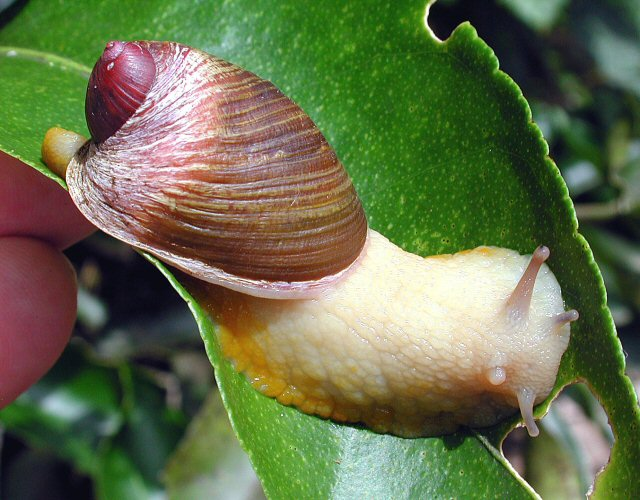
- A live individual of Amphibulima patula dominicensis

Scientific classification
- Kingdom: Animalia
- Phylum: Mollusca
- Class: Gastropoda
- Order: Stylommatophora
- Suborder: Helicina
- Superfamily: Orthalicoidea
- Family: Amphibulimidae
- Genus: Amphibulima; Lamarck, 1805

Type species
- Amphibulima cucullata Lamarck, 1805

Synonyms
- Amphibulia Rafinesque, 1815 (Invalid: unjustified emendation of Amphibulima Lamarck, 1805); Amphibulima (Amphibulima) Lamarck, 1805 · alternate representation; Amphibulimus Montfort, 1810 (Invalid: unjustified emendation of Amphibulima Lamarck, 1805)

= Amphibulima =

Genus of gastropods

Amphibulima is a genus of air-breathing land snails, a terrestrial pulmonate gastropod mollusks in the family Amphibulimidae.

Amphibulima is the type genus of the subfamily Amphibuliminae.

== Description ==
(Original description in French) The univalve shell, oval to oval-conical in shape, features an entire aperture longer than wide. The outer lip of the aperture is sharp, non-reflected, ascending onto and merging seamlessly with the columella, which lacks folds. An operculum is absent.

== Species ==
Species in the genus Amphibulima include:

- Amphibulima browni Pilsbry, 1899 – endemic to Dominica
- Amphibulima cucullata Lamarck, 1805
- Amphibulima pardalina Guppy, 1868 – endemic to Dominica
- Amphibulima patula (Bruguière, 1792)
- Amphibulima rawsonis Bland, 1876
- Amphibulima tigrina (Lesueur in Férussac, 1821)

Species brought into synonymy

- Amphibulima depressa (Rang, 1834) accepted as Pellicula depressa (Rang, 1834) (superseded combination)
- Amphibulima felina Guppy, 1873 accepted as Omalonyx unguis (d'Orbigny, 1836) (junior synonym)
- Amphibulima imbricata Rochebrune, 1882: synonym of Hyalimax imbricatus (Rochebrune, 1882) (original combination)
- Amphibulima rubescens (Deshayes, 1830) – endemic to Martinique: synonym of Rhodonyx rubescens (Deshayes, 1830)
- Amphibulima succinea Lamarck, 1805: synonym of Succinea putris (Linnaeus, 1758) (invalid: unjustified replacement

Comparison of species of Amphibulima:

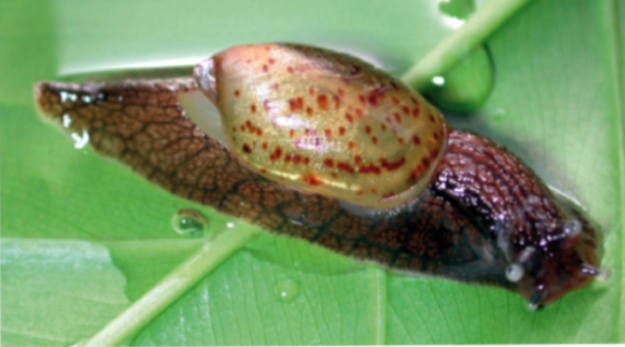
Amphibulima pardalina

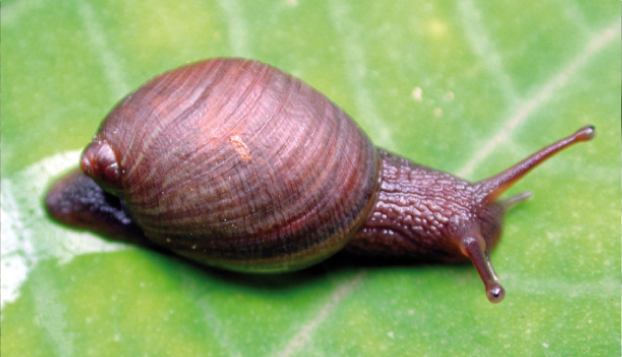
Amphibulima patula dominicensis
