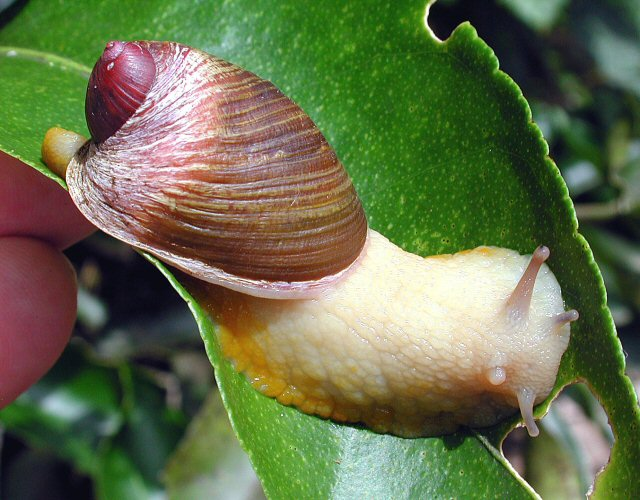
- A live individual of Amphibulima patula dominicensis

Scientific classification
- Kingdom: Animalia
- Phylum: Mollusca
- Class: Gastropoda
- Order: Stylommatophora
- Family: Amphibulimidae
- Genus: Amphibulima
- Species: A. patula

Binomial name
- Amphibulima patula (Bruguière, 1792)

Synonyms
- Bulimus patulus Bruguière, 1792

= Amphibulima patula =

Species of gastropod

Amphibulima patula is a species of air-breathing land snail, a terrestrial pulmonate gastropod mollusk in the family Amphibulimidae.

== Subspecies ==
Subspecies of Amphibulima patula include:

- Amphibulima patula christopheri Pilsbry, 1902
- Amphibulima patula patula (Bruguière, 1792)
- Amphibulima patula dominicensis Pilsbry, 1899 - Pilsbry (1899) separated the Dominican specimens on the basis of the darker colour and by having a heavier sculptured shell. Robinson et al. (2009) have found living specimens that were either light beige-coloured with a somewhat orange-yellowish line along the foot (see photo on the left), or entirely dark brown coloured (see photo on the right).

Comparison of orange-yellowish and dark brown Amphibulima patula dominicensis:

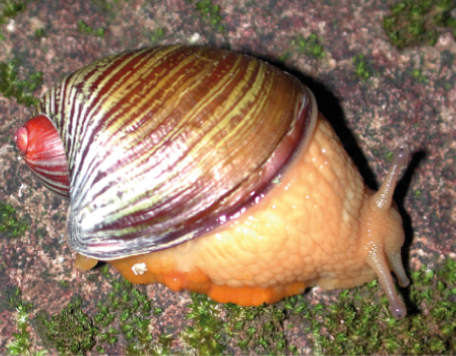
Live Amphibulima patula dominicensis

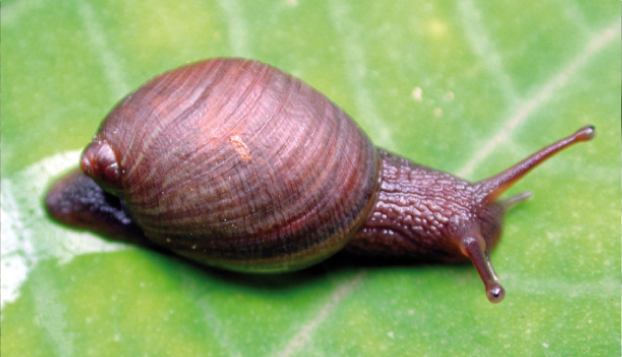
Live Amphibulima patula dominicensis

== Distribution ==
The nominate taxon Amphibulima patula patula has been reported from Guadeloupe (probably now extinct) and Marie-Galante. The type locality is Guadeloupe.

Amphibulima patula dominicensis is endemic to Dominica.

Another variety has been reported from Saint Kitts and Saba.

== Description ==
The length of the adult snail is about 2.5 cm. It is called a slug-like snail because the shell is relatively small in proportion to the body and with one large, ear-like whorl and two small whorls. Color is yellowish brown.

(Original description in French) This shell is notable for its large aperture and flattened form. It is oval, slightly wider near the spire than the base. The spire consists of three whorls, with the body whorl comprising nearly the entire shell. The two apical whorls are slightly raised, nipple-like, with an obtuse tip. The outer surface is marked with deep wrinkles and fine, oblique striae.

The large aperture is highly oblique, roughly rectangular due to an angle at the top of the right lip and its horizontal extension onto the second whorl, a feature unique to this species. The base, though rounded, is laterally widened, contributing to its quadrangular appearance. The right lip terminates in a slightly thickened bulge, more prominent inside than outside, except for its transverse extension, which is twice as thick. The left lip is very thin and adheres to the second whorl. The columella is simple and open, revealing the spire's apex. The shell is greenish externally, with an ashen-white interior and left lip.

Amphibulima patula has a large foot, that is not completely retracted into the shell in the living specimen. But when the live animal is immersed in preserving fluid, then it retracts completely within the shell.

This species could be confused with the common amber snails (Succinea), especially the juveniles. The Amphibulima has much coarser sculpture than the amber snails.

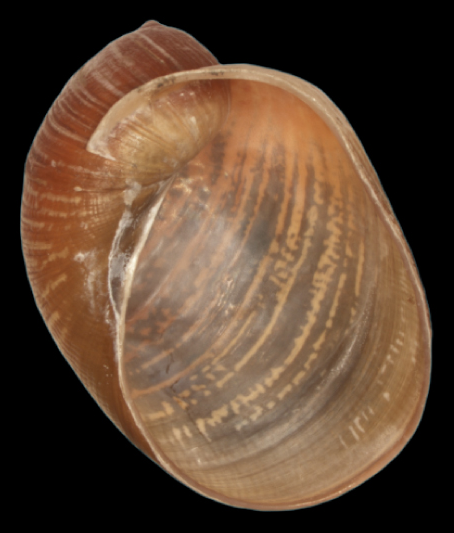
apertural view of the shell of Amphibulima patula dominicensis

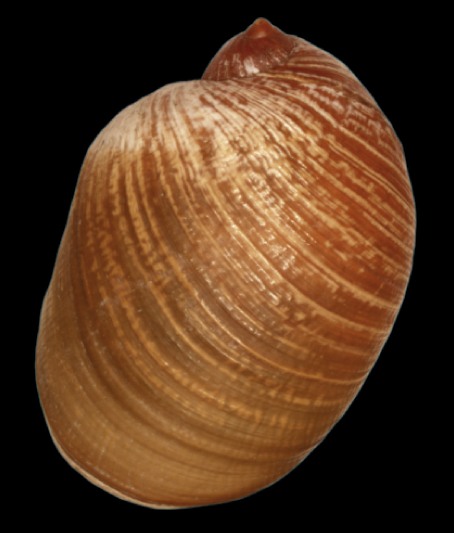
abapertural view of the shell of Amphibulima patula dominicensis

The jaw and radula of Amphibulima patula dominicensis was described by Bland & Binney in 1874.

== Ecology ==
Amphibulima patula dominicensis is frequently found on banana and Citrus plants, where it may feed on the leaves. They also eat leaves of Virginia pepperweed Lepidium virginicum and Cakile lanceolata. They eat lettuce in captivity.
