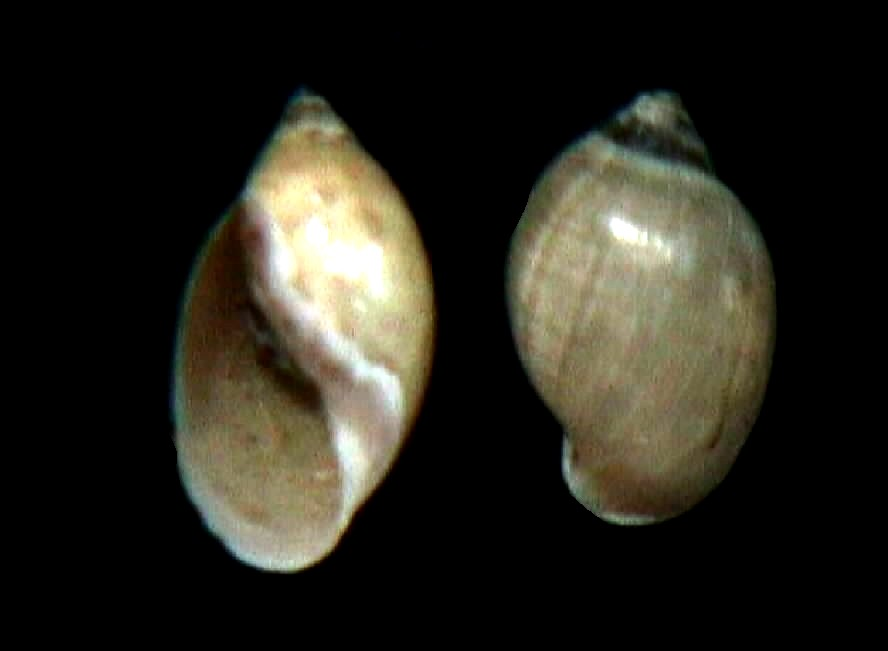
- Shells of Aplexa rivalis.

Scientific classification
- Kingdom: Animalia
- Phylum: Mollusca
- Class: Gastropoda
- Superorder: Hygrophila
- Family: Physidae
- Genus: Aplexa
- Species: A. rivalis

Binomial name
- Aplexa rivalis (Maton & Rackett, 1807)

= Aplexa rivalis =

Species of gastropod

Aplexa rivalis is a species of small air-breathing freshwater snail, an aquatic pulmonate gastropod mollusk in the family Physidae, a family which are sometimes known as the bladder snails.

== Description ==
Rivalis Aplexa has a thin shell levorotatory, featuring a large oval opening with parietal callus lip sharp and wide. The tentacles are filiform and foot is very long in the back. Ovigerous masses are constituted by transparent oval eggs variable number embedded in a gelatinous mass.

== Distribution ==
This species occurs in:

- Brazil
- Venezuela

== Ecology ==
Chaetogaster limnaei and Nais communis were found to be associated with Aplexa rivalis in Brazil. In Venezuela it is found inhabiting ornamental ponds in the leaves of plants and vegetable crops, and are common in aquarium shops.

== See also ==
- List of non-marine molluscs of El Hatillo Municipality, Miranda, Venezuela
