= Gaeotis =

Scientific classification
- Kingdom: Animalia
- Phylum: Mollusca
- Class: Gastropoda
- Order: Stylommatophora
- Family: Amphibulimidae
- Genus: Gaeotis; Shuttleworth, 1854

Diversity
- 4 species

Genus of gastropods

Gaeotis is a genus of air-breathing land semi-slugs, terrestrial pulmonate gastropod mollusks in the family Amphibulimidae.

== Distribution ==
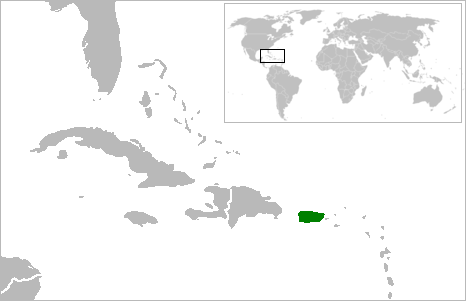
Location of Puerto Rico, where the genus Gaeotis is endemic to.

The genus Gaeotis is endemic to Puerto Rico.

== Species ==
Species within the genus Gaeotis include:

- Gaeotis albopunctulata Shuttleworth, 1854
- Gaeotis flavolineata Shuttleworth, 1854
- Gaeotis malleata Pilsbry, 1899
- Gaeotis nigrolineata Shuttleworth, 1854 - type species of the genus Gaeotis
