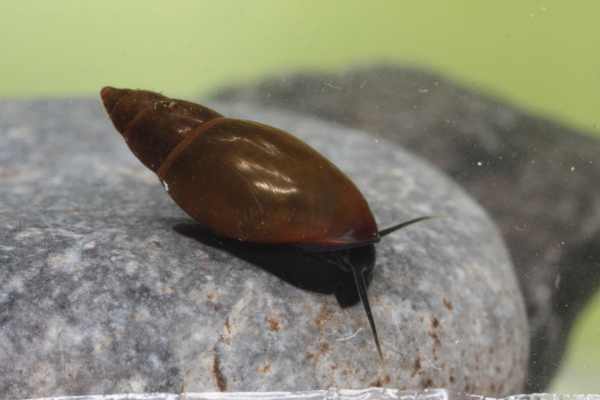
- Live individual
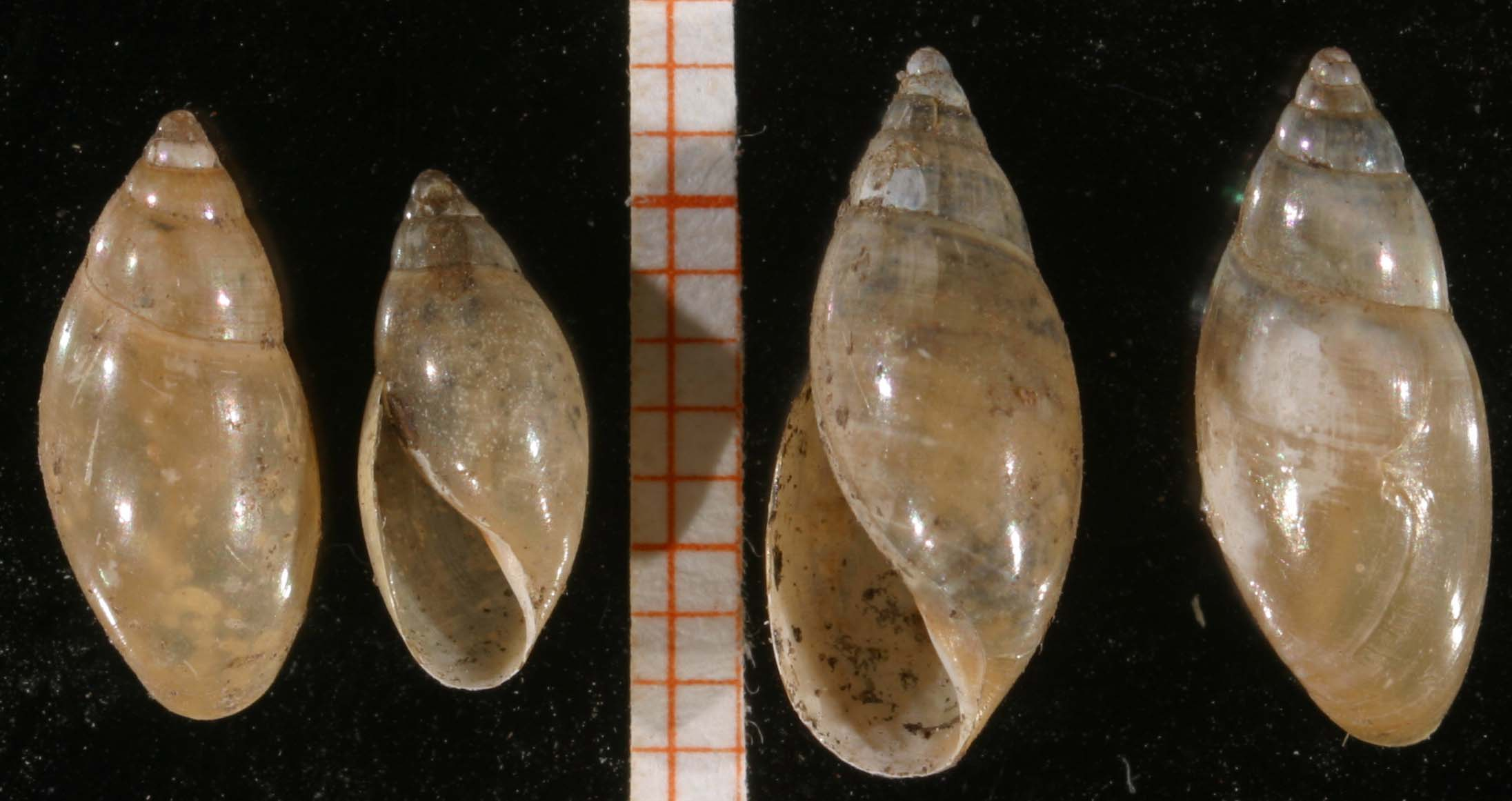
- Shells of Aplexa hypnorum.

Scientific classification
- Kingdom: Animalia
- Phylum: Mollusca
- Class: Gastropoda
- Superorder: Hygrophila
- Family: Physidae
- Genus: Aplexa
- Species: A. hypnorum

Binomial name
- Aplexa hypnorum (Linnaeus, 1758)

= Aplexa hypnorum =

Species of gastropod

Aplexa hypnorum, or by the common name, the moss bladder snail, is a species of small air-breathing freshwater snail. It is an aquatic pulmonate gastropod mollusk in the family Physidae, which are sometimes known as the bladder snails.

As is true of all physids, the shell is sinistral, or left-handed. The species inhabits temporary water bodies and occurs in the Eurosiberian Boreo-temperate or possibly the Eurasian Boreo-temperate if East Siberia specimens are correctly identified. It may be Holarctic, again if North American specimens are correctly identified.

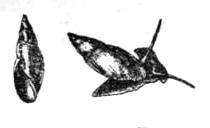
Aplexa hypnorum shell and live animal, as shown by Henry Adams and Arthur Adams, 1858, as Bulinus hypnorum, a synonym.

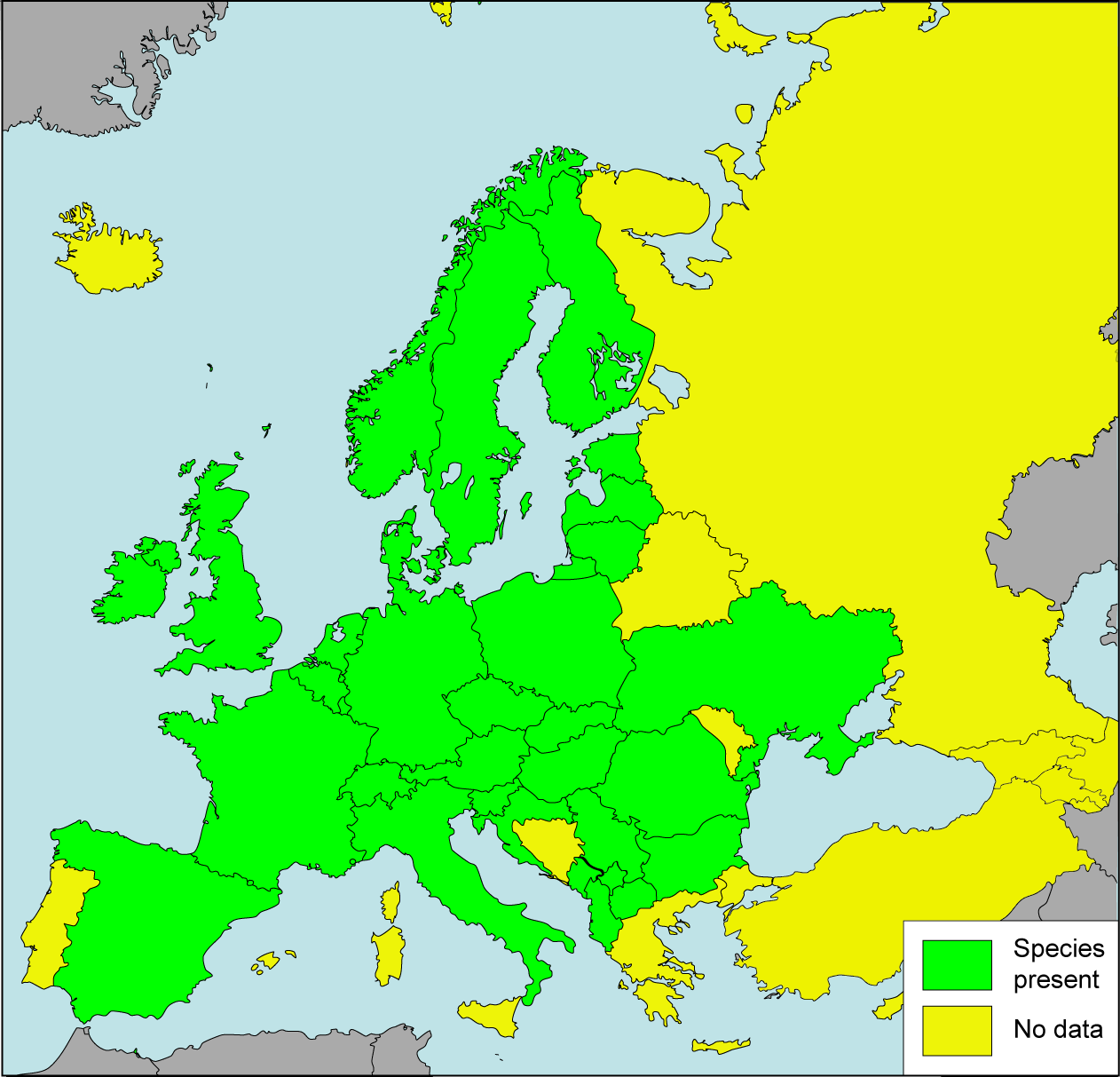
Aplexa hypnorum Presence in European countries

== Distribution ==
- Belgium
- British Isles
- Czech Republic
- Slovakia
- Denmark
- Germany
- Italy
- Netherlands
- Norway
- Poland

== Habitat ==
This species inhabits very shallow ponds and ditches, usually ones that dry out periodically.

== Shell description ==
The shell is translucent and pale brownish in color. It is elongate with a high spire and a narrow aperture. The maximum length of the shell is about 13 mm.

In contrast to the shell, the soft parts of the animal are black or dark grey. The tentacles are long and narrow.

== Life habits ==
This is a surprisingly active and lively snail.

Although the animals themselves die when a temporary pond dries out, the eggs are extremely resistant to desiccation.
