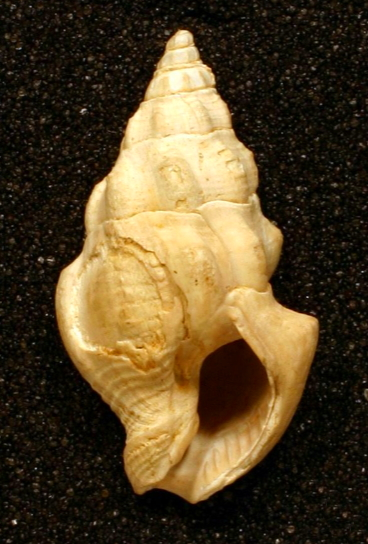
- Shell of Aplexa venezuelensis (paratype at the Paleontological Research Institution)

Scientific classification
- Kingdom: Animalia
- Phylum: Mollusca
- Class: Gastropoda
- Superorder: Hygrophila
- Superfamily: Lymnaeoidea
- Family: Physidae
- Genus: Aplexa
- Species: A. venezuelensis

Binomial name
- Aplexa venezuelensis (E. von Martens, 1859)

Synonyms
- Physa venezuelensis E. von Martens, 1859 superseded combination; Stenophysa venezuelensis (E. von Martens, 1859) superseded combination

= Aplexa venezuelensis =

Species of gastropod

Aplexa venezuelensis is a species of small air-breathing freshwater snail, an aquatic pulmonate gastropod mollusk in the family Physidae, a family which are sometimes known as the bladder snails.

== Description ==
The snail can attain a shell length of 18 millimetres (0.71 in) and a diameter of 10 millimetres (0.39 in).

(Original description in Latin) This shell is ovate and lustrous and contains five whorls.It features a thin, striped, pale horn-colored surface. It tapers to a sharp, dark apex, and its suture is ridged and cross-hatched with a rusty hue. The oblong aperture narrows gradually upwards. It accounts for five-sixths of the shell's total length, and it possesses a small, white columellar fold.

== Distribution ==
This species occurs in Venezuela.
