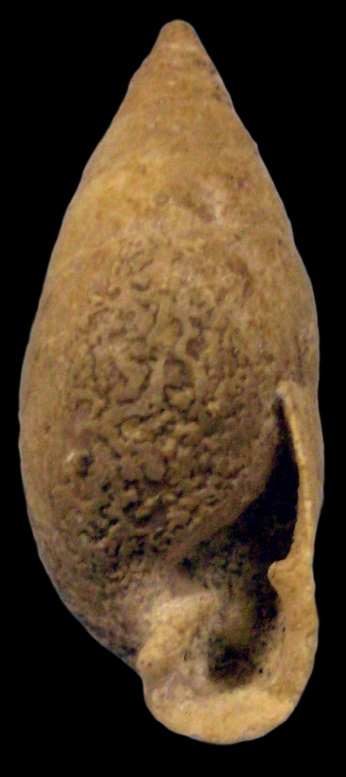
- Apertural view of a fossil shell of Cortana carvalhoi

Scientific classification
- Kingdom: Animalia
- Phylum: Mollusca
- Class: Gastropoda
- Order: Stylommatophora
- Family: Amphibulimidae
- Genus: †Cortana; Salvador & Simone, 2013
- Species: †C. carvalhoi

Binomial name
- †Cortana carvalhoi (Brito, 1967)

Synonyms
- Bulimulus carvalhoi Brito, 1967

= Cortana carvalhoi =

Cortana carvalhoi Temporal range: Paleocene

Extinct species of gastropod

Cortana is a fossil genus of medium-sized air-breathing land snails, terrestrial pulmonate gastropods in the family Amphibulimidae. The only species is Cortana carvalhoi. The genus is known only from the Brazilian Paleocene deposits of the Itaboraí Basin, in the state of Rio de Janeiro. The most characteristic feature of the genus is its apertural armature.

== Etymology ==
The etymology is explained in "Taxonomic revision of the fossil pulmonate mollusks of Itaboraí Basin (Paleocene), Brazil" as "Etymology: The name was taken from a character of the science fiction franchise "Halo", and alludes to the convoluted markings on the shell surface of the holotype of Cortana carvalhoi. Grammatical gender: feminine."

== Species ==
The sole species in the genus is Cortana carvalhoi (Brito, 1967).
