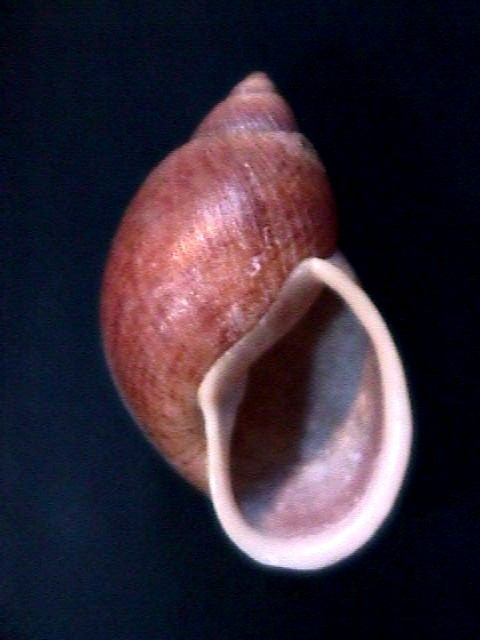
- Apertual view of a shell of Dryptus marmoratus.

Scientific classification
- Kingdom: Animalia
- Phylum: Mollusca
- Class: Gastropoda
- Order: Stylommatophora
- Family: Amphibulimidae
- Genus: Dryptus; Albers, 1860

Diversity
- 7 species

= Dryptus =

Genus of gastropods

Dryptus is a genus of air-breathing land snails, terrestrial pulmonate gastropod mollusks in the family Amphibulimidae.

== Distribution ==
Distribution of the genus Dryptus include Colombia and Venezuela.

== Species ==
Species within the genus Dryptus include:

- Dryptus funckii (Nyst, 1843) - synonym: Bulimus adoptus Reeve, 1849
- Dryptus guerini (Pfeiffer, 1846)
- Dryptus jubeus (Fulton, 1908)
- Dryptus marmoratus (Dunker in Philippi, 1844)
- Dryptus moritzianus (Pfeiffer, 1847)
- Dryptus pardalis (Férussac, 1821)
- Dryptus stuebeli (Martens, 1885)
