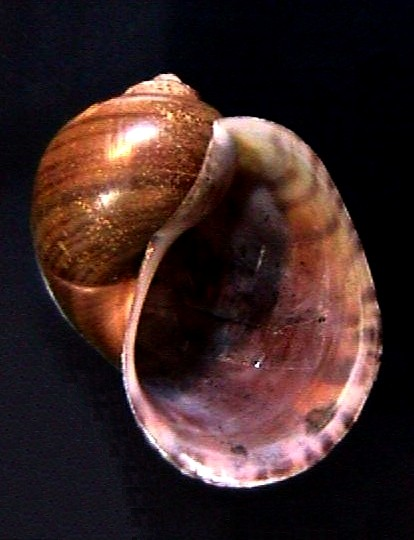
- Apertural view of a shell of Pomacea haustrum

Scientific classification
- Kingdom: Animalia
- Phylum: Mollusca
- Class: Gastropoda
- Subclass: Caenogastropoda
- Order: Architaenioglossa
- Family: Ampullariidae
- Genus: Pomacea
- Species: P. haustrum

Binomial name
- Pomacea haustrum (Reeve, 1856)

= Pomacea haustrum =

Species of gastropod

Pomacea haustrum, common name the titan applesnail, is a species of large freshwater snail with an operculum, an aquatic gastropod mollusk in the family Ampullariidae, the applesnails.

== Original description ==
Pomacea haustrum was originally described under the name Ampullaria haustrum by Lovell Augustus Reeve in his book Conchologia Iconica, in 1856.

In Reeve's original text, (the type description) reads as follows:

Species 23. (Mus. Cuming.)

AMPULLARIA HAUSTRUM. Amp. testâ compressè ovatâ, ventricosissimâ, vix umbilicatâ, spirâ parvâ, subimmersâ, anfractibus ad suturam impressè canaliculatis, deinde convexis; sordidè olivaceâ, striatâ et malleatâ, fasciis angustis pallidè virescentibus cingulatâ; aperturâ pyrifomi-oblongâ, peramplâ; fauce livida- purpureâ.

THE SCOOP AMPULLARIA. Shell compressly ovate, very ventricose, scarcely umbilicated, spire small, rather immersed, whorls impressly channelled at the suture, then convex; dull olive, striated and malleated, encircled with narrow faint green bands; aperture pyriformly oblong, very large; livid purple in the interior.

Hab. River Maranon, Brazil.

This fine species belongs to the same type as A. insularum, D ́Orbigny, from La Plata. Its chief points of difference consist in being less distinctly umbilicated,

and in having a much larger and more expanded aperture.

It is difficult to identify even the general region of the type locality for this species. The type locality was given as the Río Marañón, Brazil, but this river is in Peru, joining with the Rio Ucayali above Iquitos to become the Rio Solimões, which in turn joins with the Rio Negro to become the Amazon River of Brazil. Some of the first Europeans to explore the region in the sixteenth century, however, referred to the Amazon River as El Río Marañón, and some nineteenth century maps refer to the entire Amazon as the Marañón. It is likely that the Río Marañón of one collector was not the same as the Río Marañón of another.

It was considered a synonym of Pomacea canaliculata by Thompson (1997) based on shell morphology, but tentatively retained as a separate species by Cowie & Thiengo, because of its reported production of green eggs. Phylogenetic analyses by Rawlings et al. (2007) confirmed its species status.

== Shell description ==
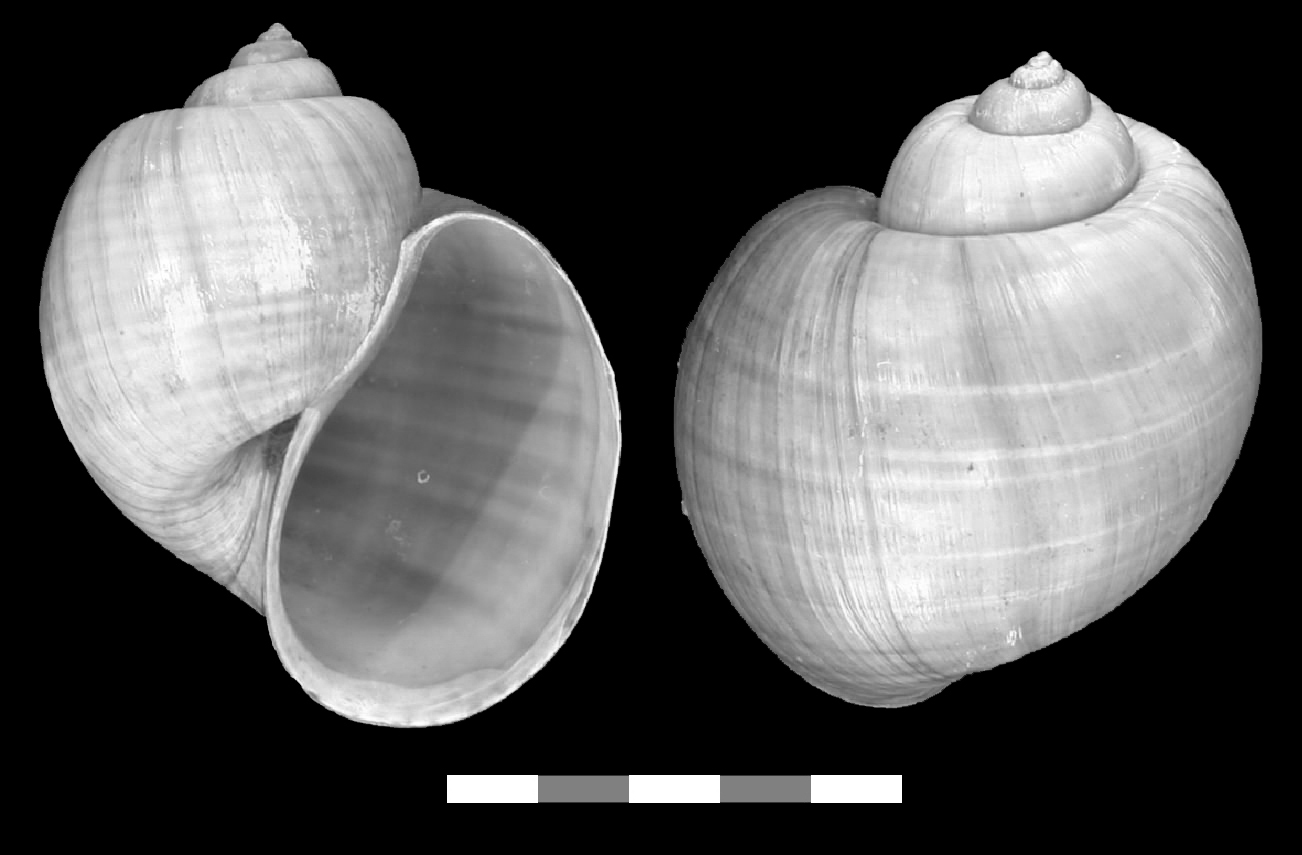
shells of Pomacea haustrum. Scale bar is 5 cm.

Pomacea haustrum is a large species that has a large globular shell with a channeled suture.

== Distribution ==
The indigenous distribution of Pomacea haustrum is Bolivia, Brazil and Peru in South America.

The nonindigenous distribution includes the United States: Loxahatchee National Wildlife Refuge waters in Palm Beach County, Florida. Pomacea haustrum were discovered in the late 1970s in Palm Beach County Florida, and have not spread appreciably in 30 years. This is the only known area where this species is established in the United States. The initial introduction in the United States was probably from aquarium release, aka "aquarium dumping". Pomacea haustrum is currently of relatively minor concern in the U.S., given its failure to spread beyond Palm Beach County after 30 years or more in Florida. However, many species have maintained limited distributions, sometimes for decades, before becoming invasive.

== Ecology ==
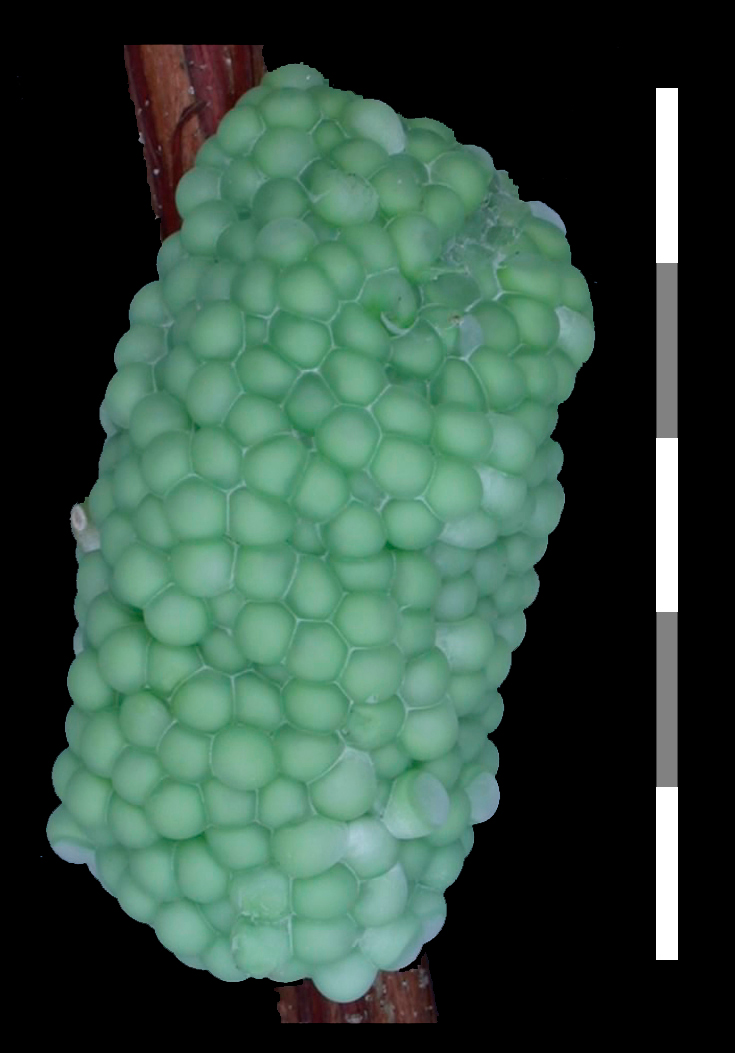
Eggs of Pomacea haustrum, scale bar in cm.

=== Habitat ===
This species lives in freshwater rivers.

=== Life cycle ===
Populations of Pomacea haustrum in Florida produce bright green egg masses consisting of individual eggs approximately 3–5 mm in size compressed into polygonal shapes, giving the egg mass an irregular honeycombed appearance. Since other Pomacea species also produce green eggs, this character is insufficient to verify this species as Pomacea haustrum. It lays its eggs in clutches above the water level.
