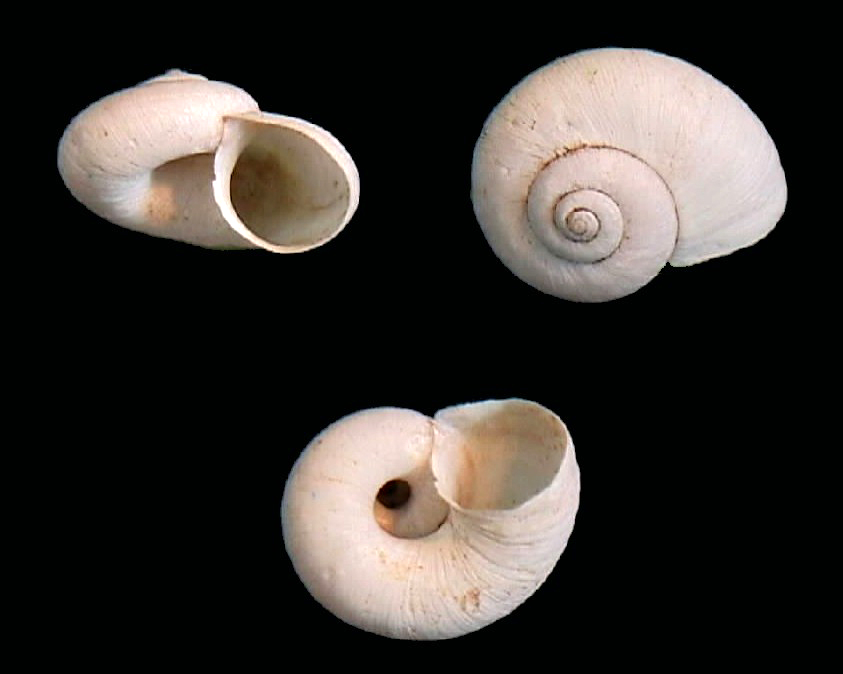
- Three views of a shell of Poteria fasciatum

Scientific classification
- Kingdom: Animalia
- Phylum: Mollusca
- Class: Gastropoda
- Subclass: Caenogastropoda
- Order: Architaenioglossa
- Family: Neocyclotidae
- Genus: Poteria
- Species: P. fasciatum

Binomial name
- Poteria fasciatum (Kobelt & Schwanheim, 1912)

= Poteria fasciatum =

Species of gastropod

Poteria fasciatum is a species of tropical land snail with gills and an operculum, a terrestrial gastropod mollusk in the family Neocyclotidae.
