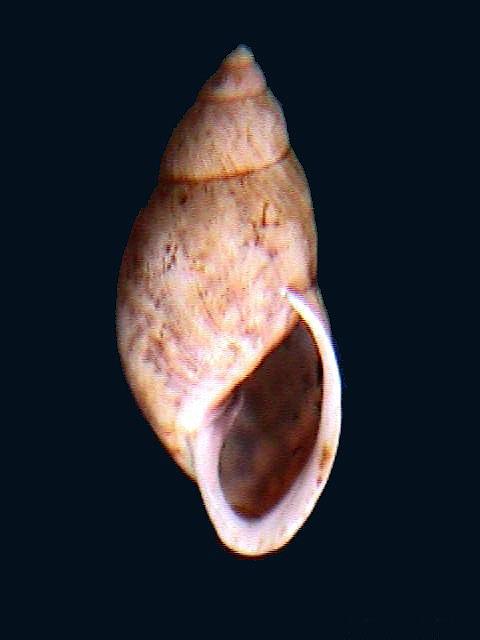
- Apertual view of a shell of Plekocheilus euryomphalus.

Scientific classification
- Domain: Eukaryota
- Kingdom: Animalia
- Phylum: Mollusca
- Class: Gastropoda
- Order: Stylommatophora
- Suborder: Helicina
- Superfamily: Orthalicoidea
- Family: Amphibulimidae
- Genus: Plekocheilus; Guilding, 1828

Type species
- Carychium undulatum Leach, 1814

Synonyms
- Antitragus Oberwimmer, 1931 (junior synonym); Auris (Antitragus) Oberwimmer, 1931 (junior synonymy); Auris (Eudolichotis) Pilsbry, 1896; Bulimus (Eurytus) Albers, 1850 (junior synonym); Bulimus (Plekocheilus) Guilding, 1827 (junior synonym); Caprella Guilding, 1824 (invalid: junior homonym of Caprella Lamarck, 1801; Plekocheilus is a replacement name); Eudolichotis Pilsbry, 1896; Eudolichotus [sic]; Euritis [sic]; Eurytus Albers, 1850 (junior synonymy); Orcesiellus Weyrauch, 1967; Pelekocheilus Beck, 1837 (junior synonymy); Plecocheilus Swainson, 1833 (junior synonymy); Plecocheilus (Eurytus) Albers, 1850; Plecocheilus (Plecocheilus) Swainson, 1833 (incorrect subsequent spelling); Plecochilus Agassiz, 1846 (unjustifed emendation); Plekocheilus (Aeropictus) Weyrauch, 1967· accepted, alternate representation; Plekocheilus (Eudolichotis) Pilsbry, 1896· accepted, alternate representation; Plekocheilus (Eurytus) Albers, 1850· accepted, alternate representation; Plekocheilus (Orcesiellus) Weyrauch, 1967 (junior synonymy); Plekocheilus (Plekocheilus) Guilding, 1827· accepted, alternate representation; Plekocheilus (Sparnotion) Pilsbry, 1944 (junior synonymy); Strophocheilus (Eurytus) Albers, 1850 (junior synonymy)

= Plekocheilus =

Genus of gastropods

Plekocheilus is a genus of air-breathing land snails, terrestrial pulmonate gastropod mollusks in the family Amphibulimidae.

== Distribution ==
This genus occurs in South America: Colombia, Venezuela, Brazil and Ecuador.

== Species ==
Species within the genus Plekocheilus include:

- Plekocheilus alticolus (F. Haas, 1955)
- Plekocheilus ampullaroides (Mousson, 1873)
- Plekocheilus annetae Breure, 2020
- Plekocheilus apunni (Dunker, 1875)
- Plekocheilus argenteus (Jousseaume, 1900)
- Plekocheilus aristaceus (Crosse, 1869)
- Plekocheilus aulacostylus (L. Pfeiffer, 1853)
- Plekocheilus aureonitens (K. Miller, 1878)
- Plekocheilus auriformis (da Costa, 1904)
- Plekocheilus aurissciuri Guppy, 1866
- Plekocheilus aurissileni (Born, 1780) - photo of radula
- Plekocheilus bellulus (Jonas, 1844)
- Plekocheilus bigener Borrero & Breure, 2011
- Plekocheilus blainvilleanus (Pfeiffer, 1848)
- Plekocheilus breweri Breure & Schlögl, 2010
- Plekocheilus bruggeni Breure, 1978
- Plekocheilus calliostomus (Dohrn, 1882)
- Plekocheilus camaritagua Borrero & Breure, 2011
- Plekocheilus cardinalis (Pfeiffer, 1853)
- Plekocheilus castaneus (Pfeiffer, 1845)
- Plekocheilus cathcartiae (Reeve, 1848)
- Plekocheilus cecepeus Breure & R. Araujo, 2015
- Plekocheilus coloratus (Nyst, 1845) - synonym: Plekocheilus lamarckianus (Pfeiffer, 1848)
- Plekocheilus conspicuus Pilsbry, 1932
- Plekocheilus dalmasi (Dautzenberg, 1900)
- Plekocheilus delicatus (Pilsbry, 1935)
- Plekocheilus dillwynianus (Pfeiffer, 1853)
- Plekocheilus dissimulans (Preston, 1909)
- Plekocheilus distortus (Bruguière, 1789) - in Brazil and Venezuela
- Plekocheilus doliarius (da Costa, 1898)
- Plekocheilus elaeodes (L. Pfeiffer, 1853)
- Plekocheilus episcopalis (Pfeiffer, 1855)
  - subspecies Plekocheilus episcopalis auriformis (Da Costa, 1904) - synonym: Plekocheilus auriformis (da Costa, 1904)
  - subspecies Plekocheilus episcopalis corticosus (Sowerby III, 1895)
- Plekocheilus eros (Angas, 1878)
- Plekocheilus euryomphalus (Jonas, 1844) - synonym: Plekocheilus otostomus (Pfeiffer, 1855), - in Venezuela
- Plekocheilus floccosus (Spix in J. A. Wagner, 1827)
- Plekocheilus fulminans (Nyst, 1843)
- Plekocheilus fusitorsus (Oberwimmer, 1931)
- Plekocheilus gibber (Oberwimmer, 1931)
- Plekocheilus gibbonius (Lea, 1838)
- Plekocheilus glaber (Gmelin, 1791)
- Plekocheilus glandiformis (Lea, 1838) - synonym: Plekocheilus (Eurytus) couturesi Ancey, 1900
- Plekocheilus guentheri (G.B. Sowerby III, 1892)
- Plekocheilus hauxwelli (Crosse, 1872)
- Plekocheilus huberi Breure, 2009
- Plekocheilus incognitus Borrero & Breure, 2011
- Plekocheilus jimenezi (Hidalgo, 1872)
- Plekocheilus jucundus (L. Pfeiffer, 1855)
- Plekocheilus labiosus Borrero & Breure, 2011
- Plekocheilus lacerta (Pfeiffer, 1855)
- Plekocheilus linterae(G.B. Sowerby III, 1890)
- Plekocheilus loveni (Pfeiffer, 1848)
- Plekocheilus lugubris (Dunker, 1882)
- Plekocheilus lynciculus (Deville & Hupé, 1850)
- Plekocheilus midas (Albers, 1852)
- Plekocheilus mundiperditi F. Haas, 1955
- Plekocheilus nachiyacu Pilsbry, 1939
- Plekocheilus nebulosus Breure, 2009
- Plekocheilus nocturnus Pilsbry, 1939
- Plekocheilus oligostylus Pilsbry, 1939
- Plekocheilus onca (d'Orbigny, 1835)
- Plekocheilus paraguas Borrero & Breure, 2011
- Plekocheilus pentadinus (d'Orbigny, 1835) - synonym: Helix onca d'Orbigny, 1835
- Plekocheilus perdix (Pfeiffer, 1848)
- Plekocheilus philippei Breure, 2012 in press
- Plekocheilus piperatoides Pilsbry, 1901
- Plekocheilus piperitus (G.B.Sowerby I, 1837)
- Plekocheilus pirriensis Dall, 1912
- Plekocheilus plectostylus (Pfeiffer, 1848) - synonym: Plekocheilus speciosus (Pfeiffer, 1854)
- Plekocheilus pulicarius (Reeve, 1848) - synonyms: Plekocheilus (Eurytus) virgatus (Pilsbry, 1935); Plekocheilus (Eurytus) mabillei (Crosse, 1867)
- Plekocheilus quadricolor (Pfeiffer, 1848)
- Plekocheilus rhodocheilus (Reeve, 1848)
- Plekocheilus roseolabrum (E. A. Smith, 1877)
- Plekocheilus sanderi Breure, 2020
- Plekocheilus semperi (Dohrn, 1882)
- Plekocheilus sinuatus (Albers, 1854)
- Plekocheilus sophiae Breure, 2009
- Plekocheilus subglandiformis (Mousson, 1873)
- Plekocheilus succineoides (Petit de la Saussaye, 1840) - synonym: Plekocheilus latilabris (Pfeiffer, 1855)
  - subspecies Plekocheilus succineoides cleeforum Breure, 1977
  - subspecies Plekocheilus succineoides zilchi Breure, 1977
- Plekocheilus superstriatus (G.B. Sowerby III, 1890)
- Plekocheilus taquinensis (Pfeiffer, 1855)
- Plekocheilus tatei (F. Haas, 1955)
- Plekocheilus taylorianus (Reeve, 1849)
- Plekocheilus tenuissimus Weyrauch, 1967
- Plekocheilus tetensii (Dunker, 1875)
- Plekocheilus tricolor (Pfeiffer, 1853)
- Plekocheilus taylorianus (Reeve, 1849)
- Plekocheilus veranyi (Pfeiffer, 1848) - synonym: Bulimus scytodes Pfeiffer, 1853
- Plekocheilus vlceki Breure & Schlögl, 2010

== Synonyms ==
- Plekocheilus ameghinoi Parodiz, 1962: synonym of Plekocheilus guentheri (G. B. Sowerby III, 1892) (junior synonym)
- Plekocheilus gracilis Broderip, 1841: synonym of Callistocharis fulguratus (Jay, 1842) (invalid: junior secondary homonym of Bulimus gracilis Hutton, 1834)
- Plekocheilus jacksoni Pilsbry, 1939: synonym of Plekocheilus lynciculus (Deville & Hupé, 1850) (junior synonymy)
- Plekocheilus manco Pilsbry, 1930: synonym of Plekocheilus veranyi (L. Pfeiffer, 1848) (junior synonymy)
- Plekocheilus mcgintyi H. B. Baker, 1963: synonym of Plekocheilus piperitus mcgintyi H. B. Baker, 1963 (original combination)
- Plekocheilus pseudopiperatus Pilsbry, 1895: synonym of Plekocheilus piperitus piperitus (G. B. Sowerby I, 1837) (junior synonym)
- Plekocheilus undulatus (Leach, 1814): synonym of Plekocheilus aurissileni (Born, 1780)
