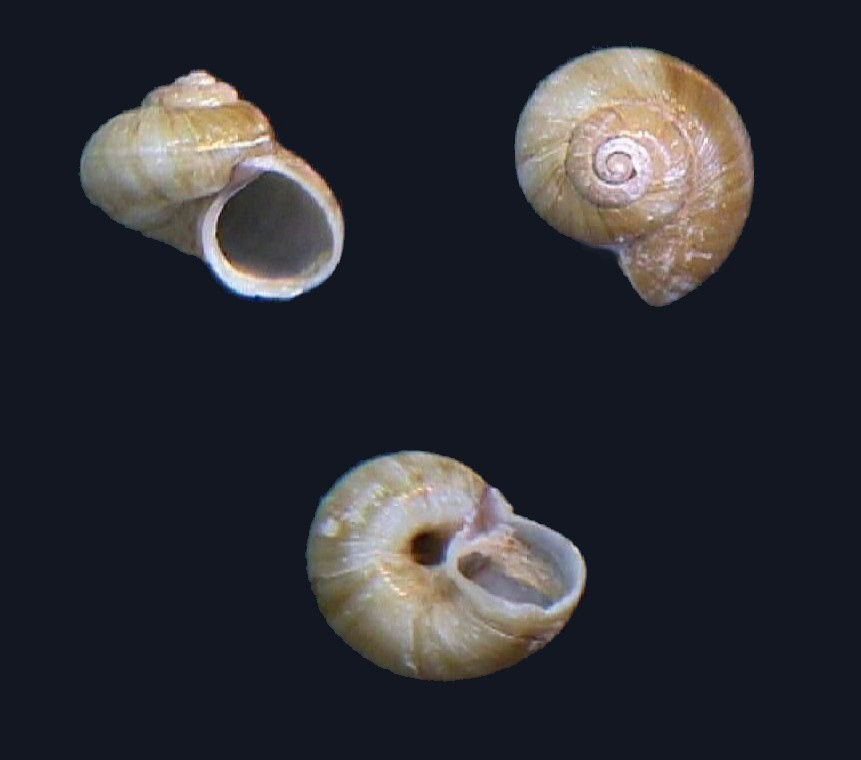
- Three views of a shell of Poteria translucida

Scientific classification
- Kingdom: Animalia
- Phylum: Mollusca
- Class: Gastropoda
- Subclass: Caenogastropoda
- Order: Architaenioglossa
- Family: Neocyclotidae
- Genus: Poteria
- Species: P. translucida

Binomial name
- Poteria translucida (Sowerby I, 1843)

= Poteria translucida =

Species of gastropod

Poteria translucida is a species of tropical land snail with gills and an operculum, a terrestrial gastropod mollusk in the family Neocyclotidae.

== Distribution ==
This species occurs in Venezuela
