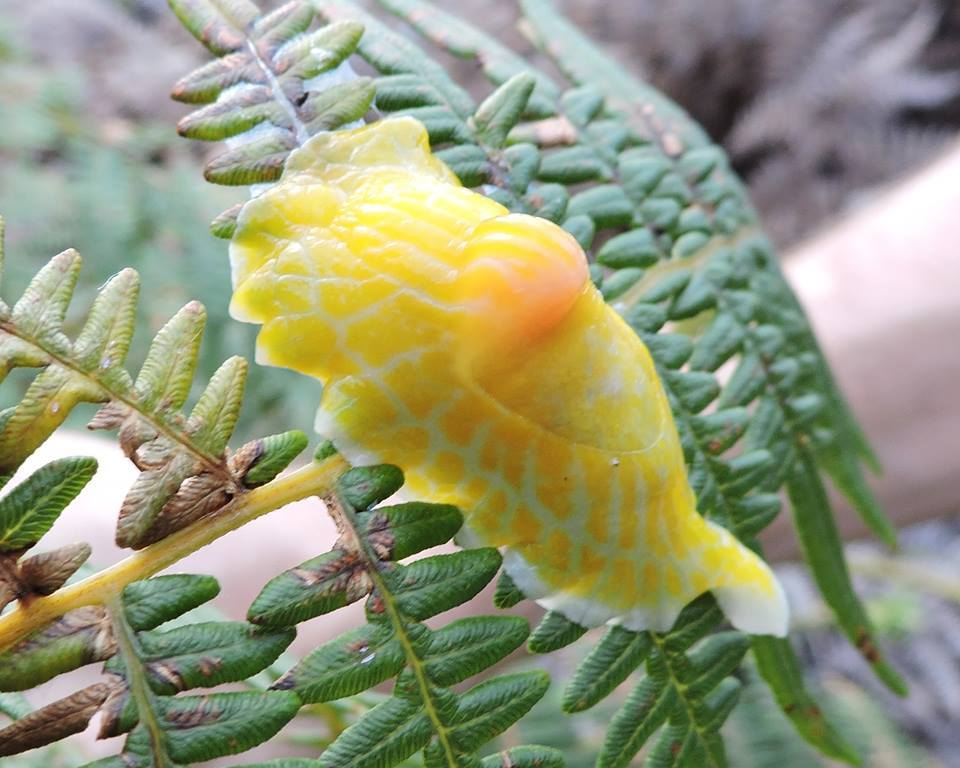
- A live individual of Peltella iheringi
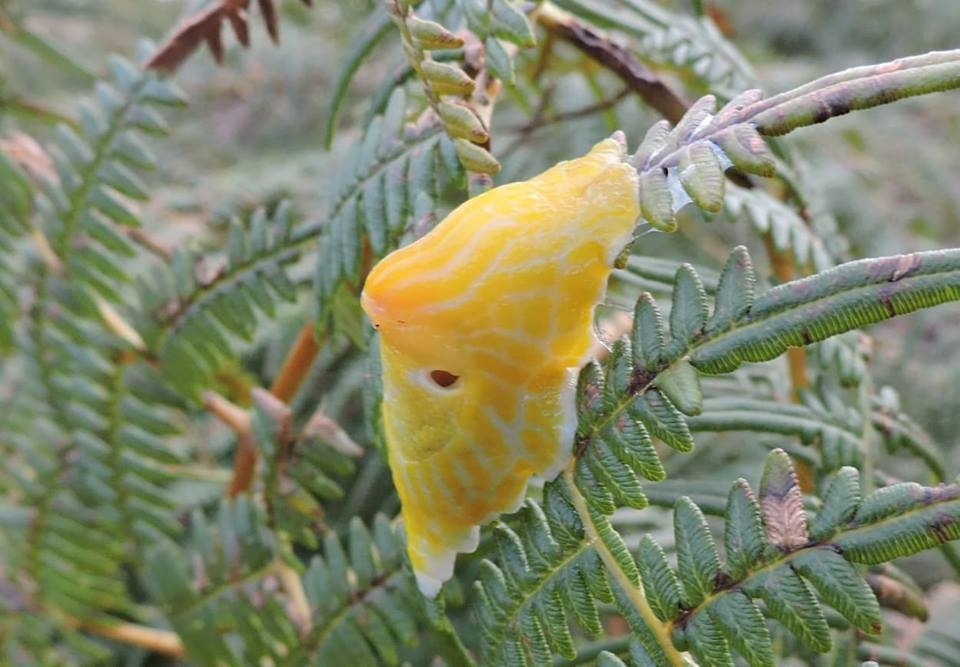
- P. Iheringi hanging on leaves on the slope of Serra do Mar, between Rio de Janeiro and São Paulo

Scientific classification
- Kingdom: Animalia
- Phylum: Mollusca
- Class: Gastropoda
- Order: Stylommatophora
- Family: Bulimulidae
- Genus: Peltella; Gray, 1855

Diversity
- See text
- Peltella is endemic to the tropical and subtropical forests of southeastern Brazil.

= Peltella =

Genus of gastropods

Peltella is a genus of air-breathing, tropical semi-slugs, terrestrial pulmonate gastropod molluscs in the family Bulimulidae. It occurs in the Atlantic neotropical South America, being endemic to the humid tropical and subtropical forests of southeastern Brazil. The animals have pale pink to yellow general body coloration with white streaks (e.g., Peltella iheringi) and are devoid of an external shell.

== Species ==
The genus includes the following species:

- Peltella palliolum (Férussac, 1821)
- Peltella iheringi Leme, 1968
