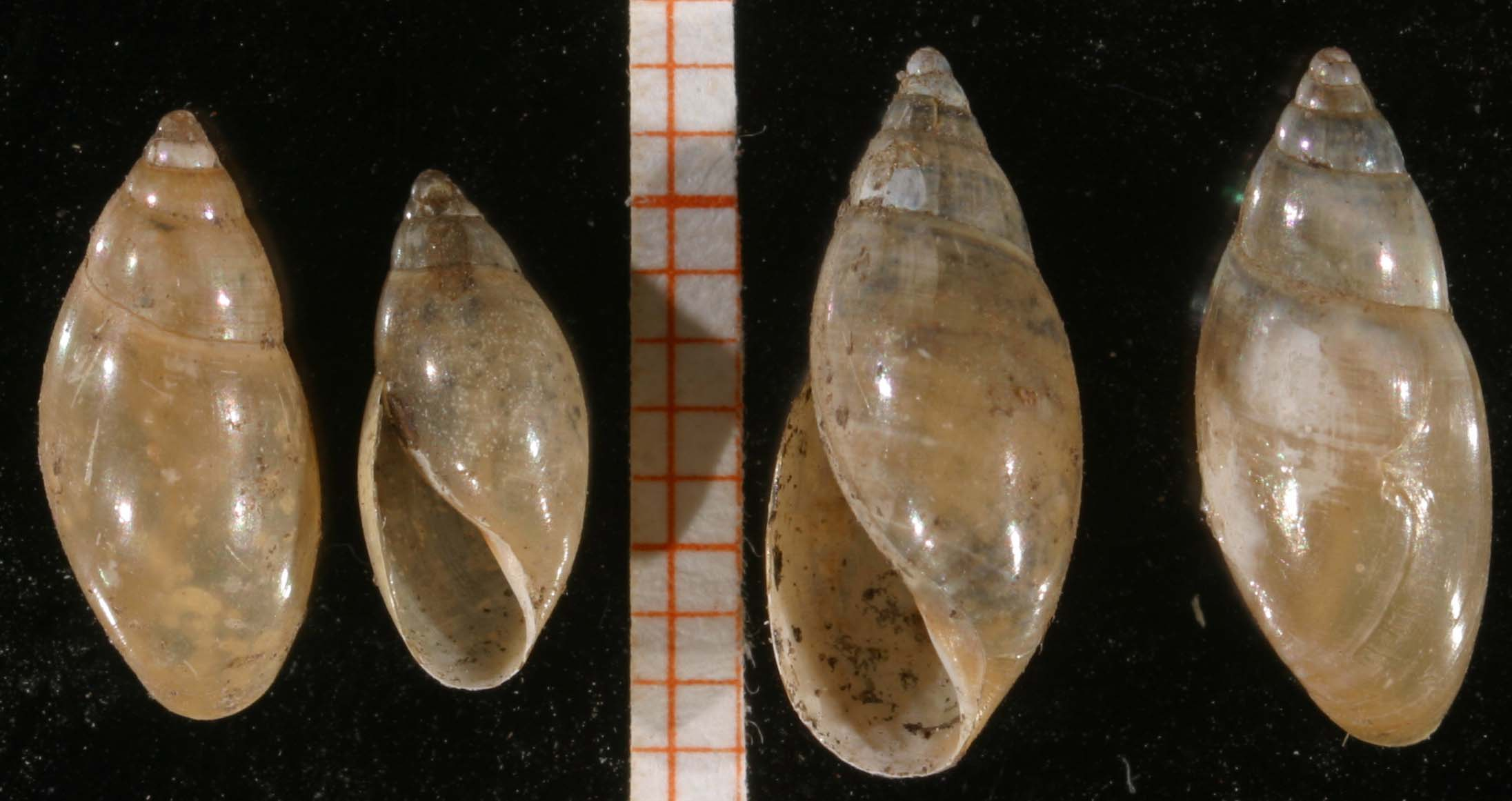
- Shells of Aplexa hypnorum

Scientific classification
- Kingdom: Animalia
- Phylum: Mollusca
- Class: Gastropoda
- Superorder: Hygrophila
- Family: Physidae
- Genus: Aplexa; Fleming, 1820

Type species
- Bulla hypnorum Linnaeus, 1758

Synonyms
- Aplecta Herrmannsen, 1846 (invalid: an incorrect subsequent spelling of Aplexa); Physa (Aplecta) Herrmannsen, 1846(invalid: an incorrect subsequent spelling of Aplexa)

= Aplexa =

Genus of gastropods

Aplexa is a genus of small, left-handed or sinistral, air-breathing freshwater snails, aquatic pulmonate gastropod mollusks in the family Physidae.

== Shell description ==
These small snails are quite distinctive, because they have shells that are sinistral, which means that if you hold the shell such that the spire is pointing up, then the aperture is on the left-hand side.

The shells of Aplexa species have a long and large aperture, a relatively high and pointed spire, and no operculum. The shells are thin and corneous and rather transparent.

Only two species are still extant.

== Species ==
Species in the genus Aplexa include:

- † Aplexa atava White, 1877
- † Aplexa breviturrita Y.-T. Li, 1983
- † Aplexa canculae Pacaud, 2022
- † Aplexa cotiensis Pacaud, 2022
- † Aplexa delicata Y.-T. Li, 1984
- † Aplexa disjuncta (White, 1879)
- † Aplexa dumonti (Briart & Cornet, 1887)
- † Aplexa fusioidea Tolstikova, 1979
- † Aplexa fuxinensis X.-H. Yu, 1987
- † Aplexa galloprovincialis (Matheron, 1843)
- † Aplexa gardanens (Matheron, 1843)
- † Aplexa gigantea (Michaud, 1837)
- † Aplexa grasseti (Matheron, 1878)
- † Aplexa heberti (Deshayes, 1863)
- Aplexa hypnorum (Linnaeus, 1758) - the moss bladder snail
- † Aplexa iota Pacaud, 2022
- † Aplexa jaimei (Hermite, 1879)
- † Aplexa kasekikabe (Isaji, 2010)
- † Aplexa lipasma Y.-T. Li, 1984
- † Aplexa lubrica W. Yü, 1965
- † Aplexa macerata (Russell, 1937)
- † Aplexa macilenta Y.-T. Li, 1983
- † Aplexa magna Y.-T. Li, 1984
- † Aplexa militaria (Yen & Reeside, 1946)
- † Aplexa montensis (Briart & Cornet, 1887)
- † Aplexa morrisonana (Yen & Reeside, 1946)
- † Aplexa morrisoni MacNeil, 1939
- † Aplexa normalis Y.-T. Li, 1985 (accepted > unreplaced junior homonym of Aplexa hypnorum normalis H. Beck, 1838; no replacement name or synonym known.
- † Aplexa oryza Pacaud, 2022
- † Aplexa panshanensis L.-S. Huang, 1987
- † Aplexa praelonga (Matheron ex Heer, 1861)
- † Aplexa preciosa Y.-T. Li, 1984
- † Aplexa primigenia (Deshayes, 1863)
- † Aplexa prisca (Noulet, 1854)
- † Aplexa pseudogigantea (F. Sandberger, 1870)
- † Aplexa pulchella (A. d'Orbigny, 1850)
- † Aplexa raris Y.-T. Li, 1984
- † Aplexa ricei (Russell, 1957)
- † Aplexa risleius Pacaud, 2022
- Aplexa rivalis (Maton & Rackett, 1807)
- † Aplexa subelongata (Meek & Hayden, 1856)
- † Aplexa subhypnorum (Gottschick, 1920)
- Aplexa venezuelensis (E. von Martens, 1859)
- † Aplexa xichuanensis Y.-T. Li, 1983
- † Aplexa yangxiensis Y.-T. Li, 1987
- † Aplexa zhui Pacaud, 2022

== Synonyms ==
- Aplexa adamsiana Tapparone Canefri, 1874: synonym of Glyptophysa novahollandica (Bowdich, 1822)
- Aplexa amurensis Starobogatov & Prozorova, 1989: synonym of Amuraplexa amurensis (Starobogatov & Prozorova, 1989) (superseded combination)
- Aplexa aurantia P. P. Carpenter, 1857: synonym of Mexinauta aurantius (P. P. Carpenter, 1857) (original combination)
- † Aplexa brevispirata (Cossmann & Pissaro, 1913): synonym of † Aplexa cotiensis Pacaud, 2022 (junior homonym of Physa (Isodora) tchadiensis brevispirata Germain, 1905; Aplexa cotiensis Pacaud, 2022 is a replacement name)
- † Aplexa cylindrica Yen, 1935: synonym of † Pseudophysa cylindrica (Yen, 1935) (superseded combination)
- Aplexa elongata (Say, 1821) - the lance aplexa: synonym of Sibirenauta elongata (Say, 1821)
- † Aplexa grabaui Yen, 1935: synonym of † Pseudophysa grabaui (Yen, 1935) (superseded combination)
- Aplexa marmorata (Guilding, 1828): synonym of Stenophysa marmorata (Guilding, 1828) (superseded combination)
- Aplexa microstriata Chamberlin & E. G. Berry, 1930: synonym of Utahphysa microstriata (Chamberlin & E. G. Berry, 1930): synonym of Physella gyrina (Say, 1821) (original combination)
- Aplexa moskvichevae Starobogatov & Zatravkin, 1989: synonym of Amuraplexa amurensis (Starobogatov & Prozorova, 1989)
- Aplexa orientalis Starobogatov & Prozorova, 1989: synonym of Amuraplexa amurensis (Starobogatov & Prozorova, 1989)
- † Aplexa ovicylindrica Youluo, 1978 (unavailable name)
- Aplexa princeps (J. S. Phillips, 1846): synonym of Mexinauta princeps (J. S. Phillips, 1846) (superseded combination)
- † Aplexa rivalis (Maton & Rackett, 1807): synonym of Physella acuta (Draparnaud, 1805) (junior synonym)
- † Aplexa robusta Eames, 1952: synonym of † Limacina robusta (Eames, 1952) (original combination)
- Aplexa tapanensis (Crosse & P. Fischer, 1882): synonym of Mayabina tapanensis (Crosse & P. Fischer, 1882) (unaccepted combination)
- Aplexa turrita Tate, 1881: synonym of Glyptophysa novahollandica (Bowdich, 1822) (junior synonym)
