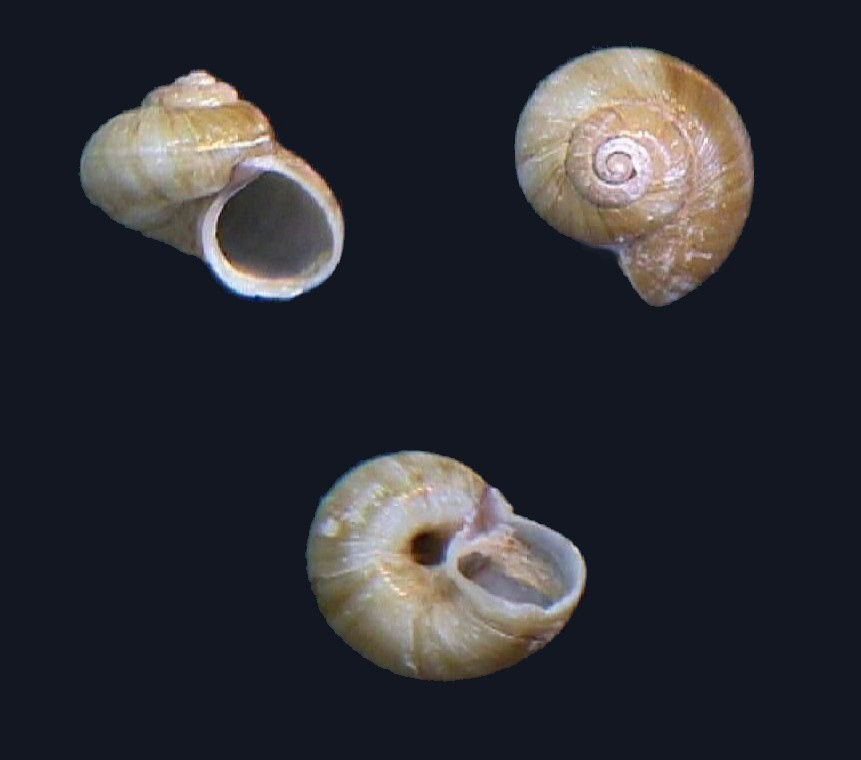
- Three views of a shell of Poteria translucida

Scientific classification
- Kingdom: Animalia
- Phylum: Mollusca
- Class: Gastropoda
- Subclass: Caenogastropoda
- Order: Architaenioglossa
- Family: Neocyclotidae
- Genus: Poteria; Gray, 1850

Synonyms
- Poteria Gray, 1840 nomen nudum

= Poteria =

Genus of gastropods

Poteria is a genus of tropical land snails with gills and an operculum, terrestrial gastropod mollusks in the family Neocyclotidae.

== Species ==
Species within the genus Poteria include:

- Poteria fasciatum
- Poteria translucida
