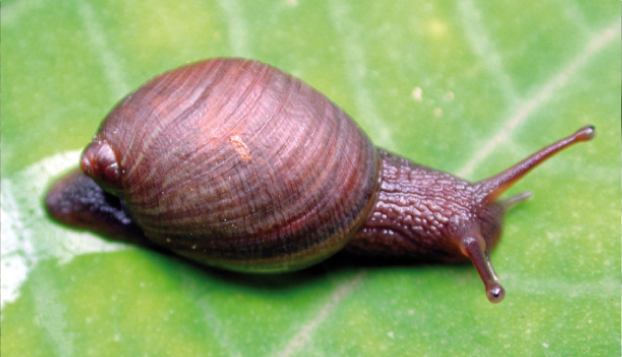
- Amphibulima patula dominicensis

Scientific classification
- Kingdom: Animalia
- Phylum: Mollusca
- Class: Gastropoda
- Order: Stylommatophora
- Suborder: Helicina
- Superfamily: Orthalicoidea
- Family: Amphibulimidae; P. Fischer, 1873

Diversity
- From 17 (including Peltella) to at least 80 species (Amphibulima 4 species, Dryptus at least ~7 species, Gaeotis at least 1 species, Pellicula at least 1 species, Plekocheilus at least ~67 species)

Synonyms
- Amphibuliminae P. Fischer, 1873

= Amphibulimidae =

Family of gastropods

Amphibulimidae is a taxonomic family of land snails in the superfamily Orthalicoidea.

== Distribution ==
Amphibulimidae lives across the northern part of South America (Colombia, Venezuela, Brazil, Ecuador), Central America and the West Indies (Guadeloupe, Dominica, Martinique).

== Taxonomy ==
=== 2005 ===
This taxon was placed as a subfamily Amphibuliminae within the family Orthalicidae according to the taxonomy of the Gastropoda (Bouchet & Rocroi, 2005). There was classified also semi-slug Peltella Gray, 1855 within Amphibuliminae and Peltellinae Gray, 1855 was considered as a synonym of Amphibuliminae.

=== 2010 ===
Breure et al. (2010) elevated Amphibuliminae to Amphibulimidae.

=== 2012 ===
Breure & Romero (2012) removed Peltella to subfamily Peltellinae within Bulimulidae.

== Genera ==
Genera within the family Amphibulimidae include:

- Amphibulima Lamarck, 1805 - type genus of the subfamily Amphibuliminae
- †Cortana R. B. Salvador & Simone, 2013
- Dryptus Albers, 1860
- Gaeotis Shuttleworth, 1854
- Pellicula P. Fischer, 1856
- Plekocheilus Guilding, 1828
- Rhodonyx P. Fischer, 1873
