= Karl Ludwig Pfeiffer =

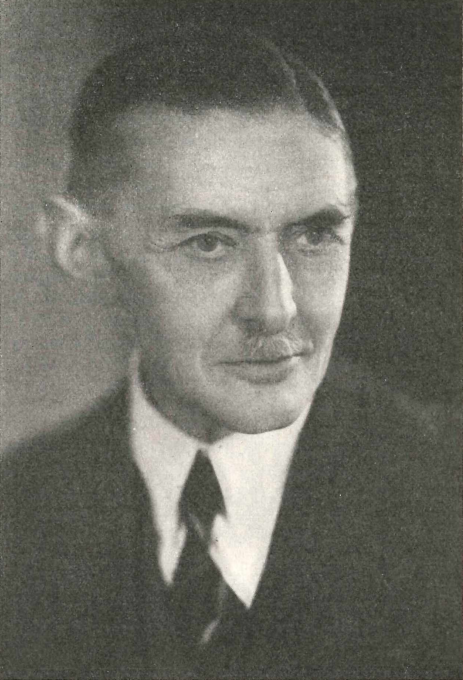
- Karl Pfeiffer in 1935
- Born: 5 September 1874; Kassel, Hesse-Nassau, Kingdom of Prussia
- Died: 14 June 1952 (aged 77); Kassel, Hesse, Germany
- Education: University of Berlin
- Awards: Iron Senckenberg Medal (1927)
- Scientific career
- Fields: Malacology; Conchology
- Author abbrev. (zoology): K. L. Pfeiffer.

Karl Ludwig Pfeiffer (September 5, 1874 – June 14, 1952) was a German malacologist, banker, and patron of the arts.

== Early life ==
Karl Ludwig Pfeiffer was born in Kassel to the banker August Ludwig Heinrich Pfeiffer (November 3, 1845 – 1892) and his wife Regine Amalie Wilhelmine Georgine Louise (née Hellwig; March 25, 1849 – 1932). He was the couple's eldest child and only son. He was not a particularly studious child, but he did express an interest in the natural world from an early age. When he was thirteen, Karl spent several months at Norderney in the East Frisian Islands recovering from a respiratory illness, and he credited his burgeoning interest in malacology and conchology to the many days he spent alone there, collecting shells along the deserted sea coast. He brought his shell collection back with him to Kassel, where his father noticed this new interest. At this point, August introduced Karl to Clessin's Deutsche Excursions-Mollusken-Fauna, the works of Haeckel and Darwin, and finally explained to Karl the extensive work done in the field by his uncle Louis Pfeiffer and his great-grandfather Carl Jonas Pfeiffer. Learning of this strong familial connection, Karl himself later asserted that it must have been his very nature that brought him to study the natural sciences. Sadly, this dream of a career in science was not to be. By 1894, when Karl was only 19, his father and grandfather had both died, and the family's banking interests were being run by a single, aging uncle, who only agreed to continue in his role if Karl also joined the firm to assist him. As a result, Karl formally joined the family firm on 15 March 1893, before his 20th birthday.

== Banking career and later life ==
After joining the family firm, Karl was sent to the Deutsche Bank in Berlin to train as a bank teller, and it was there that he made the acquaintance of Oskar Boettger and Wilhelm Kobelt, whose friendship and influence would allow him some time to spend studying mollusks. Indeed, it was during a trip to the Alps during this time that Karl decided to write and publish his first scientific paper, on Tandonia nigra. In 1894, he was to spend a year in Frankfurt as a volunteer banking teller, where he himself admitted he spent more time studying mollusks than on his banking studies, largely due to the influence of his friends Boettger and Kobelt. This short interlude was to end in another tragedy, when was struck by a serious illness in January of 1895, forcing him to cut his time in Frankfurt short and return to Kassel for treatment and recovery. By the end of that year, Karl was sent to study Classical economics in Berlin and Paris, and this, paired with his recent and lingering illness, quashed what little energy he had to pursue his scientific interests. Karl eventually completed an apprenticeship with the Disconto-Gesellschaft, after which he traveled and worked in various banks in America, London and Paris. By 1899, he was fully-accredited co-owner of Bankhaus L. Pfeiffer. He embraced his role in civil society, undertaking board memberships at various organizations and wading into the world of art. Beginning in 1907, Karl was the founding chairman of the Art Association (Kunstverein) of Kassel, and under his leadership, the Avant-garde movement was first introduced to that city. His fellow board members included Johannes Boehlau, Otto Ehrenberg, and Franz Thorbecke.

After the death of his uncle Louis Pfeiffer (not the malacologist) in 1912, Karl became the director and sole proprietor of Bankhaus L. Pfeiffer. In this position, he guided the bank through some turbulent times in Germany's history. Under Karl's leadership, the bank managed to survive the First World War and the subsequent Weimar Hyperinflation, but with the coming of the Great Depression, the small bank simply lacked the capital to survive as an independent entity. It was one of the last holdouts in Kassel, but by 1930, the firm had been acquired by Deutsche Bank, of whose Cassel bureau Karl Pfeiffer would be president of until 1934.

Karl was appointed to the Kassel Chamber of Commerce in 1913, and following the death of Otto Vogt in 1921, he was elected chairman of the Chamber - a post that his grandfather and uncle had held before him. He served in this position for twelve years. During his tenure, the chamber district grew rapidly through a series of geopolitical mergers. In 1924, the Free State of Waldeck, and in 1932, Mühlhausen, Thuringia, were added to the Kassel Chamber of Commerce's purview. From 1924, the organization's name had been changed to Chamber of Industry and Commerce. When the Nazis seized power in 1933, Pfeiffer was removed from the chairmanship. The government took advantage of a vacation trip to Madeira to promote Nazi functionary Rudolf Braun to the chairmanship in Pfeiffer's absence. After Karl's protests against this were unsuccessful, he bowed to the facts and resigned. During the period of National Socialism, Pfeiffer kept away from all public offices. In 1935, to add insult to injury, Pfeiffer was removed from his position at the head of the Kunstverein and classified by the Nazi government as an "undesirable (unerwünschte) person."> After World War II, he was reappointed as chamber president by the occupying power in April 1945. Due to his age, however, he resigned again as early as July 1945 and Gustav Römer became his successor.

== Return to malacology ==
Despite his early interest and initial forays into publishing on scientific subjects, the unfortunate tragedies that led to Karl's swift jump into banking meant that his scientific interests had to take a back seat to his primary career of banking. Ironically, his rise in control of the family's banking concern gave him more control over his free time, and he chose to use that time revive his true passion: malacology. By 1924, Karl had purchased the shell collections of Theodor Johannes Krüper, Robert Jetschin, and Caesar Rudolf Boettger, his friend Oskar Boettger's nephew. He also continued to travel extensively, to Italy, Spain, Egypt, Algeria, Tunisia, the Balkans and the Dodecanese and Canary Islands. This renewed interest in the natural sciences, paired with his loss of position due to the rise of the Nazi Party, meant that Karl had more time than he knew what to do with, so in 1937 he embarked on a months-long collection trip to East Africa, out of which the majority of his taxonomic work would come, and in 1939 a second collection trip to Java and the East Indies. In his own words, Karl Pfeiffer's single greatest regret in life is that he had not acquired the formal scientific background and training necessary for someone to truly pursue a career in scientific inquiry, which he no doubt would have done, had the circumstances of his early life been different. In 1927, Pfeiffer was given an honorary Doctorate by the Philosophy faculty of the University of Marburg for his contribution to the arts and sciences. In the same year, he was further recognized and honored for his contribution by the Senckenberg Nature Research Society, which presented him with an Iron Senckenberg Medal. By the end of his career, Karl Pfeiffer had identified and named dozens of species and genera of mollusks, and over thirty of those names stand today.

== Mollusks described by Pfeiffer ==
- Albinaria brevicollis kosensis K.L. Pfeiffer, 1955.
- Bloyetia simulans meruensis K.L. Pfeiffer, 1952.
- Chilostoma cingulatum alzonai K.L. Pfeiffer, 1951.
- Chilostoma cingulatum boccavallense K.L. Pfeiffer, 1951.
- Euonyma connollyana K.L. Pfeiffer, 1952.
- Gonaxis cylindrica K.L. Pfeiffer, 1952.
- Gulella (Gulella) conicodentata K.L. Pfeiffer, 1952.
- Gulella globosa K.L. Pfeiffer, 1952.
- Gulella gouldi globosa K.L. Pfeiffer, 1952.
- Gulella (Molarella) gwendolinae porrecta K.L. Pfeiffer, 1952.
- Gulella (Paucidentina) micrans K.L. Pfeiffer, 1952.
- Gulella (Paucidentina) percivali kilimae K.L. Pfeiffer, 1952.
- Gulella (Gulella) translucida K.L. Pfeiffer, 1952.
- Gulella (Paucidentina) unidentata K.L. Pfeiffer, 1952.
- Gulella (Paucidentina) usambarica K.L. Pfeiffer, 1952.
- Gulella ludwigi K.L. Pfeiffer, 1952.
- Homorus usambaricus K.L. Pfeiffer, 1952.
- Homorus usagaricus monticulus K.L. Pfeiffer, 1952.
- Hypolysia connollyana K.L. Pfeiffer, 1952.
- Levantina spiriplana kanaanensis K.L. Pfeiffer, 1949.
- Maizania pyramidalis K.L. Pfeiffer, 1952.
- Maizania volkensi (von Mts.) K.L. Pfeiffer, 1952.
- Subulina usambarica K.L. Pfeiffer, 1952.
- Subulina usagarica monticula K.L. Pfeiffer, 1952.
- Pseudoglessula (Kempioconcha) monticula K.L. Pfeiffer, 1952.
- Pupisoma renschi K.L. Pfeiffer, 1952.
- Edentulina (Marconia) cylindrica K.L. Pfeiffer, 1952.
- Tandonia nigra K.L. Pfeiffer, 1894.
- Tayloria angustistriata K.L. Pfeiffer, 1952.
- Trachycystis lamellosa K.L. Pfeiffer, 1952.
- Trochonanina (Montanobloyetia) simulans meruensis K.L. Pfeiffer, 1952.
