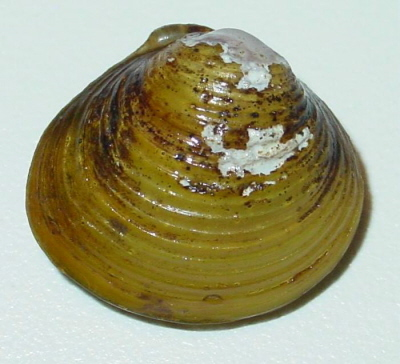

Conservation status
- Least Concern (IUCN 3.1)

- Secure (NatureServe)

Scientific classification
- Kingdom: Animalia
- Phylum: Mollusca
- Class: Bivalvia
- Order: Venerida
- Superfamily: Cyrenoidea
- Family: Cyrenidae
- Genus: Corbicula
- Species: C. fluminea

Binomial name
- Corbicula fluminea (O. F. Müller, 1774)

Synonyms
- Tellina fluminea O. F. Müller, 1774 (original combination)

= Corbicula fluminea =

Species of mollusc

Corbicula fluminea is a species of freshwater clam native to eastern Asia which has become a successful invasive species throughout the world, including North America, South America, Europe, and New Zealand. It is native to freshwater environments of Eastern Asia, including Russia, Thailand, Cambodia, the Philippines, China, Taiwan, Korea, and Japan. C. fluminea also occurs naturally in freshwater environments of Africa. Corbicula fluminea is commonly known in the west as the Asian clam, Asiatic clam, or Asian gold clam. In Southeast Asia, C. fluminea is known as the golden clam, prosperity clam, pygmy clam, or good luck clam. In New Zealand, it is commonly referred as the freshwater gold clam.

Right and left valve of the same specimen:

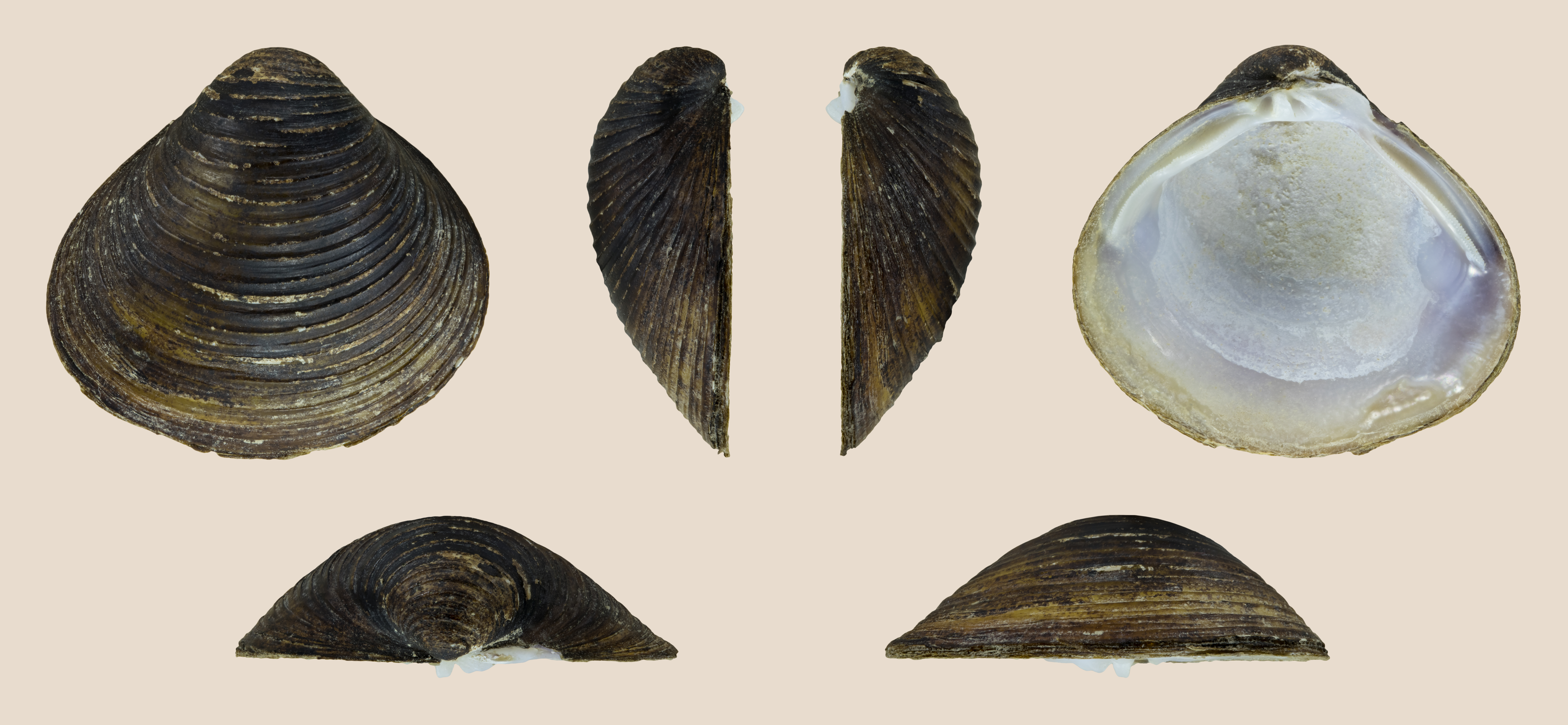
Right valve

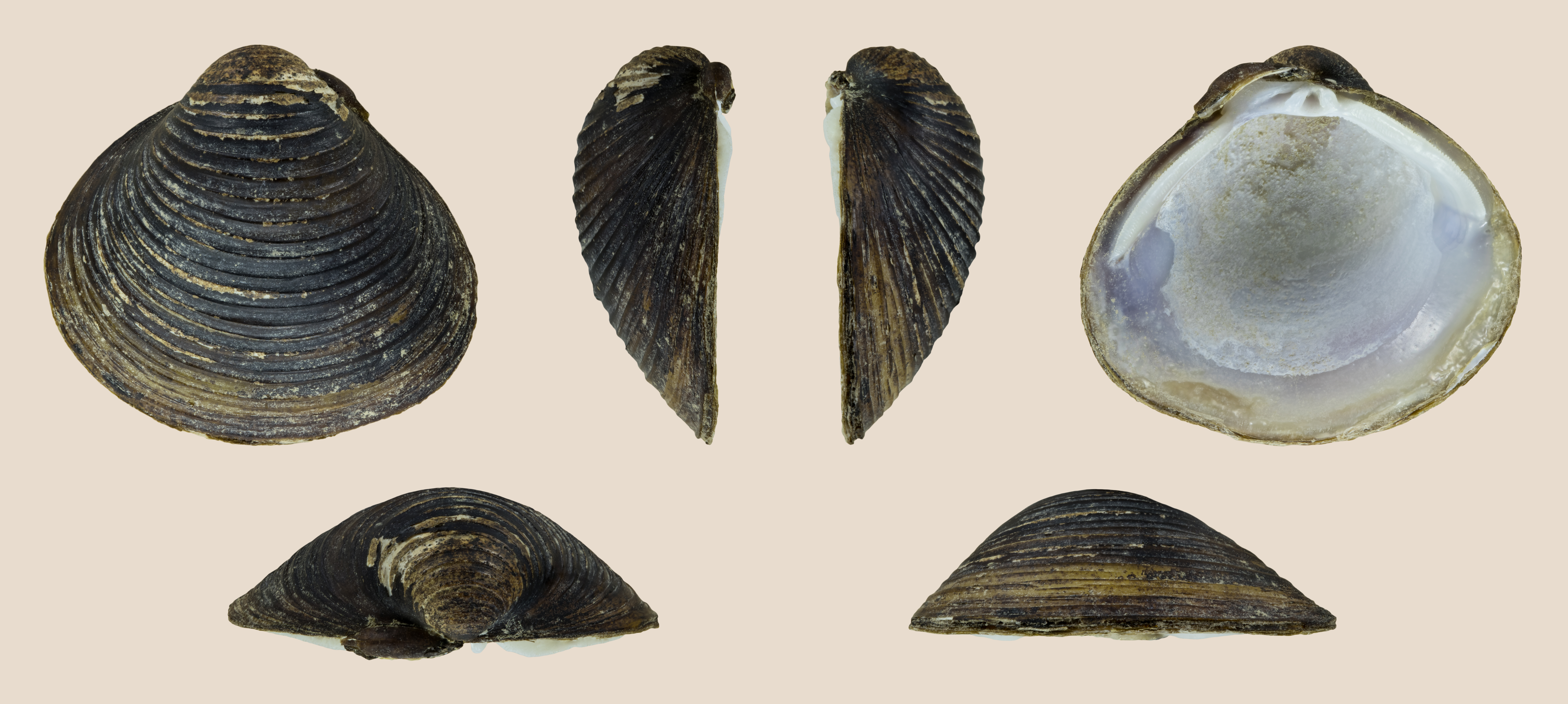
Left valve

== Overview ==
Corbicula have had global success as an aquatic invasive species, having been introduced to a novel range including South America, North America and Europe. Human industrial activity, such as transport of larvae via ballast water in container ships, has been noted in the literature as a chief invasion vector. A market exists for Asian clams for human consumption in Japan, China, and other countries in the region. According to the United States Geological Survey, C. fluminea is likely to continue to expand its North American range until it reaches the maximum extent of its low temperature tolerance. The periostracum of the shell is normally yellow-green, brown, or black with concentric growth rings of the prismatic layer visible through the proteinous outer layer. The periostracum can flake, allowing the white prismatic layer to show through. The shells exhibit a light purple nacre on the inside.

As a filter feeder, Corbicula strains suspended contents of nearby water and absorbing material to feed itself. Large quantities of toxins are absorbed in their gut, accumulating high concentrations of toxins. The clams excrete large quantities of inorganic chemicals, such as nitrogen and phosphorus, after feeding off sediment. Despite edibility of Corbicula in native countries, Coribicula sourced from New Zealand's Waikato River is considered not safe to eat, as caused by pollution in the river.

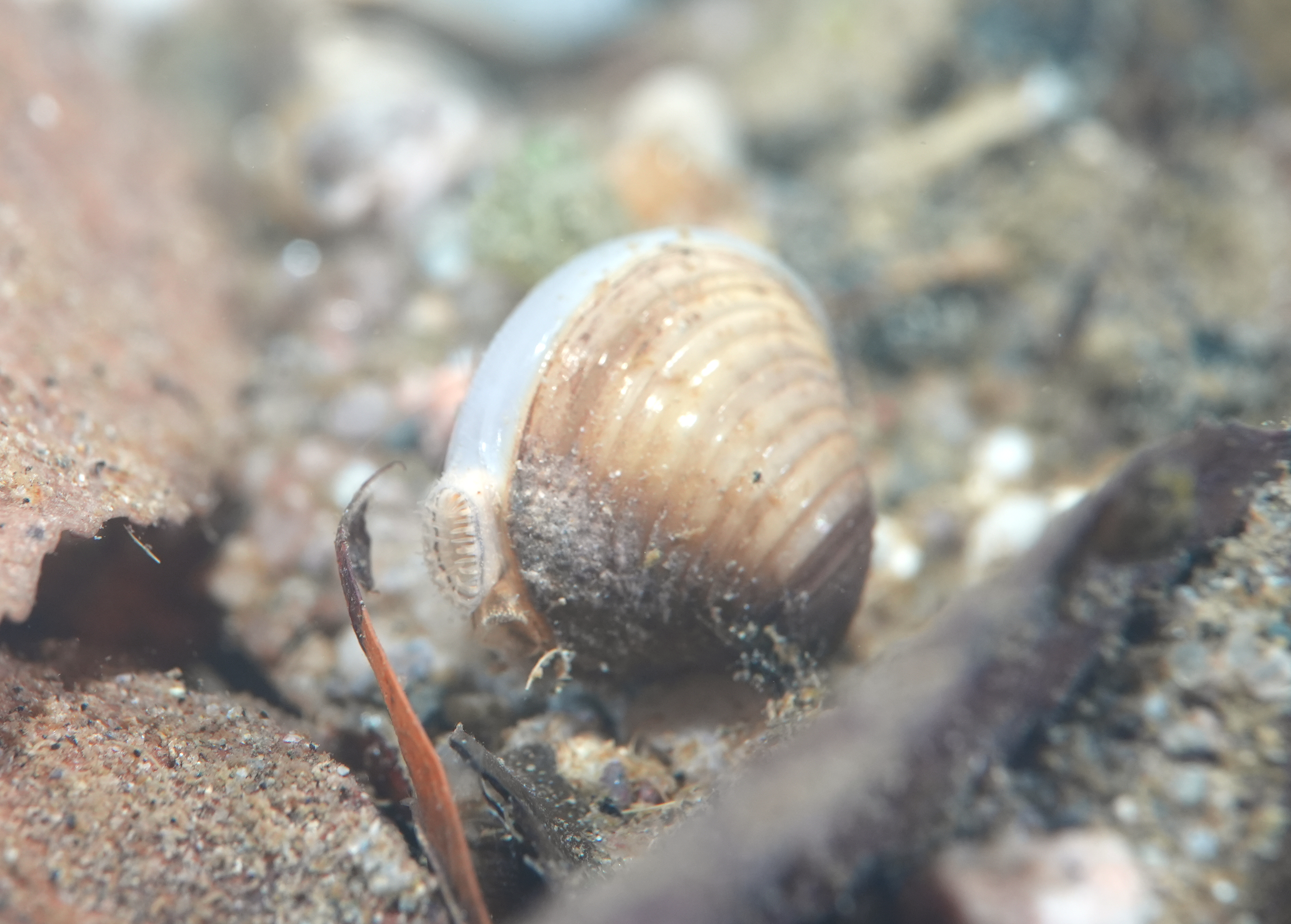
Corbicula fluminea with siphon

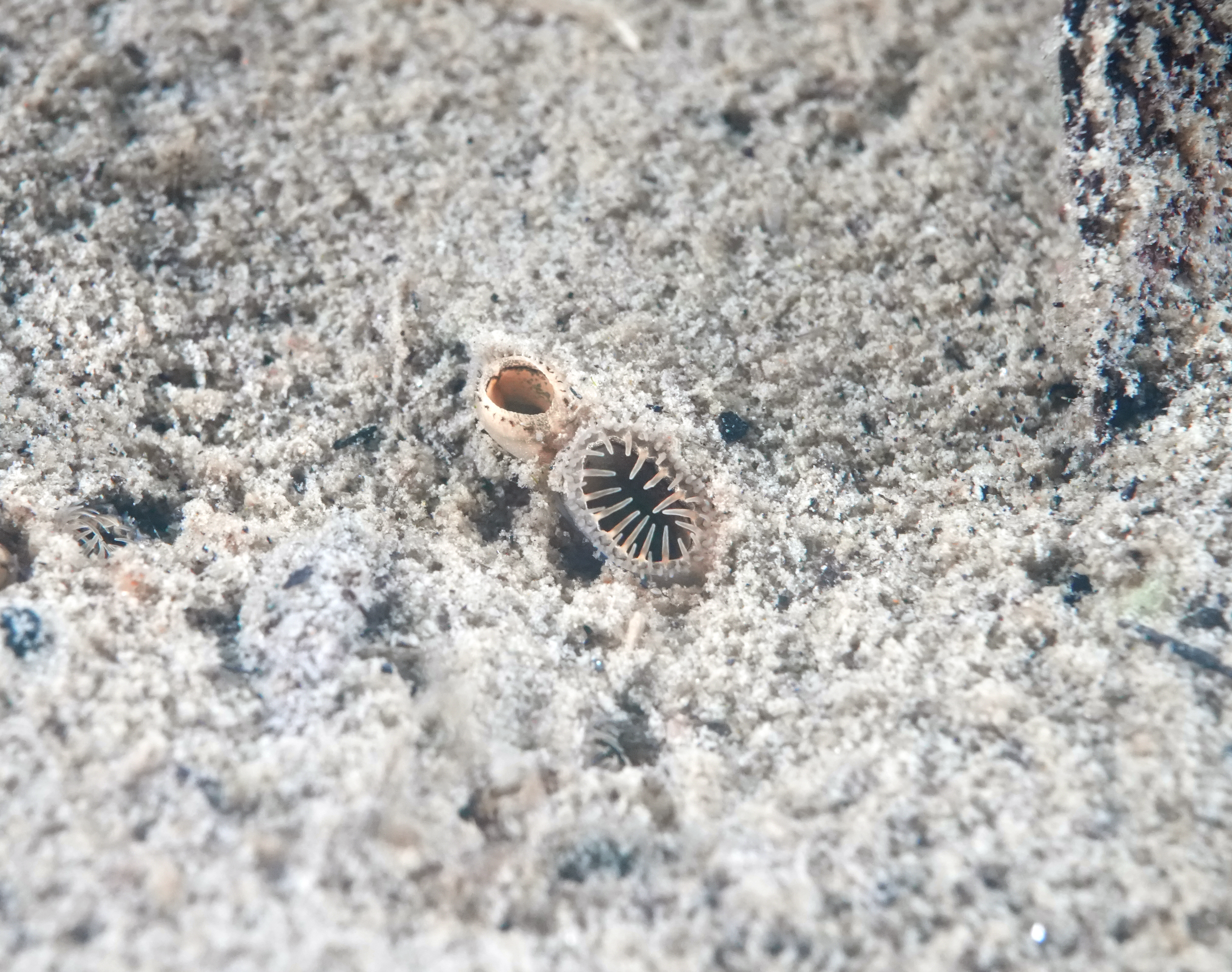
Burrowed Corbicula fluminea

Corbicula is a successful breeder in the rivers and lakes of many countries in the world, breeding densely in localized water, and transported elsewhere via water currents or by the movement of humans and their waterborne apparatus. This allows them to outcompete against native invertebrates, including mollusks such as mussels, for phytoplankton as food. Corbicula has shown to interfere with water-based infrastructure created by humans, such as water treatment and hydroelectric dams, by clogging them up.

=== Life cycle ===
Right after reaching maturity, these clams produce eggs, followed by sperm. Throughout adult life, Corbicula is a self-fertile simultaneous hermaphrodite which can broadcast spawn up to 570 mucoid larvae per day per individual, and more than 68,000 per year per individual. Larvae are ~200 microns in length when discharged from an adult and dispersed through water until becoming sessile adults. Adults can reach a length of about 5 centimetres (2.0 in).

=== Feeding ===
Corbicula fluminea is an active suspension feeder, and in the process of feeding by pumping water through its body (as well as feeding on interstitial sedimentary material via pedal feeding when suspended grazing items are limited). They feed primarily on phytoplankton (algae), which they actively filter out the water, but may pedal feed on organic matter in the sandy or muddy bottoms of streams, lakes, or canals where the clam establishes a population.

== Taxonomy ==
Corbicula fluminea vs Corbicula fluminalis

Corbicula fluminea is a species of freshwater clam, an aquatic bivalve mollusk in the family Cyrenidae. C. fluminea is often confused with Corbicula fluminalis due to the two species' similar color and texture. Two species may be present in some introduced populations: C. fluminea and C. fluminalis. The names themselves are sometimes confused in the literature (e.g. by being called "Corbicula fluminata").

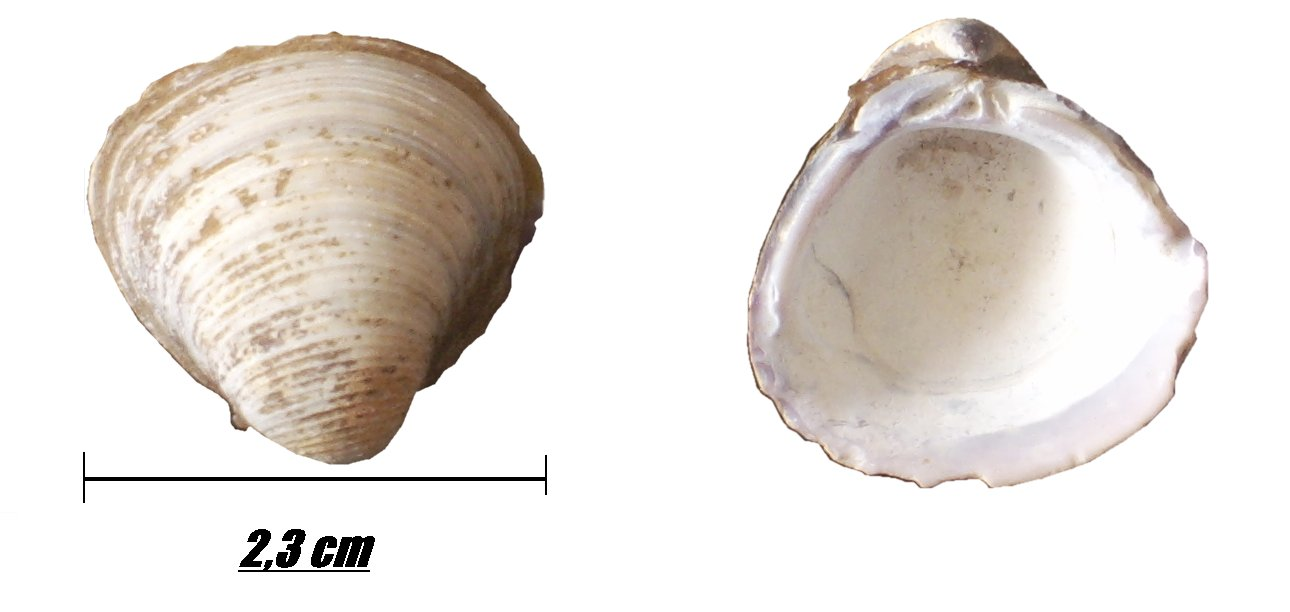
Corbicula fluminalis

The ratio of width and height in C. fluminea is on average 1.1. In C. fluminalis it is smaller (0.97); still, there is much variation and considerable overlap in shape. Most easily, they can be distinguished by the number of ribs on the shell; C. fluminea has 7 to 14 ribs per cm, C. fluminalis 13 to 28. This character is already clearly recognizable (albeit only by direct comparison) in very small (5 mm diameter) specimens. In addition, when viewed from the ventral side (looking at the opening between the shells), C. fluminalis is rounder, almost heart-shaped, while C. fluminea has a slightly flatter shape like a teardrop with a notched broad end. Small specimens of C. fluminalis are almost spherical, while those of C. fluminea are decidedly flattened. All these differences except the rib number are a consequence of C. fluminalis having a markedly more swollen, pointed and protruding umbo.

Molecular data confirm that the invasive lineage known as "form A/R" (COI haplotype FW5) corresponds to C. fluminea. Corbicula iravadica Blanford, 1881 is treated as a junior synonym of C. fluminea based on molecular and morphological evidence.

== Range ==
=== As a native species ===
This clam originally occurs in freshwater environments of Eastern Asia, including Russia, Thailand, Cambodia, the Philippines, China, Taiwan, Korea, and Japan. C. fluminea also occurs naturally in freshwater environments of Africa.

=== As an invasive species ===
Many coastal rivers with a heavy industrial shipping presence in the invaded range of C. fluminea sustain Asian clam populations. Various non-indigenous populations of C. fluminea include:

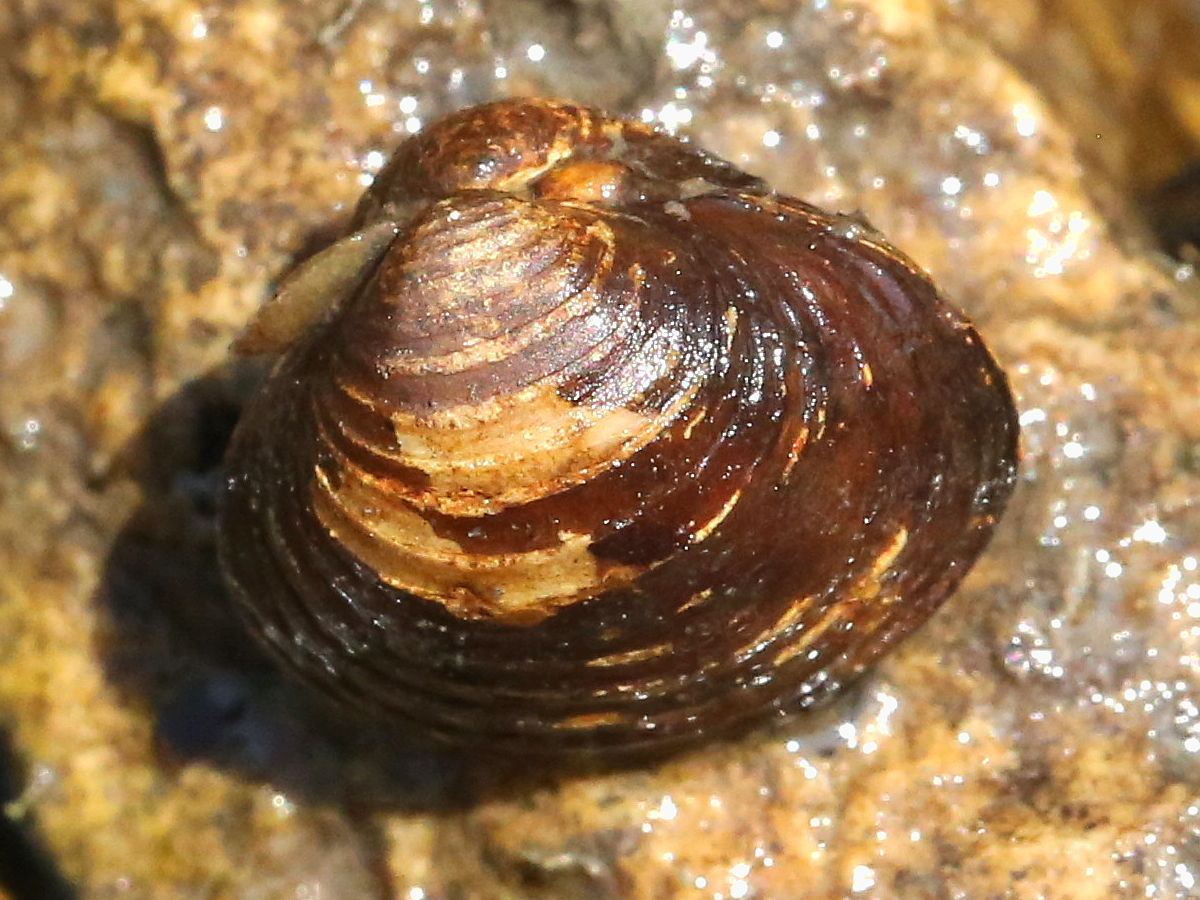
In Naperville, Illinois, USA

- British Columbia circa 1924, and now more widespread
- The Columbia River in the northwest United States in 1938
- United Kingdom, first discovered in 1998 in the River Chet, Norfolk Broads. Found in River Thames in 2004.
- Cuba
- Lake Tahoe, on the borders of California and Nevada, they were first found in 2002, and the numbers increased rapidly after 2008.
- Lake George, NY, USA
- South America, including Argentina, Uruguay, Brasil (Río de La Plata basin, Río Amazonas Basin, Patagonia - Río Colorado, Río Negro- and is currently in expansion), Perú, Venezuela and Ecuador (Guayas, Daule, Vinces, Quevedo, and Babahoyo River drainages).
- Germany's Rhine River in the late 1980s
- Danube River through the Rhine-Main-Danube Canal
- It reached the Elbe in 1998 at the latest
- River Nore & Barrow, Republic of Ireland, first recorded in April 2010
- Czech Republic - in Elbe in Bohemia since 2000 and it is spreading. It was found in Morava River in south Moravia in 2018.
- Slovakia
- Minho River in Portugal
- Between August 15–28, 2020 in Briggs Lake in Minnesota; however UMN Extension does not believe they are able to naturally survive in Minnesota, instead surviving only in the higher temperatures of power plant coolant water
- Shuswap Lake, British Columbia, Canada in 2020
- Found in the Pend d'Oreille River in British Columbia, a tributary of the Columbia, in the spring of 2021
- First discovered in the Waikato River in the Waikato Region of New Zealand, in May 2023. Ministry of Primary Industries along with the Waikato Regional Council had found the species at Bob's Landing, Lake Karapiro – upriver from Hamilton, New Zealand's fourth most populous city, and more than 150 km from the mouth of the river. The clams have successfully colonized throughout a portion of the Waikato River. As a precaution against further spread of the clams, numerous lakes and rivers were closed off, and many other regions have installed mandatory QR codes and permanent washing stations.

== Means of dispersal ==
=== Human vectors ===
Human activities are the chief reason for the wide dispersal of C. fluminea as an invasive aquatic organism. Its global invasion probably started with Asian immigration in North America during the 1920s, as it was used as food source by these communities. Corbicula fluminea, along with other exotic bivalve larvae, may be accidentally transported via ballast water or recreational boaters. Furthermore, the species is common in the aquarium trade and can be intentionally or unintentionally released in the wild by aquarists.

=== Life history advantages ===
Corbicula fluminea enjoys several physiological capabilities which are advantageous in promoting its invasion of novel lentic/lotic environments including:

- Rapid individual growth rate
- Short time to reach sexual maturity
- Short lifespan paired with high fecundity
- Fast rate of water filtration for suspension feeding
- Ability to broadcast gametes over a broad area by utilizing water flow (in rivers)
- Tolerance of a wide variety of substrate/habitat types

Corbicula fluminea is a self-fertilizing, simultaneous hermaphrodite which can asexually produce internally-brooded, semi-buoyant planktonic larvae when spermiogenesis is induced at temperatures above 10 °C (50 °F). This allows C. fluminea to colonize novel habitats at an advanced rate.

=== Habitat association ===
Studies on which abiotic habitat characteristics are most strongly associated with Asian clam population abundance have produced varying results. Brazilian habitats have been found to have support the largest abundances of invasive Corbicula spp. in areas with coarser dominant sediment fractions, while negatively correlated with increasing levels of organic matter.

Other studies have shown abiotic habitat characteristics such as water redox potential, inorganic nutrient content, hardness, and organic matter content in tandem with the amount of very coarse sand combine to explain 59.3% of Corbicula population habitat association via statistical tests.

Asian clam invasions seem to be limited by elevation (88% of the invaded range is below 500m elevation), latitude (90% lies between latitudes 30°and 55°) as well as the minimum winter temperature (−10 °C (14 °F)) of the ecosystem.

In 2001 it was identified in Puerto Rico from a collected specimen back in 1998, 18° of latitude.

=== Impacts on invaded ecosystems ===
Corbicula fluminea reworks the sediments it resides on through the process of bioturbation. Asian clams are considered biodiffusors similar to marine clam species due to their observed bioturbation activity which may negatively affect other members of the benthic community in invaded areas. Excessive excretion of inorganic chemicals such as nitrogen and phosphorus imbalance concentrations of oxygen in the water, encouraging the growth of algae and cyanobacteria, as a byproduct of the excretion of these clams.

Corbicula has also been shown to profoundly influence community dynamics within the macrobenthos of invaded systems. Corbicula has been shown to remove as much as 70% of phytoplankton biomass in reaches of invaded rivers with a robust clam population. The clam has also been reported as causing a decline of dissolved oxygen in the water of the same river system with wide-ranging second-order effects.

The primary economic and social impact of the invasion of C. fluminea has been billions of dollars in costs associated with clogged plumbing and, heat exchangers, or other human-created infrastructure. Ecologically, C. fluminea contributes to declines and replacement of highly vulnerable, already threatened native clams.

=== Global invasion pattern ===
The first recorded instance of Corbicula presence in the scientific literature in the Western Hemisphere was of its introduction into British Columbia circa 1924, followed by a spread throughout the Pacific Northwest and across the American south through South America. Invasions in Europe and Central America were more recent, first appearing in Caribbean countries in 1998.

Corbicula was discovered in New Zealand along a stretch of the Waikato River in May 2023. According to the Ministry of Primary Industries, the clams have likely populated in the river for several years prior to discovery. Based on patterns of unsuccessful eradication of Corbicula overseas, eradication of Corbicula is predicted to be near-impossible in New Zealand.

=== Mitigation ===
They have been blamed for algal blooms and concerns exist they will outcompete and displace native species such as the montane pea clam (Pisidium spp.) and the ramshorn snail (Planorbidae). Efforts are underway at Lake Tahoe to smother the clams on the bottom with rubber mats. In August 2020 routine inspections in Wyoming found several watercraft to be heavily infested including one with C. fluminea. On October 16, 2020, the Montana Department of Fish, Wildlife and Parks recommended that Lake Elmo — in Billings — be drained to dry out and freeze to death the C. fluminea there.

== See also ==
- List of introduced molluscs species of Venezuela
