= Sabulina =

Sabulina may refer to:

- Sabulina (plant), a genus of plants in the family Caryophyllaceae
- Sabulina (foraminifera), a genus of foraminifers in the family Ataxophragmiidae
- Sabulina, a genus of gastropods in the family Achatinidae, synonym of Subulina
