= Barbarofusus =

Scientific classification
- Kingdom: Animalia
- Phylum: Mollusca
- Class: Gastropoda
- Subclass: Caenogastropoda
- Order: Neogastropoda
- Family: Fasciolariidae
- Subfamily: Fusininae
- Genus: Barbarofusus; Grabau & Shimer, 1909

Type species
- * † Fusus barbarensis Trask, 1855: Heilprinia (Barbarofusus) Grabau & Shimer, 1909 superseded rank

Synonyms
- Fusinus (Barbarofusus) Grabau & Shimer, 1909

Genus of gastropods

Barbarofusus is a genus of sea snails, marine gastropod mollusks in the family Fasciolariidae, the spindle snails, the tulip snails and their allies.

== Species ==
Species within the genus Barbarofusus include:

- † Barbarofusus barbarensis (Trask, 1855)
- Barbarofusus guadalupensis Callomon & Snyder, 2017
- Barbarofusus kobelti (Dall, 1877)

Species brought into synonymy

- Barbarofusus chocolatus Okutani, 1983: synonym of Fusinus chocolatus (Okutani, 1983)
