= List of introduced molluscs of Venezuela =

Map showing the location of Venezuela

This is a list of 52 species of molluscs that have been introduced into Venezuela, that are living in the wild, and that have been reported in the literature.

- Marine gastropods: 7 species
- Freshwater gastropods: 5 species
- Land gastropods: 22 species
- Marine bivalves: 18 species
- Estuarine bivalves: 2 species
- Total number of introduced mollusc species: 52

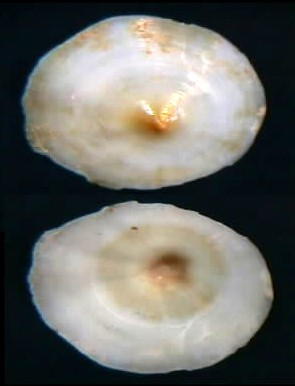
Outer and inner views of a shell of Umbraculum plicatulum

== Gastropoda ==
=== Marine gastropods ===
Buccinidae

- Babylonia areolata (Link, 1807)

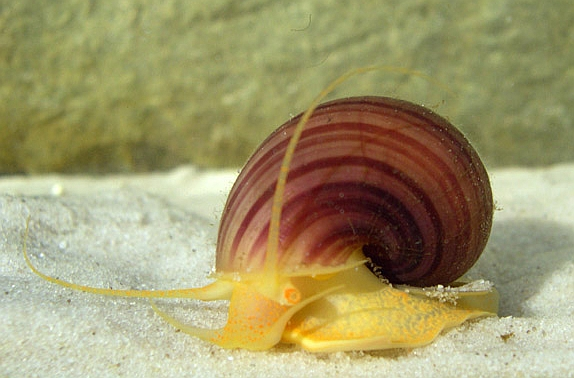
A live individual of Pomacea bridgesi

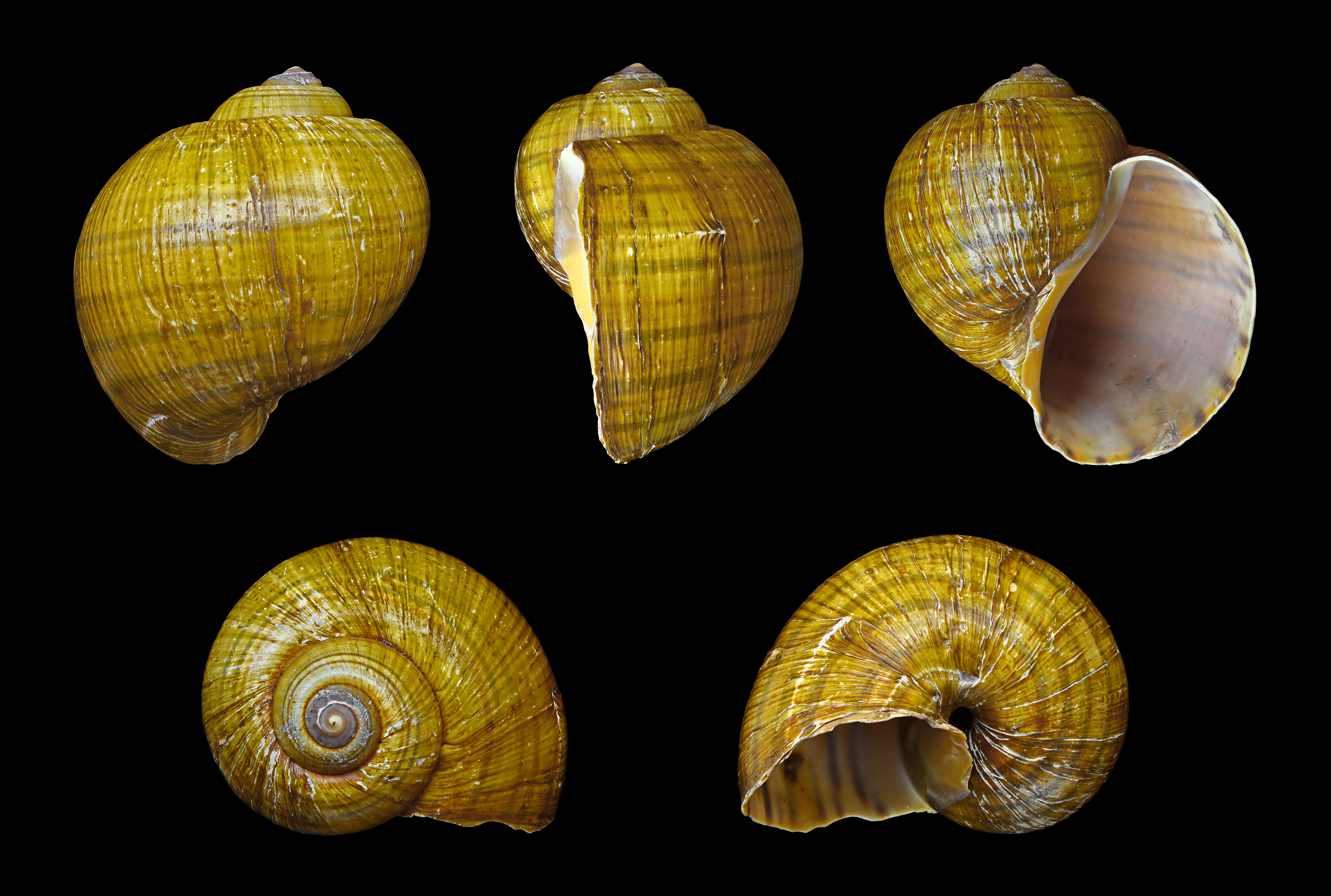
Five views of a shell of Pomacea canaliculata

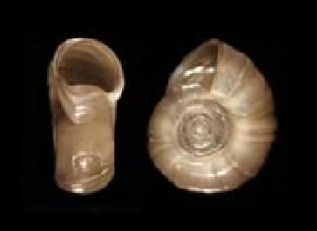
Two views of a shell of Planorbella duryi

Fasciolariidae

- Fusinus barbarensis (Trask, 1855)
- Fusinus marmoratus (Phillipi, 1844)

Modulidae

- Modulus cerodes (A. Adams, 1851)

Turbinellidae

- Vasum ceramicum (Linnaeus, 1758)

Umbraculidae

- Umbraculum plicatulum (Von Martens, 1881)

=== Freshwater gastropods ===
Ampullariidae

- Pomacea bridgesii (Reeve, 1856)
- Pomacea canaliculata (Lamarck, 1819)

Planorbidae

- Planorbella duryi (Wetherby 1879)

Thiaridae

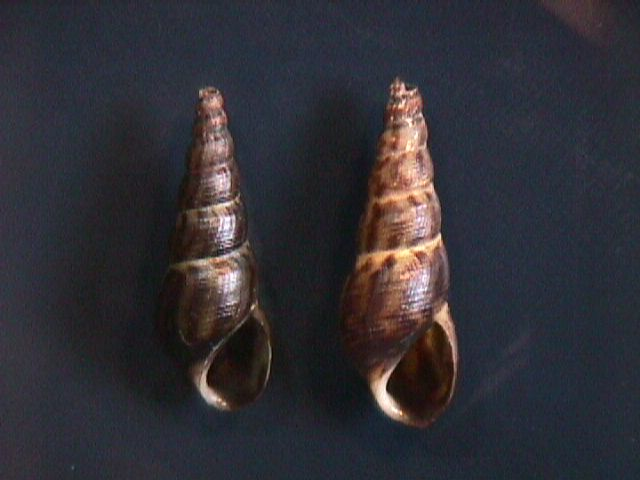
Two shells of Melanoides tuberculata

- Melanoides tuberculata (Müller, 1774)
- Thiara granifera (Lamarck, 1822)

=== Land gastropods ===
Achatinidae

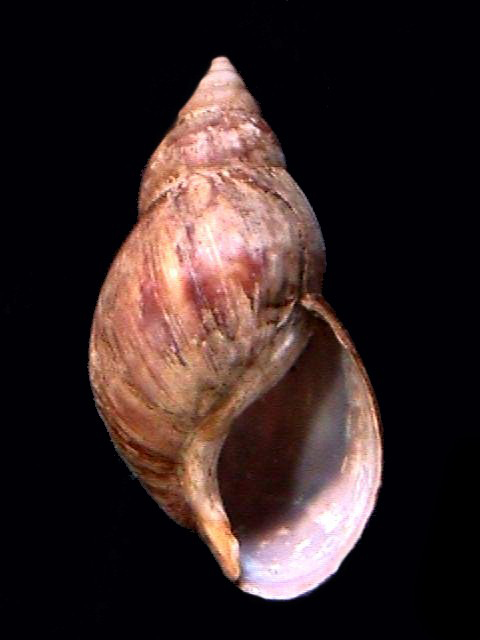
A shell of Achatina fulica

- Achatina fulica (Bowdich, 1822)

Arionidae

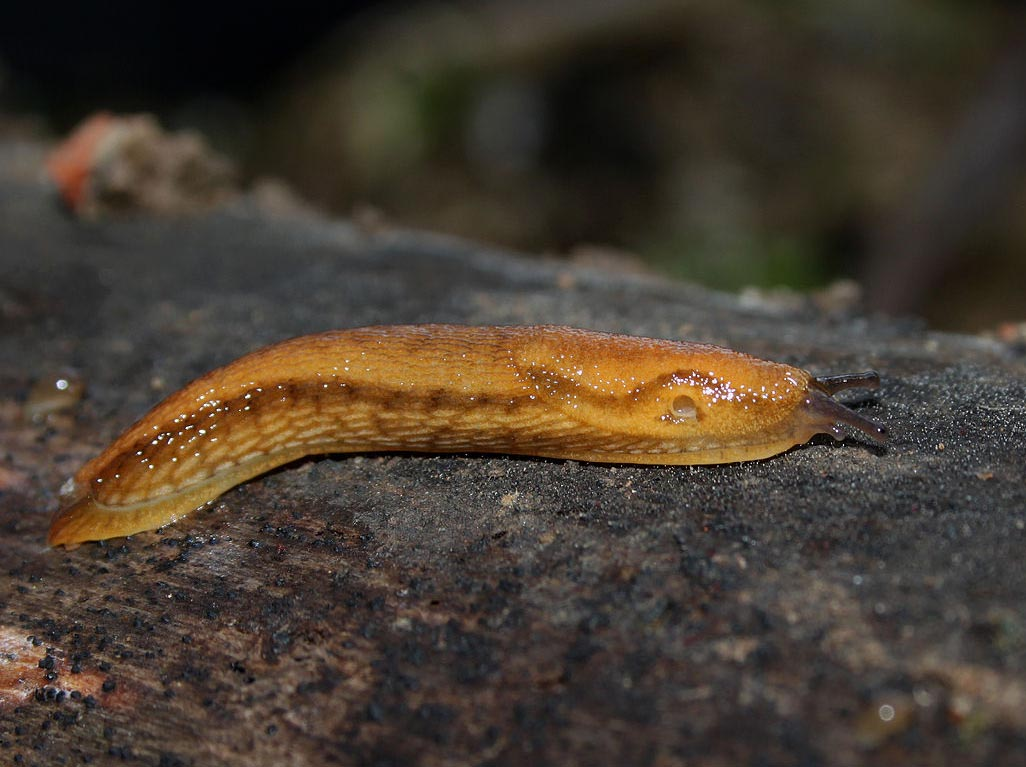
An active individual of Arion subfuscus

- Arion subfuscus (Draparnaud, 1805)

Bradybaenidae

- Bradybaena similaris (Fèrussac, 1821)

Ferussaciidae

- Cecilioides acicula (Müller 1774)
- Cecilioides aperta (Swainson, 1840)

Helicidae

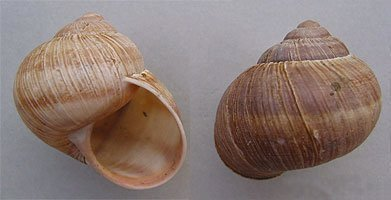
Two shells of Helix pomatia

- Cepaea Held, 1838
- Cornu aspersum = Helix aspersa (Müller, 1774)
- Helix pomatia Linnaeus, 1758
- Otala Schumacher, 1817
- Theba pisana (Müller, 1774)

Limacidae

- Agriolimax laevis (Müller, 1774)
- Deroceras reticulatum (Müller, 1774)
- Lehmannia valentiana (Férussac, 1822)
- Milax gagates (Draparnaud)

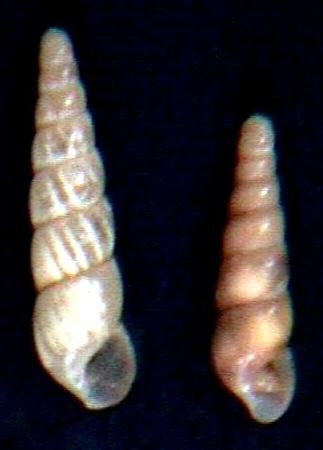
A shell and a live individual of Subulina octona

Streptaxidae

- Gulella bicolor (Hutton, 1834)

Subulinidae

- Allopeas micra (d'Orbigny, 1835)
- Lamellaxis mauritianus (Pfeiffer, 1952)
- Opeas gracile (Hutton, 1834)
- Opeas pumilum (Pfeiffer, 1847)
- Opeas pyrgula Schmacker and Boettger, 1891
- Subulina octona (Bruguière, 1798)
- Subulina striatella (Rang, 1831)

== Bivalvia ==
=== Marine bivalves ===
Arcidae

- Arca pacifica (Sowerby, 1833)

Donacidae

- Donax clathratus (Revee, 1854)

Mactridae

- Mactronella exoleta (Gray, 1837)
- Rangia mendica (Gold, 1851)

Mytilidae

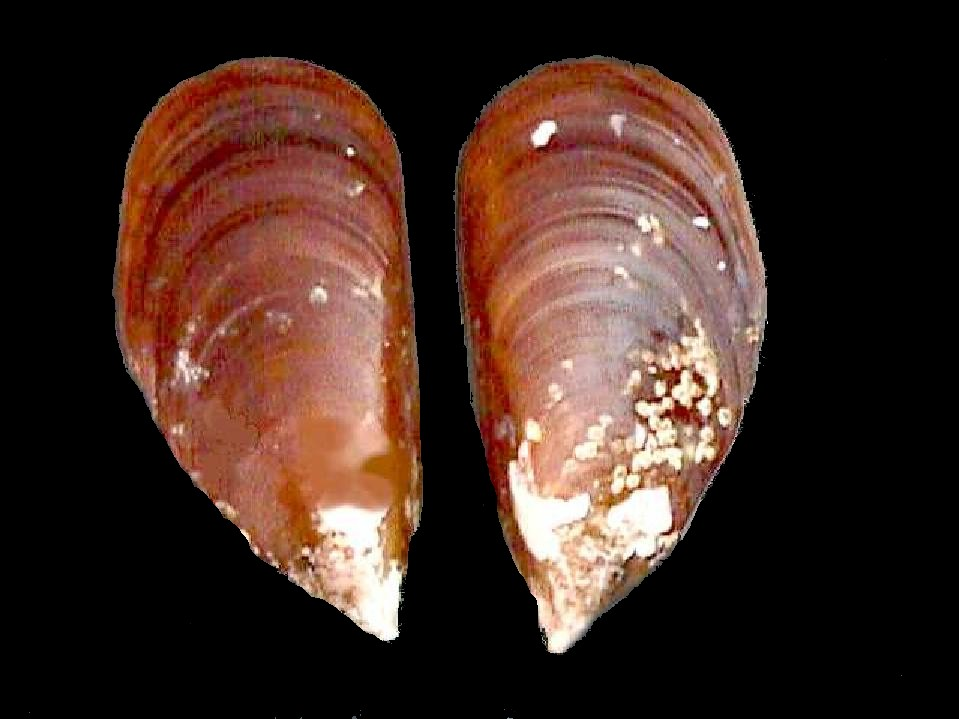
A shell of Perna perna

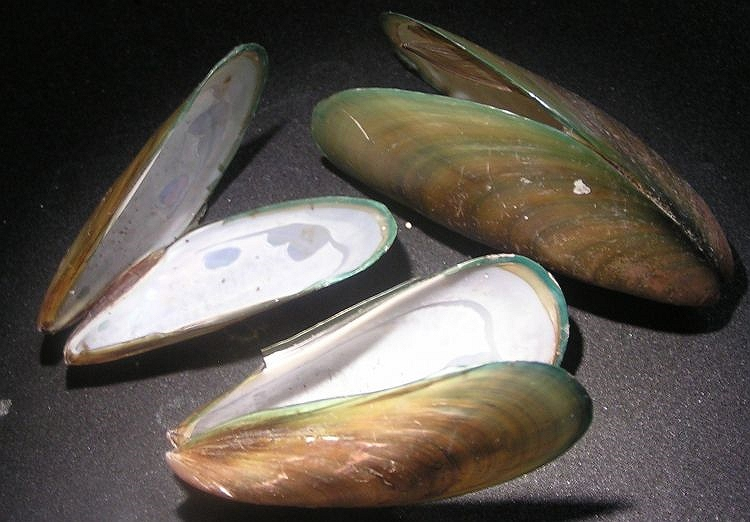
Three shells of Perna viridis

- Gregariella coralliophaga (Gmelin 1781)
- Perna perna (Linnaeus, 1758)
- Perna viridis (Linnaeus, 1758)

Placunidae

- Placuna placenta Linnaeus, 1758

Pteriidae

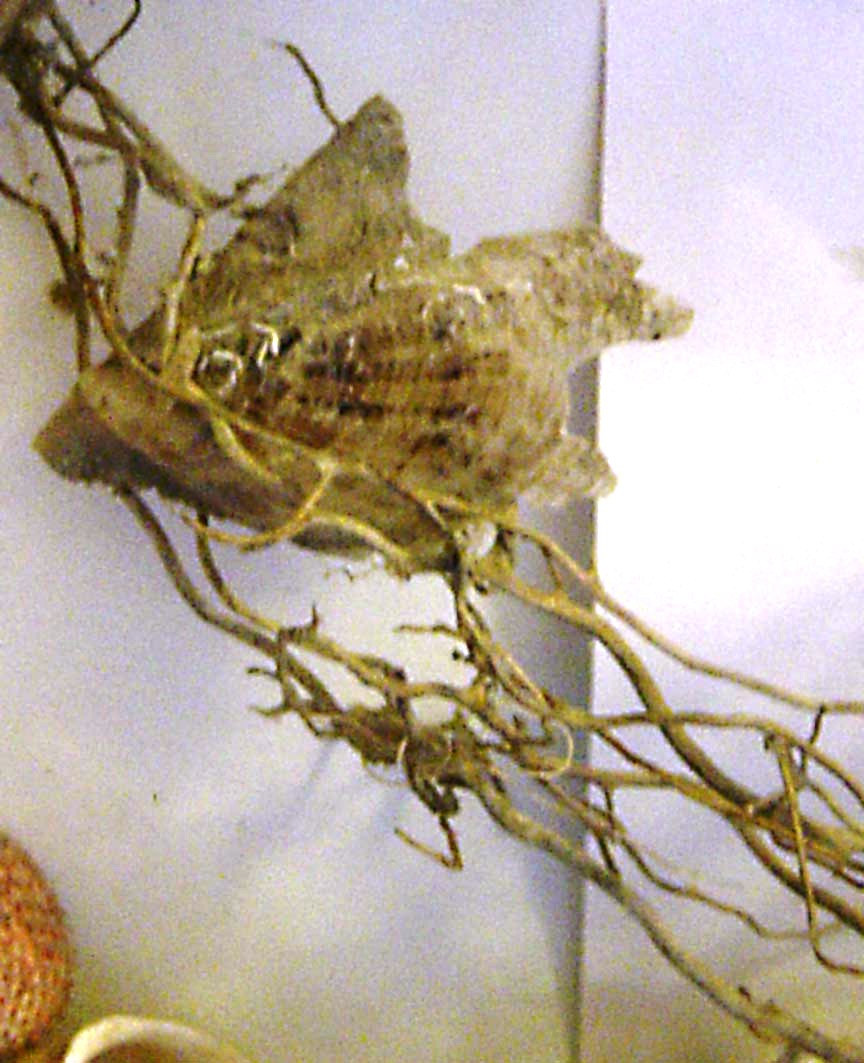
A live individual of Pteria hirundo

- Pteria hirundo (Linnaeus, 1758)

Semelidae

- Cumingia lamellosa (Sowerby, 1833)

Tellinidae

- Strigilla pseudocarnaria Boss, 1969

Teredinidae

- Lyodus pedicellatus (Quarterfages, 1849)
- Bankia carinata (Gray, 1827
- Bankia martensi Stempel 1899

Thraciidae

- Thracia distorta (Montagu, 1803)

Veneridae

- Cincomphalus strigillinus (Dall, 1902)
- Clausinella gayi (Hupé, 1854)
- Clausinella fasciata (Da Costa, 1778)

=== Estuarine bivalves ===
Corbiculidae

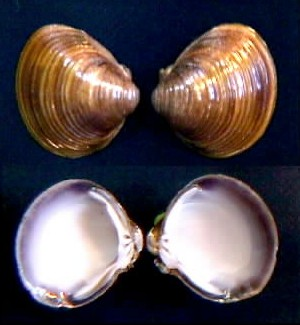
Two shells of Corbicula fluminalis

- Corbicula fluminalis (Múller, 1774)

Mytilidae

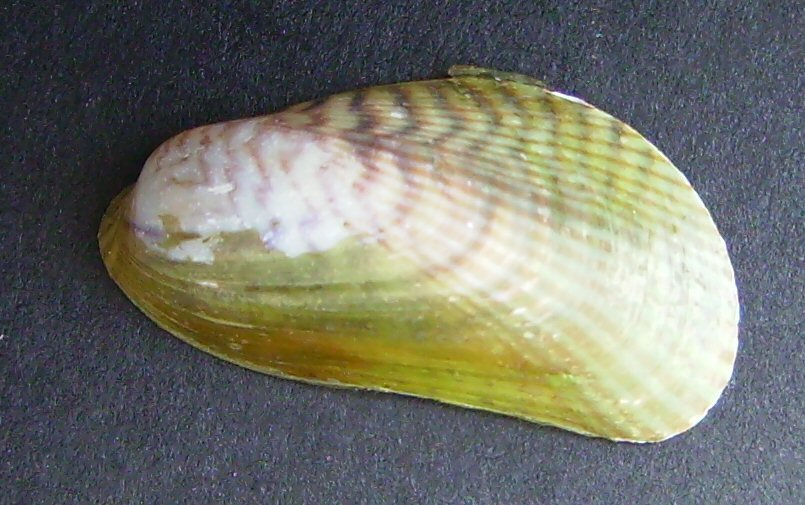
One valve of Musculista senhousia

- Musculista senhousia (Benson, 1842)

== See also ==
- List of echinoderms of Venezuela
- List of Poriferans of Venezuela
- List of marine molluscs of Venezuela
- List of molluscs of Falcón state, Venezuela
- List of non-marine molluscs of El Hatillo Municipality, Miranda, Venezuela
- List of non-marine molluscs of Venezuela
- List of birds of Venezuela
- List of mammals of Venezuela
