= Tandonia nigra =

Conservation status
- Least Concern (IUCN 3.1)

Scientific classification
- Kingdom: Animalia
- Phylum: Mollusca
- Class: Gastropoda
- Order: Stylommatophora
- Family: Milacidae
- Genus: Tandonia
- Species: T. nigra

Binomial name
- Tandonia nigra (K. L. Pfeiffer, 1894)

Synonyms
- Amalia nigra Pfeiffer, 1894

Species of gastropod

Tandonia nigra is a species of air-breathing land slug, a terrestrial pulmonate gastropod mollusk in the family Milacidae.

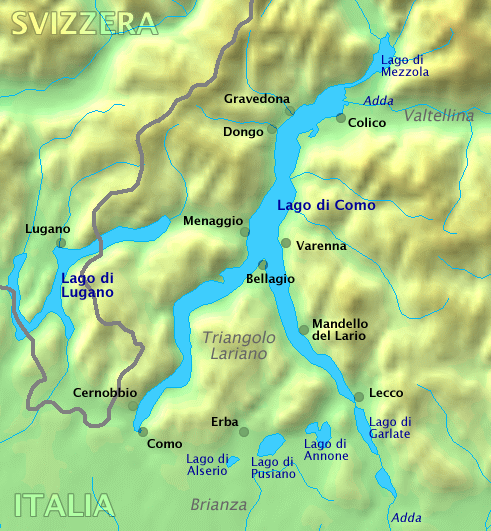
Map showing the area between Lake Como and Lugano lake, where Tandonia nigra occurs.

== Distribution ==
This slug species is endemic to north Italy and south Switzerland: Monte Generoso and Baraghetto peaks, east and west slopes, between Lake Como and Lugano lake.

The type locality is the peak of Monte Generoso, a mentioned altitude of 1695 m above sea level.

This species is known only from mountains peaks and east- and west- exposed slopes, at 1500–1700 m. It is an endemic species with a small range. The Swiss habitats are threatened by mass tourism; this species is Critically Endangered in Switzerland.

== Description ==
The slug is basically black, although the mantle is cream with very dense black spots. The tentacles are white with black dots, and when they are contracted they appear black. The neck and anterior sides are a dirty cream in color, as is the sole of the foot.

The body length of preserved specimens is up to 35 mm; the width of the body of preserved specimens is up to 7 mm.

Reproductive system: The penis is subdivided in two sections. The epiphallus is shorter and slightly widening at its posterior end. The vas deferens opens slightly asymmetrically. The oviduct is thin; the spermatheca is elongate with a short duct. The vagina is almost as long as the penis, with various accessory glands like short bundles surrounding the section between the oviduct and the vagina. The atrium is tubular, like a prolongation of the penis.

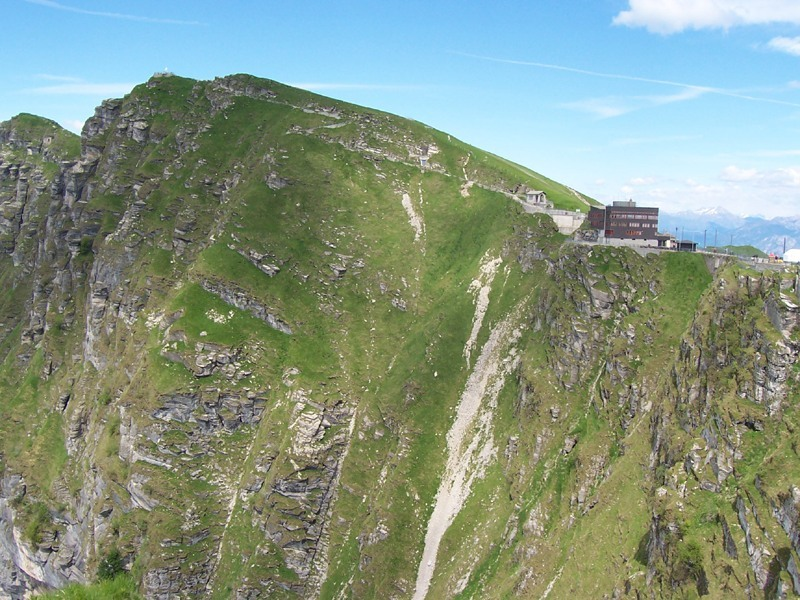
The peak of Monte Generoso is the type locality for Tandonia nigra

== Ecology ==
This slug seems to be active at night. It is presumably to be herbivorous.

Copulation occurs in July. Adults, semiadults and juveniles were observed simultaneously from May to October. The life cycle must take at least 2 years.
