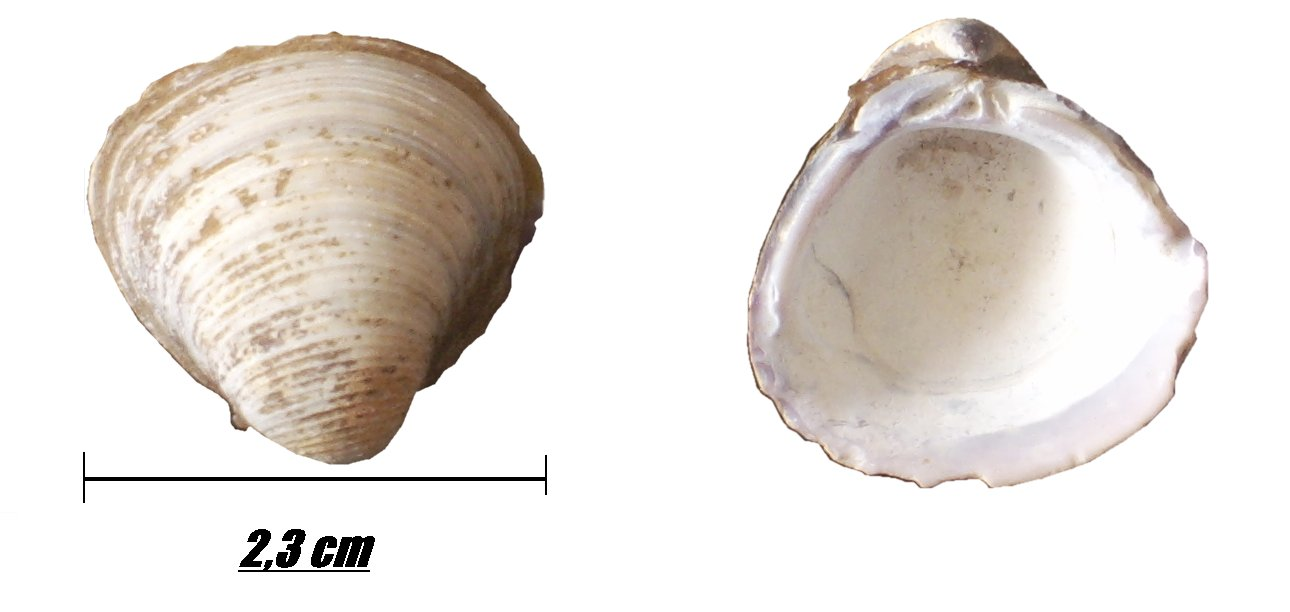
- Views of a shell of Corbicula fluminalis

Conservation status
- Least Concern (IUCN 3.1)

Scientific classification
- Kingdom: Animalia
- Phylum: Mollusca
- Class: Bivalvia
- Order: Venerida
- Superfamily: Cyrenoidea
- Family: Cyrenidae
- Genus: Corbicula
- Species: C. fluminalis

Binomial name
- Corbicula fluminalis (O. F. Müller, 1774)

= Corbicula fluminalis =

Species of bivalve

Corbicula fluminalis is a species of freshwater clam, an aquatic bivalve mollusk in the family Cyrenidae. This species is distinct from, but often confused with, the rather similar species Corbicula fluminea. Even though both species are native to Asia, they are both present as introduced species in the United States and Europe, and they are both commonly known as "Asian clams".

== Discriminating the two species ==
Two species are present in introduced populations, C. fluminea and C. fluminalis. However, the two species are often confused. The scientific names themselves are also sometimes confused in the literature (e.g. by being called "Corbicula fluminata"). Care needs to be taken in order to properly distinguish the two species.

The ratio of width and height in C. fluminea is on average 1.1. In C. fluminalis it is smaller (0.97); still, there is much variation and considerable overlap in shape.

Most easily, the two species can be distinguished by the density of the ribs on the shell; C. fluminea has 7 to 14 ribs per cm, C. fluminalis 13 to 28. This character is already clearly recognizable (albeit only by direct comparison) in very small (5 mm diameter) specimens.

In addition, when viewed from the side (looking at the opening between the shells), C. fluminalis is rounder, almost heart-shaped, while C. fluminea has a slightly flatter shape, like a teardrop with a notched broad end. Small specimens of C. fluminalis are almost spherical, while those of C. fluminea are decidedly flattened.

All these differences except the rib number are a consequence of C. fluminalis having a markedly more swollen, pointed and protruding umbo.

Corbicula ferghanensis (Kursalova & Starobogatov, 1971), endemic to Central Asia, is synonymized with C. fluminalis based on molecular data. The invasive lineage "form C/S" (COI haplotype FW17) is confirmed to represent C. fluminalis.

== See also ==
- List of introduced mollusc species of Venezuela
