= Subulina usambarica =

Conservation status
- Data Deficient (IUCN 2.3)

Scientific classification
- Kingdom: Animalia
- Phylum: Mollusca
- Class: Gastropoda
- Order: Stylommatophora
- Superfamily: Achatinoidea
- Family: Achatinidae
- Genus: Subulina
- Species: S. usambarica

Binomial name
- Subulina usambarica K. L. Pfeiffer

Species of gastropod

Subulina usambarica is a species of small, tropical, air-breathing land snail, a terrestrial pulmonate gastropod mollusk in the family Achatinidae.

== Distribution ==
The species is endemic to Tanzania.
