= Johannes Justus Rein =

German geographer (1835–1918)

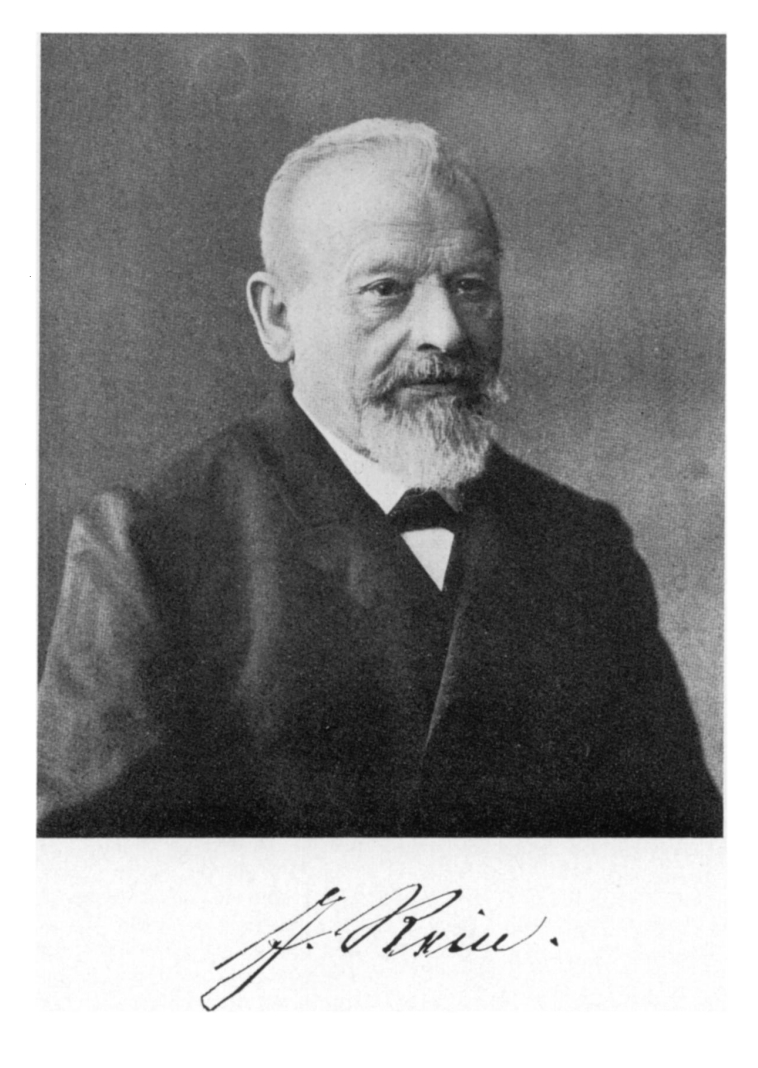
Johannes Justus Rein

Johannes Justus Rein (27 January 1835 in Raunheim, near Giessen – 23 January 1918 in Bonn) was a German geographer, author and traveler in East Asia. Rein became better known based on his two volume work on his travels in Japan which was translated into English in 1884.

== Biography ==
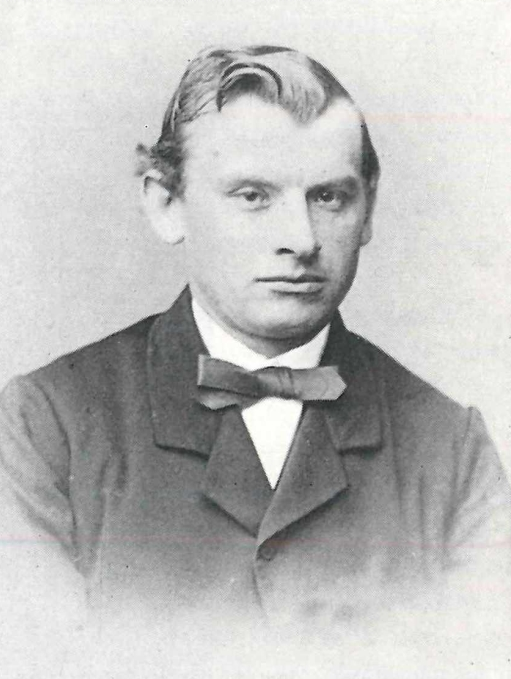
In youth

Rein was born in Raunheim. His father Kaspar gave up work as a customs officer and the family moved to a farm that he inherited in Mainzlar. After studies in the town elementary school and the Provincial Realschule in Giessen, he went in 1851 to study mathematics and science at the University of Giessen but gave up studies and he went to the teacher training college in Friedberg and in 1855 he became a high school teacher first at Frankfurt and then at Reval where he travelled around the Baltic region. He joined the University of Dorpat in 1961 and received a doctorate with a thesis on the vegetation and geography of Estonia. He then became a private tutor of the son of the governor of the Bermudas in Hamilton. During this stint he travelled in the United States and Canada taking an interest also in studies on corals. He returned to teach in Frankfurt, spending time researching in the Senckenberg natural research society. In 1868 he published a study on silk production and papers on the geography and vegetation of the Bermudas. He examined Darwin's theory on coral reefs at the German Geographers' Day in 1881 at Berlin. He went on trips to the Canary Islands and in 1872 to Morocco with Karl von Fritsch. and received a doctorate and married Maria Elisabetha Caroline von Rein (1837–1896). He made various scientific journeys in Europe, Asia, and America, and was appointed professor of geography at the University of Marburg in 1876, and subsequently at Bonn (1883) where he succeeded Ferdinand von Richthofen (1833–1905).

Rein spent the first five months of 1874 in Japan, residing in the German Legation in Tokio [Tokyo] and studying lacquer. After submitting a detailed report on the subject, he traveled throughout Japan. He collected specimens of plants, molluscs and other organisms during his travels. Along with Wilhem Kobelt, he published a book on the molluscs of Japan, Fauna molluscorum extramarinorum Japoniae.

== Writings ==
Rein wrote Japan, nach Reisen und Studien (2 volumes, 1881–86), which was translated into English, under the title, Japan: travels and researches undertaken at the cost of the Prussian government (1884), as was also his book The Industries of Japan. Together with an Account of its Agriculture, Forestry, Arts, and Commerce: from Travels and Researches Undertaken at the Cost of the Russian Government (1889). Another work was Columbus und seine vier Reisen nach Westen (“Columbus and his four trips to the West,” 1892). Rein revised his first book in 1905 working with his student Yamasaki Naomasa (1870–1929) who had also studied under Albrecht Penck (1858–1945) in Vienna. Naomasa later became a professor of geography at the Imperial Tokyo University.
