= Wilhelm Kobelt =

German zoologist

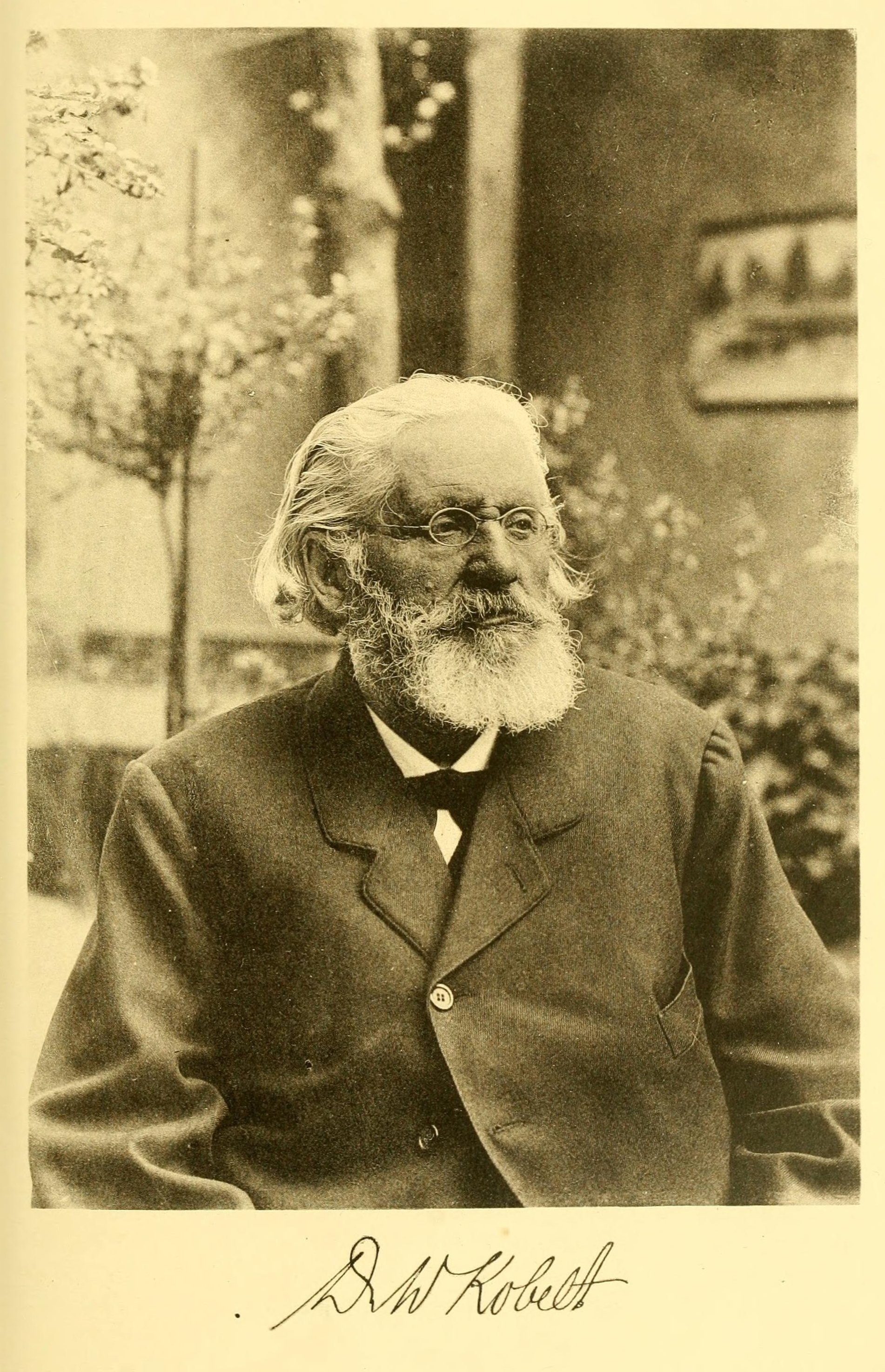
- Wilhelm Kobelt
- Born: 20 February 1840; Alsfeld
- Died: 26 March 1916 (aged 76)
- Scientific career
- Fields: malacology
- Institutions: Senckenberg Museum

Wilhelm Kobelt (20 February 1840 – 26 March 1916) was a German zoologist born in Alsfeld, Grand Duchy of Hesse. He specialized in the field of malacology and contributed to studies on the biogeography of freshwater molluscs.

Kobelt was born in Alsfeld, the eldest son of parish priest Wilhelm (1809–74) and Auguste (1815–97) née Kessler. He studied first at a school in Aslfeld run by his father and then went in 1855 to gymnasium in Gießen and studied medicine at the University of Gießen from 1857 and received a doctorate in 1862 with a dissertation on cardiac arrest. He practices as a physician in Biedenkopf (while his father worked nearby in Breidenbach) where he began a natural history society, and in 1869 he went to Schwanheim near Frankfurt am Main working there until 1880. He became interested in molluscs and interacted with Emil Adolf Rossmäßler in Leipzig although they never met in person. After the death of Roßmäßler in 1868, he carried out further work on the collections. He became a corresponding member of the Senckenberg nature research society and later became head of the mollusc section. He examined the collections of J. J. Rein made in Japan, Carlo von Erlanger from northern Africa, Willy Kükenthal from the Mollucas, Semper and Otto Franz von Moellendorff from the Philippines. He later worked as a curator of the Senckenberg Museum in Frankfurt am Main. He founded the German Malacological Society along with David F. Heynemann and also began a journal for malacology. From 1885 he published an Annual Report on Mollusc Systematics with support from the Zoological Station in Naples.

In 1871 Kobelt speculated that both small bivalves and operculate snails might be able to survive the guts of birds and be dispersed by them.

Kobelt bequeathed his personal collections to the Senckenberg Museum. Several species of mollusk contain his name, including Fusinus kobelti (Kobelt's spindle), Cymatium kobelti and Hyalinia kobelti. Kobeltia, a subgenus of Arion slugs, is named in honor of him.

== Selected publications ==
- Archiv für Molluskenkunde, 1868 - Archive of malacology.
- Jahrbücher der Deutschen Malakozoologischen Gesellschaft, 1874 - Yearbook of the German Malaco-zoology Society.
- Illustrirtes conchylienbuch, 1876 - Illustrated book of conchology.
- Reiseerinnerungen aus Algerien und Tunis, 1885 - Travel memoirs of Algeria and Tunis.
- Prodromus faunae molluscorum testaceorum maria europaea inhabitantium, 1886.
- Studien zur Zoogeographie, 1897 - Zoogeographical studies.
- Cyclophoridae, 1902 - Cyclophoridae.
- Die Verbreitung der Tierwelt : gemässigte Zone, 1902 - Distribution of wildlife; temperate zone.
- (in German) Kobelt W. (1909). "Die Gattung Paludina Lam. (Vivipara Montfort) (Neue Folge). In Abbildungen nach der Natur mit Beschreibungen". Systematisches Conchylien-Cabinet von Martini und Chemnitz, Nürnberg, 1(21a): pp. 97-430, plates 15–77.
