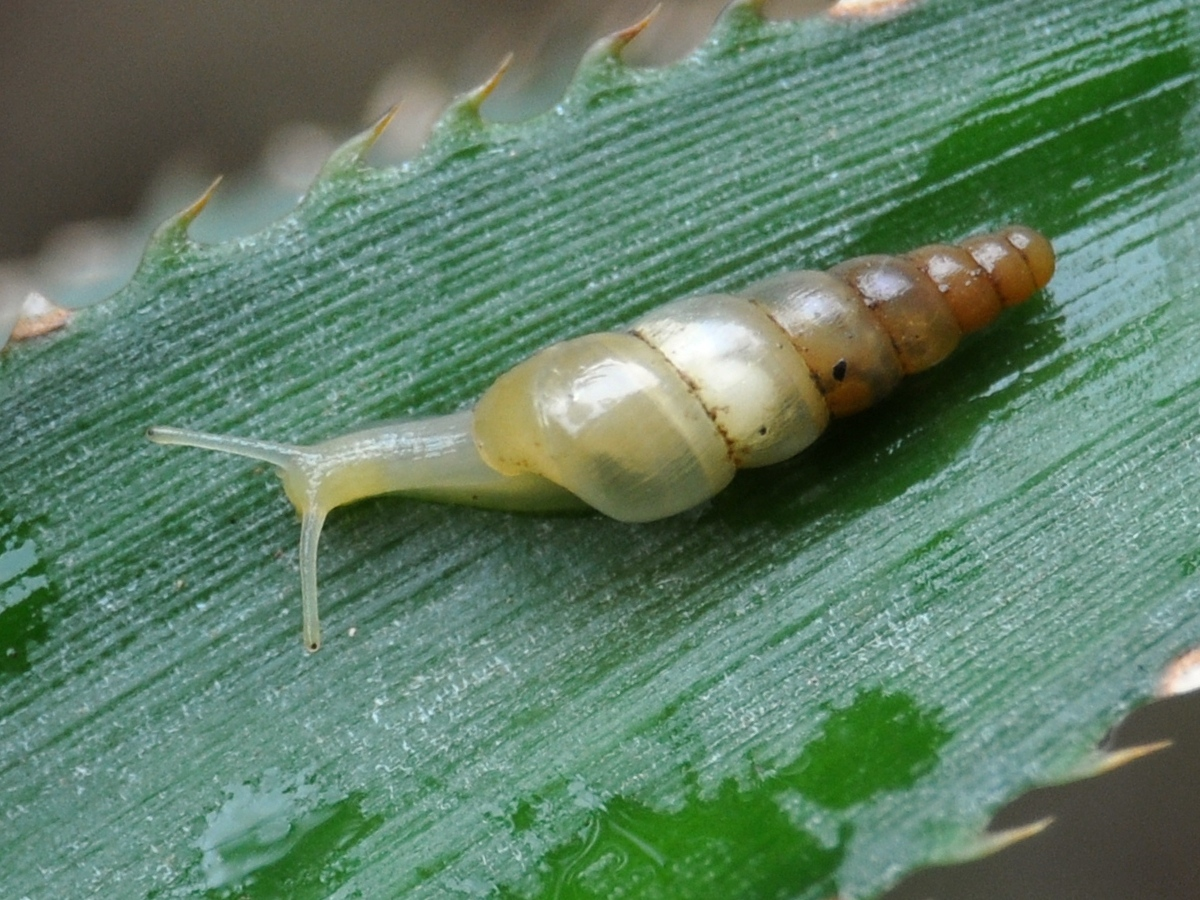
- A live individual of Subulina octona
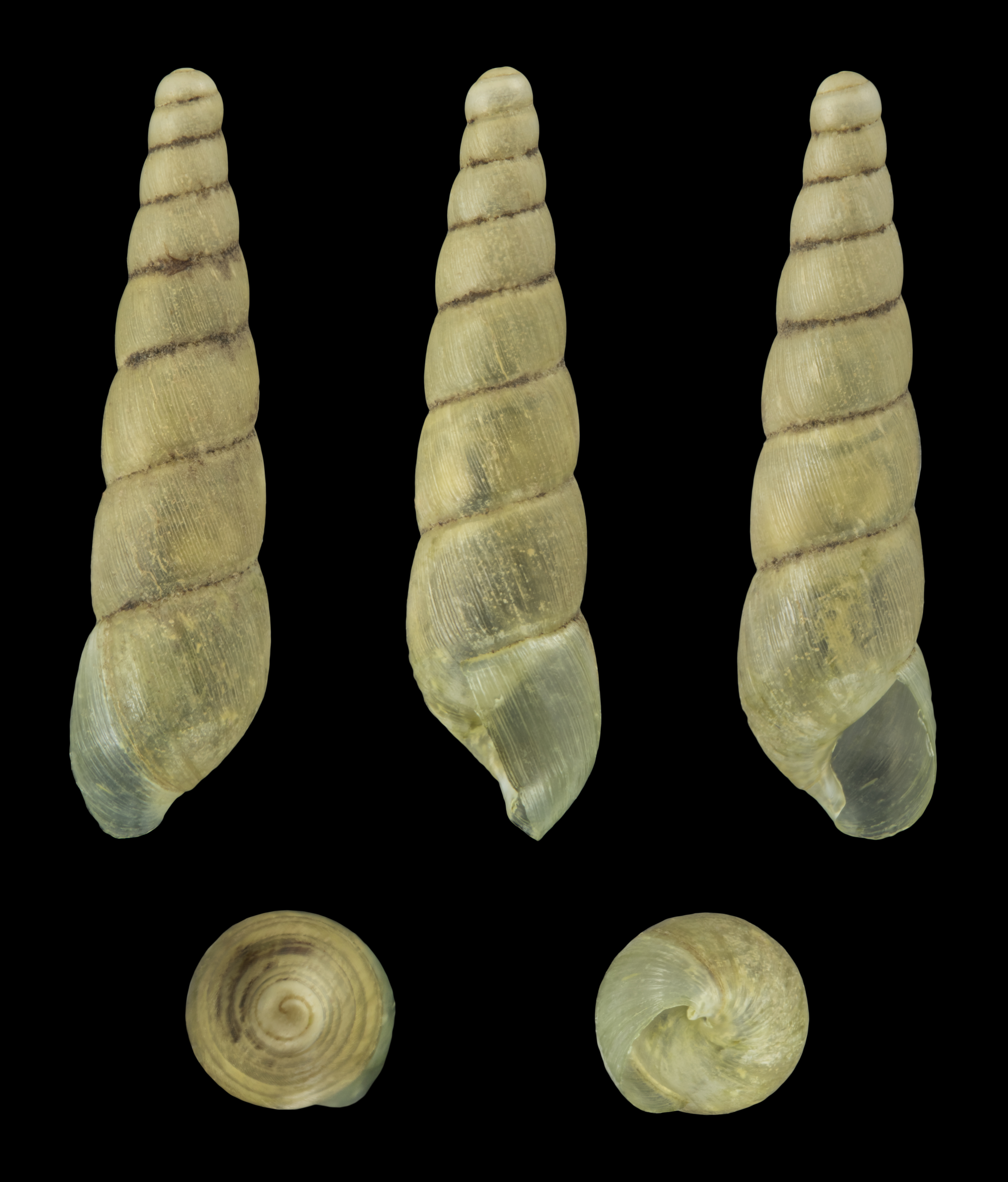

Conservation status
- Secure (NatureServe)

Scientific classification
- Kingdom: Animalia
- Phylum: Mollusca
- Class: Gastropoda
- Order: Stylommatophora
- Family: Achatinidae
- Genus: Subulina
- Species: S. octona

Binomial name
- Subulina octona (Bruguière, 1789)

= Subulina octona =

Species of gastropod

Subulina octona is a species of small, tropical, air-breathing land snail, a terrestrial pulmonate gastropod mollusk in the family Achatinidae.

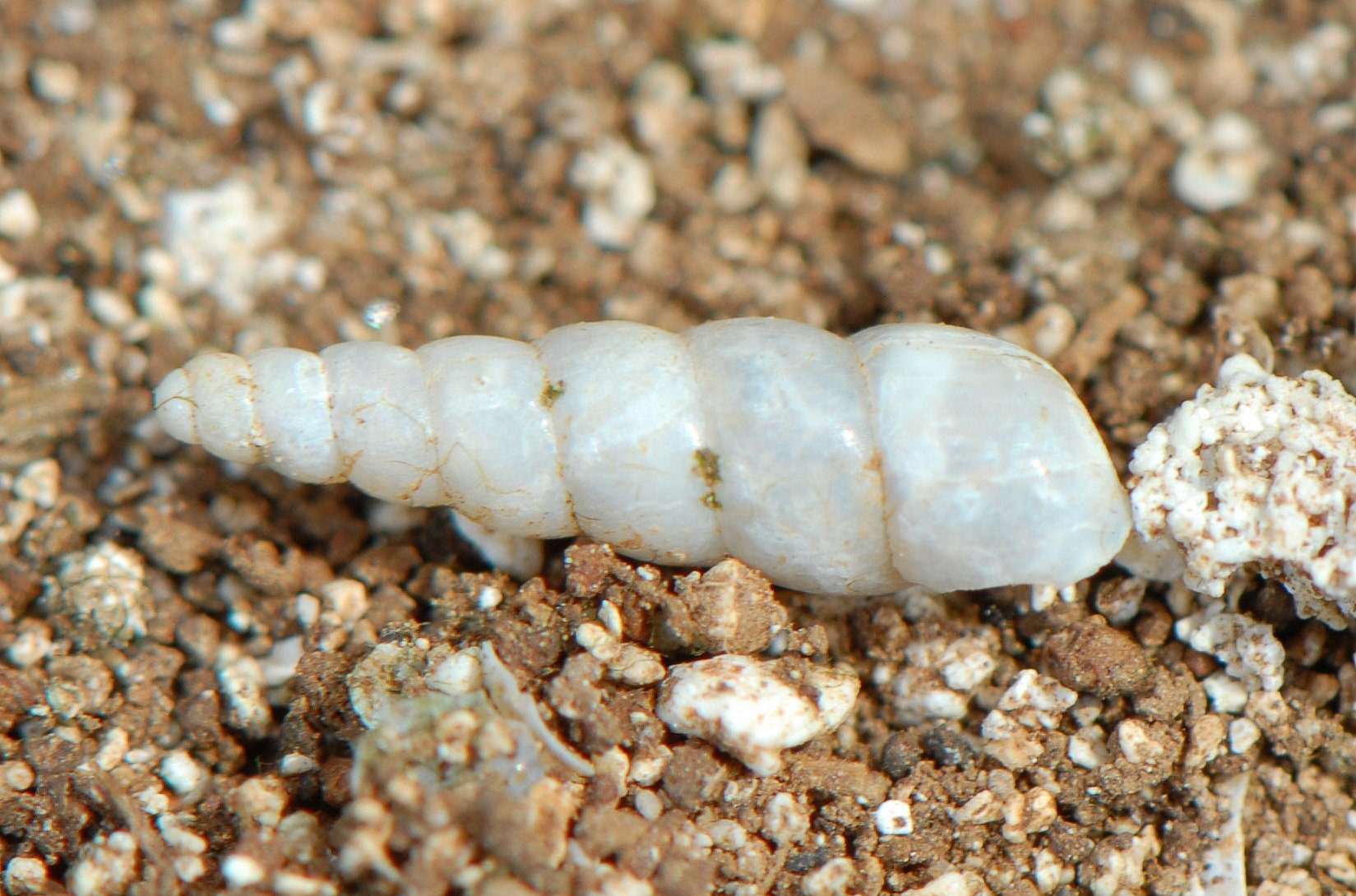
A shell of Subulina octona from Bermuda. The shell is transparent and colorless at first, but after death it rapidly becomes opaque.

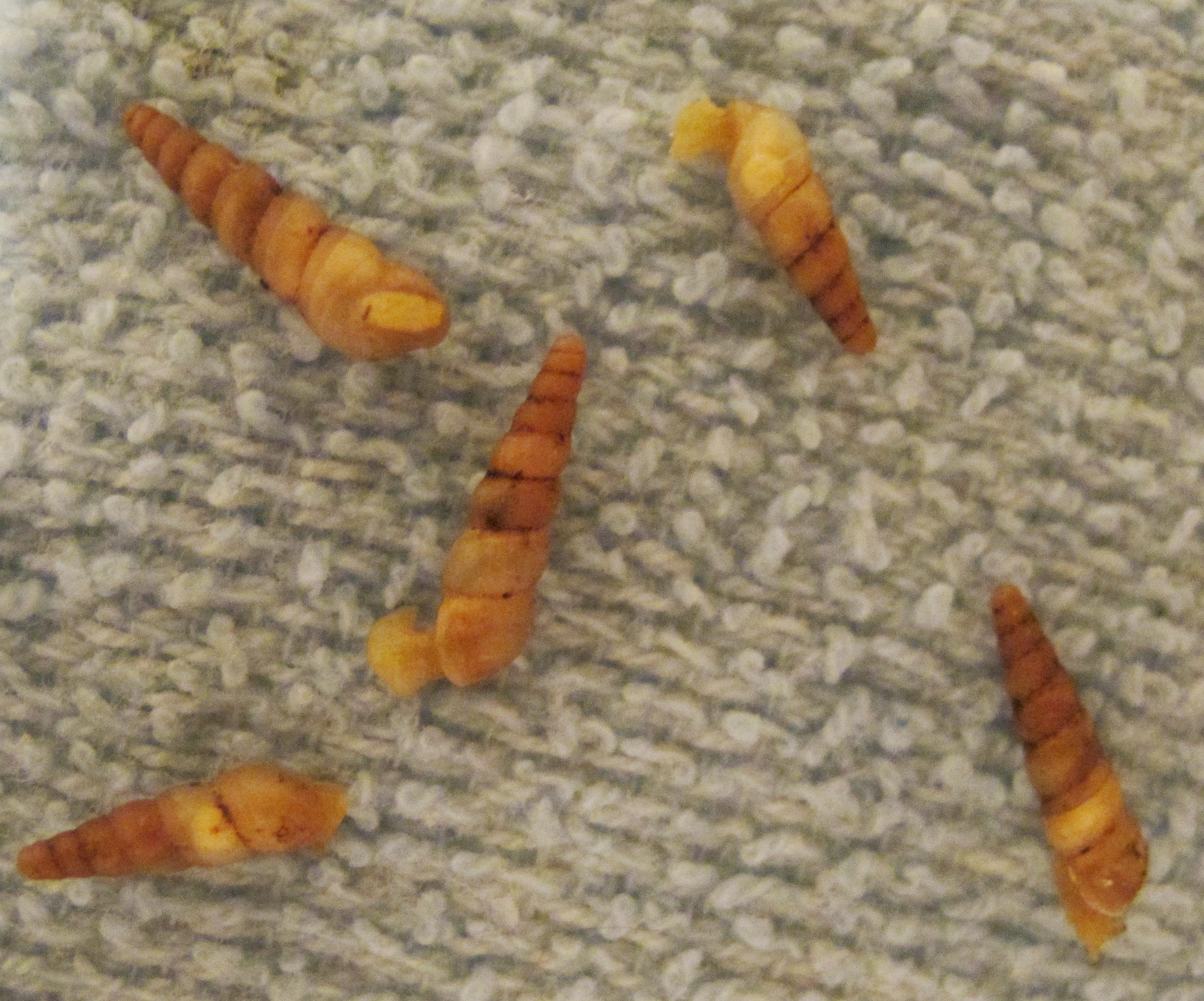
Five live individuals of Subulina octona on a wet washcloth. Nevis, West Indies. The yellow coloration is due to the soft parts showing through the transparent and colorless shell.

== Distribution ==
The native distribution of this species includes:

- Caribbean
- Cuba
- Venezuela

This species has been introduced to and become established in:

- Tanzania
- Dominica
- Czech Republic as a "hothouse alien"
- Great Britain as a "hothouse alien"
- Pratas Island, Taiwan
- and other areas

== Parasites ==
Subulina octona serves as an intermediate host for:

- Postharmostomum gallinum
- Angiostrongylus cantonensis
- Platynosomum illiciens (syn.: P. fastosum)

== See also ==
- List of introduced molluscs species of Venezuela
- List of molluscs of Falcón state, Venezuela
- List of non-marine molluscs of El Hatillo Municipality, Miranda, Venezuela
