= Barbarofusus barbarensis =

- Shell of Barbarofusus barbarensis (specimen at the Natural History Museum, Rotterdam)

Scientific classification
- Kingdom: Animalia
- Phylum: Mollusca
- Class: Gastropoda
- Subclass: Caenogastropoda
- Order: Neogastropoda
- Family: Fasciolariidae
- Genus: Barbarofusus
- Species: †B. barbarensis

Binomial name
- †Barbarofusus barbarensis (Trask, 1855)

Synonyms
- Fusinus barbarensis (Trask, 1855); Fusus barbarensis Trask, 1855

Extinct species of gastropod

Barbarofusus barbarensis, the Santa Barbara spindle, is an extinct species of sea snail, a marine gastropod mollusk in the family Fasciolariidae, the spindle snails, the tulip snails and their allies.

== Distribution ==
Fossils of this marine species were found in Southern California.
