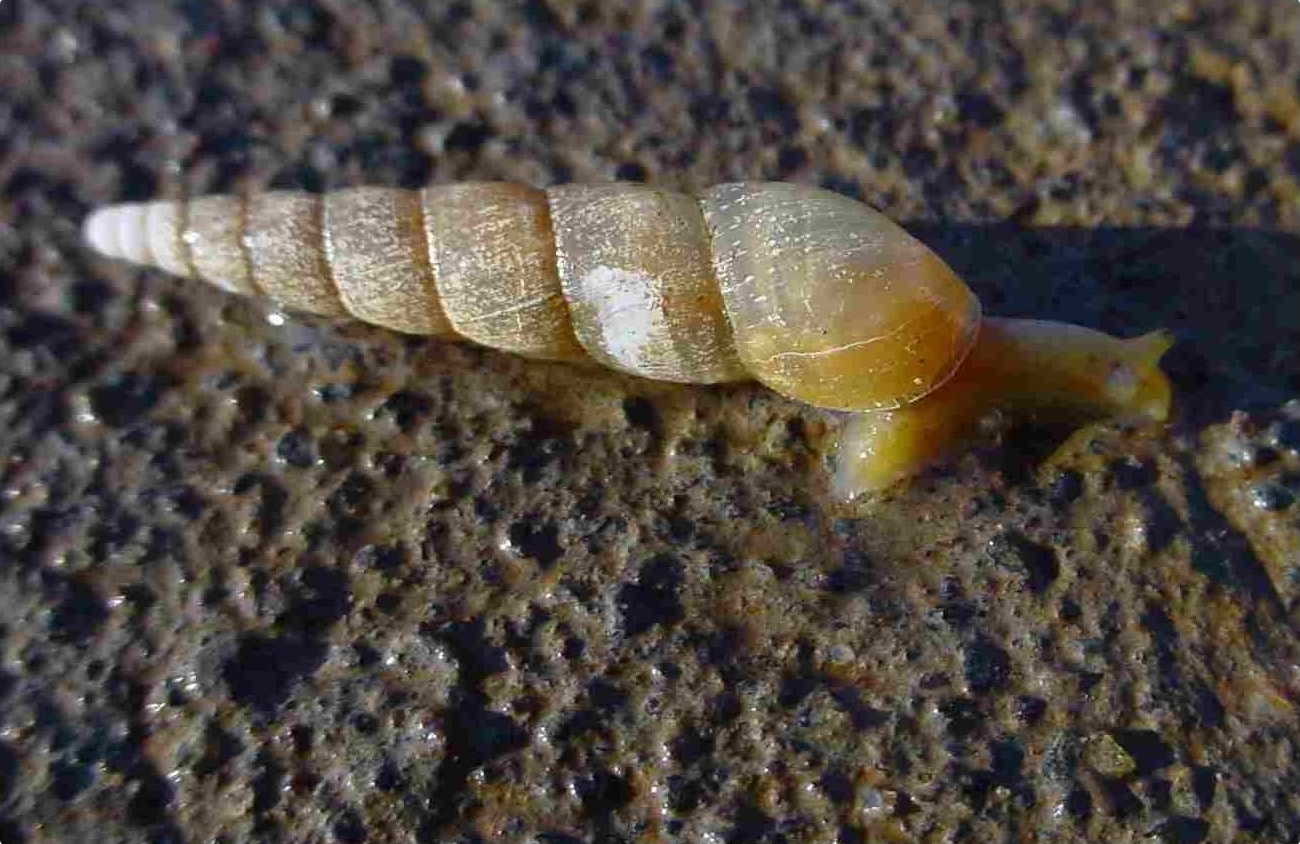

Scientific classification
- Domain: Eukaryota
- Kingdom: Animalia
- Phylum: Mollusca
- Class: Gastropoda
- Order: Stylommatophora
- Suborder: Achatinina
- Superfamily: Achatinoidea
- Family: Achatinidae
- Genus: Subulina
- Species: S. striatella

Binomial name
- Subulina striatella (Rang, 1831)

Synonyms
- Subulina grandis Madge, 1938: Subulina striatella (Rang, 1831) (superseded combination)

= Striosubulina striatella =

Species of gastropod

Striosubulina striatella is a species of small air-breathing land snail, a terrestrial pulmonate gastropod mollusk in the family Achatinidae.

== Distribution ==
This species is native to tropical West Africa. It is introduced in the Mascarene Islands: (Réunion, Mauritius, Rodrigues).

== Bibliography ==
- Rowson, B., Warren, B.H. & Ngereza, C.F. (2010). Terrestrial molluscs of Pemba Island, Zanzibar, Tanzania, and its status as an “oceanic” island. ZooKeys 70: 1–39.
