= Barbarofusus kobelti =

- Shell of Barbarofusus kobelti (holotype at the Smithsonian Institution)

Scientific classification
- Kingdom: Animalia
- Phylum: Mollusca
- Class: Gastropoda
- Subclass: Caenogastropoda
- Order: Neogastropoda
- Family: Fasciolariidae
- Genus: Barbarofusus
- Species: B. kobelti

Binomial name
- Barbarofusus kobelti (Dall, 1877)

Synonyms
- Fusinus kobelti (Dall, 1877); Fusus kobelti Dall, 1877

Species of gastropod

Barbarofusus kobelti is a species of sea snail, a marine gastropod mollusk in the family Fasciolariidae, the spindle snails, the tulip snails and their allies.

== Description ==
This species may reach 5.1 cm in length. A perfect specimen, but with the lip still unthickened, measures in total length: 1.85 in = 4.7 cm; the spire: 0.80 in = 2.0 cm; the aperture (to the posterior notch): 0.6 in = 1.5 cm; the siphonal canal: 0.5 in = 1.3 cm.

(Original description) The shell is elegantly and regularly fusiform, consisting of seven or eight whorls. It is sculptured with revolving lirae and transverse costae. In young specimens, the whorls are somewhat rounded, whereas in adults they are elongated.

In perfect specimens, the epidermis is dark ashy or greenish olivaceous. It rises into crowded lamellae and obscures the underlying coloration. However, its appearance varies with the age of the specimen and with its habitat. The apex is acute, and the second and third whorls are hardly larger than the embryonic whorl.

The shell is whitish, with alternating revolving ridges of dark brown. Occasionally, this brown colour extends across all the ridges. The ridges do not lose their colour as they pass over the costae, except where they have been worn away by rolling on the beach. Except on the earlier whorls, the ridges show no tendency to enlarge as they cross the costae.

On the posterior edge of the whorls, the shell is appressed to the suture, and the ridges there are inconspicuous in most specimens compared with those on the body of the whorl. Moreover, these ridges have the character of threads, since the interspaces are not channelled as they are in Fusus harfordi and F. luteopictus.

In the most perfect specimen, the body whorl bears twenty-two brown ridges, together with as many intercalary ridges of the same colour as the shell. In melanistic specimens, all the ridges may be tinged brown. On the antepenultimate whorl, between the sutures, there are about six main ridges and eight intercalary ridges.

The costae are rounded and prominent only on the earlier whorls. On the body whorl, they remain in a flattened condition but extend well over the periphery; unlike those of the preceding species, they do not become obsolescent.

The interior of the aperture is white. Before the lips become thickened, the brown lines show through, and the prominent white threads of the throat lie at some distance from the outer edge. At this stage, there is no siphonal fasciole. Later, both lips may become strongly thickened. The threads—ten or fifteen in number—then nearly reach the edge, and a labial callus and fasciole are formed. In adults, there are about twelve costae on the body whorl and ten on the sixth whorl.

== Distribution ==
This marine species occurs off Southern California.
