= Fusinus chocolatus =

Scientific classification
- Kingdom: Animalia
- Phylum: Mollusca
- Class: Gastropoda
- Subclass: Caenogastropoda
- Order: Neogastropoda
- Family: Fasciolariidae
- Genus: Fusinus
- Species: F. chocolatus

Binomial name
- Fusinus chocolatus (Okutani, 1983)

Synonyms
- Barbarofusus chocolatus Okutani, 1983

Species of gastropod

Fusinus chocolatus is a species of sea snail, a marine gastropod mollusk in the family Fasciolariidae which includes the spindle snails, the tulip snails and their allies.
