= Lake Elmo (disambiguation) =

Lake Elmo may refer to:

- Lake Elmo, Minnesota, a city in Minnesota
- Lake Elmo (Minnesota), a lake in Minnesota
- Lake Elmo State Park, a state park in Montana
