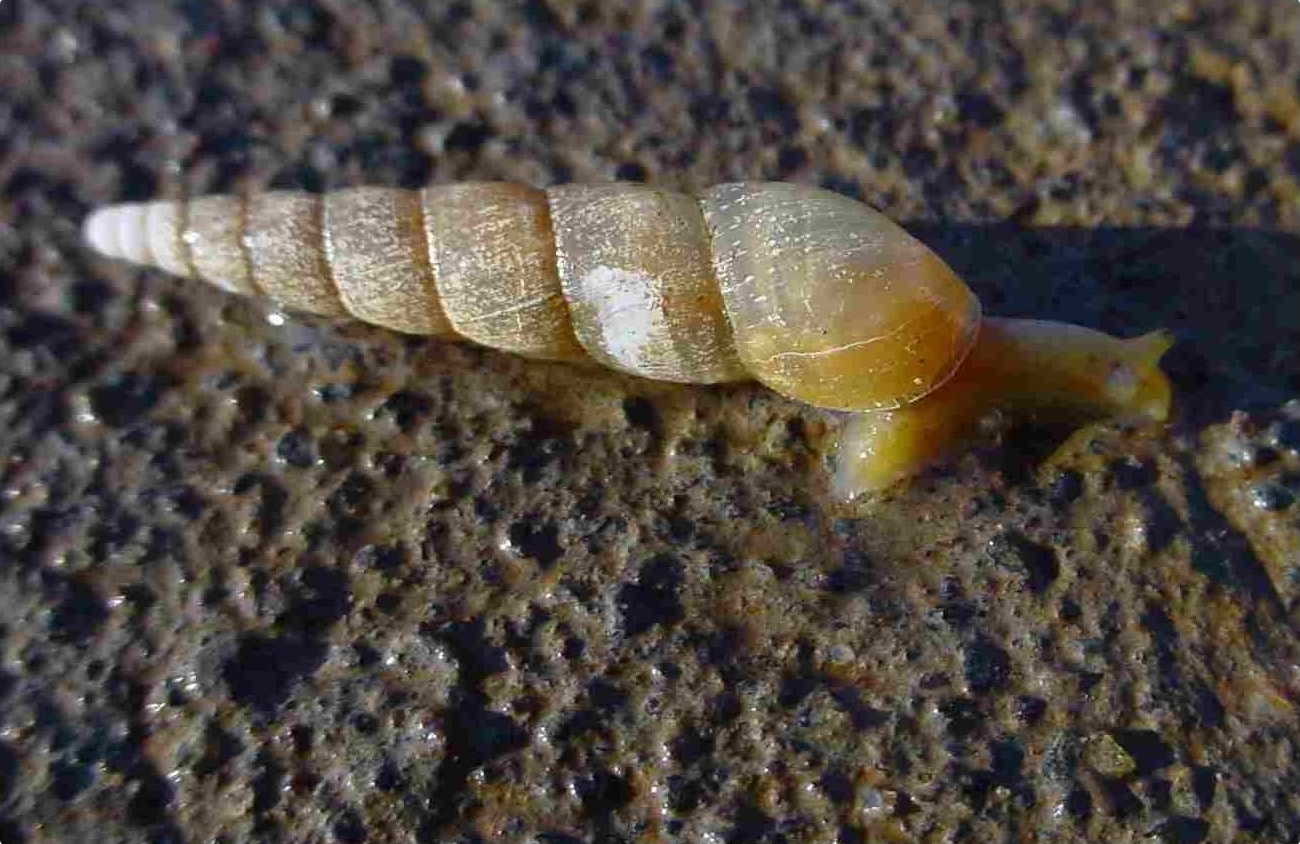
- A live individual of Subulina striatella

Scientific classification
- Kingdom: Animalia
- Phylum: Mollusca
- Class: Gastropoda
- Order: Stylommatophora
- Suborder: Achatinina
- Superfamily: Achatinoidea
- Family: Achatinidae
- Genus: Subulina; Beck, 1837

Type species
- Bulimus octonus Bruguière, 1789

Synonyms
- Achatina (Subulina) H. Beck, 1837 (original rank); Rumina (Subulina) H. Beck, 1837 (unaccepted rank); Stenogyra (Subulina) H. Beck, 1837

= Subulina =

Genus of molluscs

Subulina is a genus of small tropical air-breathing land snails, terrestrial pulmonate gastropod mollusks in the family Achatinidae.

Subulina is the type genus of the subfamily Subulininae.

== Species ==
The genus Subulina includes the following species:

- Subulina abessinica (Thiele, 1933)
- Subulina albini Germain, 1923
- Subulina avakubiensis Pilsbry, 1919
- Subulina bequaerti Pilsbry, 1919
- Subulina biafrae Ortiz de Zárate & Ortiz de Zárate, 1959
- Subulina bicolumellaris E. von Martens, 1895
- Subulina bruggenorum Breure & Ablett, 2018
- Subulina canonica (Mousson, 1886)
- Subulina cereola (Morelet, 1860)
- Subulina chiarinii Pollonera, 1887
- Subulina connollyi Bacci, 1951
- Subulina emini (E. A. Smith, 1890)
- Subulina entebbana (Pollonera, 1907)
- Subulina erlangeri O. Boettger, 1907
- Subulina feai Germain, 1912
- Subulina ferriezi (Morelet, 1882)
- Subulina glabella (Morelet, 1883)
- Subulina glyptochephala Pilsbry, 1919
- Subulina gracilenta (Morelet, 1867)
- Subulina gracillima Connolly, 1919
- Subulina gratacapi Pilsbry, 1919
- Subulina intermedia Taylor, 1877
- Subulina jaensis Preston, 1909
- Subulina kassaiana Rochebrune & Germain, 1904
- Subulina krebedjeensis Germain, 1907
- Subulina lacuum O. Boettger, 1907
- Subulina lasti (E. A. Smith, 1890)
- Subulina leia Putzeys, 1899
- Subulina lowei Pilsbry, 1919
- Subulina mabilliana Bourguignat, 1883
- Subulina mamillata (Craven, 1880)
- Subulina manampetsaensis Fischer-Piette & Testud, 1964
- Subulina maringoensis Preston, 1910
- Subulina moreleti Girard, 1893
- Subulina mrimensis Verdcourt, 1979
- Subulina munzingerii (Jickeli, 1873)
- Subulina newtoni Girard, 1893
- Subulina normalis (Morelet, 1885)
- Subulina octogona Bruguière, 1792
- Subulina octona (Bruguière, 1798) – miniature awlsnail
- Subulina ornata (Morelet, 1888)
- Subulina parana Pilsbry, 1906
- Subulina pengensis Pilsbry, 1919
- Subulina pergracilis E. von Martens, 1897
- Subulina perlucida (Preston, 1910)
- Subulina perstriata E. von Martens, 1895
- Subulina petrensis (Morelet, 1866)
- Subulina pileata (E. von Martens, 1876)
- Subulina pyramidalis (Morelet, 1883)
- Subulina roccatii Pollonera, 1906
- Subulina simplex (Morelet, 1882)
- Subulina sinistrorsa Dupuis, 1922
- Subulina suaveolata (Jickeli, 1873)
- Subulina subangulata Putzeys, 1899
- Subulina subcrenata E. von Martens, 1895
- Subulina taruensis Connolly, 1923
- Subulina terebella (Morelet, 1886)
- Subulina thysvillensis Pilsbry, 1919
- Subulina totistriata Pilsbry, 1906
- Subulina tribulationis Preston, 1911
- Subulina turtoni Connolly, 1923
- Subulina usambarica K. Pfeiffer
- Subulina viridula Connolly, 1923
- Subulina vitrea (Mousson, 1888)
- Subulina yatesi (L. Pfeiffer, 1855)

== Synonyms ==
- Subulina abdita Poey, 1858: synonym of Leptinaria striosa (C. B. Adams, 1849) (junior synonym)
- Subulina angustata (Jickeli, 1873): synonym of Homorus angustatus (Jickeli, 1873)
- Subulina angustior (Dohrn, 1866): synonym of Striosubulina striatella (Rang, 1831)
- Subulina antinorii (Morelet, 1872): synonym of Homorus antorinii (Morelet, 1872)
- Subulina arabica Connolly, 1941: synonym of Homorus arabicus (Connolly, 1941) (original combination)
- Subulina castanea E. von Martens, 1895: synonym of Oreohomorus castaneus (E. von Martens, 1895)
- Subulina chiradzuluensis E. A. Smith, 1899: synonym of Subuliniscus chiradzuluensis (E. A. Smith, 1899) (original combination)
- Subulina crystallina Melvill & Ponsonby, 1896: synonym of Opeas crystallinum (Melvill & Ponsonby, 1896) (original combination)
- Subulina cyanostoma Beck, 1837: synonym of Achatina cyanostoma L. Pfeiffer, 1842: synonym of Homorus cyanostomus (L. Pfeiffer, 1842) (nomen nudum)
- Subulina cylindracea Bourguignat, 1890: synonym of Subulona cylindracea (Bourguignat, 1890) (original combination)
- Subulina dohertyi E. A. Smith, 1903: synonym of Nothapalus dohertyi (E. A. Smith, 1903) (original combination)
- Subulina elegans E. von Martens, 1895: synonym of Ischnoglessula elegans (E. von Martens, 1895) (original combination)
- Subulina eulimoides Preston, 1909: synonym of Opeas eulimoides (Preston, 1909) (original combination)
- Subulina glaucocyanea Melvill & Ponsonby, 1896: synonym of Euonyma acus (Morelet, 1889)
- Subulina grandis Madge, 1938: synonym of Subulina striatella (Rang, 1831): synonym of Striosubulina striatella (Rang, 1831) (junior synonym)
- Subulina isseli Jickeli, 1874: synonym of Pseudopeas isseli (Jickeli, 1874) (original combination)
- Subulina jickelii Bourguignat, 1879: synonym of Homorus variabilis var. jickelii (Bourguignat, 1879): synonym of Homorus variabilis (Jickeli, 1873) (original combination)
- Subulina jouberti Bourguignat, 1890: synonym of Subulona jouberti (Bourguignat, 1890) (original combination)
- Subulina kempi Preston, 1912: synonym of Nothapalinus kempi (Preston, 1912) (original combination)
- Subulina laeocochlis Melvill & Ponsonby, 1896: synonym of Euonyma laeocochlis (Melvill & Ponsonby, 1896) (original combination)
- Subulina lagariensis E. A. Smith, 1904: synonym of Subulona lagariensis (E. A. Smith, 1904) (original combination)
- Subulina lenta E. A. Smith, 1880: synonym of Subulona lenta (E. A. Smith, 1880) (original combination)
- Subulina lhotellerii Bourguignat, 1879: synonym of Homorus variabilis var. lhotellerii (Bourguignat, 1879): synonym of Homorus variabilis (Jickeli, 1873) (original combination)
- Subulina maurtiana (L. Pfeiffer, 1853): synonym of Allopeas mauritianum (L. Pfeiffer, 1853): synonym of Allopeas clavulinum (Potiez & Michaud, 1838) (superseded combination)
- † Subulina nitidula Klika, 1891: synonym of † Pseudoleacina nitidula (Klika, 1891) (new combination)
- Subulina octana [sic]: synonym of Subulina octona (Bruguière, 1789) (unaccepted > misspelling)
- Subulina paucispira E. von Martens, 1892: synonym of Nothapalus paucispira (E. von Martens, 1892) (original combination)
- Subulina perrieriana Bourguignat, 1883: synonym of Homorus perrierianus (Bourguignat, 1883) (original combination)
- Subulina pietersburgensis Preston, 1909: synonym of Opeas lineare (F. Krauss, 1848)
- Subulina pinguis E. von Martens, 1895: synonym of Subulona pinguis (E. von Martens, 1895)
- Subulina plebeia (Morelet, 1885): synonym of Pseudopeas plebeium (Morelet, 1885) (superseded combination)
- Subulina porrecta E. von Martens, 1898: synonym of Mayaxis porrecta (E. von Martens, 1898) (original combination)
- Subulina purcelli Melvill & Ponsonby, 1901: synonym of Euonyma purcelli (Melvill & Ponsonby, 1901) (original combination)
- Subulina ruwenzoriensis Pollonera, 1907: synonym of Subuliniscus ruwenzoriensis (Pollonera, 1907) (original combination)
- Subulina sargi Crosse & P. Fischer, 1877: synonym of Pseudosubulina sargi (Crosse & P. Fischer, 1877) (original combination)
- Subulina servaini Mabille, 1887: synonym of Tortaxis servaini (Mabille, 1887) (original combination)
- Subulina solidiuscula E. A. Smith, 1880: synonym of Subulona solidiuscula (E. A. Smith, 1880) (original combination)
- Subulina splendens Thiele, 1910: synonym of Homorus splendens (Thiele, 1910) (original combination)
- Subulina striatella (Rang, 1831): synonym of Striosubulina striatella (Rang, 1831) (superseded combination)
- Subulina strigilis Melvill & Ponsonby, 1901: synonym of Opeas strigile (Melvill & Ponsonby, 1901) (original combination)
- Subulina suaveolans Jickeli, 1874: synonym of Homorus suaveolatus (Jickeli, 1873) (unjustified subsequent emendation)
- Subulina subulata (Jickeli, 1873): synonym of Homorus subulatus (Jickeli, 1873)
- Subulina trochlea (L. Pfeiffer, 1842): synonym of Subulina octona (Bruguière, 1789) (junior synonym)
- Subulina tugelensiis Melvill & Ponsonby, 1897: synonym of Euonyma tugelensis (Melvill & Ponsonby, 1897) (original combination)
- Subulina uncta E. A. Smith, 1903: synonym of Nothapalus unctus (E. A. Smith, 1903) (original combination)
- Subulina variabilis (Jickeli, 1873): synonym of Homorus variabilis (Jickeli, 1873)
- Subulina victoriae (Kobelt, 1913): synonym of Subulina entebbana (Pollonera, 1907) (junior synonym)
- Subulina virgo Preston, 1911: synonym of Cecilioides virgo (Preston, 1911) (original combination)
