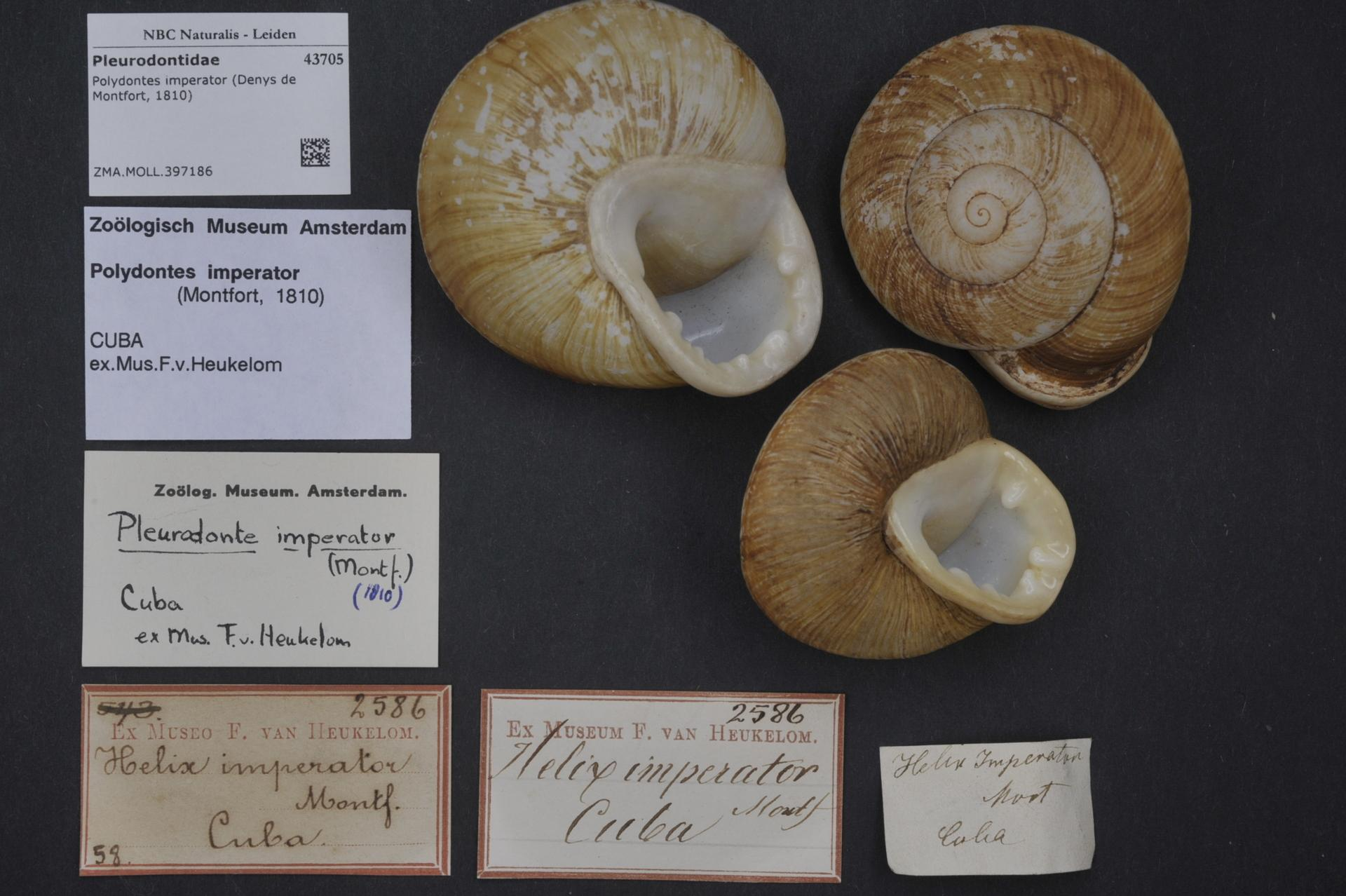
- shell of Polydontes imperator (specimen at Naturalis Biodiversity Center)

Scientific classification
- Kingdom: Animalia
- Phylum: Mollusca
- Class: Gastropoda
- Order: Stylommatophora
- Suborder: Helicina
- Superfamily: Sagdoidea
- Family: Sagdidae
- Genus: Polydontes; Montfort, 1810

Type species
- Polydontes imperator Montfort, 1810

Synonyms
- Agalma Albers, 1860; Galactochilus F. Sandberger, 1875; Helix (Galactochilus) F. Sandberger, 1875 (basionym); Polydontes (Galactochilus) F. Sandberger, 1875· accepted, alternate representation

= Polydontes =

Genus of gastropods

Polydontes is a genus of air-breathing land snails, terrestrial pulmonate gastropod molluscs in the subfamily Polydontinae of the family Sagdidae.

== Species ==
Species in the genus Polydontes include:

- Polydontes acutangula (Burrow, 1815) - in Puerto Rico
- Polydontes apollo (Pfeiffer, 1860) - in Cuba
- Polydontes castrensis (L. Pfeiffer, 1857)
- Polydontes imperator (Montfort, 1810) - in Cuba
- Polydontes luquillensis (Shuttleworth, 1854) - in Puerto Rico
- Polydontes natensoni Torre, 1938
- Polydontes perplexa (Ferussac, 1821) - in the Lesser Antilles
- Polydontes sobrina (Férussac, 1819)
- Polydontes torrei Pilsbry, 1938

Species brought into synonymy

- Polydontes gigantea (Scopoli, 1786): synonym of Hispaniolana gigantea (Scopoli, 1786)
- Polydontes lima (Ferussac, 1821) - in Puerto Rico: synonym of Granodomus lima (Férussac, 1821)
- Polydontes lychnuchus (Muller, 1774) - in Guadeloupe Martinique: synonym of Pleurodonte lychnuchus (O. F. Müller, 1774)
- Polydontes undulata (Ferussac, 1821) - extinct(?) in Haiti: synonym of Hispaniolana crispatus (Férussac, 1821) (based on invalid original name)
