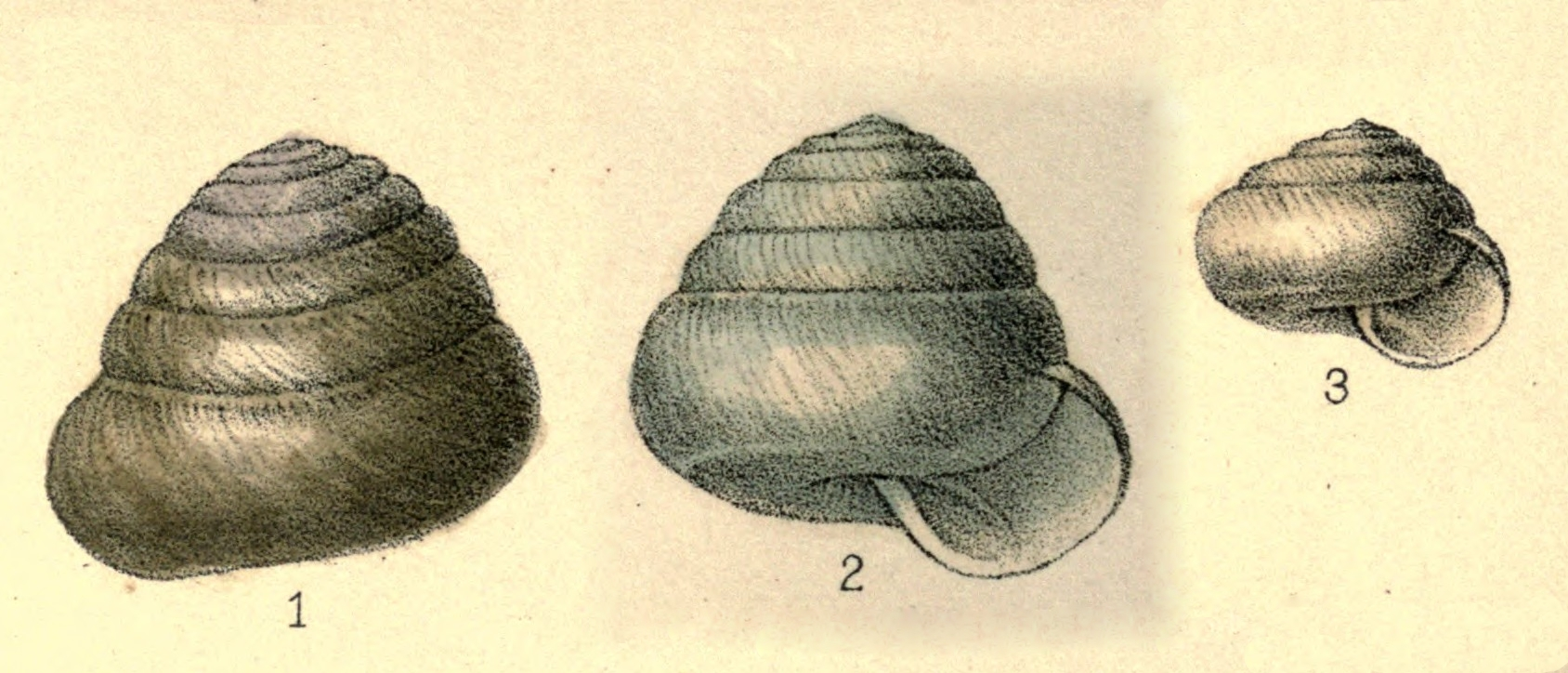
- Illustration of adult and juvenile shells of Sagda alligans

Scientific classification
- Kingdom: Animalia
- Phylum: Mollusca
- Class: Gastropoda
- Order: Stylommatophora
- Family: Sagdidae
- Genus: Sagda
- Species: S. alligans

Binomial name
- Sagda alligans (Reeve, 1851)

= Sagda alligans =

Species of gastropod

Sagda alligans is a species of air-breathing land snail, a terrestrial pulmonate gastropod mollusk in the family Sagdidae.

== Shell description ==
The shell is imperforate, globosely conoidal, white, under a brownish-yellow epidermis. The incremental striae are regular, stronger on the spire than on the body whorl. The number of whorls is 8. The shell has a narrow, aperture with a deep-seated strong basal lamella.

The adult shell diameter is 15–20 mm.

== Distribution ==
This species occurs in Jamaica.
