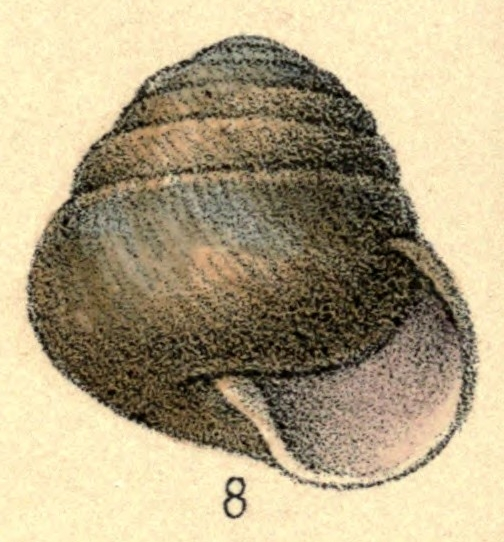
- Illustration of a shell of Sagda cookiana

Scientific classification
- Kingdom: Animalia
- Phylum: Mollusca
- Class: Gastropoda
- Order: Stylommatophora
- Family: Sagdidae
- Genus: Sagda
- Species: S. cookiana

Binomial name
- Sagda cookiana (Gmelin, 1790 or 1791)

Synonyms
- Sagda australis Epistylia conica

= Sagda cookiana =

Species of gastropod

Sagda cookiana is a species of air-breathing land snail, a terrestrial pulmonate gastropod mollusk in the family Sagdidae.

== Distribution ==
This species occurs in Jamaica.
