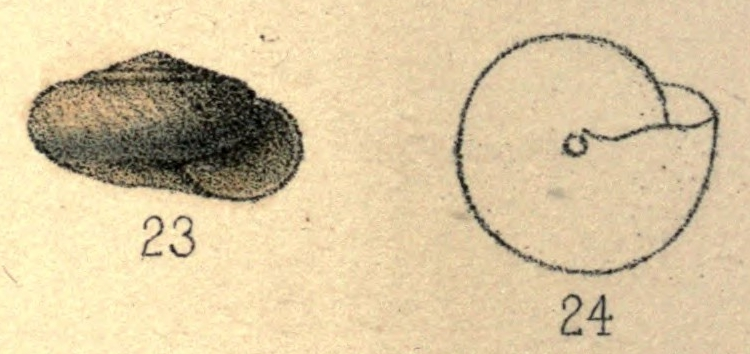
- shell of Hyalosagda similis

Scientific classification
- Kingdom: Animalia
- Phylum: Mollusca
- Class: Gastropoda
- Order: Stylommatophora
- Family: Sagdidae
- Genus: Hyalosagda
- Species: H. similis

Binomial name
- Hyalosagda similis (C. B Adams, 1849)

Synonyms
- Helix ambigua C. B Adams, 1849

= Hyalosagda similis =

Species of gastropod

Hyalosagda similis is a species of air-breathing land snail, a terrestrial pulmonate gastropod mollusk in the family Sagdidae.

== Distribution ==
This species occurs in Jamaica.
