= Aperture (mollusc) =

Main opening of the shell, where the head-foot part of the body of the animal emerges

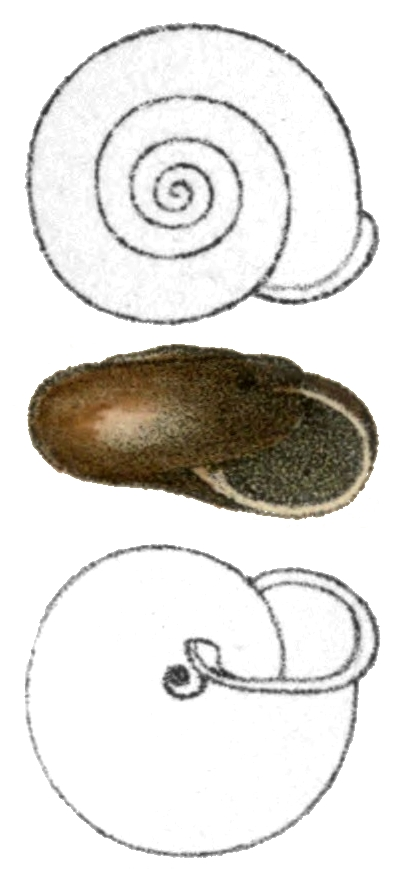
Three views of a shell of Norelona pyrenaica with the apertural view in the center

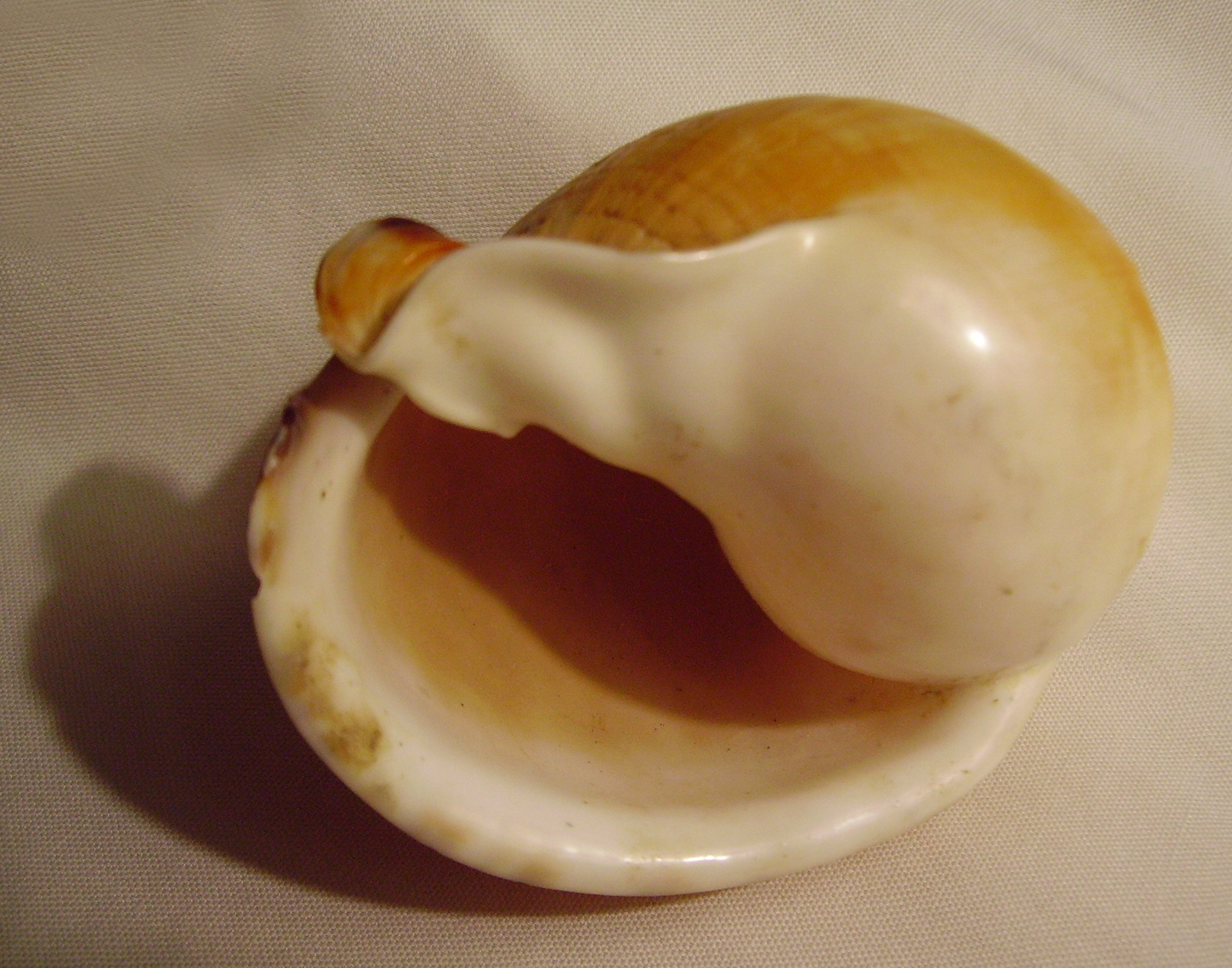
A shell of Semicassis pyrum, which has a large aperture and a pronounced parietal callus

The aperture is an opening in certain kinds of mollusc shells: it is the main opening of the shell, where the head-foot part of the body of the animal emerges for locomotion, feeding, etc.

The term aperture is used for the main opening in gastropod shells, scaphopod shells, and also for Nautilus and ammonite shells.

The word is not used to describe bivalve shells, where a natural opening between the two shell valves in the closed position is usually called a gape.

Scaphopod shells are tubular, and thus they have two openings: a main anterior aperture and a smaller posterior aperture.

As well as the aperture, some gastropod shells have additional openings in their shells for respiration; this is the case in some Fissurellidae (keyhole limpets) where the central smaller opening at the apex of the shell is called an orifice, and in the Haliotidae (abalone) where the row of respiratory openings in the shell are also called orifices.

== In gastropods ==
In some prosobranch gastropods, the aperture of the shell can be closed, and even completely sealed, with a sort of door or operculum.

The aperture of many snail shells is more or less round, rounded, elliptical or oval. This shape usually corresponds roughly to the cross-section of the body whorl of the shell.

The aperture of a snail shell can have many other forms: semicircular, trilobate or auriculate. In some gastropods, the aperture is narrowed by protruding plaits, which help make the soft parts of the animal less vulnerable to predation.

The growth of the shell is provided for by non-continuous addition of minute layers to the aperture margin (also called peristome) from the mantle border, the principal agent in the secretion of the shell.

== Terminology ==
The margin of the aperture is sometimes continuous or entire (Epitonium), or becomes continuous in the adult (Caracolus); very frequently it is interrupted, the left side of the aperture being formed only by the body whorl. When the aperture is called holostomatous, this means that the aperture is rounded or entire, uninterrupted by the siphonal canal, notch, or by any other extension

For convenience of reference, the margin of a gastropod aperture is divided into three areas:

- The parietal wall with the outer lip (labrum): the area next to the penultimate whorl of the shell. More precisely: the parietal wall is the area of the aperture where the margin lies against the surface of the body whorl. This area is typically covered by a parietal callus in species where the aperture is discontinuous (not forming a complete circle). Species with a continuous (holostomatous) aperture do not possess a distinct parietal wall. The siphonal notch is situated at the top.
- The columellar wall with the columellar lip (labium): the wall next to the columella. The siphonal canal is situated at its base.
- The palatal wall: the outer free wall of the final whorl of the shell.

The aperture is descending or deflected, when it does not follow the spiral of the shell, but turns downwards (such as in Helix). Sometimes it departs from contact with the preceding whorl (as frequently in Cylindrella.)

== Shape ==
The shape of the aperture in a gastropod shell can be:

- auriform, ear-shaped, as in Auriculella* bean - for example: Aerotrochus perdepressa
- circular, rotundate, orbicular
- claw-shaped aperture - Some Melongenidae have a claw-shaped aperture
- crescent-shaped - examples: Hyalosagda arboreoides, Dialeuca conspersula
- distorted aperture - Personidae has a distorted aperture
- linear, narrow. Cypraea, Conus
- longitudinal, when its greatest diameter is parallel with the axis of volution
- lunate, semilunar, semicircular or half-moon Nerita
- transverse, when its greatest diameter is at a right angle to the axis of volution
- oblique, when the greatest diameter is oblique to the axis of volution
- oblong, much longer than it is wide, rounded above and below
- oval or teardrop - examples: Geomelania minor, Urocoptis ambigua
- ovate, egg-shaped
- patulous, when dilated and then compressed, when diminished at its entrance
- quadrate, roughly square or rectangular, as in Architectonica
- rounded, the circle slightly interrupted; example: Valvata sincera. Consequently, there is no siphonal canal but simply an opening for respiration.
- semicircular
- with the top angle acute - examples: Leptopeas micrum, Varicella griffithii
- triangular, as in Janthina
- without an aperture
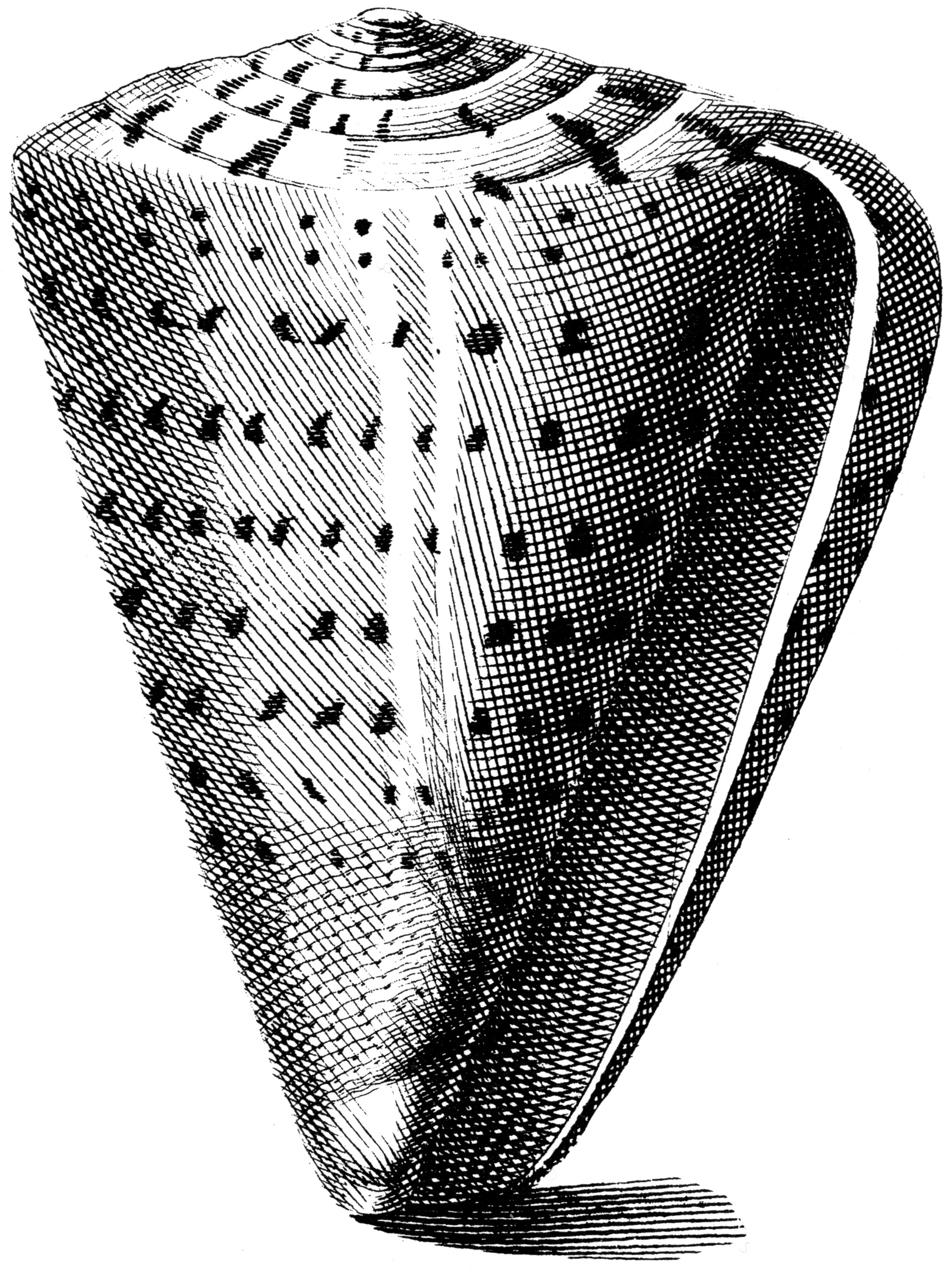
Conus betulinus has a long and narrow aperture.

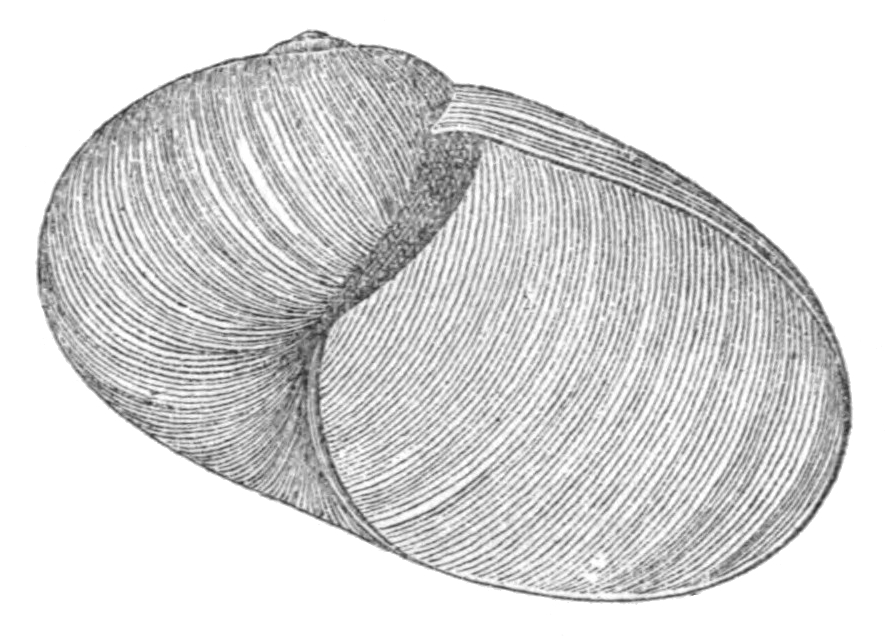
Indrella ampulla has an oval aperture.

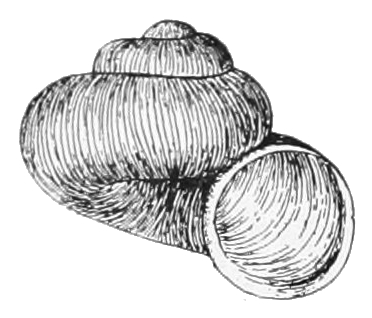
Valvata sincera has a rounded aperture.

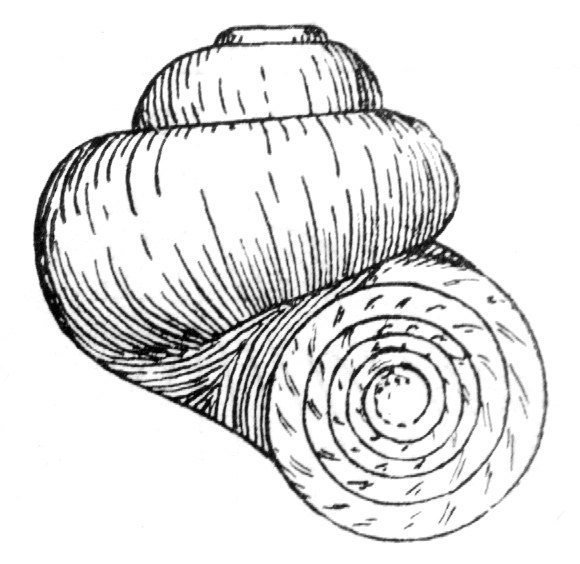
Rounded aperture of Valvata piscinalis can be covered by an operculum.

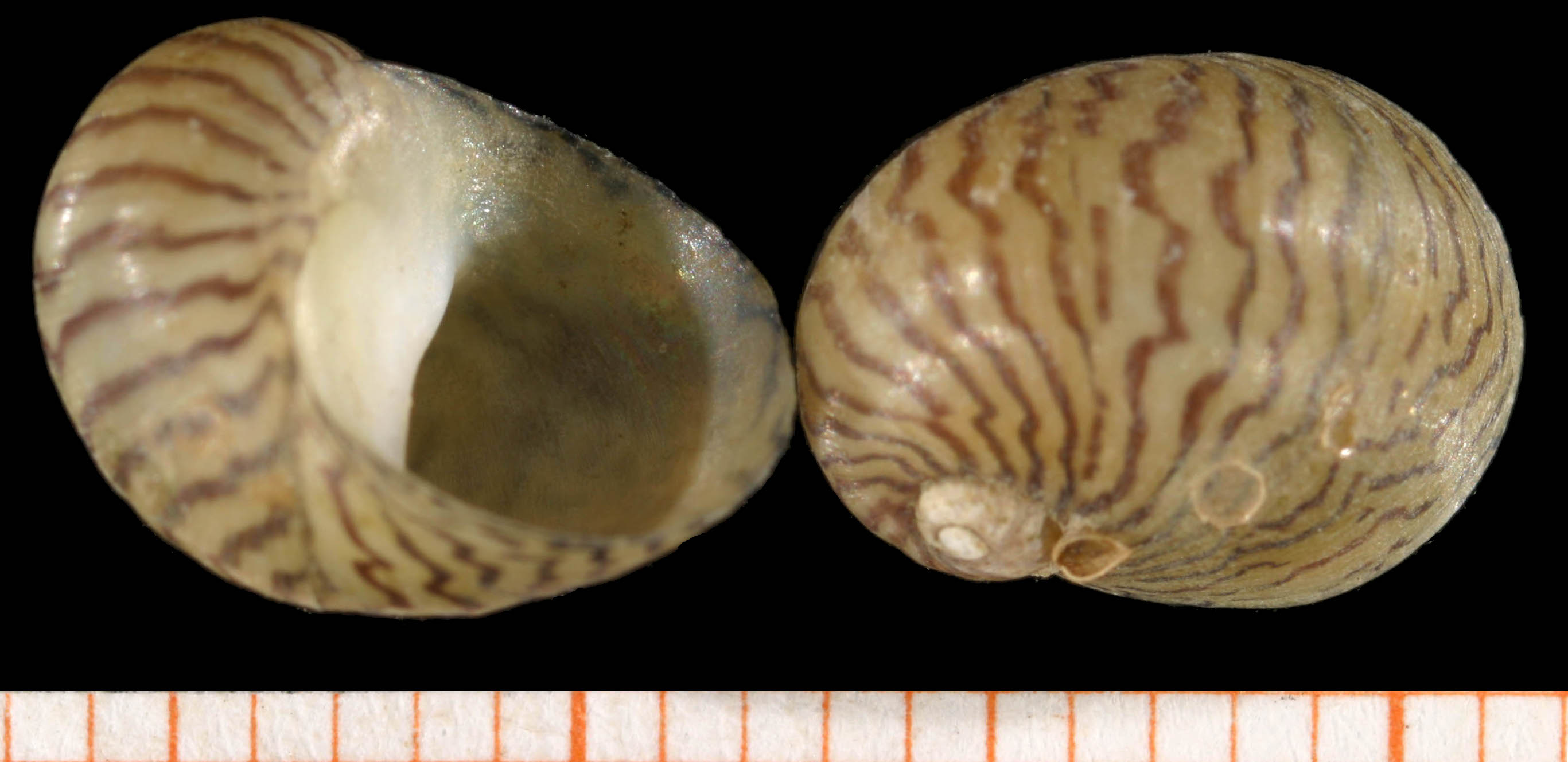
Theodoxus danubialis has a semicircular aperture.

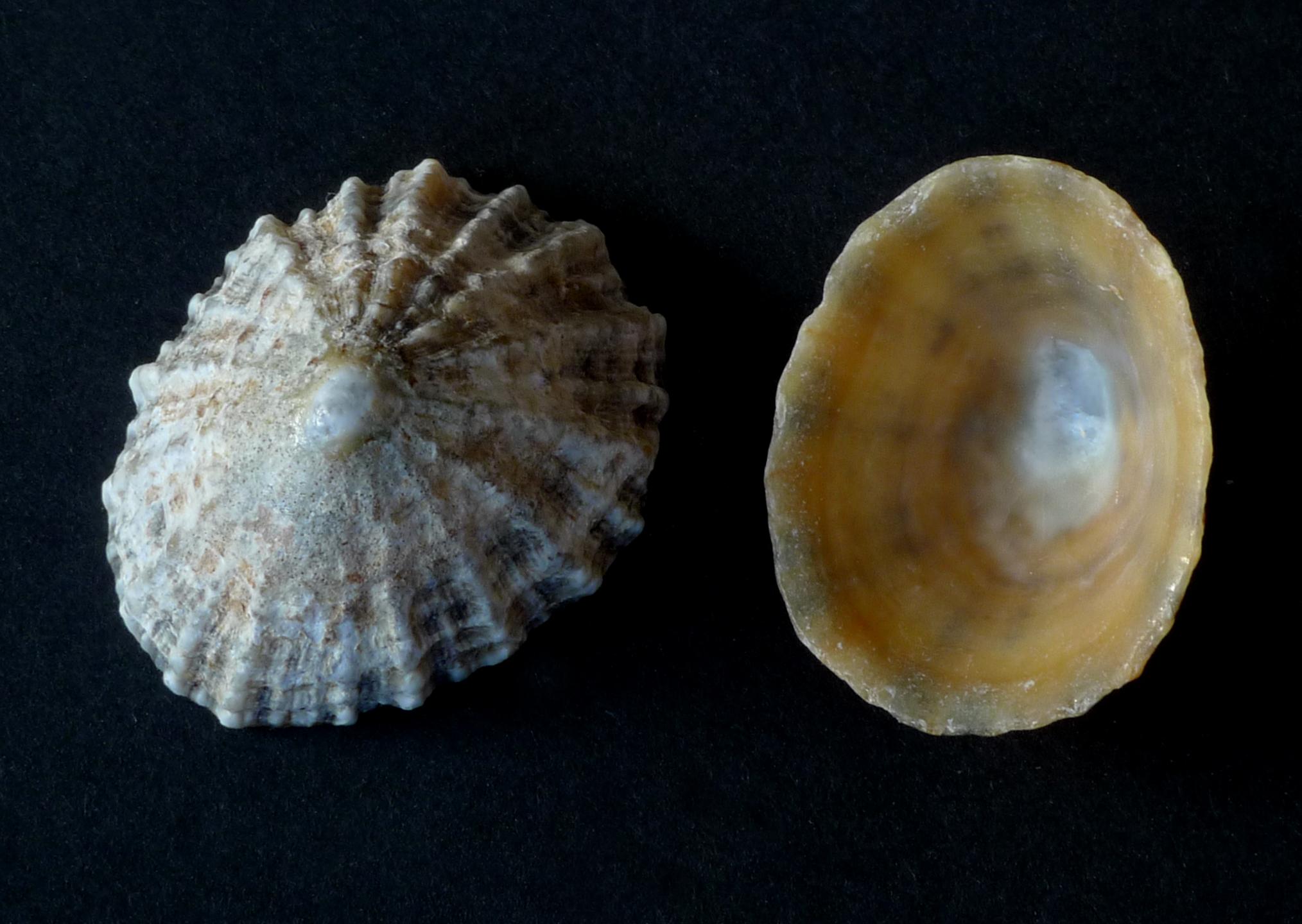
Some shells, like this Patella vulgata, have no aperture.

=== With teeth ===
The shells of juveniles in some species (especially some families of land snails) have a simple aperture with a sharp edge, but after reaching adult size the aperture of the shell finally acquires adult characters, consisting of a thickened, reflected, inflected or lipped edge, which is sometimes more or less contracted by inflected calcareous projections known as teeth. These teeth may be outer lip teeth, columellar teeth or parietal teeth.

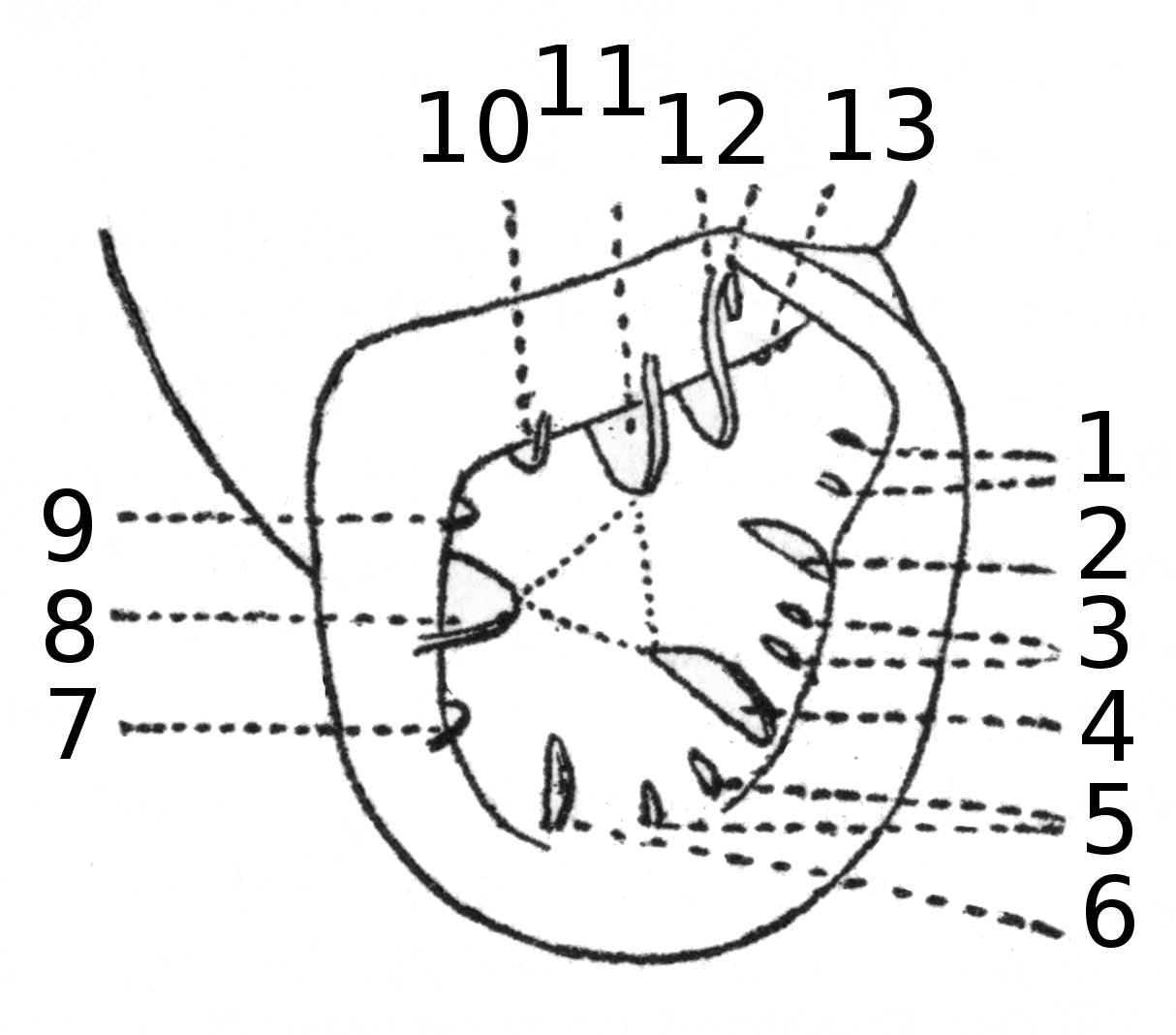
Scheme of an aperture of a gastropod showing terminology of teeth, plicae and folds

Folds or plicae are named by their position in the aperture, as follows. The numbers refer to those in the diagram shown opposite:

Folds or plicae

1. suprapalatal
2. upper palatal
3. interpalatal
4. lower palatal
5. infrapalatal
6. basal

Lamellae are named as follows:

7. infracolumellar
8. columellar
9. supracolumellar
10. infraparietal
11. parietal
12. angular and twin
13. paraller

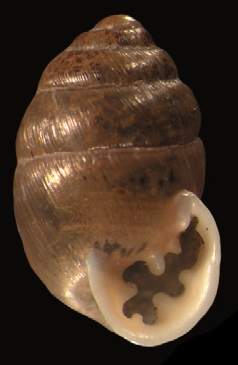
The dentate aperture of Multidentula ovularis

== See also ==
- Siphonal notch
- Siphonal canal
