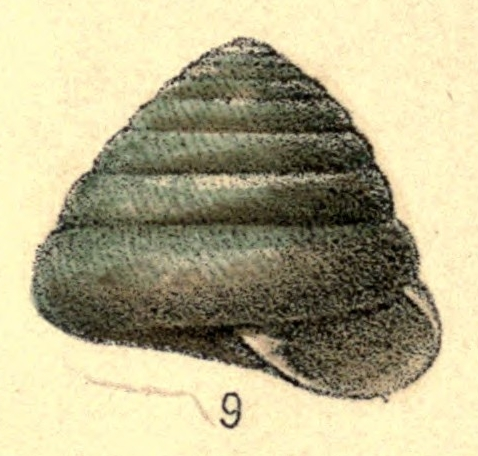
- Illustration of a shell of Sagda alveare

Scientific classification
- Kingdom: Animalia
- Phylum: Mollusca
- Class: Gastropoda
- Order: Stylommatophora
- Family: Sagdidae
- Genus: Sagda
- Species: S. alveare

Binomial name
- Sagda alveare (Pfeiffer, 1862)

= Sagda alveare =

Species of gastropod

Sagda alveare is a species of air-breathing land snail, a terrestrial pulmonate gastropod mollusk in the family Sagdidae.

== Distribution ==
This species occurs in Jamaica.
