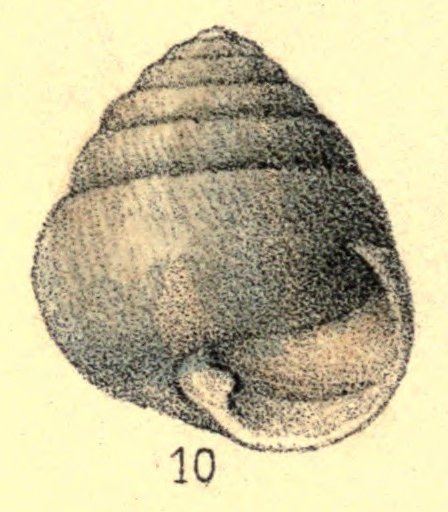
- Illustration of a shell of Sagda foremaniana

Scientific classification
- Kingdom: Animalia
- Phylum: Mollusca
- Class: Gastropoda
- Order: Stylommatophora
- Family: Sagdidae
- Genus: Sagda
- Species: S. foremaniana

Binomial name
- Sagda foremaniana (C. B. Adams, 1850)

= Sagda foremaniana =

Species of gastropod

2000 Franklin Templeton Tennis Classic

Sagda foremaniana is a species of air-breathing land snail, a terrestrial pulmonate gastropod mollusk in the family Sagdidae.

== Distribution ==
This species occurs in Jamaica.
