= Hyalosagda hollandi =

Scientific classification
- Kingdom: Animalia
- Phylum: Mollusca
- Class: Gastropoda
- Order: Stylommatophora
- Family: Sagdidae
- Genus: Hyalosagda
- Species: H. hollandi

Binomial name
- Hyalosagda hollandi (C. B Adams, 1849)

Species of gastropod

Hyalosagda hollandi is a species of air-breathing land snail, a terrestrial pulmonate gastropod mollusk in the family Sagdidae.

== Distribution ==
This species is found in Jamaica.
