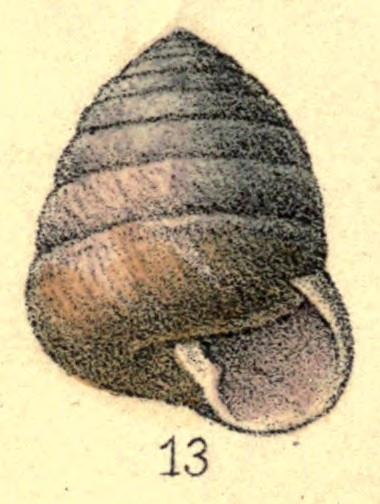
- Illustration of a shell of Sagda torrefacta

Scientific classification
- Kingdom: Animalia
- Phylum: Mollusca
- Class: Gastropoda
- Order: Stylommatophora
- Family: Sagdidae
- Genus: Sagda
- Species: S. torrefacta

Binomial name
- Sagda torrefacta (C. B. Adams, 1849)

= Sagda torrefacta =

Species of gastropod

Sagda torrefacta is a species of air-breathing land snail, a terrestrial pulmonate gastropod mollusk in the family Sagdidae.

== Distribution ==
This species occurs in Jamaica.
