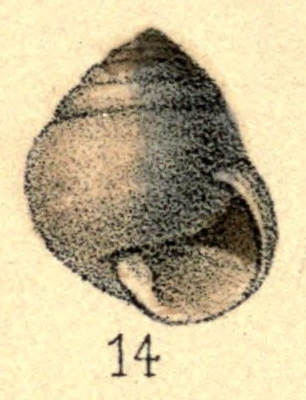
- Illustration of a shell of Sagda pila

Scientific classification
- Kingdom: Animalia
- Phylum: Mollusca
- Class: Gastropoda
- Order: Stylommatophora
- Family: Sagdidae
- Genus: Sagda
- Species: S. pila

Binomial name
- Sagda pila (C. B. Adams)

= Sagda pila =

Species of gastropod

Sagda pila is a species of air-breathing land snail, a terrestrial pulmonate gastropod mollusk in the family Sagdidae.

== Distribution ==
This species occurs in Jamaica.
