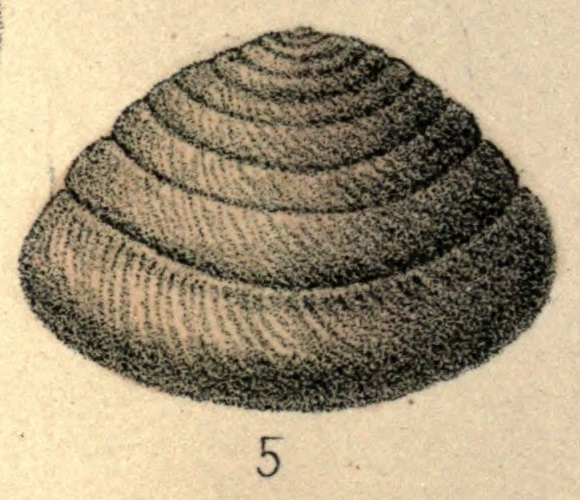
- Illustration of a shell of Sagda connectens

Scientific classification
- Kingdom: Animalia
- Phylum: Mollusca
- Class: Gastropoda
- Order: Stylommatophora
- Family: Sagdidae
- Genus: Sagda
- Species: S. connectens

Binomial name
- Sagda connectens (C. B. Adams, 1848)

= Sagda connectens =

Species of gastropod

Sagda connectens is a species of air-breathing land snail, a terrestrial pulmonate gastropod mollusk in the family Sagdidae.

== Distribution ==
This species is found in Jamaica.
