= Polydontes acutangula =

Scientific classification
- Kingdom: Animalia
- Phylum: Mollusca
- Class: Gastropoda
- Order: Stylommatophora
- Family: Sagdidae
- Genus: Polydontes
- Species: P. acutangula

Binomial name
- Polydontes acutangula (Burrow, 1815)

Species of gastropod

Polydontes acutangula is a species of air-breathing land snail, a terrestrial pulmonate gastropod mollusc in the family Sagdidae.

== Distribution ==
This species occurs in Puerto Rico.

== Life cycle ==
The size of the animal is about 45 mm. The size of the egg is 9.6 × 7.6 mm.
