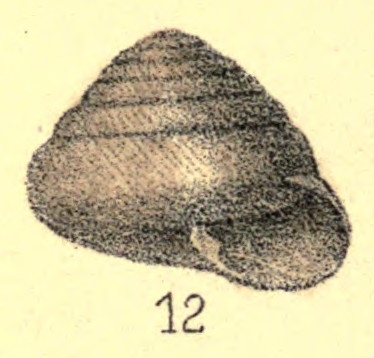
- Illustration of a shell of Sagda spiculosa

Scientific classification
- Kingdom: Animalia
- Phylum: Mollusca
- Class: Gastropoda
- Order: Stylommatophora
- Family: Sagdidae
- Genus: Sagda
- Species: S. spiculosa

Binomial name
- Sagda spiculosa (Pfeiffer, 1859)

= Sagda spiculosa =

Species of gastropod

Sagda spiculosa is a species of air-breathing land snail, a terrestrial pulmonate gastropod mollusk in the family Sagdidae.

== Distribution ==
This species occurs in Jamaica.
