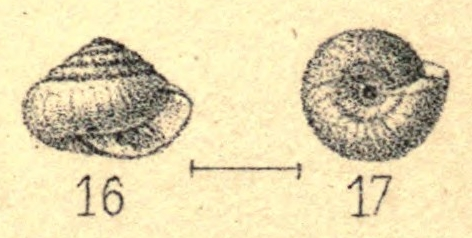
- Two views of a shell of Odontosagda blandii

Scientific classification
- Kingdom: Animalia
- Phylum: Mollusca
- Class: Gastropoda
- Order: Stylommatophora
- Family: Sagdidae
- Subfamily: Sagdinae
- Genus: Odontosagda; Martens 1860

= Odontosagda =

Genus of gastropods

Odontosagda is a genus of air-breathing land snails, terrestrial pulmonate gastropod mollusks in the family Sagdidae.

== Species ==
Species within the genus Odontosagda include:

- Odontosagda blandii
- Odontosagda superbum
- Odontosagda suprema
