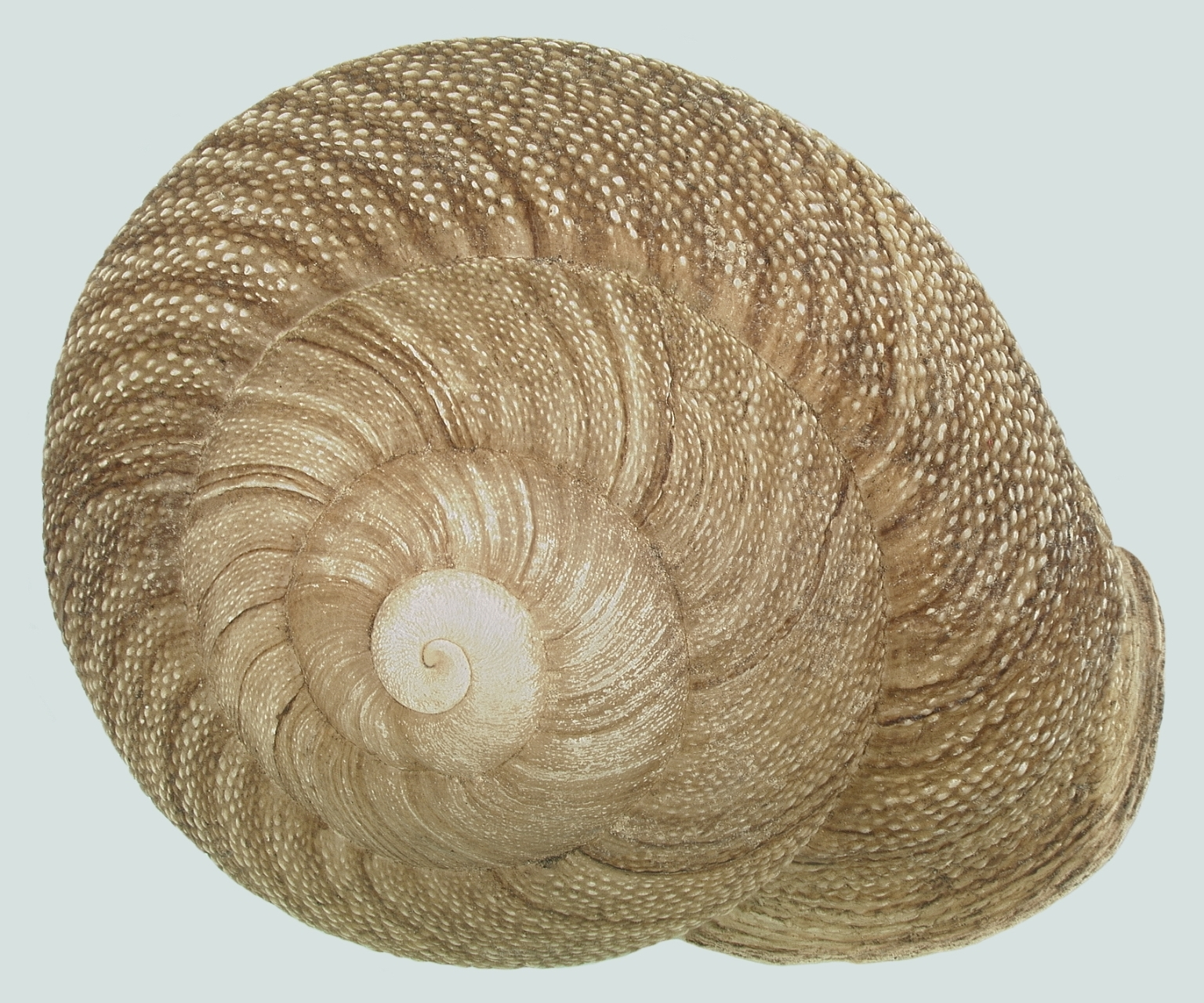
- Apical view of a shell of Granodomus lima

Scientific classification
- Domain: Eukaryota
- Kingdom: Animalia
- Phylum: Mollusca
- Class: Gastropoda
- Order: Stylommatophora
- Suborder: Helicina
- Superfamily: Sagdoidea
- Family: Sagdidae
- Genus: Granodomus; Wurtz, 1955

Type species
- Helix lima Férussac, 1821

= Granodomus =

Genus of gastropods

Granodomus is a genus of air-breathing land snails, terrestrial pulmonate gastropod molluscs in the subfamily Polydontinae of the family Sagdidae.

== Species ==
Species in the genus Granodomus include:

- Granodomus lima (Férussac, 1821)
