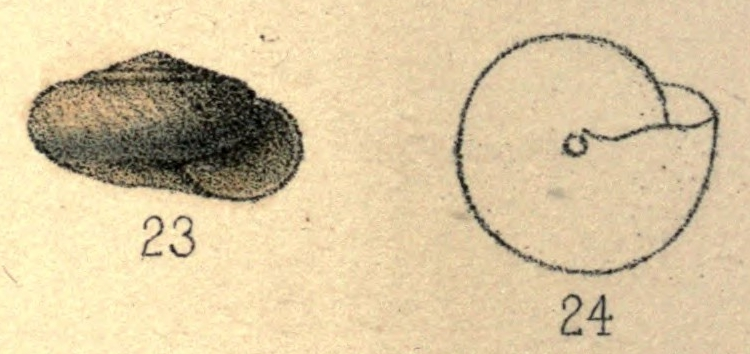
- Two views of shells of Hyalosagda similis

Scientific classification
- Domain: Eukaryota
- Kingdom: Animalia
- Phylum: Mollusca
- Class: Gastropoda
- Order: Stylommatophora
- Superfamily: Sagdoidea
- Family: Sagdidae
- Subfamily: Sagdinae
- Genus: Hyalosagda; Martens, 1860

= Hyalosagda =

Genus of gastropods

Hyalosagda is a genus of air-breathing land snails, terrestrial pulmonate gastropod mollusks in the subfamily Sagdinae of the family Sagdidae.

== Species ==
Species in the genus Hyalosagda include:

- Hyalosagda arboreoides
- Hyalosagda hollandi
- Hyalosagda osculans
- Hyalosagda selenina
- Hyalosagda similis - synonym: Helix ambigua
- Hyalosagda simplex - synonym: Helix delaminata
- Hyalosagda subaquila
- Hyalosagda turbiniformis
- Hyalosagda (Aerotrochus) turbonella (Morelet, 1851)

Hyalosagda (Aerotrochus) Pilsbry, 1926: synonym of Aerotrochus Pilsbry, 1926

== Bibliography ==
- Bank, R. A. (2017). Classification of the Recent terrestrial Gastropoda of the World. Last update: July 16, 2017.
