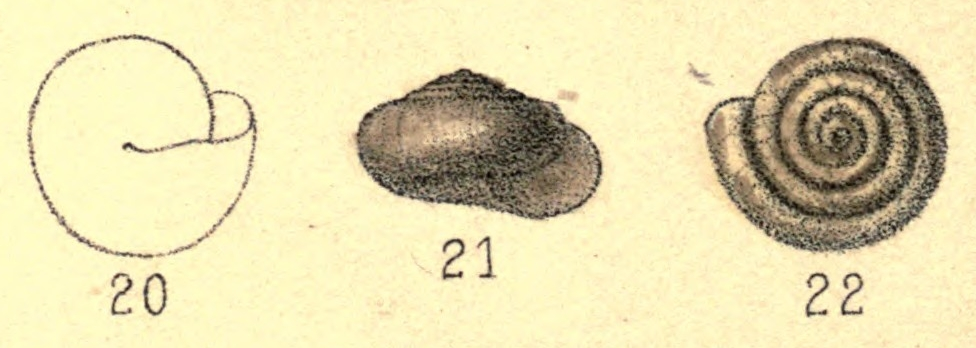
- Three views of a shell of Hyalosagda arboreoides

Scientific classification
- Kingdom: Animalia
- Phylum: Mollusca
- Class: Gastropoda
- Order: Stylommatophora
- Family: Sagdidae
- Genus: Hyalosagda
- Species: H. arboreoides

Binomial name
- Hyalosagda arboreoides (C. B Adams, 1845)

Synonyms
- Helix haldemanniana C. B Adams, 1845

= Hyalosagda arboreoides =

Species of gastropod

Hyalosagda arboreoides is a species of air-breathing land snail, a terrestrial pulmonate gastropod mollusc in the family Sagdidae.

== Distribution ==
This species occurs in Jamaica.
