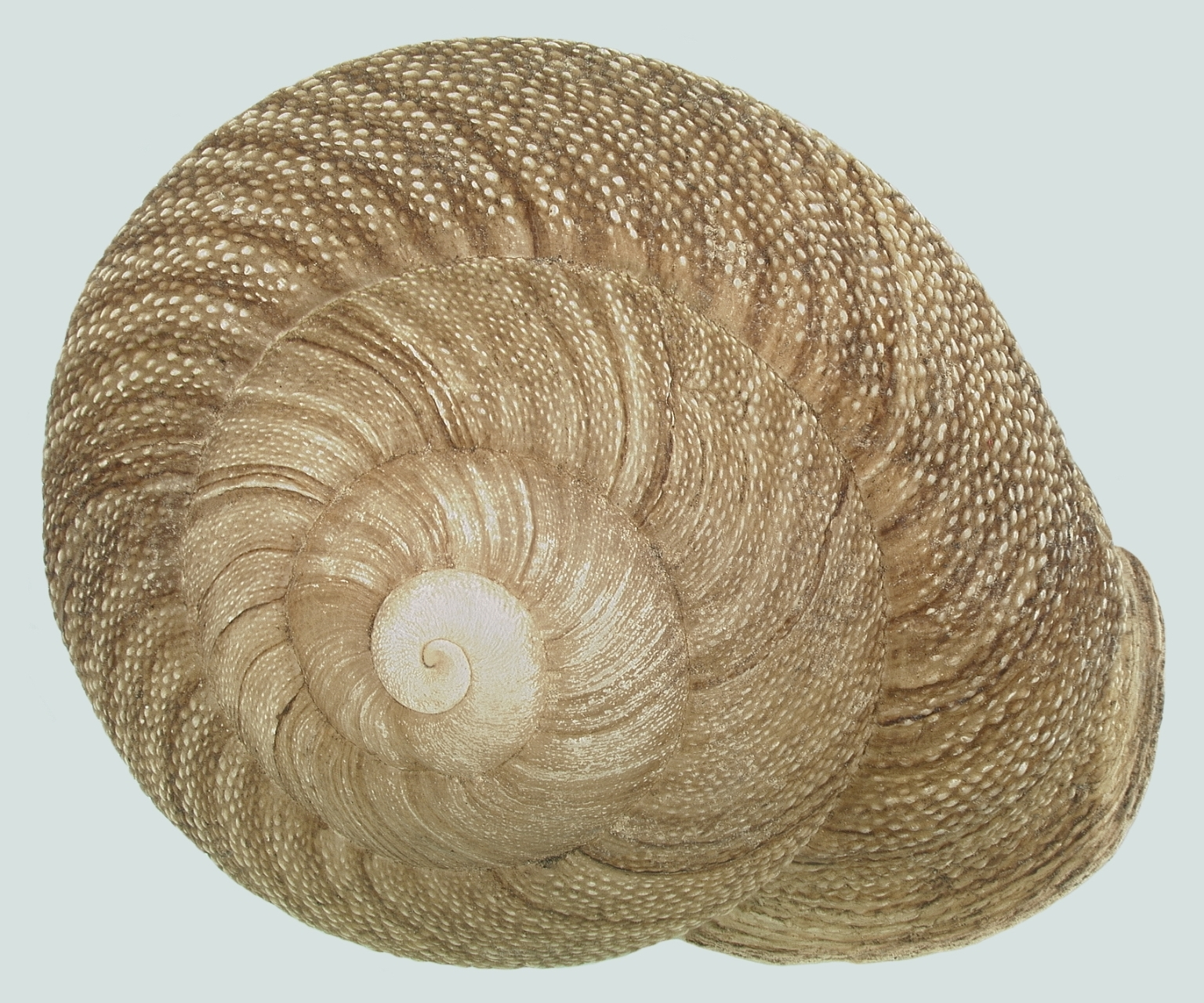
- Apical view of the shell of Granodomus lima

Scientific classification
- Kingdom: Animalia
- Phylum: Mollusca
- Class: Gastropoda
- Order: Stylommatophora
- Family: Sagdidae
- Genus: Granodomus
- Species: G. lima

Binomial name
- Granodomus lima (Férussac, 1821)

Synonyms
- Helix lima Férussac, 1821 (original combination); Polydontes lima (Férussac, 1821)

= Granodomus lima =

Species of gastropod

Granodomus lima is a species of air-breathing land snail, a terrestrial pulmonate gastropod mollusk in the family Sagdidae.

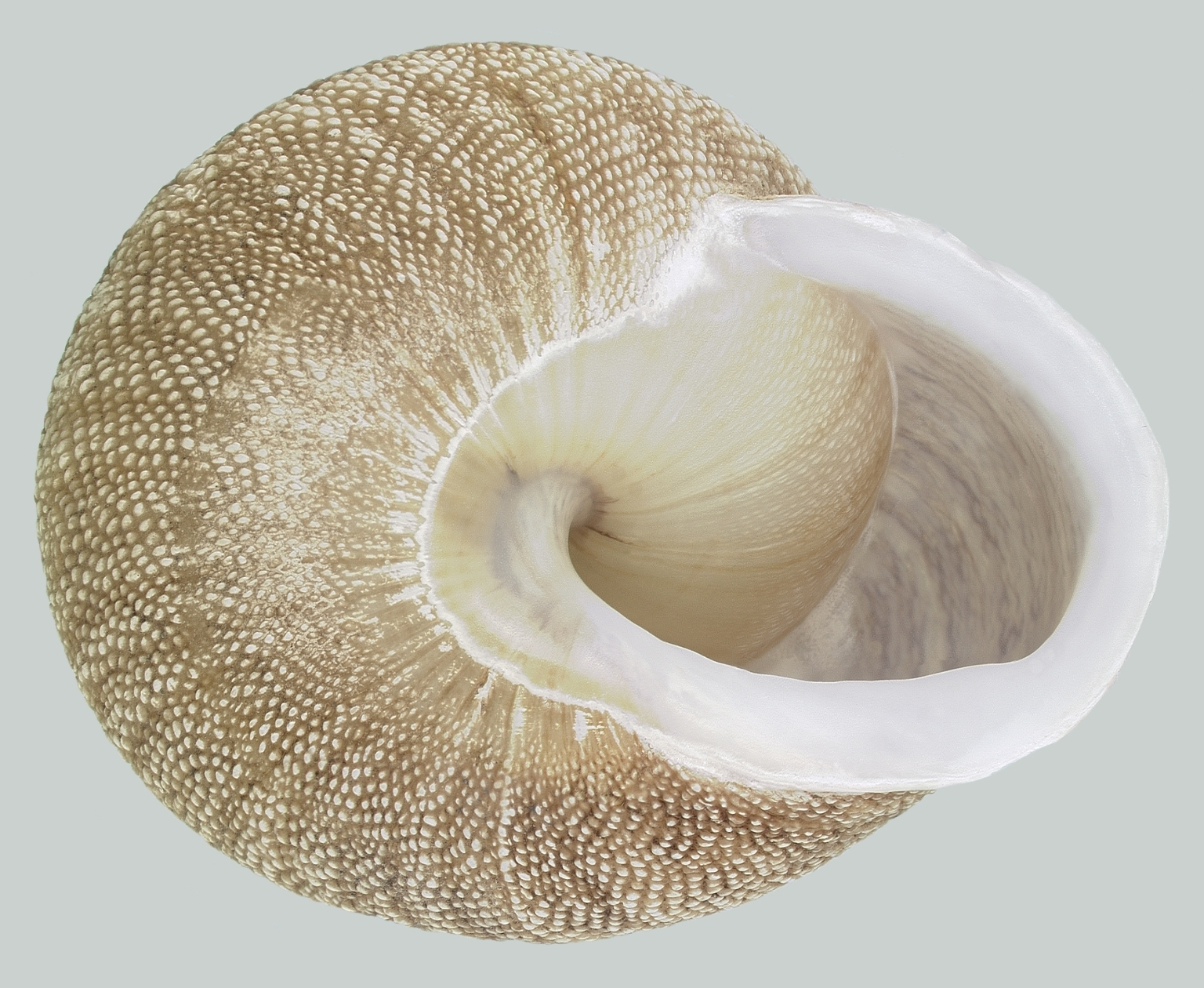
Umbilical view of the shell of Granodomus lima

== Distribution ==
This species occurs in Puerto Rico.
