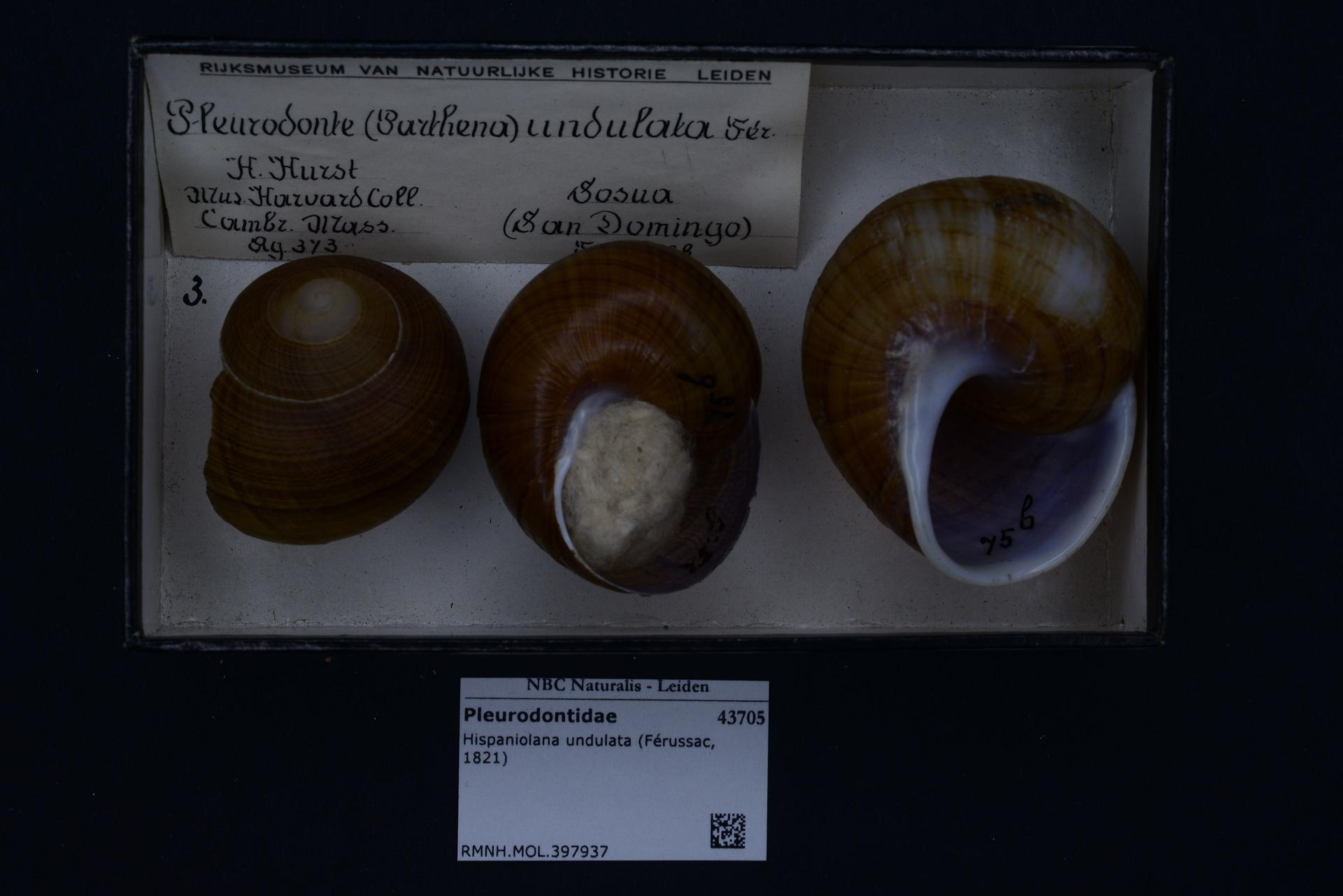
- Shell of Hispaniolana crispatus (specimen at Naturalis Biodiversity Center)

Scientific classification
- Kingdom: Animalia
- Phylum: Mollusca
- Class: Gastropoda
- Order: Stylommatophora
- Superfamily: Sagdoidea
- Family: Sagdidae
- Subfamily: Polydontinae
- Genus: Hispaniolana; Pilsbry, 1933

Type species
- Helix undulata Férussac, 1821

Synonyms
- Helix (Parthena) Albers, 1850 (original rank); Parthena Albers, 1850 (superseded combination); Polydontes (Hispaniolana) Pilsbry, 1933 (original rank)

= Hispaniolana =

Genus of gastropods

Hispaniolana is a genus of air-breathing land snails, terrestrial pulmonate gastropod mollusks in the subfamily Polydontinae of the family Sagdidae. The name comes from the island of Hispaniola, where all species are endemic to.

== Species ==
Species in the genus Hispaniolana include:

- Hispaniolana angustata (Férussac, 1822)
- Hispaniolana audebardi (Reeve, 1854)
- Hispaniolana crispatus (Férussac, 1821)
- Hispaniolana dissita (Deshayes, 1850)
- Hispaniolana dominicensis (L. Pfeiffer, 1850)
- Hispaniolana gabbi (Pilsbry, 1933)
- Hispaniolana gigantea (Scopoli, 1786)
- Hispaniolana mcleani (Clench, 1962)
- Hispaniolana montana (Clench, 1962)
- Hispaniolana obliterata (Férussac, 1822)
