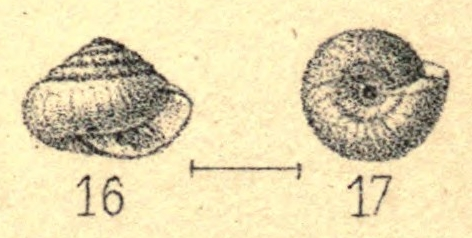
- Two views of a shell of Odontosagda blandii

Scientific classification
- Kingdom: Animalia
- Phylum: Mollusca
- Class: Gastropoda
- Order: Stylommatophora
- Family: Sagdidae
- Genus: Odontosagda
- Species: O. blandii

Binomial name
- Odontosagda blandii (Weinland, 1880)

Synonyms
- Hyalosagda blandii Weinland, 1880

= Odontosagda blandii =

Species of gastropod

Odontosagda blandii is a species of air-breathing land snail, a terrestrial pulmonate gastropod mollusc in the family Sagdidae.

== Distribution ==
This species occurs in Port-au-Prince in Haiti.
