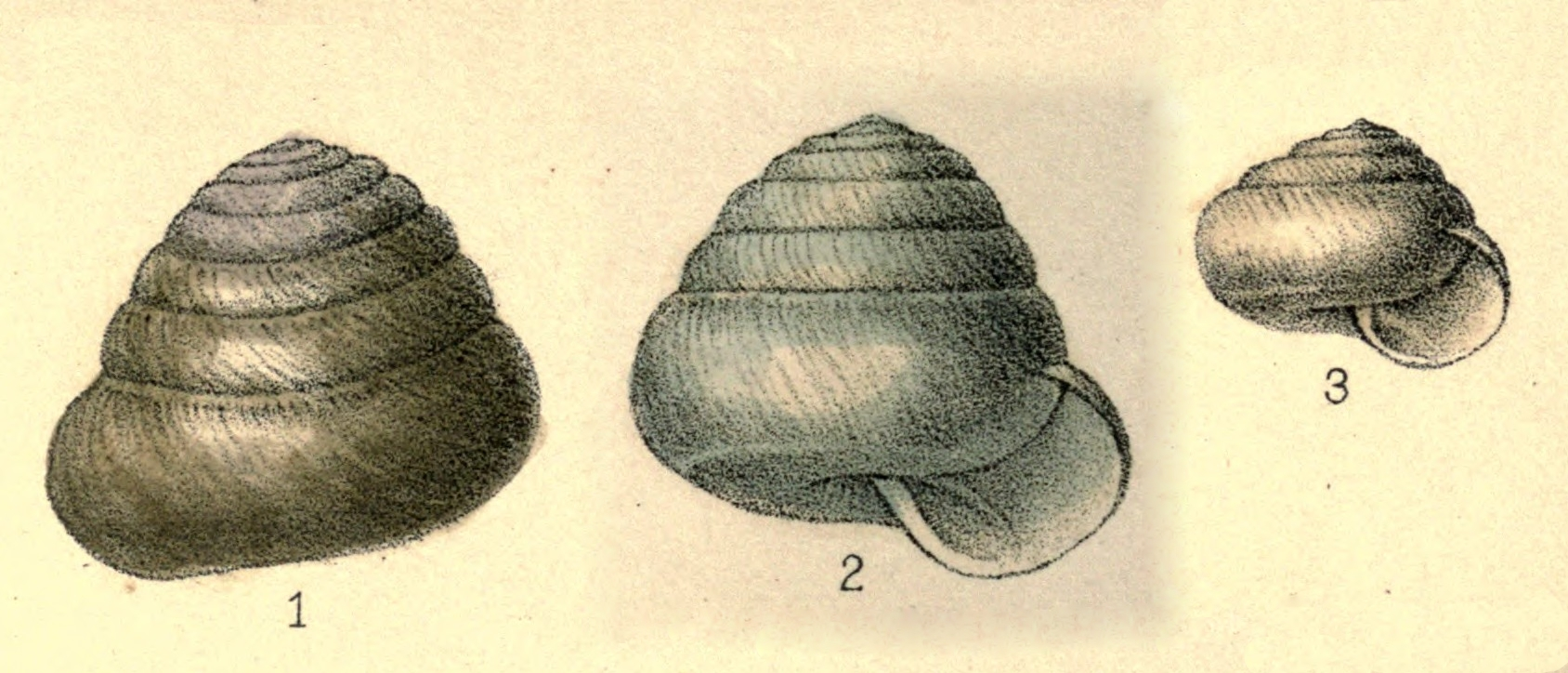
- Adult and juvenile shells of Sagda alligans

Scientific classification
- Kingdom: Animalia
- Phylum: Mollusca
- Class: Gastropoda
- Order: Stylommatophora
- Family: Sagdidae
- Subfamily: Sagdinae
- Genus: Sagda; Beck, 1837

= Sagda =

Genus of gastropods

Sagda is a genus of air-breathing land snails, terrestrial pulmonate gastropod mollusks in the family Sagdidae.

== Species ==
Species in the genus Sagda include:

- Sagda adamsiana
- Sagda alligans
- Sagda alveare
- Sagda anodon
- Sagda bondi
- Sagda centralis
- Sagda connectens
- Sagda cookiana - synonyms: Sagda australis, Epistylia conica
- Sagda delaminata
- Sagda epistylioides
- Sagda epistylium
- Sagda epistyloides - synonym: Sagda alveolata
- Sagda foremaniana
- Sagda grandis
- Sagda jamaicensis
- Sagda jayana
- Sagda kingswoodi
- Sagda lamellifera
- Sagda maxima
- Sagda minor
- Sagda montegoensis
- Sagda occidentalis
- Sagda osculans
- Sagda pila
- Sagda spei
- Sagda spiculosa
- Sagda torrefacta
- Sagda triptycha
