= Conus betulinus =

Conservation status
- Least Concern (IUCN 3.1)

Scientific classification
- Kingdom: Animalia
- Phylum: Mollusca
- Class: Gastropoda
- Subclass: Caenogastropoda
- Order: Neogastropoda
- Superfamily: Conoidea
- Family: Conidae
- Genus: Conus
- Species: C. betulinus

Binomial name
- Conus betulinus Linnaeus, 1758

Synonyms
- Cleobula betulina (Linnaeus, 1758); Conus (Dendroconus) betulinus Linnaeus, 1758 · accepted, alternate representation; Conus betulinus rufoluteus Bozzetti & Ferrario, 2005; Conus betulinus var. alternans Dautzenberg, 1937; Conus betulinus var. immaculata Dautzenberg, 1906; Conus betulinus var. medusa Gmelin, 1791; Conus betulinus var. paucimaculata Dautzenberg, 1937; Conus betulinus var. plurizonata Dautzenberg, 1937; Conus betulinus var. scripta Dautzenberg, 1937; Conus betulinus var. tabulata Dautzenberg, 1937; Conus deprehendens Prelle, 2009; Conus zulu Petuch, 1979; Cucullus lacteus Röding, 1798; Cucullus medusae Röding, 1798; Cucullus tigris Röding, 1798; Dendroconus betulinus(Linnaeus, 1758); Gastridium betulinus Salvat, B. & Rives, C. 1975

Species of sea snail

Conus betulinus, common name the betuline cone, is a species of sea snail, a marine gastropod mollusk in the family Conidae, the cone snails and their allies.

These snails are predatory and venomous. They are capable of stinging humans.

== Description ==
The size of the shell varies between 40 mm and 170 mm. The color of the shell is yellow orange-brown, or white, with revolving series of spots, and short lines of chocolate upon narrow white bands. The spire is radiated with chocolate. The base of the shell is strongly grooved.

== Distribution ==
This marine species occurs off

- Aldabra
- Chagos
- Madagascar
- Mascarene Basin
- Mauritius
- Mozambique
- Seychelles
- Tanzania

Also off Indo-China, Indo-Malaysia, Philippines, New Caledonia, Solomon Islands and Queensland, Australia.
