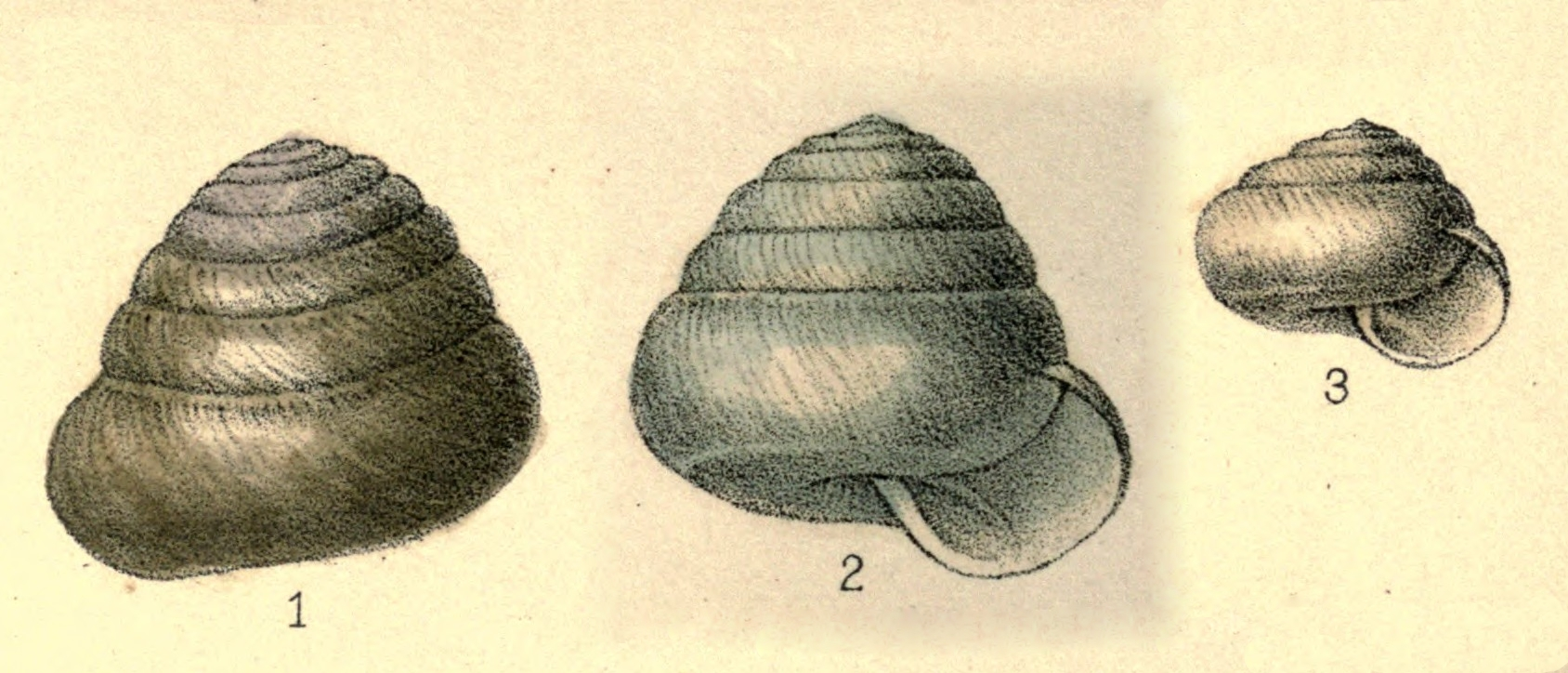
- Two adult shells and one juvenile shell of Sagda alligans

Scientific classification
- Kingdom: Animalia
- Phylum: Mollusca
- Class: Gastropoda
- Order: Stylommatophora
- Suborder: Helicina
- Superfamily: Sagdoidea
- Family: Sagdidae; Pilsbry, 1895

Type genus
- Sagda

= Sagdidae =

Family of gastropods

Sagdidae is a family of air-breathing land snails, terrestrial pulmonate gastropod mollusks with highest diversity in the Greater Antilles. It has been classified in its own superfamily Sagdoidea and as a member of the superfamily Helicoidea. Some species of Sagdidae are ovoviviparous.

== Anatomy ==
Vestigial love darts exist in some species within this family.

== Subfamilies and genera ==
The family Sagdidae consists of the following subfamilies:

- Aquebaninae H. B. Baker, 1940
- Platysuccineinae H. B. Baker, 1940
- Polydontinae Schileyko, 2006
- Sagdinae Pilsbry, 1895
- Yunqueinae Schileyko, 1998

Genera in the family Sagdidae include:

The type genus is Sagda Beck, 1837.

- Aerotrochus
- Aquebana
- Corneosagda
- Granodomus Wurtz, 1955
- Hispaniolana Pilsbry, 1933
- Hojeda
- Hyalosagda
- Lacteoluna
- Meiophysema
- Microsagda
- Odontosagda - Odontosagda blandii
- Platysuccinea
- Proserpinula
- Sagda
- Stauroglypta
- Strialuna
- Suavitas
- Trifaux
- Vilitas
- Volvidens
- Xenodiscula
- Zaphysema
