= A. belli =

A. belli may refer to:

- Abacetus belli, a ground beetle
- Allenella belli, the beautiful pinhead snail, a land snail found in Lord Howe Island
- Alvania belli, a prehistoric sea snail
- Amblyscirtes belli, Bell's roadside skipper, a butterfly found in the United States
- Ambulyx belli, a moth found in India
- Araeosoma belli, a sea urchin found in the Caribbean Sea and the Gulf of Mexico
- Argiolaus belli, a synonym of Iolaus belli, a butterfly found in Sierra Leone
- Artemisiospiza belli, Bell's sparrow, a bird found in North America
  - Amphispiza belli, a synonym of Artemisiospiza belli
- Asterodiscides belli, a starfish found in waters off the Seychelles and Somalia
