= Christianoconcha quintalia =

Conservation status
- Vulnerable (IUCN 2.3)

Scientific classification
- Kingdom: Animalia
- Phylum: Mollusca
- Class: Gastropoda
- Order: Stylommatophora
- Family: Punctidae
- Genus: Christianoconcha
- Species: C. quintalia

Binomial name
- Christianoconcha quintalia Iredale, 1945

Species of gastropod

Christianoconcha quintalia is a species of small air-breathing land snails, terrestrial gastropod mollusks in the family Punctidae, the dot snails. This species is endemic to Norfolk Island, Australia.
