= Paralaoma morti =

Scientific classification
- Domain: Eukaryota
- Kingdom: Animalia
- Phylum: Mollusca
- Class: Gastropoda
- Order: Stylommatophora
- Family: Punctidae
- Genus: Paralaoma
- Species: P. morti

Binomial name
- Paralaoma morti (Cox, 1864)
- Location of Lord Howe Island

Synonyms
- Helix morti Cox, 1864

Species of land snail

Paralaoma morti, also known as Mort's pinhead snail, is a species of land snail that is found on Australia's Lord Howe Island in the Tasman Sea.

== Taxonomy ==
This species is sometimes considered to be a synonym of P. caputspinulae or of P. servilis.

== Description ==
The depressedly turbinate shell of the mature snail is 1.1–1.3 mm in height, with a diameter of 1.7–2.4 mm, and a low spire. It is golden-brown in colour. The whorls are rounded and slightly shouldered, with impressed sutures and distinct, widely spaced radial ribs. It has a roundedly lunate aperture and widely open umbilicus.

== Distribution and habitat ==
The snail is common and widespread across the island.
