= Charopinesta sema =

Scientific classification
- Kingdom: Animalia
- Phylum: Mollusca
- Class: Gastropoda
- Order: Stylommatophora
- Family: Punctidae
- Genus: Charopinesta
- Species: C. sema

Binomial name
- Charopinesta sema (Iredale, 1944)
- Location of Lord Howe Island

Species of land snail

Charopinesta sema, also known as the Blackburn Island pinhead snail, is a species of land snail that is endemic to Australia's Lord Howe Island group in the Tasman Sea.

== Description ==
The depressedly turbinate to discoidal shell of the mature snail is 1.1 mm in height, with a diameter of 1.8 mm, and a low, stepped spire. It is pale golden in colour. The whorls are rounded, with deeply impressed sutures and moderately spaced radial ribs. It has a roundedly lunate aperture and widely open umbilicus.

== Distribution and habitat ==
This extremely rare snail is known from a single empty shell from Blackburn Island. It may be extinct.
