= Allenella planorum =

Scientific classification
- Domain: Eukaryota
- Kingdom: Animalia
- Phylum: Mollusca
- Class: Gastropoda
- Order: Stylommatophora
- Family: Punctidae
- Genus: Allenella
- Species: A. planorum

Binomial name
- Allenella planorum Iredale, 1944
- Location of Lord Howe Island

Synonyms
- Allentula planorum (Iredale, 1944); Allenella formalis planorum Iredale, 1944

Species of land snail

Allenella planorum, also known as the angular pinhead snail, is a species of land snail in the family Punctidae. It is endemic to Australia's Lord Howe Island in the Tasman Sea.

== Description ==
The turbinate shell of the mature snail is 2.3 mm in height, with a diameter of 3.4 mm, and a low conical spire. It is amber to light bronze in colour. The whorls are rounded above and below an angular periphery, with impressed sutures and closely spaced radial ribs. It has an ovately lunate aperture and narrowly open umbilicus.

== Distribution and habitat ==
The snail is most common in the North Beach and settlement areas of the island, with scattered records from elsewhere.
