= Paralaoma compar =

Scientific classification
- Kingdom: Animalia
- Phylum: Mollusca
- Class: Gastropoda
- Order: Stylommatophora
- Family: Punctidae
- Genus: Paralaoma
- Species: P. compar

Binomial name
- Paralaoma compar Iredale, 1944
- Location of Lord Howe Island

Species of land snail

Paralaoma compar, also known as the ribbed pinhead snail, is a species of land snail that is endemic to Australia's Lord Howe Island in the Tasman Sea.

== Description ==
The depressedly turbinate shell of the mature snail is 1.2–1.3 mm in height, with a diameter of 2.4–2.5 mm, and a low spire. It is deep golden-brown in colour. The whorls are rounded, with impressed sutures and moderately closely spaced radial ribs. It has a roundedly lunate aperture and moderately widely open umbilicus.

== Distribution and habitat ==
The snail is found on the summits and slopes of the southern mountains of the island.
