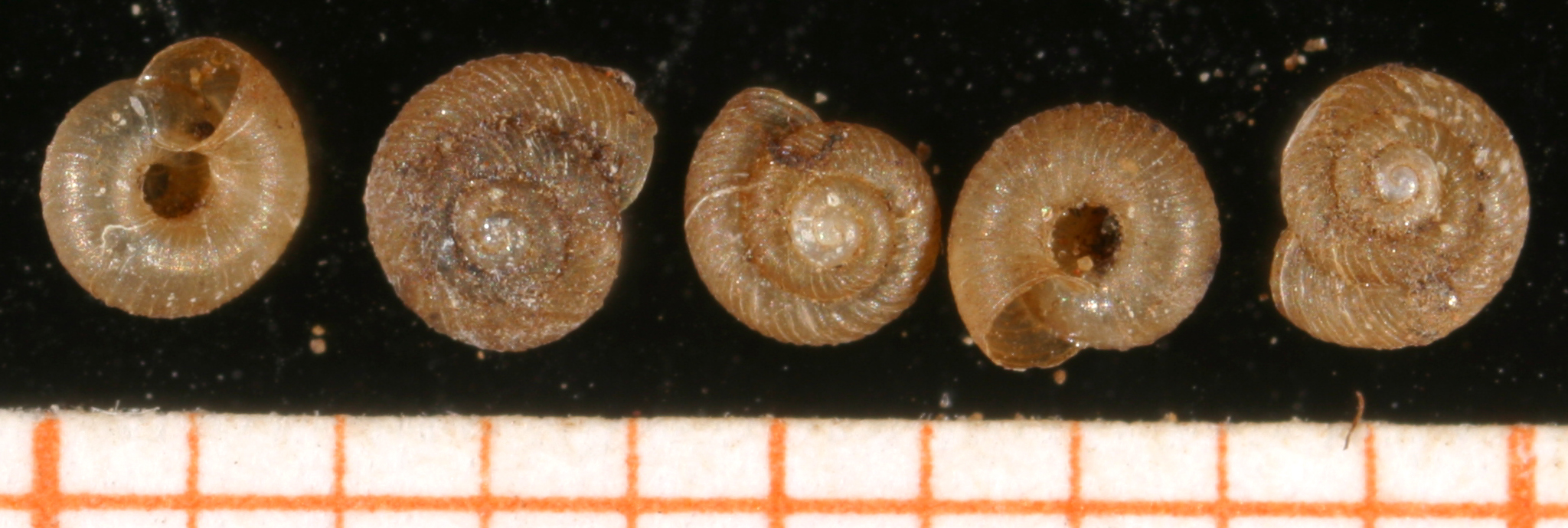
- Five shells of Paralaoma servilis

Scientific classification
- Kingdom: Animalia
- Phylum: Mollusca
- Class: Gastropoda
- Superorder: Eupulmonata
- Order: Stylommatophora
- Family: Punctidae
- Genus: Paralaoma; Iredale, 1913

Synonyms
- Fectola (Subfectola) Powell, 1939; Paraloma Iredale, 1913; Pleuropunctum Germain, 1928; Punctum (Toltecia) Pilsbry, 1926; Subfectola Powell, 1939; Toltecia Pilsbry, 1926

= Paralaoma =

Genus of land snails

Paralaoma is a genus of very small air-breathing land snails, terrestrial pulmonate gastropod mollusks or micromollusks in the subfamily Laominae of the family Punctidae, the dot snails.

== Species ==
The genus Paralaoma includes the following species:

- Paralaoma ahena Iredale, 1945
- Paralaoma allochroida (Suter, 1890)
- Paralaoma ambigua Iredale, 1913
- Paralaoma angusta Vermeulen, Liew & Schilthuizen, 2015
- Paralaoma annabelli Shea & Griffiths, 2010
- Paralaoma buddlei Powell, 1951
- Paralaoma burringtoni (Pilsbry, 1930)
- Paralaoma coloba (Pilsbry, 1894)
- Paralaoma compar Iredale, 1944
- Paralaoma depressior Preston, 1913
- Paralaoma gelida Iredale, 1941
- Paralaoma goweri Iredale, 1944
- Paralaoma hottentota (Melvill & Ponsonby, 1891)
- Paralaoma innesi Iredale, 1944
- Paralaoma insularis (Cotton, 1939)
- Paralaoma lateumbilicata (Suter, 1890)
- Paralaoma manawatawhia Goulstone & Brook, 1999
- Paralaoma mazatlanica (L. Pfeiffer, 1856)
- Paralaoma miserabilis (Iredale, 1913)
- Paralaoma morti (Cox, 1864)
- Paralaoma pagoda Climo, 1973
- Paralaoma perminuta Preston, 1913
- Paralaoma pilsbryi (Hylton Scott, 1957)
- Paralaoma raki Goulstone & Brook, 1999
- Paralaoma raricostata (Suter, 1890)
- Paralaoma regia Powell, 1948
- Paralaoma retinoides (Tate, 1894)
- Paralaoma sarawakensis Marzuki, T. S. Liew & Mohd-Azlan, 2021
- † Paralaoma senex B. A. Marshall & Worthy, 2017
- Paralaoma sericata (Suter, 1890)
- Paralaoma serratocostata (Webster, 1906)
- Paralaoma servilis (Shuttleworth, 1852)
- Paralaoma textilis (Pilsbry, 1920)
- † Paralaoma thomsoni (Suter, 1917)
- Paralaoma turbotti Powell, 1948

Synonyms

- Paralaoma abjecta Iredale, 1944: synonym of Semilaoma abjecta (Iredale, 1944) (original combination)
- Paralaoma angustum Vermeulen, Liew & Schilthuizen, 2015: synonym of Paralaoma angusta Vermeulen, Liew & Schilthuizen, 2015 (incorrect gender ending)
- Paralaoma caputspinulae (Reeve, 1852): synonym of Paralaoma servilis (Shuttleworth, 1852) (junior synonym)
- Paralaoma decresensis Iredale, 1937: synonym of Paralaoma caputspinulae (Reeve, 1852): synonym of Paralaoma servilis (Shuttleworth, 1852) (junior synonym)
- Paralaoma duncombei Iredale, 1945: synonym of Paralaoma caputspinulae (Reeve, 1852): synonym of Paralaoma servilis (Shuttleworth, 1852) (junior synonym)
- Paralaoma lidgbirdensis Iredale, 1944: synonym of Semilaoma lidgbirdensis (Iredale, 1944) (original combination)
- Paralaoma orestias Preston, 1913: synonym of Christianoconcha orestias (Preston, 1913) (original combination)
- Paralaoma pumila (Hutton, 1882): synonym of Paralaoma servilis (Shuttleworth, 1852)
- Paralaoma raoulensis Iredale, 1913: synonym of Paralaoma servilis (Shuttleworth, 1852) (junior synonym)
- Paralaoma royi Iredale, 1944: synonym of Paralaoma servilis (Shuttleworth, 1852) (junior synonym)
- Paralaoma stabilis Iredale, 1937: synonym of Paralaoma caputspinulae (Reeve, 1852): synonym of Paralaoma servilis (Shuttleworth, 1852) (junior synonym)
