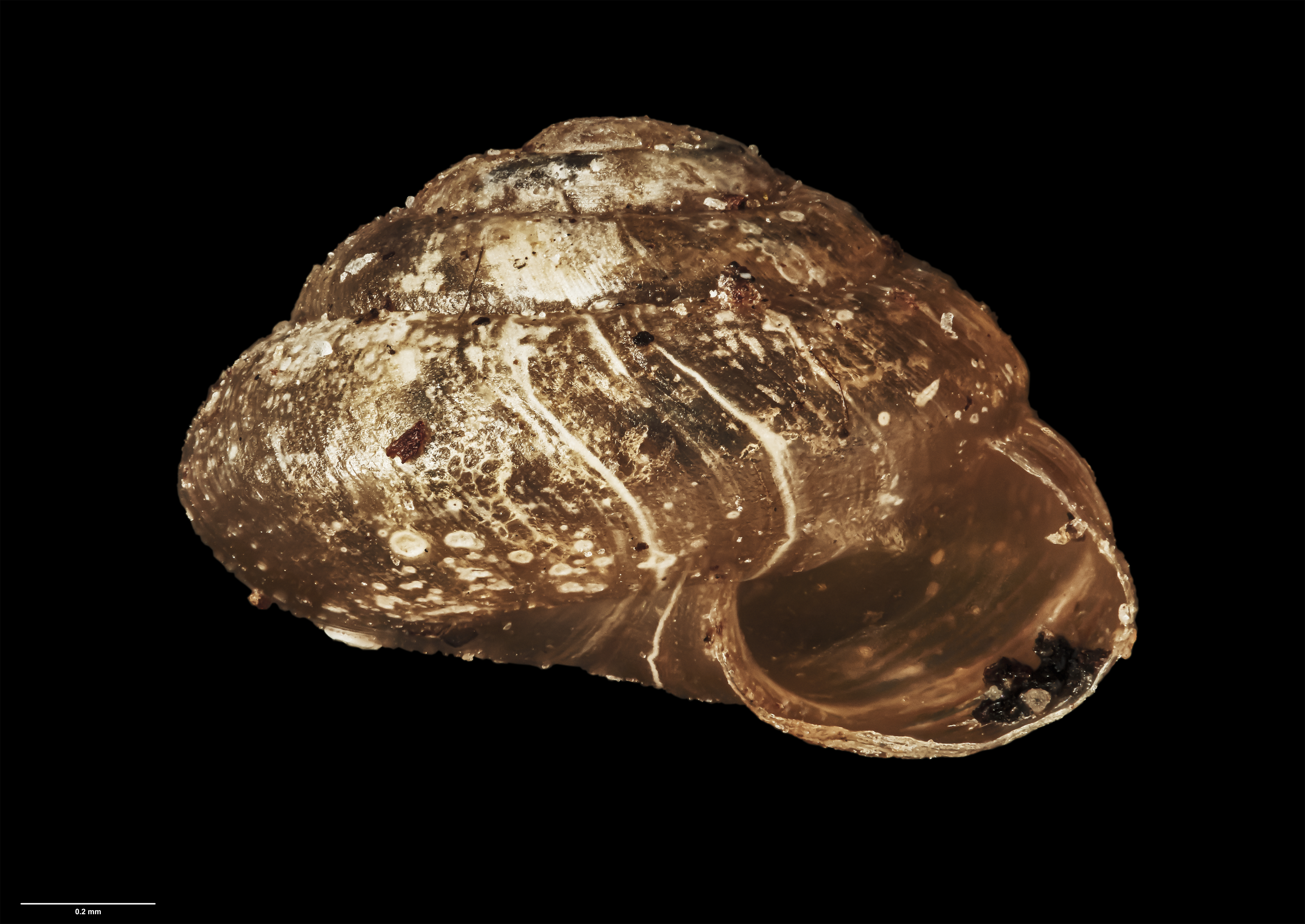
- Holotype

Conservation status
- Relict (NZ TCS)

Scientific classification
- Kingdom: Animalia
- Phylum: Mollusca
- Class: Gastropoda
- Order: Stylommatophora
- Family: Punctidae
- Subfamily: Laominae
- Genus: Kokikora
- Species: K. mimiwhangata

Binomial name
- Kokikora mimiwhangata Climo & Goulstone, 1995

= Kokikora mimiwhangata =

Species of land snail

Kokikora mimiwhangata is a species of land snail belonging to the family Punctidae. First described in 1995, the species is endemic to New Zealand, known only to occur in coastal habitats between the eastern Bay of Islands and Deep Water Cove in Northland, often in association nīkau palm leaf litter.

== Description ==
K. mimiwhangata shells are small (typically having a diameter of 1.4 mm (0.055 in)), typically having 4.25 whorls, and are turbinate, and are greenish brown in colour. In mature specimens, a step can be seen between the last two whorls and the higher whorls. The animals occasionally have blotches of yellow pigment. It can be differentiated from K. angulata due to being much smaller and having regular whorls (no expanded final whorl).

== Taxonomy ==
The species was described by Frank Climo and James Frederick Goulstone in 1995. In the same paper, Climo and Goulstone described the genus and the other known member of Kokiora. The holotype is held by the Auckland War Memorial Museum.

== Distribution and habitat ==
The species is endemic to New Zealand, occurring in a very restricted range between the eastern Bay of Islands and Deep Water Cove in Northland, The species primarily lives in coastal habitats, typically found in association with nīkau palm leaf litter.

== Gallery ==
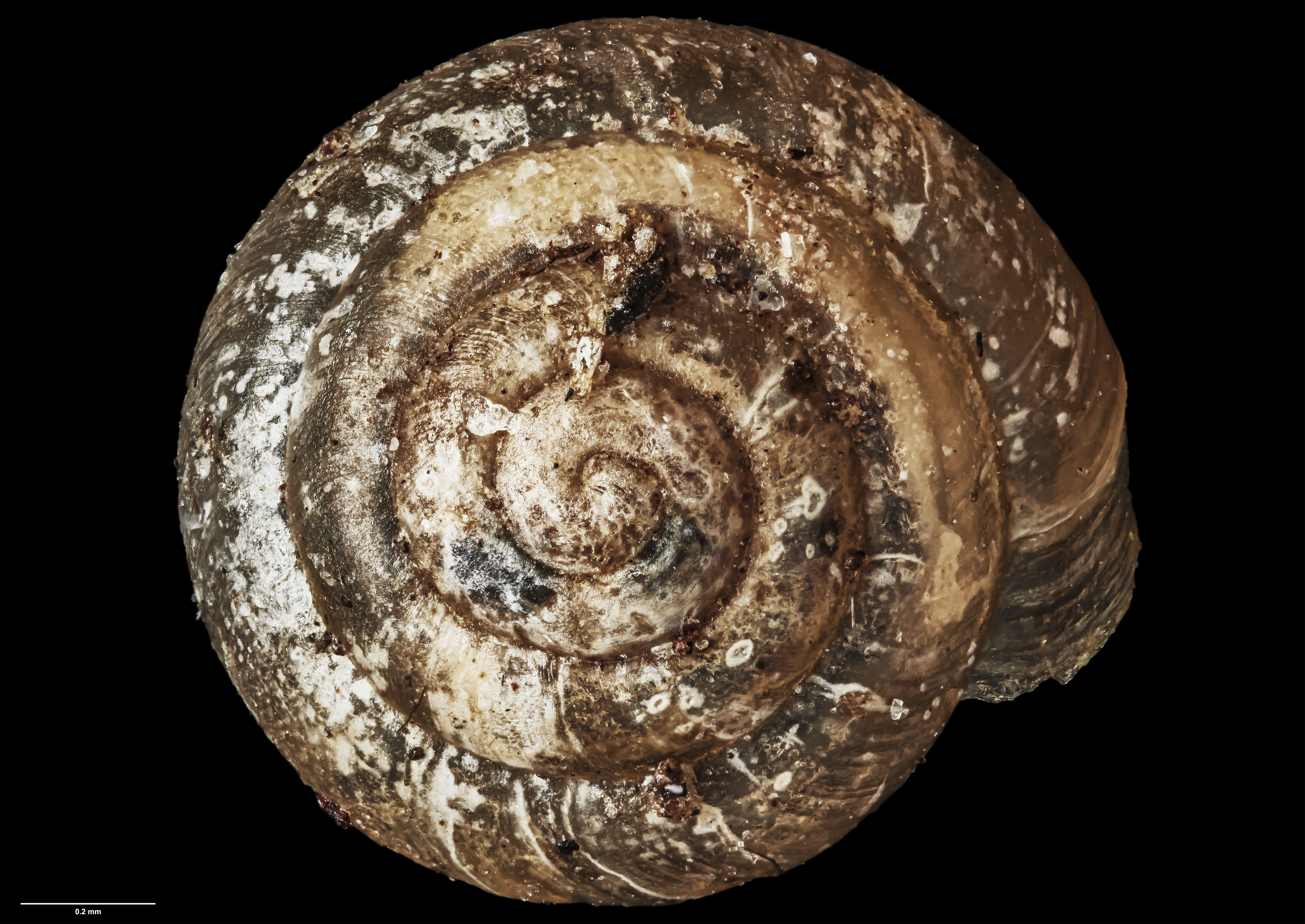
Top-down view of K. mimiwhangata holotype

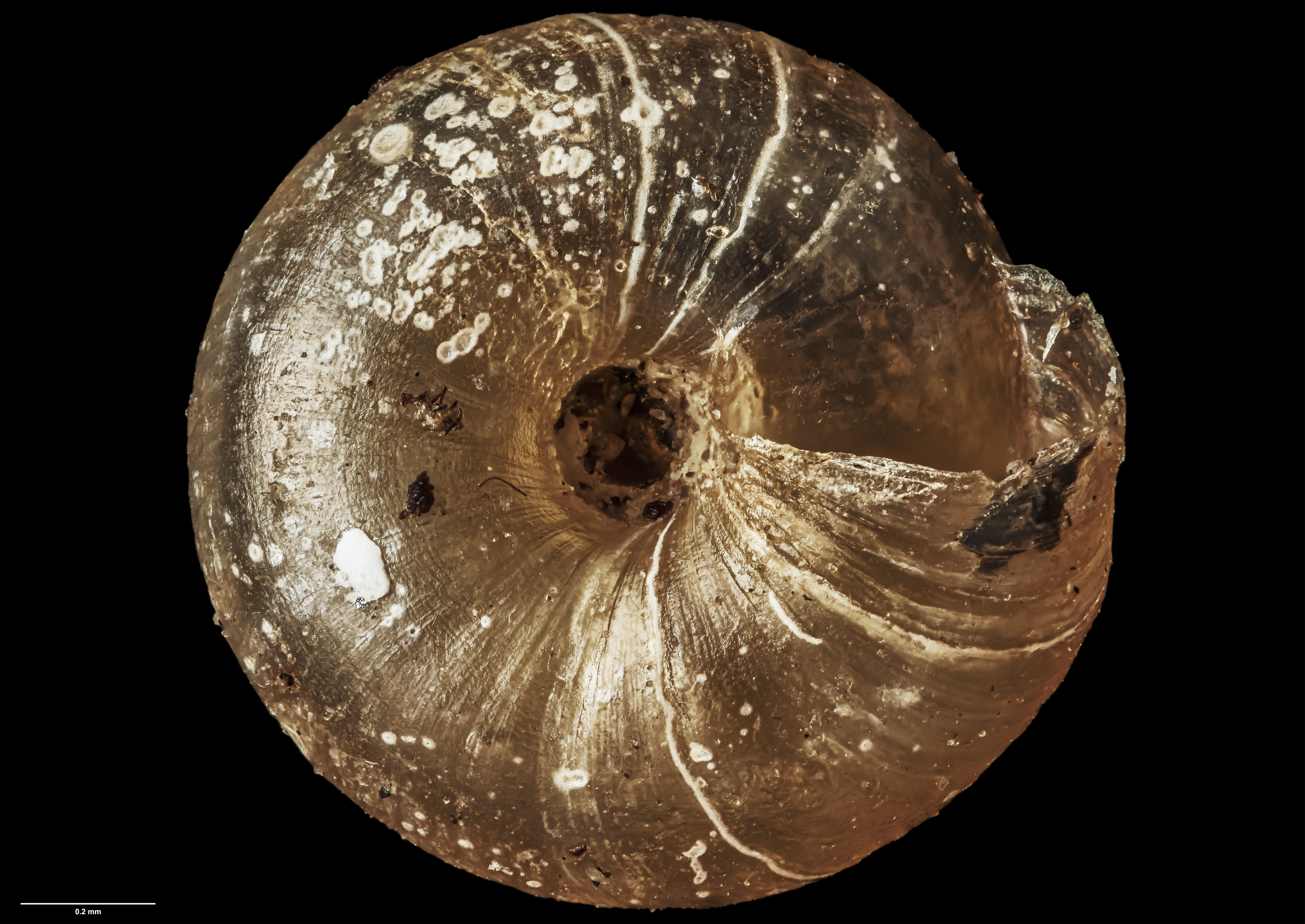
Underside view of K. mimiwhangata holotype
