= Semilaoma laevis =

Scientific classification
- Domain: Eukaryota
- Kingdom: Animalia
- Phylum: Mollusca
- Class: Gastropoda
- Order: Stylommatophora
- Family: Punctidae
- Genus: Semilaoma
- Species: S. laevis

Binomial name
- Semilaoma laevis Shea & Griffiths, 2010
- Location of Lord Howe Island

Species of land snail

Semilaoma laevis, also known as the smooth pinhead snail, is a tiny species of land snail that is endemic to Australia's Lord Howe Island in the Tasman Sea.

== Description ==
The depressedly turbinate shell of the mature snail is 0.7–0.8 mm in height, with a diameter of 1.2–1.3 mm, and a low spire. It is pale yellow to white in colour. The whorls are rounded. The sutures are impressed, with closely-spaced radial ribs. It has a roundly lunate aperture, and a narrowly open umbilicus. The animal is unknown.

== Distribution and habitat ==
The snail is common and widespread across the island, living in lowland forest, rainforest and scrub.
