= Pasmaditta jungermanniae =

Conservation status
- Vulnerable (IUCN 3.1)

Scientific classification
- Kingdom: Animalia
- Phylum: Mollusca
- Class: Gastropoda
- Order: Stylommatophora
- Family: Punctidae
- Genus: Pasmaditta
- Species: P. jungermanniae

Binomial name
- Pasmaditta jungermanniae (Petterd, 1879)

Species of gastropod

Pasmaditta jungermanniae is a species of land snail in the family Punctidae, the dot snails. It is known by the common name Cataract Gorge snail. It is endemic to Tasmania in Australia, where it is known from only one location.

This snail has a small, flattened shell no more than 3 millimeters wide. The light brown, glossy shell has 4 to 5 whorls. The body of the snail is black.

This snail has been recorded in a single location, Cataract Gorge in northern Tasmania. Its entire range is about 2 square kilometers. There are three subpopulations which are divided by a river and a patch of exotic vegetation. The snail lives in a wet forest and cliff-face habitat.

The entire population size is probably at least several thousand individuals, sometimes appearing in large numbers in one small portion of the habitat. There are no current direct threats, but because the entire population lives in a very small area, any of several potential threats may affect the species as a whole in the future.
