= Paralaoma innesi =

Scientific classification
- Kingdom: Animalia
- Phylum: Mollusca
- Class: Gastropoda
- Order: Stylommatophora
- Family: Punctidae
- Genus: Paralaoma
- Species: P. innesi

Binomial name
- Paralaoma innesi Iredale, 1944
- Location of Lord Howe Island

Species of land snail

Paralaoma innesi, also known as Innes' pinhead snail, is a species of land snail that is endemic to Australia's Lord Howe Island in the Tasman Sea.

== Description ==
The depressedly turbinate shell of the mature snail is 0.95 mm in height, with a diameter of 1.7 mm, and a low spire. It is golden in colour. The whorls are rounded and slightly shouldered, with impressed sutures and closely spaced radial ribs. It has a roundedly lunate aperture and moderately widely open umbilicus.

== Distribution and habitat ==
The snail is most abundant on the summits of the southern mountains of the island.
