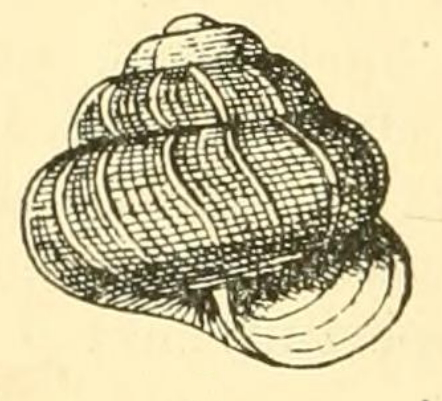
- Drawing of a shell of Taguahelix francesci (holotype)

Scientific classification
- Kingdom: Animalia
- Phylum: Mollusca
- Class: Gastropoda
- Order: Stylommatophora
- Family: Punctidae
- Genus: Taguahelix
- Species: T. francesci

Binomial name
- Taguahelix francesci (W. H. Webster, 1904)

Synonyms
- Laoma (Phrixgnathus) francesci W. H. Webster, 1904 superseded combination)

= Taguahelix francesci =

Species of sea snail

Taguahelix francesci is a species of terrestrial snail in the family Punctidae.

== Description ==
The length of the shell attains 2 mm, its diameter 1.75 mm.

(Original description) The turbinate shell is dark brown and dull. The shell contains 4½ rounded whorls. The protoconch consists of 1½ concentrically striate whorls. The remaining whorls, besides concentric wavy striae, show 4—5 radiate, brown, white-edged, periostracal processes per millim., directed backward, with many hairlike growth-lines between. The suture is deep. The periphery is rounded. The umbilicus is narrow and pervious. The outer lip is simple, the margins slightly converging. The columella is vertical, reflexed above and slightly covers the umbilicus. The base of the shell is rounded.

== Distribution ==
This species is endemic to New Zealand and occurs on North Island.
