= Paralaoma turbotti =

Conservation status
- Naturally Uncommon (NZ TCS)

Scientific classification
- Kingdom: Animalia
- Phylum: Mollusca
- Class: Gastropoda
- Order: Stylommatophora
- Family: Punctidae
- Genus: Paralaoma
- Species: P. turbotti

Binomial name
- Paralaoma turbotti Powell, 1948

Species of land snail

Paralaoma turbotti is a species of land snail in the family Punctidae. The species was first described by Baden Powell in 1948, and is endemic to Manawatāwhi / Three Kings Islands in New Zealand.

== Taxonomy ==
The species was identified by Powell in 1948, based on a shell collected from Manawatāwhi / Great Island in 1945 by Graham Turbott, who discovered the shell on the underside of decaying wood in leaf mold, in an area of kanuka scrub. Powell named the species after Turbott.

In 1999, specimens that had previously been identified as P. turbotti by Frank Climo in 1973 were described two new species, Paralaoma manawatawhia and Paralaoma raki. These species share a habitat and have overlapping distributions, suggesting that Quaternary sea level changes may have fragmented populations of Paralaoma, leading to speciation.

== Description ==
Powell's original text (the type description) reads as follows:

Shell minute, depressed-turbinate, narrowly umbilicated, closely radially costate, microscopically densely spirally striate, thin, shining, uniformly light brown. Spire slightly taller than height of aperture. Suture deeply impressed. Whorls 4½, slowly increasing, including a low rounded protoconch of 1½ microscopically spirally striated whorls. Post-nuclear sculpture of numerous somewhat irregular rounded radial ribs, stronger on dorsal surface; about 60 on the penultimate and approximately 90 on the body-whorl. The whole surface crowded with dense, microscopic, spiral, linear-spaced lirations, interstial on the dorsal surface but crossing the weakened radials of the base. Umbilicus deep, narrow and straight sided, about one-eighth major diameter of the base. Aperture lunate, with thin outer lip. Inner lip reflexed, partly concealing the umbilicus. Major diameter, 1.6 mm (0.063 in).; minimum diameter, 1.45 mm (0.057 in).: height, 1.00 mm (0.039 in) (holotype).

The species has a uniformly pile brown-coloured shell. The shell of the species is morphologically very similar to Paralaoma buddlei, however is much smaller compared to P. buddlei. They can be distinguished from P. manawatawhia due to the shells of this species being brown, bigger and having heavier ribbing.

== Distribution and habitat ==
The species is endemic to New Zealand, found on islands of the Manawatāwhi / Three Kings Islands group: Manawatāwhi / Great Island and Moekawa / South West Island. The snail lives primarily in broaflead forest and kanuka leaf litter.
