= Charopinesta goweri =

Scientific classification
- Kingdom: Animalia
- Phylum: Mollusca
- Class: Gastropoda
- Order: Stylommatophora
- Family: Punctidae
- Genus: Charopinesta
- Species: C. goweri

Binomial name
- Charopinesta goweri (Iredale, 1944)
- Location of Lord Howe Island

Species of land snail

Charopinesta goweri, also known as the Mount Gower pinhead snail, is a species of land snail that is endemic to Australia's Lord Howe Island in the Tasman Sea.

== Description ==
The depressedly turbinate to discoidal shell of the mature snail is 1.1 mm in height, with a diameter of 1.7 mm, and a low spire. It is golden amber in colour. The whorls are slightly rounded, with impressed sutures and fine, closely spaced radial ribs. It has a roundedly lunate aperture and moderately widely open umbilicus. The animal (in alcohol) is white with grey markings.

== Distribution and habitat ==
This rare snail has only been recorded from the summit of Mount Gower and the mid slopes of Mount Lidgbird, but is presumed to inhabit the mid to upper slopes of both of the southern mountains of the island. It lives on trees in rainforest.
