= Semilaoma costata =

- Computerized Image of Lord Howe Island

Scientific classification
- Domain: Eukaryota
- Kingdom: Animalia
- Phylum: Mollusca
- Class: Gastropoda
- Order: Stylommatophora
- Family: Punctidae
- Genus: Semilaoma
- Species: S. costata

Binomial name
- Semilaoma costata Shea & Griffiths, 2010
- Location of Lord Howe Island

Species of land snail

Semilaoma costata, also known as the coarse-ribbed pinhead snail, is a tiny species of land snail that is endemic to Australia's Lord Howe Island in the Tasman Sea.

== Description ==
The subdiscoidal shell of the mature snail is 0.7–0.8 mm in height, with a diameter of 1.3–1.5 mm, and a low to flat spire. It is pale yellow to white in colour. The whorls are rounded to shouldered. The sutures are impressed, with moderately closely-spaced radial ribs. It has an ovately lunate aperture, and a moderately wide umbilicus. The animal is unknown.

== Distribution and habitat ==
The snail is common and widespread in the North Bay and settlement areas of the island, living in plant litter.
