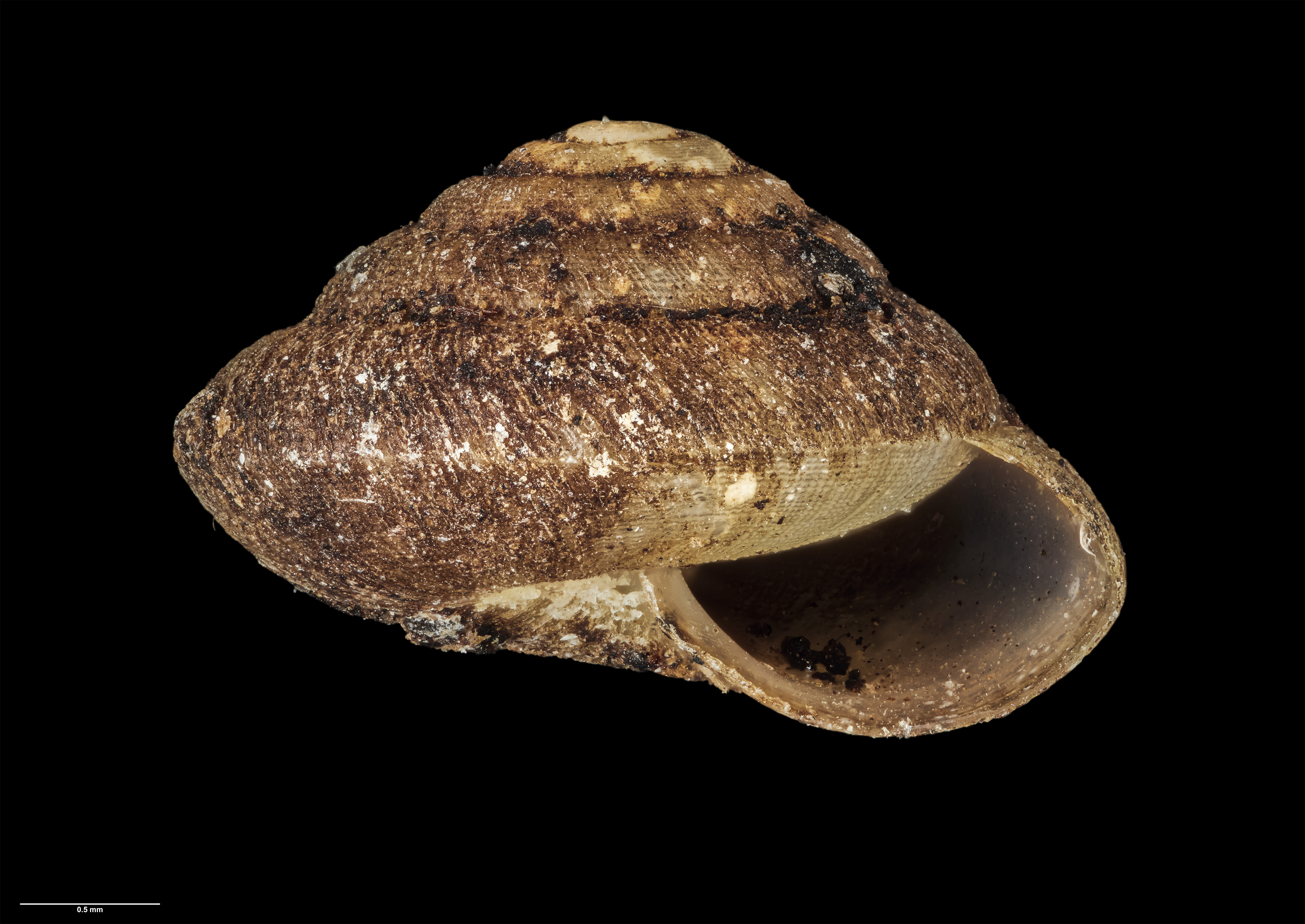
- Holotype

Conservation status
- Naturally Uncommon (NZ TCS)

Scientific classification
- Kingdom: Animalia
- Phylum: Mollusca
- Class: Gastropoda
- Order: Stylommatophora
- Family: Punctidae
- Subfamily: Laominae
- Genus: Laomarex
- Species: L. sericea

Binomial name
- Laomarex sericea A. W. B. Powell, 1948

= Laomarex sericea =

Species of land snail

Laomarex sericea is a species of land snail belonging to the family Punctidae. It is endemic to Manawatāwhi / Three Kings Islands, northwest of mainland New Zealand.

== Description ==
In the original description, Powell described the species as below:

Shell small, depressed, broadly conical with angulate periphery and deep narrow umbilicus. Spire 1½ times height of aperture, outlines broadly convex. Whorls 6, including a low dome-shaped protoconch of 1½ whorls, distinctly sculptured with twelve dense beaded spirals and followed by a half-whorl of closely spaced radials. Post-nuclear sculpture of extremely dense and fine membranous radials, over 200 on the penultimate, overlying a surface sculpture of fine dense spiral threads. Dorsal surface and base similarly sculptured. Umbilicus a deep narrow pit. Colour dull brown, showing an obscure pattern of rather wide-spaced reddish-brown radial stripes.

The shell of the holotype has a diameter of 3.25 mm (0.128 in), and a height of 2.00 mm (0.079 in). Features not remarked upon by Powell include the punctine reproductive system, the radula formula, or the short bristles found at the intersection of the shell's radial and spiral sculpture, which were elaborated upon by Frank Climo in 1973.

== Taxonomy ==
The species was first described by A. W. B. Powell in 1948, who named L. sericea as the type species for the genus Laomarex. The genus was monotypic until 1973. The holotype was found on Oromaki / North East Island in leaf mould by G. A. Buddle in January 1948, and is held by the Auckland War Memorial Museum.

== Distribution and habitat ==
L. sericea is endemic to Manawatāwhi / Three Kings Islands, known to occur on Manawatāwhi / Great Island, Oromaki / North East Island and Moekawa / South West Island. The species has typically been found under stones and in leaf mould of forest remnants.

== Gallery ==
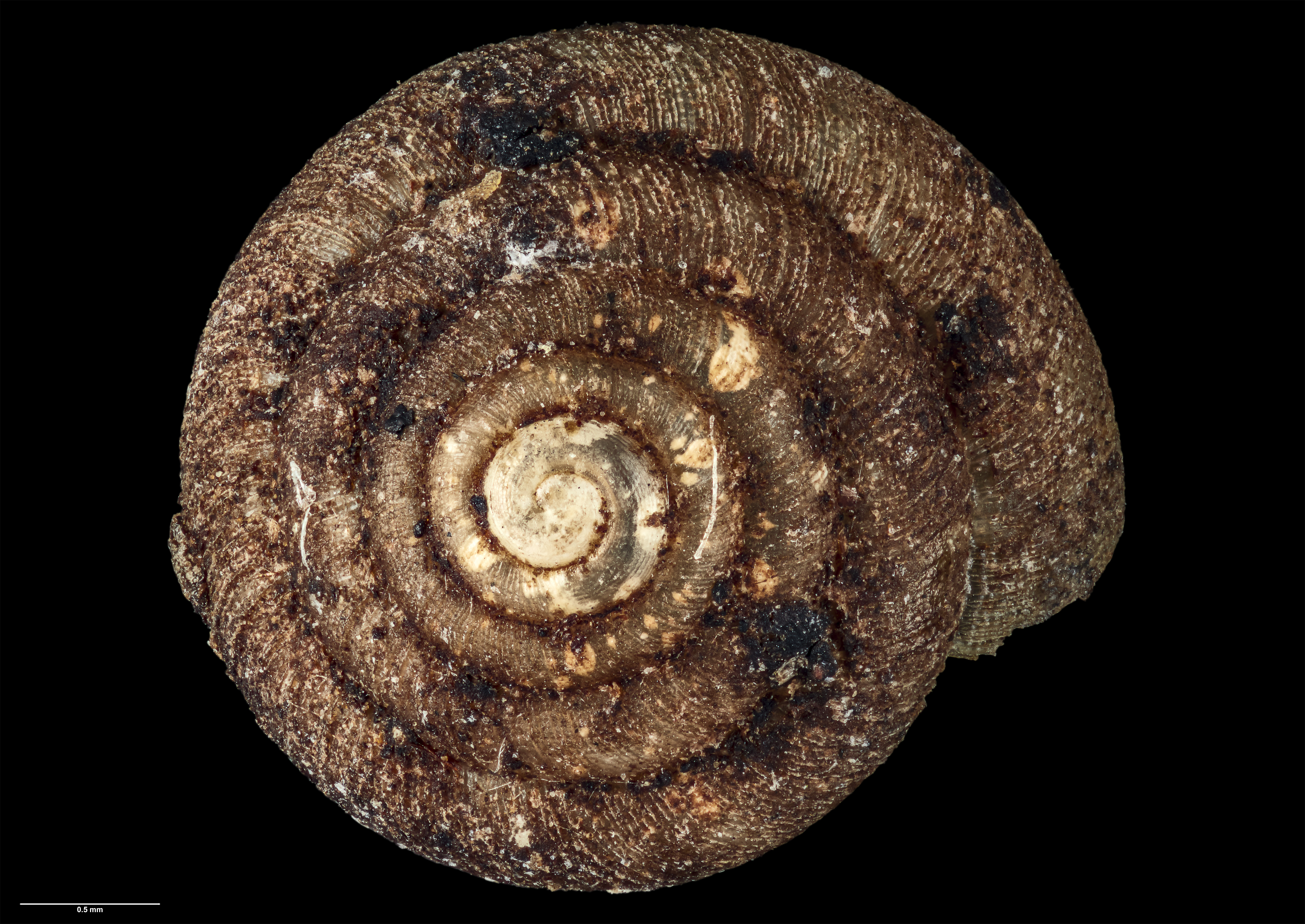
Above view of holotype

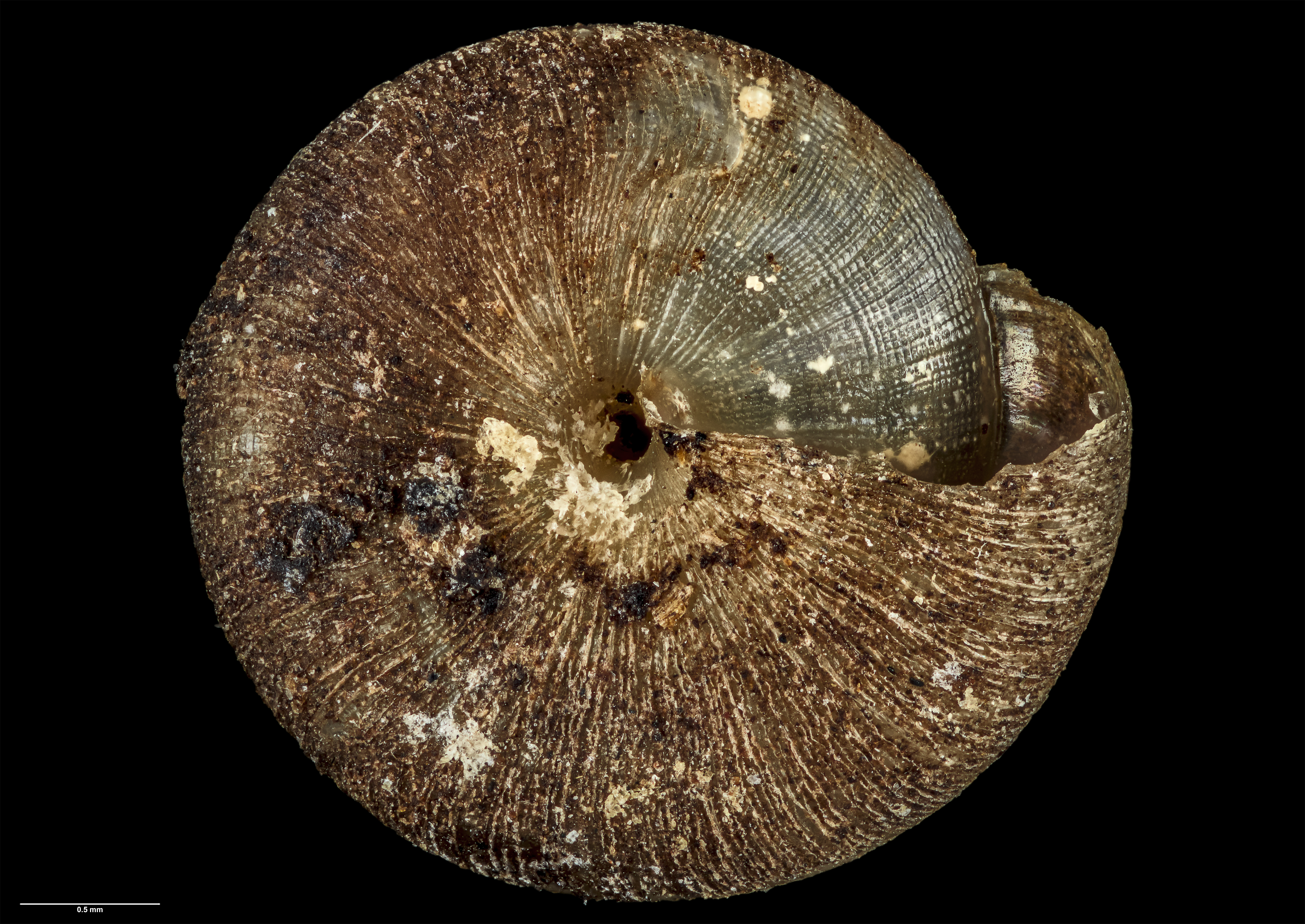
Underside view of holotype
