= Pernastela howensis =

Scientific classification
- Kingdom: Animalia
- Phylum: Mollusca
- Class: Gastropoda
- Order: Stylommatophora
- Family: Punctidae
- Genus: Pernastela
- Species: P. howensis

Binomial name
- Pernastela howensis Iredale, 1944
- Location of Lord Howe Island

Species of land snail

Pernastela howensis, also known as the Lord Howe pinhead snail, is a tiny species of land snail that is endemic to Australia's Lord Howe Island in the Tasman Sea.

== Description ==
The trochoidal shell of the mature snail is 1.8–2.1 mm in height, with a diameter of 3–3.3 mm, and a raised spire. It is cream to pale golden-brown in colour. The whorls are shouldered and sutures impressed, with widely spaced radial ribs. It has an roundly lunate aperture, flattened on the upper side by the reflected lip, and a moderately wide umbilicus. The animal is unknown.

== Distribution and habitat ==
The snail is known only from three worn shells collected from the summit of Mount Gower in 1912, and it may be extinct.
