= Pernastela gnoma =

- Location of Lord Howe Island

Scientific classification
- Kingdom: Animalia
- Phylum: Mollusca
- Class: Gastropoda
- Order: Stylommatophora
- Family: Punctidae
- Genus: Pernastela
- Species: P. gnoma

Binomial name
- Pernastela gnoma Iredale, 1944
- Location of Lord Howe Island

Species of land snail

Pernastela gnoma, also known as the dwarf pinhead snail, is a tiny species of land snail that is endemic to Australia's Lord Howe Island in the Tasman Sea.

== Description ==
The trochoidal shell of the mature snail is 0.8 mm in height, with a diameter of 1.2–1.3 mm, and a moderate spire. It is golden-brown in colour. The whorls are shouldered and sutures impressed, with moderately spaced radial ribs. It has an ovately lunate aperture and a narrow umbilicus.

== Distribution and habitat ==
The snail is common and widespread across the island, inhabiting plant litter.
