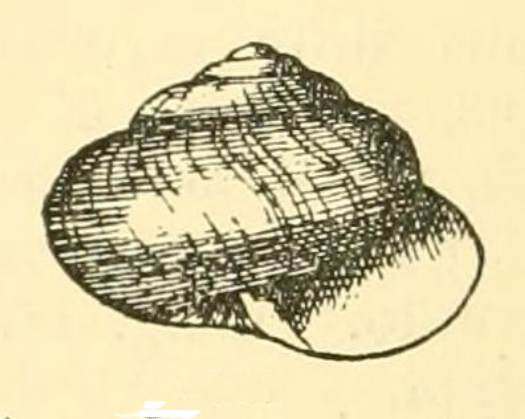
- Drawing of a shell of Taguahelix elaiodes (holotype)

Scientific classification
- Kingdom: Animalia
- Phylum: Mollusca
- Class: Gastropoda
- Order: Stylommatophora
- Family: Punctidae
- Genus: Taguahelix
- Species: T. elaiodes

Binomial name
- Taguahelix elaiodes (W. H. Webster, 1904)

Synonyms
- Laoma (Phrixgnathus) elaiodes W. H. Webster, 1904 superseded combination)

= Taguahelix elaiodes =

Species of sea snail

Taguahelix elaiodes is a species of terrestrial snail in the family Punctidae.

== Description ==
The length of the shell attains 3 mm, its diameter 2 mm.

(Original description) The turbinate shell is olive-green and shining. The shell contains 4½, rounded whorls. The protoconch consists of 1½ concentrically striate whorls. The remaining whorls are irregularly, radiately, finely striate and substriate with about 10 striations per millim., the substriations are variable in number and extent, both directed backwards. the whole shell is concentrically wave-striated. The suture is deep. The periphery is rounded. The umbilicus is narrow and pervious. The outer lip is simple, the margins slightly converging. The columella is vertical, reflexed above and slightly covers the umbilicus. The base of the shell is rounded

== Distribution ==
This species is endemic to New Zealand and occurs on North Island.
