= Allenella formalis =

Scientific classification
- Domain: Eukaryota
- Kingdom: Animalia
- Phylum: Mollusca
- Class: Gastropoda
- Order: Stylommatophora
- Family: Punctidae
- Genus: Allenella
- Species: A. formalis

Binomial name
- Allenella formalis Iredale, 1944
- Location of Lord Howe Island

Synonyms
- Allentula formalis (Iredale, 1944)

Species of land snail

Allenella formalis, also known as the brown turban pinhead snail, is a species of land snail in the family Punctidae. It is endemic to Australia's Lord Howe Island in the Tasman Sea.

== Description ==
The globosely turbinate shell of the mature snail is 2.5–2.6 mm in height, with a diameter of 3.4–3.6 mm, and a moderately raised conical spire. It is amber to dark brown in colour. The whorls are rounded above and below a slightly angular periphery, with impressed sutures and closely spaced radial ribs. It has an ovately lunate aperture and narrowly open umbilicus. The animal is dark brown with a paler brown sole.

== Distribution and habitat ==
The snail occurs on the summits and upper slopes of the island's southern mountains.
