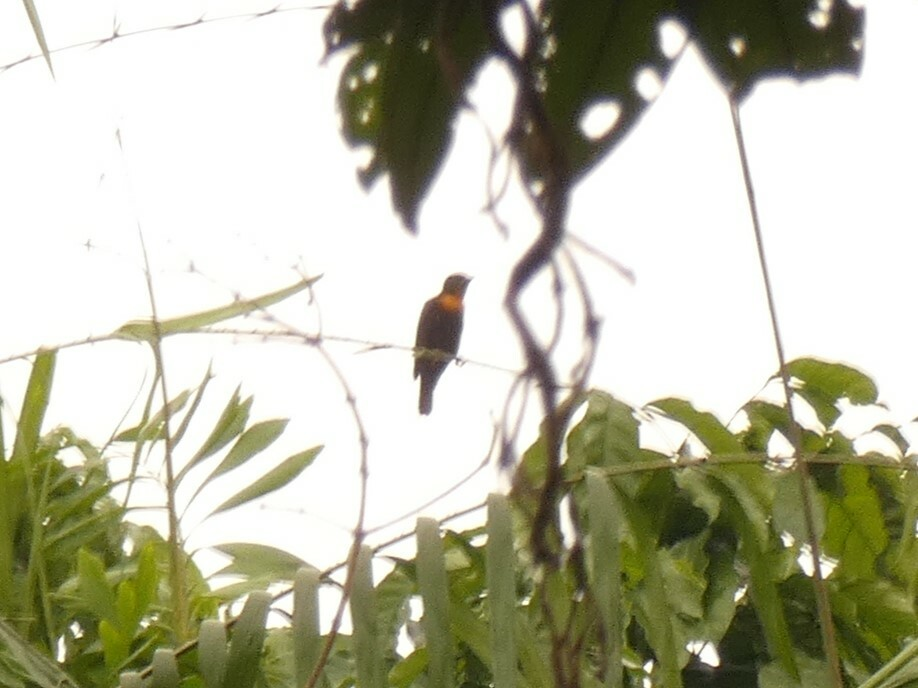

Conservation status
- Least Concern (IUCN 3.1)

Scientific classification
- Kingdom: Animalia
- Phylum: Chordata
- Class: Aves
- Order: Passeriformes
- Family: Ploceidae
- Genus: Malimbus
- Species: M. racheliae

Binomial name
- Malimbus racheliae (Cassin, 1857)

= Rachel's malimbe =

Species of bird

Rachel's malimbe (Malimbus racheliae), also known as Rachel's weaver, is a species of bird in the family Ploceidae. It is found in Cameroon, Equatorial Guinea, Gabon, and Nigeria; its habitat is restricted to the lowland forests of the area surrounding the Gulf of Guinea. The species is named for Rachel Cassin Davis (1844–1922), daughter of the ornithologist John Cassin.

The nest is built by three to four birds of which only one is female and which takes the leading role in building the nest. After the nest is finished, one of the males that participated in the building chases off the other participating males. Both of the remaining couple take duty of incubating the eggs.
