= Charopinesta suavis =

Scientific classification
- Kingdom: Animalia
- Phylum: Mollusca
- Class: Gastropoda
- Order: Stylommatophora
- Family: Punctidae
- Genus: Charopinesta
- Species: C. suavis

Binomial name
- Charopinesta suavis (Iredale, 1944)
- Location of Lord Howe Island

Species of land snail

Charopinesta suavis, also known as the sweet pinhead snail, is a species of land snail that is endemic to Australia's Lord Howe Island in the Tasman Sea.

== Description ==
The depressedly turbinate shell of the mature snail is 1.4 mm in height, with a diameter of 2.6 mm, and a low, stepped spire. It is golden amber in colour. The whorls are slightly rounded, with impressed sutures and fine, very closely spaced radial ribs. It has a roundedly lunate aperture and moderately widely open umbilicus.

== Distribution and habitat ==
This extremely rare snail is only been recorded by a single shell collected from the summit of Mount Lidgbird and may be extinct.
