= Paralaoma goweri =

- Lord Howe Island

Scientific classification
- Kingdom: Animalia
- Phylum: Mollusca
- Class: Gastropoda
- Order: Stylommatophora
- Family: Punctidae
- Genus: Paralaoma
- Species: P. goweri

Binomial name
- Paralaoma goweri Iredale, 1944
- Location of Lord Howe Island

Species of land snail

Paralaoma goweri, also known as the mountain pinhead snail, is a species of land snail that is endemic to Australia's Lord Howe Island in the Tasman Sea.

== Description ==
The depressedly turbinate shell of the mature snail is 1.3 mm in height, with a diameter of 1.9 mm, and a raised spire. It is deep golden-brown in colour. The whorls are rounded and tightly coiled, with impressed sutures and moderately spaced radial ribs. It has a roundedly lunate aperture and moderately widely open umbilicus.

== Distribution and habitat ==
This snail is very rare and only found on the summit of Mount Gower.
