= Goweriana =

Scientific classification
- Kingdom: Animalia
- Phylum: Mollusca
- Class: Gastropoda
- Superorder: Eupulmonata
- Order: Stylommatophora
- Family: Punctidae
- Genus: Goweriana; Shea & Griffiths, 2010
- Location of Lord Howe Island

Genus of land snails

Goweriana is a monotypic genus of pinhead or dot snails that is endemic to Australia's Lord Howe Island in the Tasman Sea.

== Species ==
- Goweriana berniceae Shea & Griffiths, 2010 – Bernice's pinhead snail

== Description ==
The shells of this very rare species are fragile and broken easily, making it difficult to find entire adult shells to measure. The globose shell of a subadult had a diameter of 3.5 mm, with a flat spire, and was transparent golden-brown in colour. The sutures are impressed and the whorls rounded, with moderately spaced, bladed radial ribs. The aperture is roundly lunate with a closed umbilicus. The animal is unknown.

== Distribution and habitat ==
The main area of occurrence of the snail is on the upper slopes of Mount Gower, living in rain forest plant litter.
