= Christianoconcha =

Scientific classification
- Kingdom: Animalia
- Phylum: Mollusca
- Class: Gastropoda
- Order: Stylommatophora
- Family: Punctidae
- Genus: Christianoconcha; Iredale, 1945

Genus of gastropods

Christianoconcha is a genus of small air-breathing land snails, terrestrial gastropod mollusks in the family Punctidae, the dot snails.

== Species ==
Species in the genus Christianoconcha include:

- Christianoconcha quintalia
