= Pernastela =

Scientific classification
- Kingdom: Animalia
- Phylum: Mollusca
- Class: Gastropoda
- Superorder: Eupulmonata
- Order: Stylommatophora
- Family: Punctidae
- Genus: Pernastela; Iredale, 1944
- Location of Lord Howe Island

Genus of land snails

Pernastela is a genus of three pinhead or dot snail species that are endemic to Australia's Lord Howe Island in the Tasman Sea.

== Species ==
- Pernastela charon Iredale, 1944 – lowland forest pinhead snail
- Pernastela gnoma Iredale, 1944 – dwarf pinhead snail
- Pernastela howensis Iredale, 1944 – Lord Howe pinhead snail
