= Allenella belli =

Scientific classification
- Domain: Eukaryota
- Kingdom: Animalia
- Phylum: Mollusca
- Class: Gastropoda
- Order: Stylommatophora
- Family: Punctidae
- Genus: Allenella
- Species: A. belli

Binomial name
- Allenella belli (Iredale, 1944)
- Location of Lord Howe Island

Synonyms
- Allenella belli extra Iredale, 1944; Allentula belli (Iredale, 1944)

Species of land snail

Allenella belli, also known as the beautiful pinhead snail, is a species of land snail that is endemic to Australia's Lord Howe Island in the Tasman Sea.

== Description ==
The depressedly turbinate shell of the mature snail is 1.6 mm in height, with a diameter of 2.4 mm, and a low conical spire. It is amber to golden in colour. The whorls are rounded, with impressed sutures and distinct radial ribs. It has an ovately lunate aperture and narrowly open umbilicus.

== Distribution and habitat ==
This rare snail has a distribution limited to the summits and upper slopes of the island's southern mountains. The only live specimens were collected from shrubs and tree trunks.
