= Pernastela charon =

Scientific classification
- Kingdom: Animalia
- Phylum: Mollusca
- Class: Gastropoda
- Order: Stylommatophora
- Family: Punctidae
- Genus: Pernastela
- Species: P. charon

Binomial name
- Pernastela charon Iredale, 1944
- Location of Lord Howe Island

Species of land snail

Pernastela charon, also known as the lowland forest pinhead snail, is a species of land snail that is endemic to Australia's Lord Howe Island in the Tasman Sea.

== Description ==
The trochoidal shell of the mature snail is 2.1–2.5 mm in height, with a diameter of 3.2–3.5 mm, and a raised spire. It is cream to pale golden-brown in colour. The whorls are rounded and flattened below an angular periphery, with moderately spaced radial ribs. It has a roundedly lunate aperture, flattened on the upper side by a reflected lip, and a moderately wide umbilicus.

== Distribution and habitat ==
The snail is commonest in the settlement area of the island's lowlands, inhabiting plant litter in mixed forest.
