= Semilaoma =

Scientific classification
- Domain: Eukaryota
- Kingdom: Animalia
- Phylum: Mollusca
- Class: Gastropoda
- Superorder: Eupulmonata
- Order: Stylommatophora
- Family: Punctidae
- Genus: Semilaoma; Iredale, 1944
- Location of Lord Howe Island

Genus of land snails

Semilaoma is a genus of three pinhead or dot snail species that are endemic to Australia's Lord Howe Island in the Tasman Sea.

== Species ==
- Semilaoma costata Shea & Griffiths, 2010 – coarse-ribbed pinhead snail
- Semilaoma laevis Shea & Griffiths, 2010 – smooth pinhead snail
- Semilaoma lidgbirdensis (Iredale, 1944) – Mount Lidgbird pinhead snail
