= Dignamoconcha =

Scientific classification
- Kingdom: Animalia
- Phylum: Mollusca
- Class: Gastropoda
- Superorder: Eupulmonata
- Order: Stylommatophora
- Family: Punctidae
- Genus: Dignamoconcha; Iredale, 1944
- Location of Lord Howe Island

Genus of land snails

Dignamoconcha is a monotypic genus of pinhead or dot snails that is endemic to Australia's Lord Howe Island in the Tasman Sea.

== Species ==
- Dignamoconcha dulcissima Iredale, 1944 – the pagoda pinhead snail

== Description ==
The trochoidal shell of the mature snail is 3.3 mm in height, with a diameter of 5.7 mm, with a stepped, pagoda-like spire. It is pale golden-brown in colour, with white radial streaks. The whorl profile is flattened above and below a strongly keeled periphery. It has a diamond-shaped aperture and widely open umbilicus. It is the largest known punctid in Australia.

== Distribution and habitat ==
Although the snail is sometimes reported from other sites on the island, its main area of occurrence is on the slopes of the southern mountains, at altitudes of 200–600 m in rainforest, where it is arboreal and found on the undersides of green leaves, especially those of palms.
