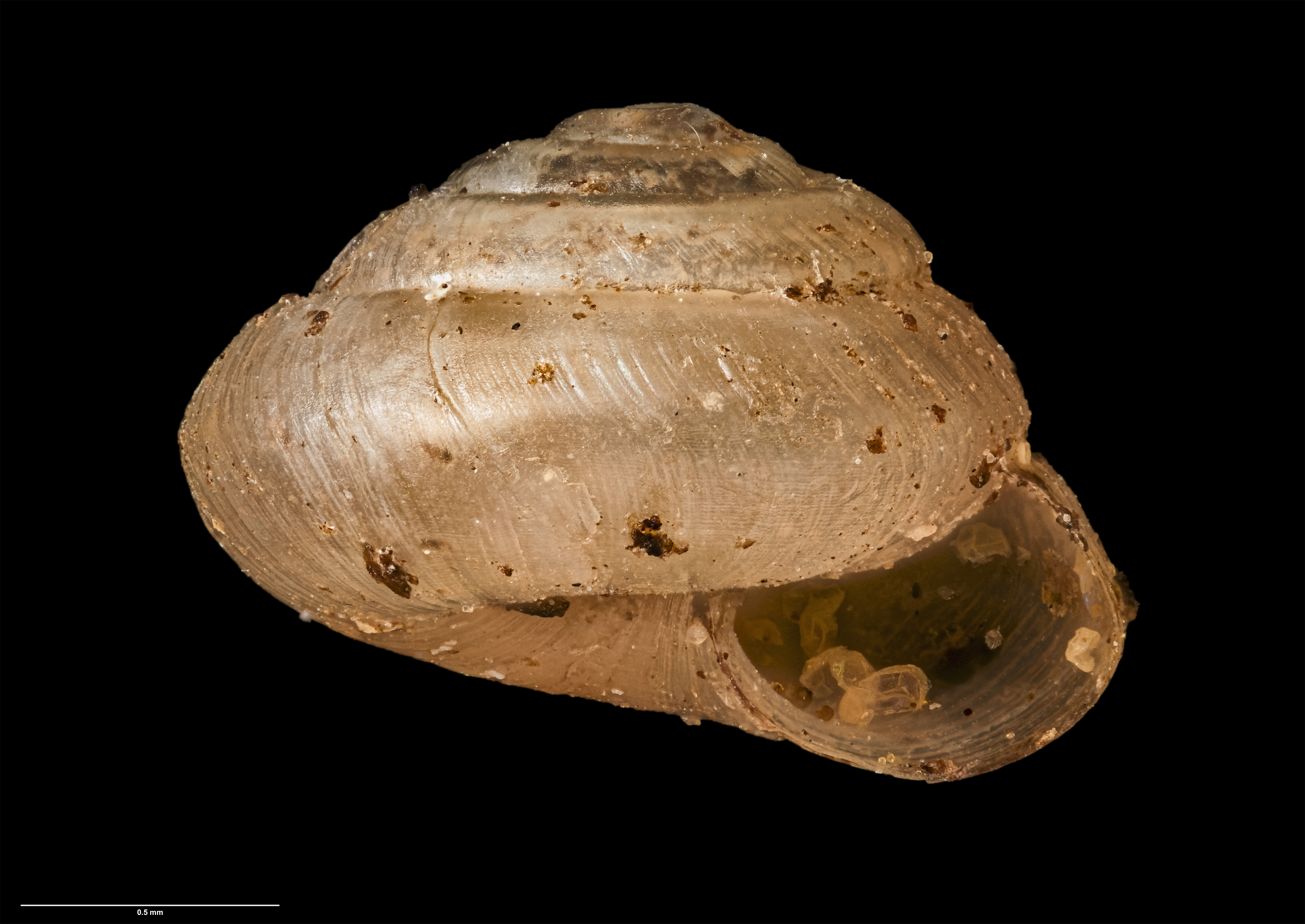
- Holotype

Conservation status
- Naturally Uncommon (NZ TCS)

Scientific classification
- Kingdom: Animalia
- Phylum: Mollusca
- Class: Gastropoda
- Order: Stylommatophora
- Family: Punctidae
- Subfamily: Laominae
- Genus: Kokikora
- Species: K. angulata

Binomial name
- Kokikora angulata Climo & Goulstone, 1995

= Kokikora angulata =

Species of land snail

Kokikora angulata is a species of land snail belonging to the family Punctidae. First described in 1995, the species is endemic to New Zealand.

== Description ==
K. angulata has an angled body whorl and moderately wide umbilicus. The shells are small (typically having a diameter of 1.8 mm (0.071 in), but sometimes up to 2.8 mm (0.11 in)), typically having 4.5 whorls, a depressed turbinate, and are mainly transparent, becoming faintly brown as an adult. The shells have no sculpture, except for irregular growth lines and faint microscopic spirals. The animal has black scratchy marking across the mantle roof, with a yellow white pigment across its visceral coil.

Members of the genus have small shells measuring less than 3 mm (0.12 in), are unicoloured, and either turbinate or depressed turbinate, and distinctly but not sharply angled body whorls. The protoconch is mostly smooth, or has a faint spiral sculpture. The genus has post-nuclear whorls that are either smooth, or have a few growth ridges. The animal has some light black markings, and yellow pigment on its visceral coil. It can be differentiated from K. mimiwhangata due to size differences.

== Taxonomy ==
The species was described by Frank Climo and James Frederick Goulstone in 1995. In the same paper, Climo and Goulstone described the genus and the other known member of Kokiora, designating K. angulata as the type species. The holotype is held by the Auckland War Memorial Museum.

== Habitat ==
K. angulata lives in coastal areas, and rarely in small numbers away from the coast. It is often found in association with epiphytes of remnant trees, often pōhutukawa. Unlike many other coastal land snail species, K. angulata has no preference for limestone. In Auckland, the species is known to occur on the coastal cliffs of Waikōwhai, and small numbers are present in the Auckland Domain, which Climo and Goulstone theorise may have been due to the species remaining in a single location after land reclamations moved the shoreline further north. K. angulata tends to be found in suspended leaf litter.

== Distribution and habitat ==
The species is endemic to New Zealand, primarily occurring in Northland, Auckland, the Coromandel Peninsula, and the islands of the Hauraki Gulf. Most distant populations have been noted in the Tasman District, and the mouth of the Tongapōrutu River in Taranaki.

== Gallery ==
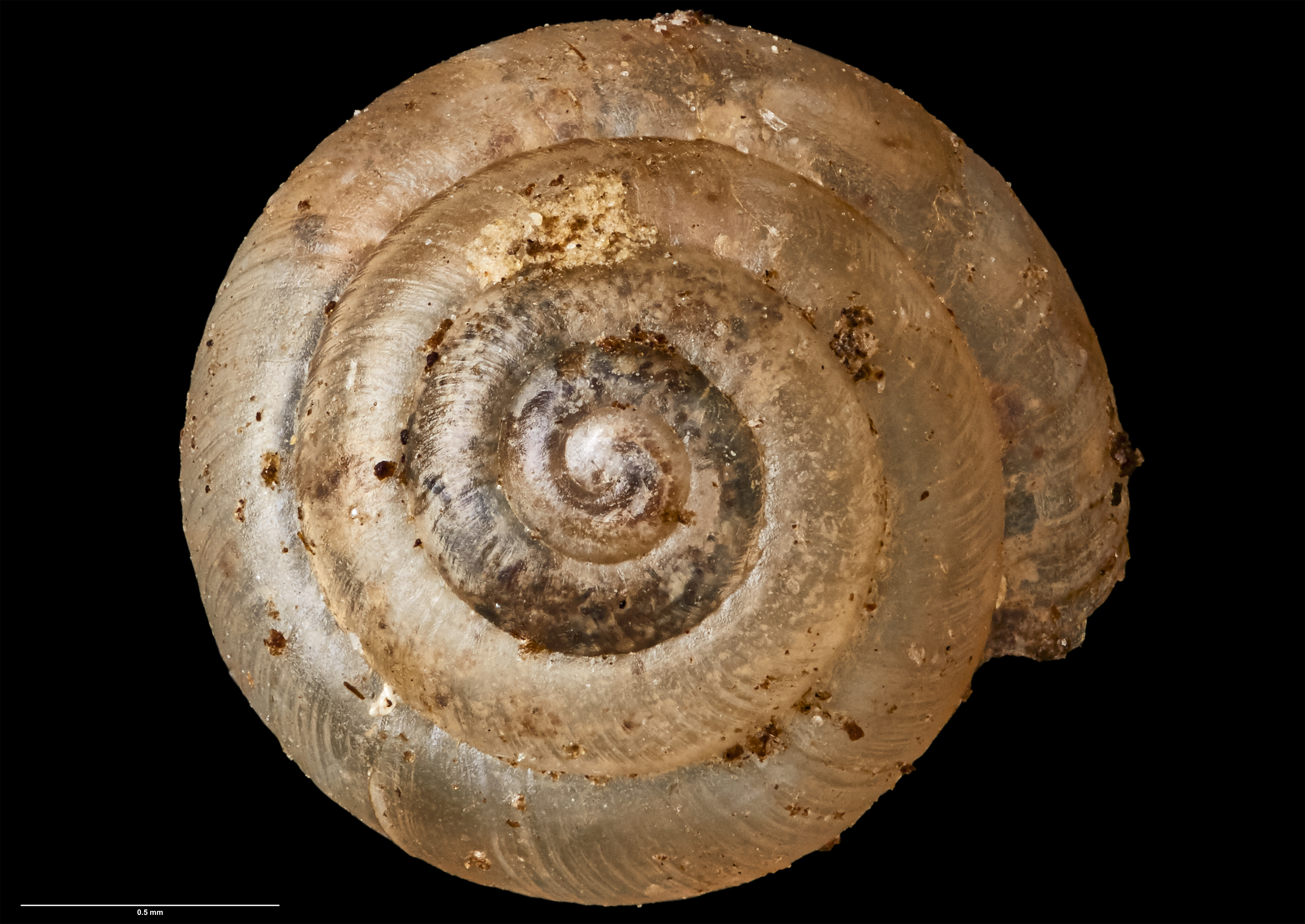
Top-down view of K. angulata holotype

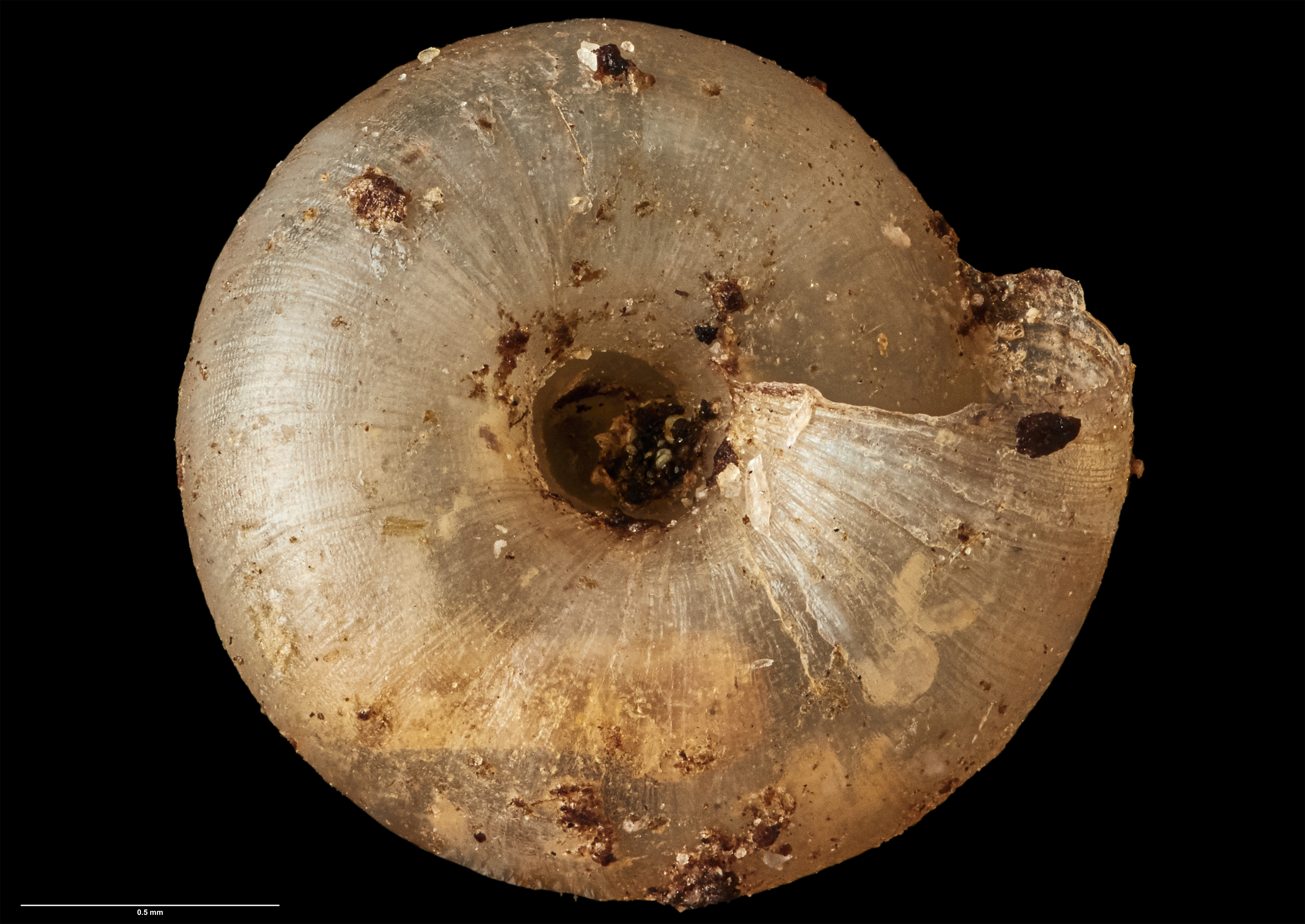
Underside view of K. angulata holotype
