= Pasmaditta =

Scientific classification
- Domain: Eukaryota
- Kingdom: Animalia
- Phylum: Mollusca
- Class: Gastropoda
- Order: Stylommatophora
- Family: Punctidae
- Genus: Pasmaditta; Kershaw & B.J. Smith, 1986

Genus of gastropods

Pasmaditta is a genus of gastropods in the family Punctidae, the dot snails.

== Species ==
Species within the genus Pasmaditta include:

- Pasmaditta jungermanniae
