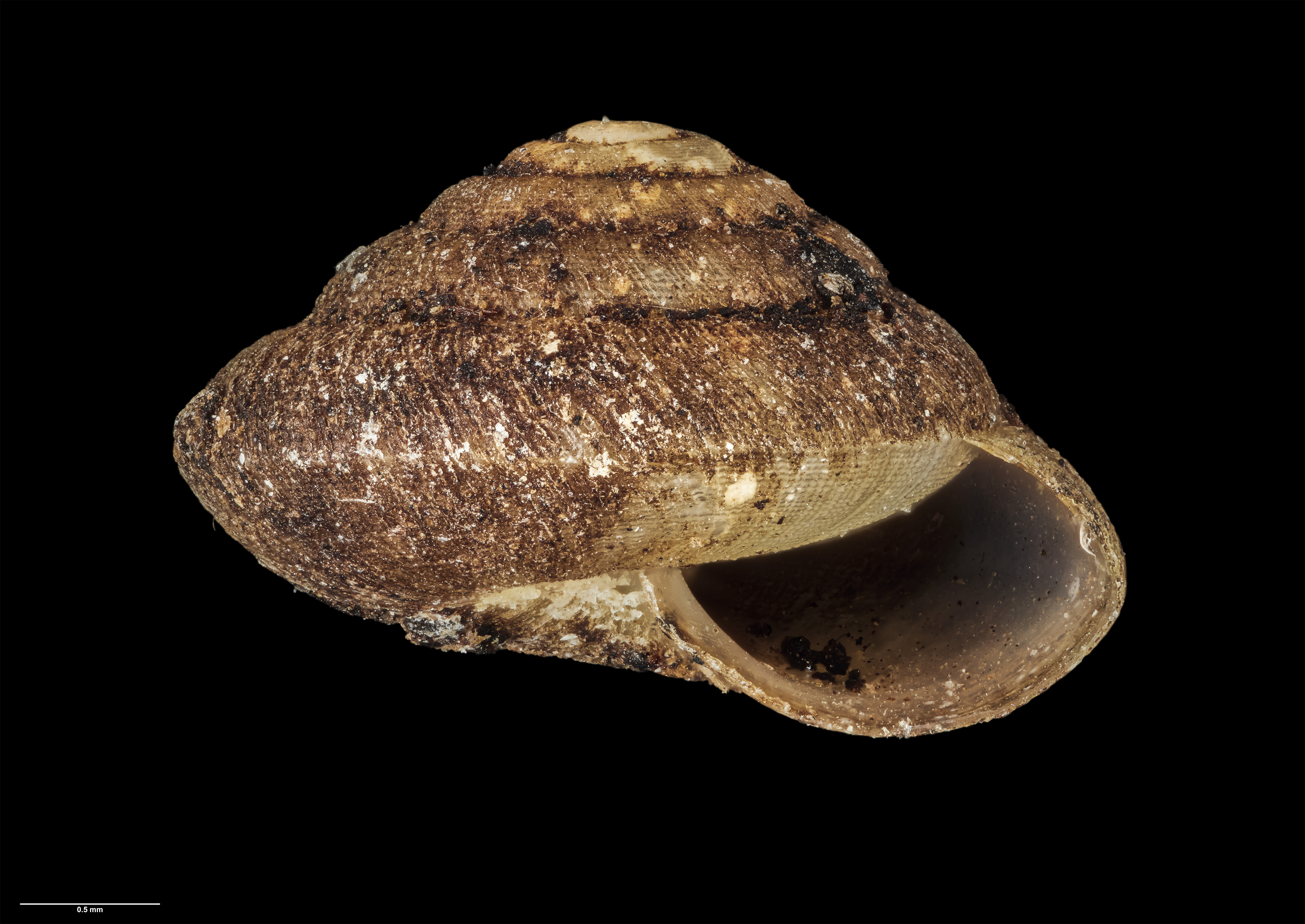
- Holotype of L. sericea

Scientific classification
- Kingdom: Animalia
- Phylum: Mollusca
- Class: Gastropoda
- Order: Stylommatophora
- Family: Punctidae
- Subfamily: Laominae
- Genus: Laomarex; A. W. B. Powell, 1948

Type species
- L. sericea

= Laomarex =

Genus of gastropods

Laomarex is a genus of land snails belonging to the family Punctidae. All known members of the genus are endemic to New Zealand.

== Description ==
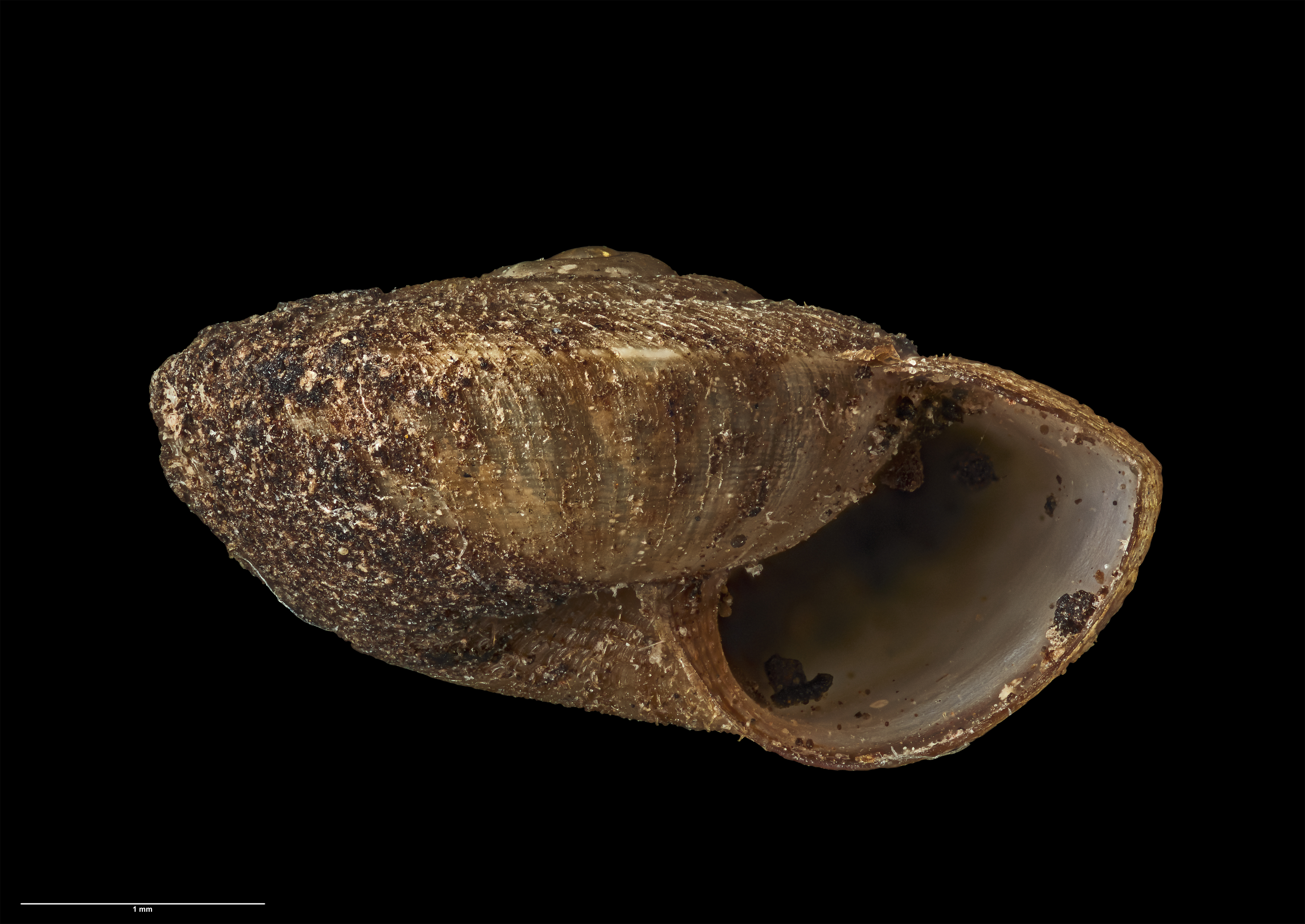
Holotype of L. regia

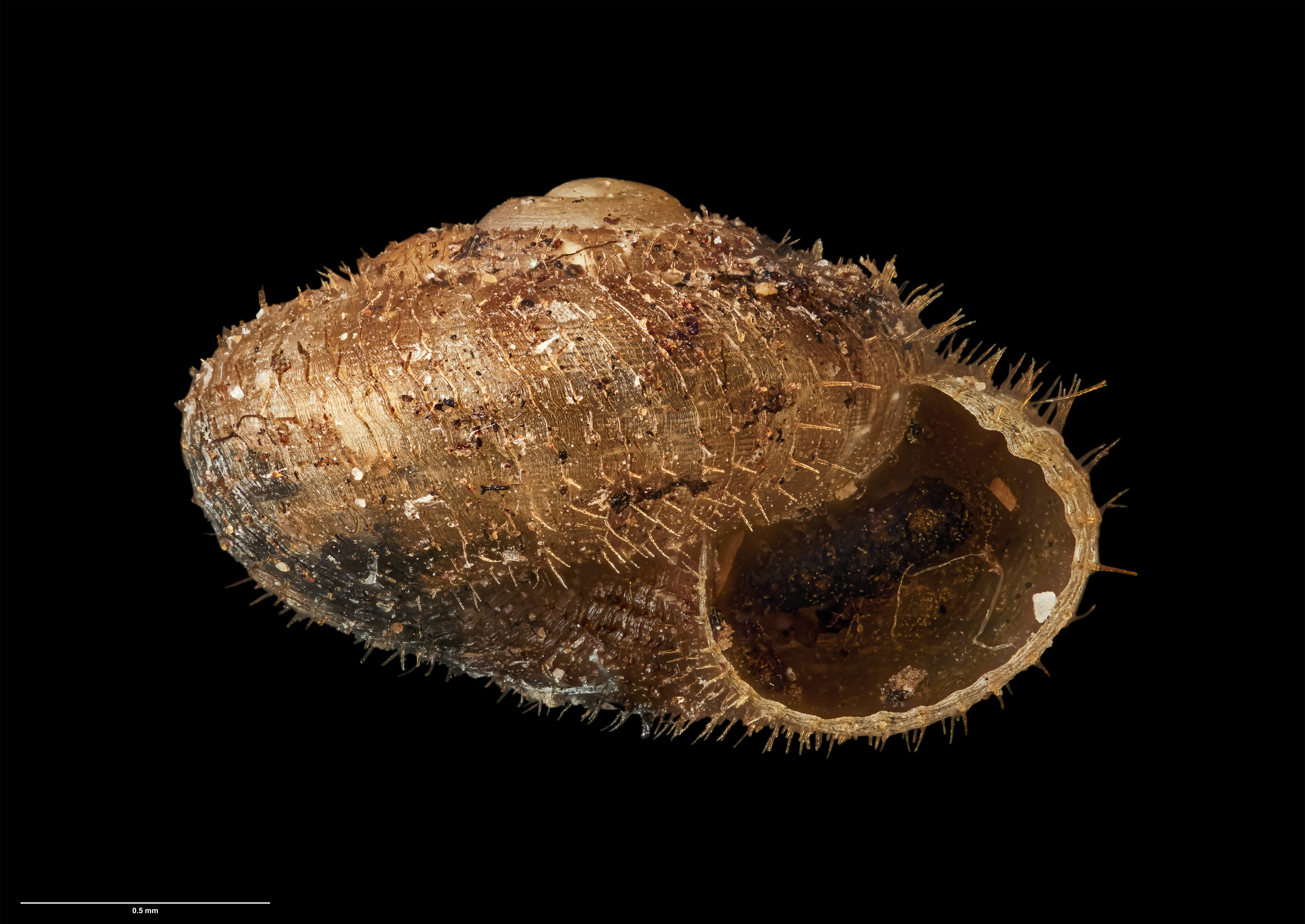
Holotype of L. minuta

In the original description, Powell described the genus as below:

This genus is provided for a species which, although it resembles Phrixgnathus in form, lacks the translucent texture of that genus. It has the addition of dense membranous radials reminiscent of Therasiella and a strongly sculptured protoconch of beaded spirals. At first appearance the genus appears to be Therasiella, particularly on account of the dark brown membranous radials, but the protoconch is low and sculptured, not exsert, and smooth or practically smooth. The presence of an underlying radiate colour pattern is another feature foreign to Therasiella but common to the Laomidae.

The genus can be identified due to the lack of peripheral lamellate processes, and by its delicate bristles at the intersection of the shell's radial and spiral sculpture.

== Taxonomy ==
The genus was first described by A. W. B. Powell in 1948, who named L. sericea as the type species. The genus was monotypic until 1973, when Frank Climo moved the species' Thalassohelix regia and Thalassohelix minuta into this genus. The holotypes of all three known species are held by the Auckland War Memorial Museum.

== Distribution ==
Both L. regia and L. sericea are endemic to Manawatāwhi / Three Kings Islands, and L. minuta is endemic to the Aupōuri Peninsula of Northland, New Zealand, with its type locality being Tapotupotu Bay.

== Species ==
Species within the genus Laomarex include:

- Laomarex minuta (N. W. Gardner, 1967)
- Laomarex regia (N. W. Gardner, 1968)
- Laomarex sericea A. W. B. Powell, 1948
