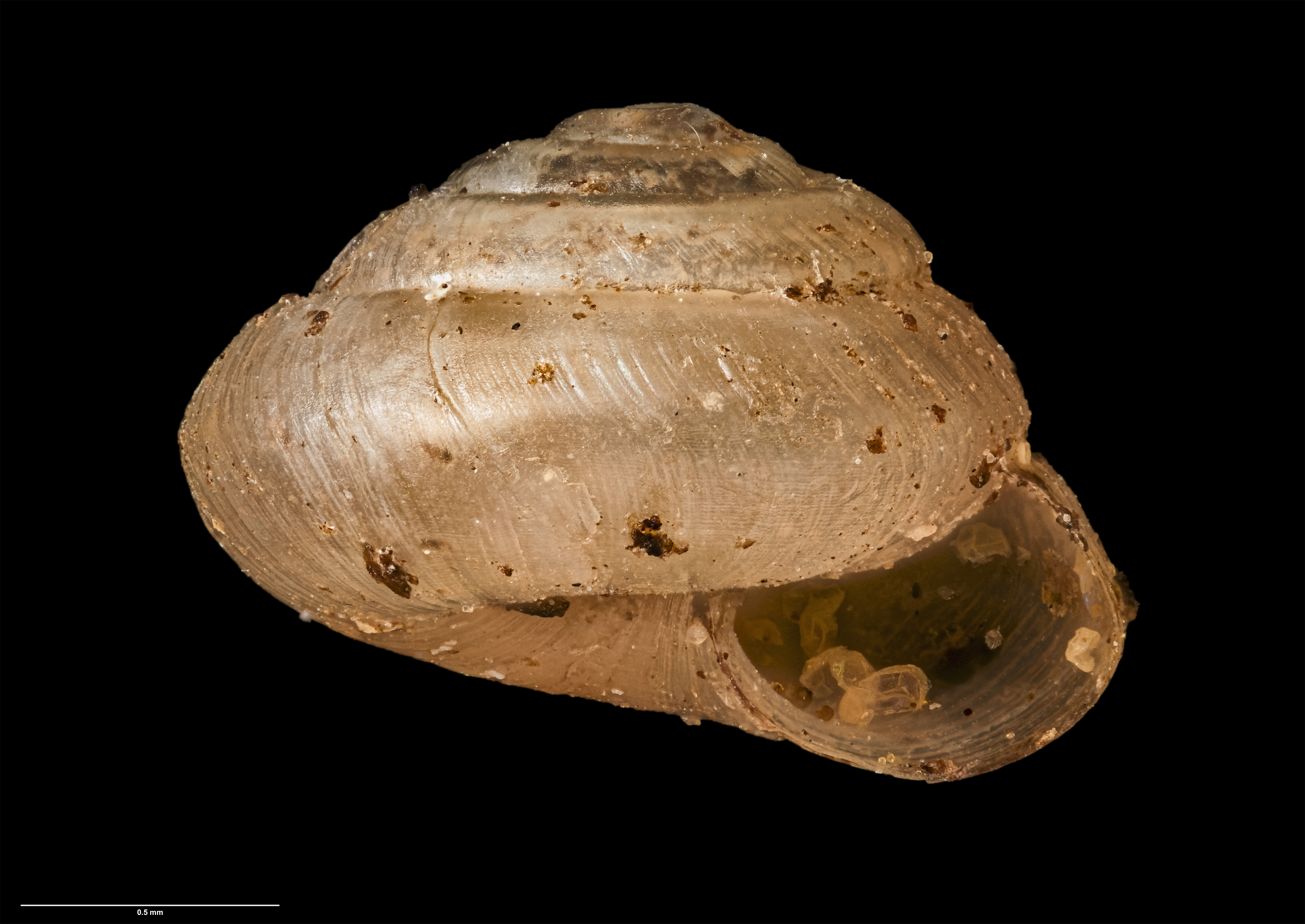
- Holotype of K. angulata

Scientific classification
- Kingdom: Animalia
- Phylum: Mollusca
- Class: Gastropoda
- Order: Stylommatophora
- Family: Punctidae
- Subfamily: Laominae
- Genus: Kokikora; Climo & Goulstone, 1995

Type species
- K. angulata

= Kokikora =

Genus of land snail

Kokikora is a genus of land snails belonging to the family Punctidae. First described in 1995, both known members of the genus are endemic to New Zealand.

== Description ==
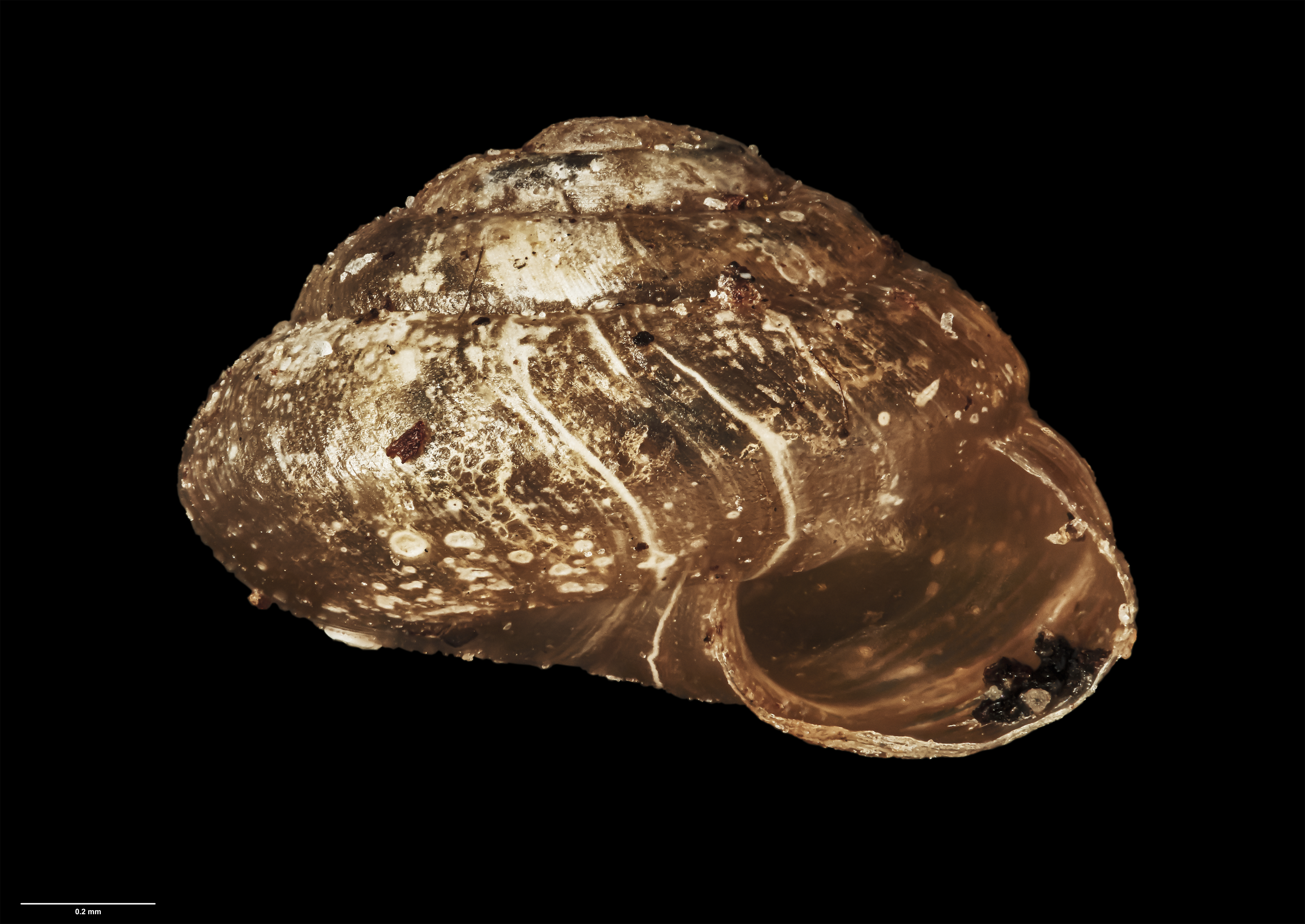
Holotype of K. mimiwhangata

Members of the genus have small shells measuring less than 3 mm (0.12 in), are unicoloured, and either turbinate or depressed turbinate, and distinctly but not sharply angled body whorls. The protoconch is mostly smooth, or has a faint spiral sculpture. The genus has post-nuclear whorls that are either smooth, or have a few growth ridges. The animal has some light black markings, and yellow pigment on its visceral coil.

== Taxonomy ==
The genus was described by Frank Climo and James Frederick Goulstone in 1995. In the same paper, Climo and Goulstone described the two known members of the genus, designating K. angulata as the type species. The genus name is a combination of the Māori language words for bent and fragment. The holotypes of both known species are held by the Auckland War Memorial Museum.

== Distribution and habitat ==
The genus is endemic to New Zealand, with K. angulata found in the northern Tasman District and the North Island in the Auckland Region and Northland Region. K. mimiwhangata has a restricted range, known to occur between the eastern Bay of Islands and Deep Water Cove in Northland.

Members of the genus are typically found in coastal areas, associated with old growth trees including pōhutukawa and nīkau, often near epiphytes growing on these trees. K. angulata tends to be found in suspended leaf litter.

== Species ==
Species within the genus Kokikora include:

- Kokikora angulata Climo & Goulstone, 1995
- Kokikora mimiwhangata Climo & Goulstone, 1995

== Gallery ==
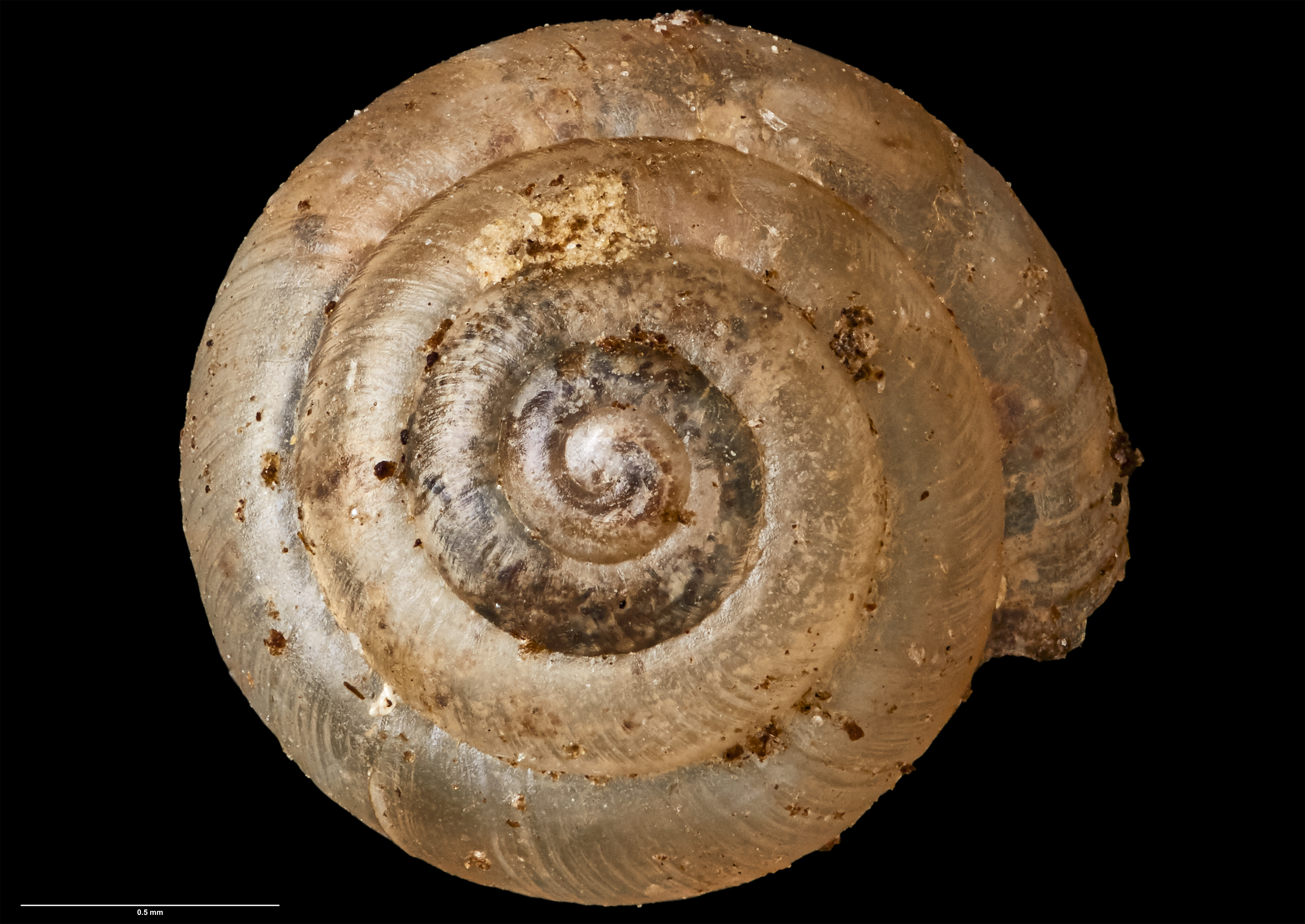
Top-down view of K. angulata holotype

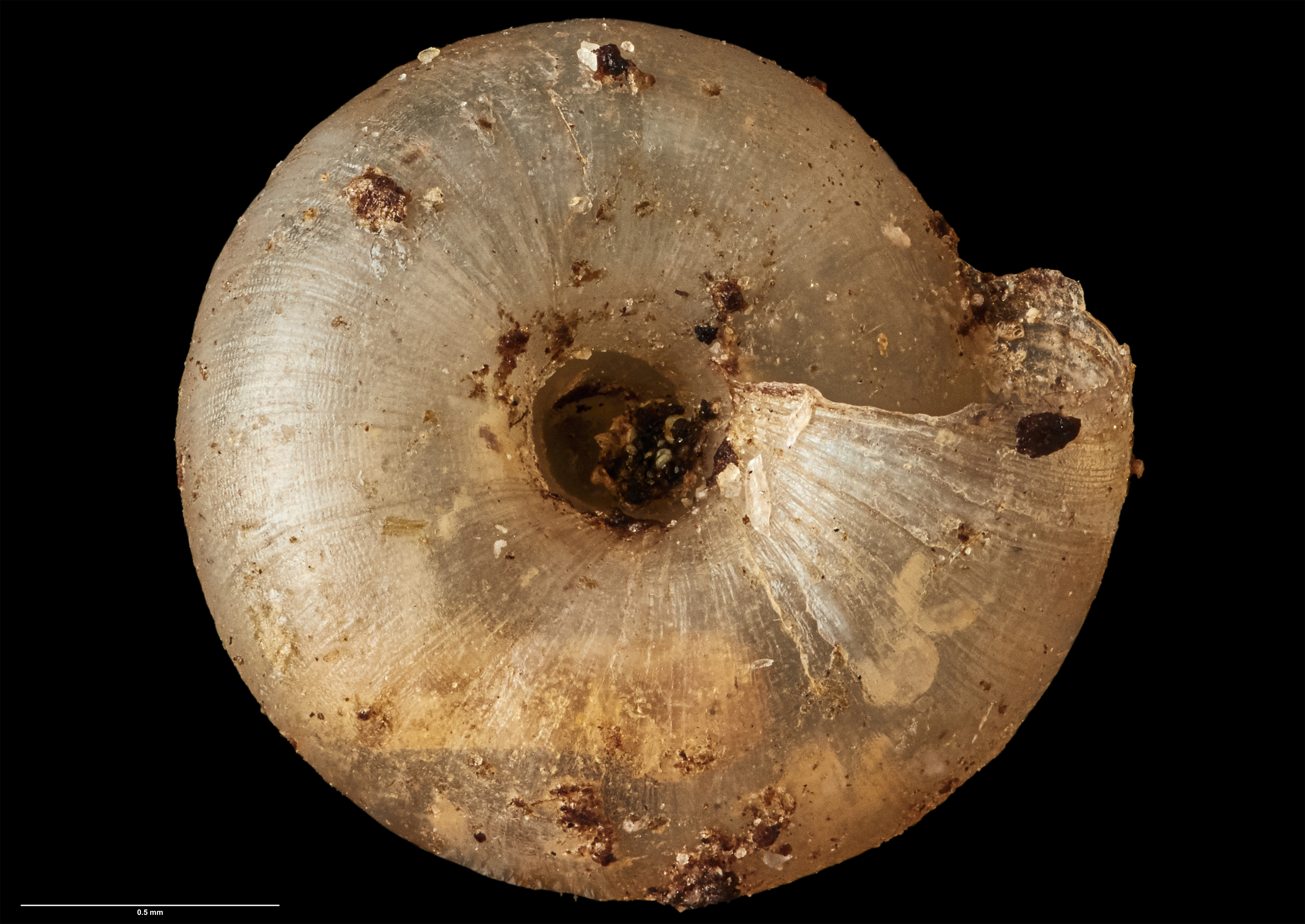
Underside view of K. angulata holotype

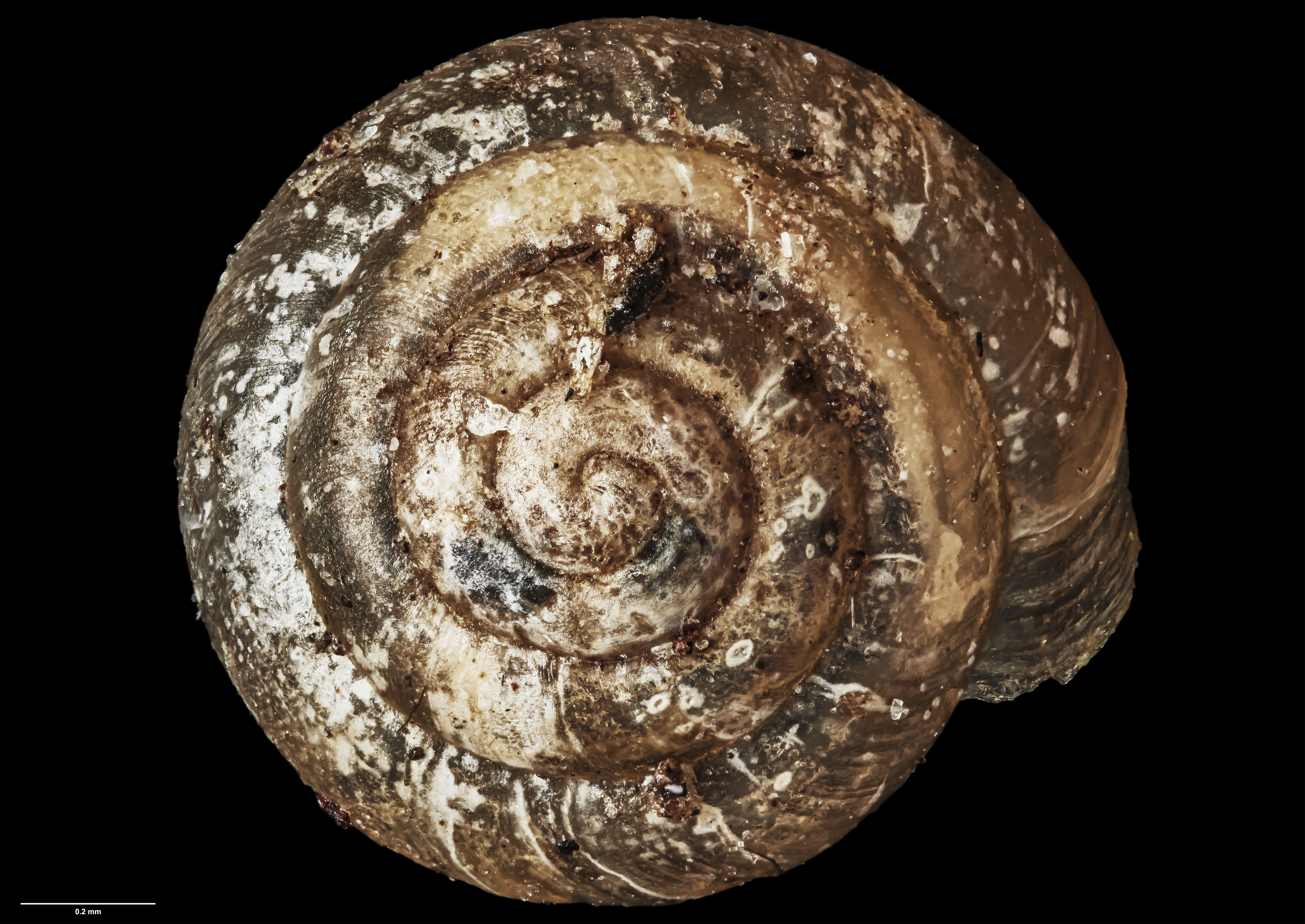
Top-down view of K. mimiwhangata holotype

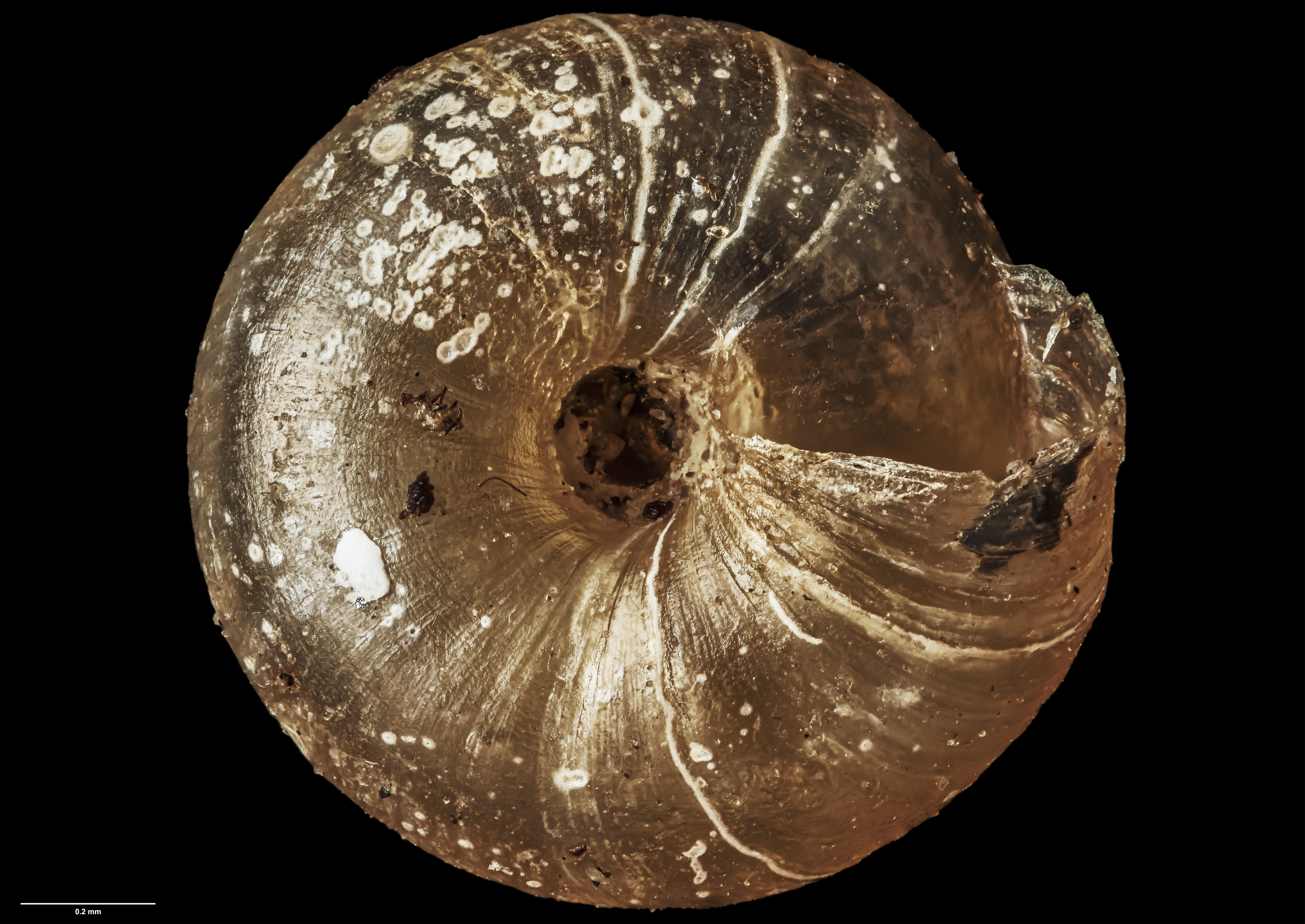
Underside view of K. mimiwhangata holotype
