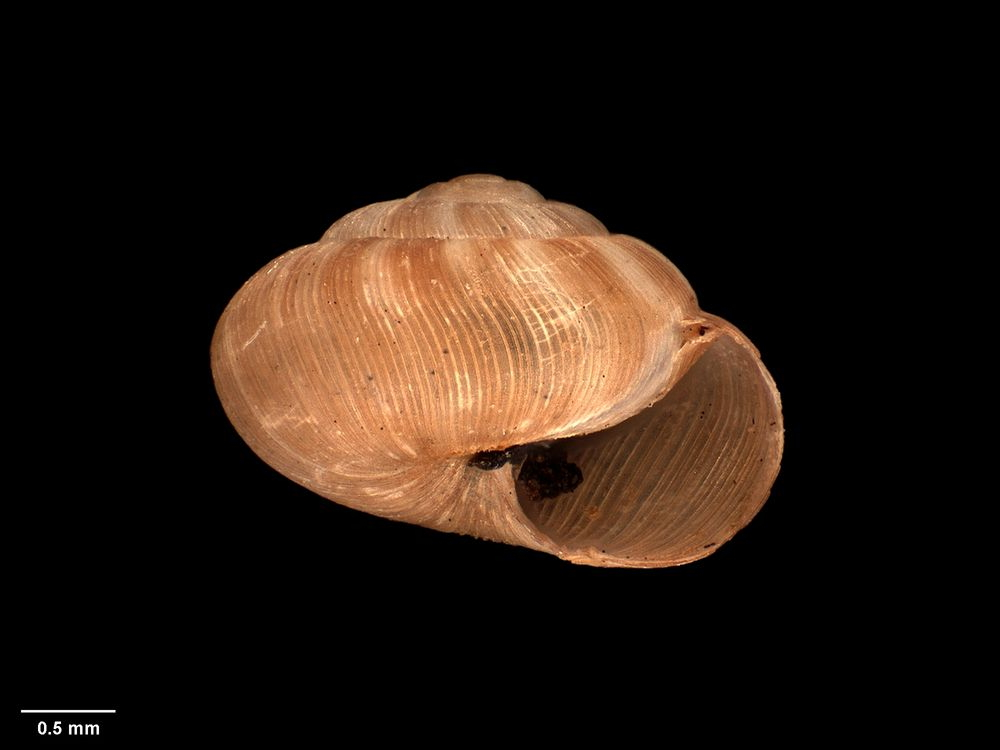
- Shell of Taguahelix subantarctica (specimen at Museum of New Zealand Te Papa Tongarewa)

Scientific classification
- Kingdom: Animalia
- Phylum: Mollusca
- Class: Gastropoda
- Superorder: Eupulmonata
- Order: Stylommatophora
- Family: Punctidae
- Genus: Taguahelix; A. W. B. Powell, 1955

Type species
- Thermia expeditionis Suter, 1909

Synonyms
- Laoma (Taguahelix) A. W. B. Powell, 1955; Phrixgnathus (Taguahelix) A. W. B. Powell, 1955

= Taguahelix =

Genus of land snails

Taguahelix is a genus of terrestrial snails belonging to the subfamily Laominae of the family Punctidae.

== Species ==
- Taguahelix antipodensis (A. W. B. Powell, 1955)
- Taguahelix campbellica (Filhol, 1880)
- Taguahelix crispata Climo & Goulstone, 1993
- Taguahelix delicatula (A. W. B. Powell, 1955)
- Taguahelix elaiodes (W. H. Webster, 1904)
- Taguahelix francesci (W. H. Webster, 1904)
- Taguahelix hirsuta (A. W. B. Powell, 1955)
- Taguahelix subantarctica (Suter, 1909)
