= Semilaoma lidgbirdensis =

Scientific classification
- Domain: Eukaryota
- Kingdom: Animalia
- Phylum: Mollusca
- Class: Gastropoda
- Order: Stylommatophora
- Family: Punctidae
- Genus: Semilaoma
- Species: S. lidgbirdensis

Binomial name
- Semilaoma lidgbirdensis (Iredale, 1944)
- Location of Lord Howe Island

Synonyms
- Paralaoma lidgbirdensis Iredale, 1944; Semilaoma abjecta (Iredale, 1944)

Species of land snail

Semilaoma lidgbirdensis, also known as the Mount Lidgbird pinhead snail, is a tiny species of land snail that is endemic to Australia's Lord Howe Island in the Tasman Sea.

== Description ==
The depressedly turbinate shell of the mature snail is 0.8–0.9 mm in height, with a diameter of 1.5–1.6 mm, and a low spire. It is pale golden in colour. The whorls are rounded above and below an angular periphery. The sutures are weakly impressed, with closely spaced, sinuate radial ribs. It has an ovately lunate aperture, and a very narrow, sometimes closed, umbilicus. The animal is unknown.

== Distribution and habitat ==
The snail is common and widespread across the island in lowland forest, rainforest and scrub.
