= Allenella =

Scientific classification
- Domain: Eukaryota
- Kingdom: Animalia
- Phylum: Mollusca
- Class: Gastropoda
- Superorder: Eupulmonata
- Order: Stylommatophora
- Family: Punctidae
- Genus: Allenella; Iredale, 1944
- Location of Lord Howe Island

Synonyms
- Allentula Iredale, 1958

Genus of land snails

Allenella is a genus of three species of tiny pinhead or dot snails that are endemic to Australia's Lord Howe Island in the Tasman Sea. The genus was first described in 1944 by Tom Iredale.

== Species ==
- Allenella belli Iredale, 1944 – beautiful pinhead snail
- Allenella formalis Iredale, 1944 – brown turban pinhead snail
- Allenella planorum Iredale, 1944 – angular pinhead snail
