= Charopinesta =

Scientific classification
- Kingdom: Animalia
- Phylum: Mollusca
- Class: Gastropoda
- Superorder: Eupulmonata
- Order: Stylommatophora
- Family: Punctidae
- Genus: Charopinesta; Iredale, 1944
- Location of Lord Howe Island

Genus of land snails

Charopinesta is a genus of three species of tiny pinhead or dot snails that are endemic to Australia's Lord Howe Island in the Tasman Sea.

== Species ==
- Charopinesta goweri Iredale, 1944 – Mount Gower pinhead snail
- Charopinesta sema Iredale, 1944 – Blackburn Island pinhead snail
- Charopinesta suavis Iredale, 1944 – sweet pinhead snail
