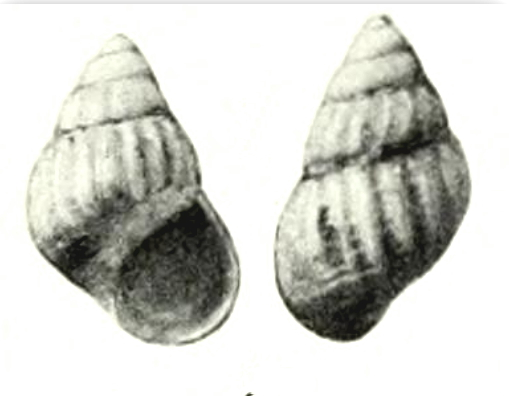
- Shell of Alvania belli (holotype)

Scientific classification
- Kingdom: Animalia
- Phylum: Mollusca
- Class: Gastropoda
- Subclass: Caenogastropoda
- Order: Littorinimorpha
- Superfamily: Rissooidea
- Family: Rissoidae
- Genus: Alvania
- Species: †A. belli

Binomial name
- †Alvania belli Harmer, 1920

= Alvania belli =

Species of gastropod

Alvania belli is an extinct species of minute sea snail, a marine gastropod mollusc or micromollusk in the family Rissoidae.

== Description ==
The length of the shell attains 2.5 mm, its diameter 1 mm.

(Original description) The minute, solid shell is ovate-conical. It contains 5 whorls. The body whorl is ventricose, much the largest, and measures three-fourths the total length. The whorls are obtusely angulate at the periphery and contracted below it. They are ornamented by strong and prominent longitudinal ribs, which terminate suddenly on the body whorl and are replaced by well-marked spiral ridges with fairly wide interspaces. They also show exceedingly fine striae on the upper part of the shell. The spire is short and rapidly diminishes upwards towards a blunt and truncated protoconch. The suture is well marked and somewhat channelled. The aperture is large in proportion, expanded, angulate above and rounded below. The outer lip is thin. The lower part of the inner lip is reflected on the columella, which is nearly straight.

== Distribution ==
Fossils of this species were found in late Pliocene strata in St. Erth, Cornwall, Great Britain.
