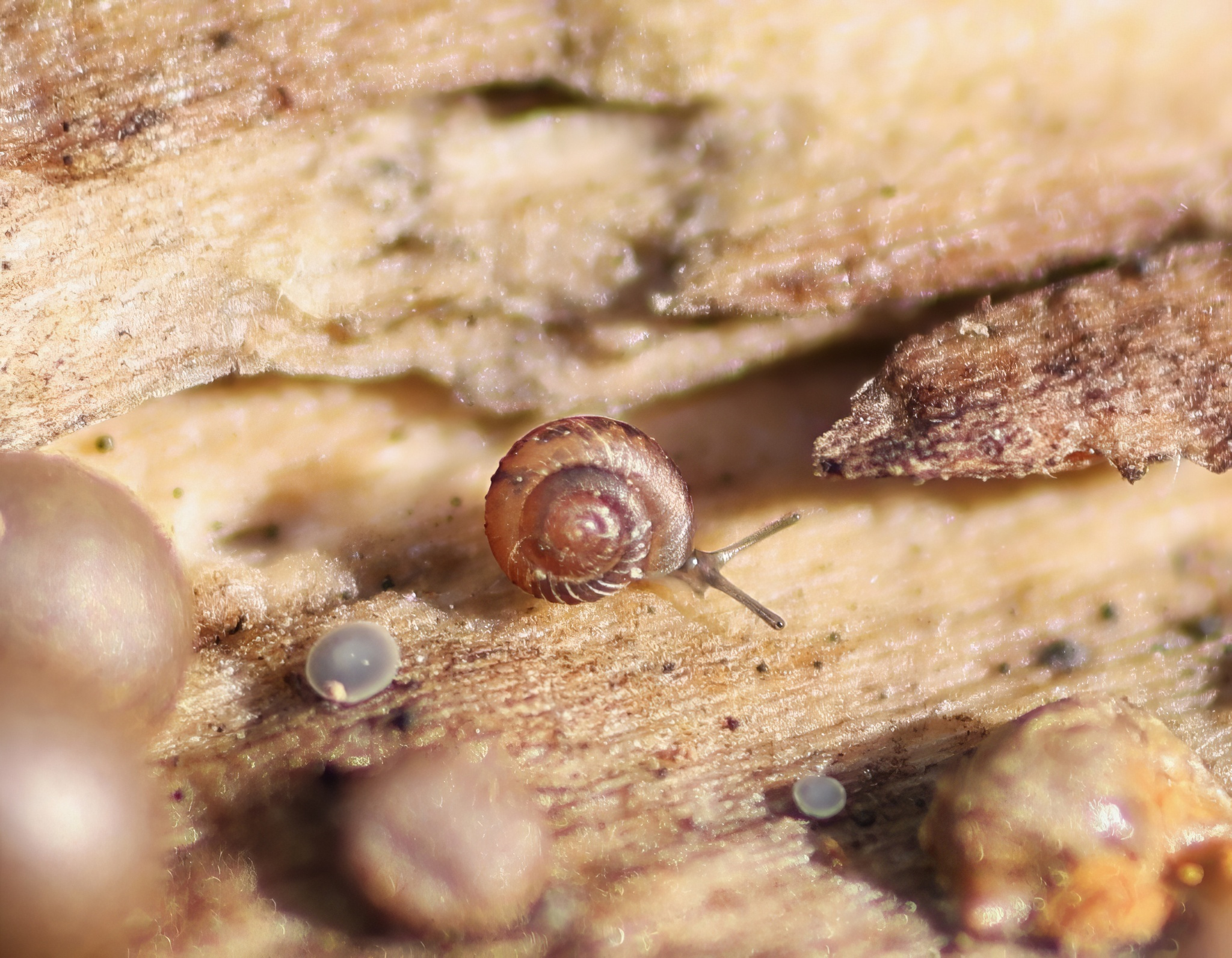
- A live individual of Paralaoma servilis
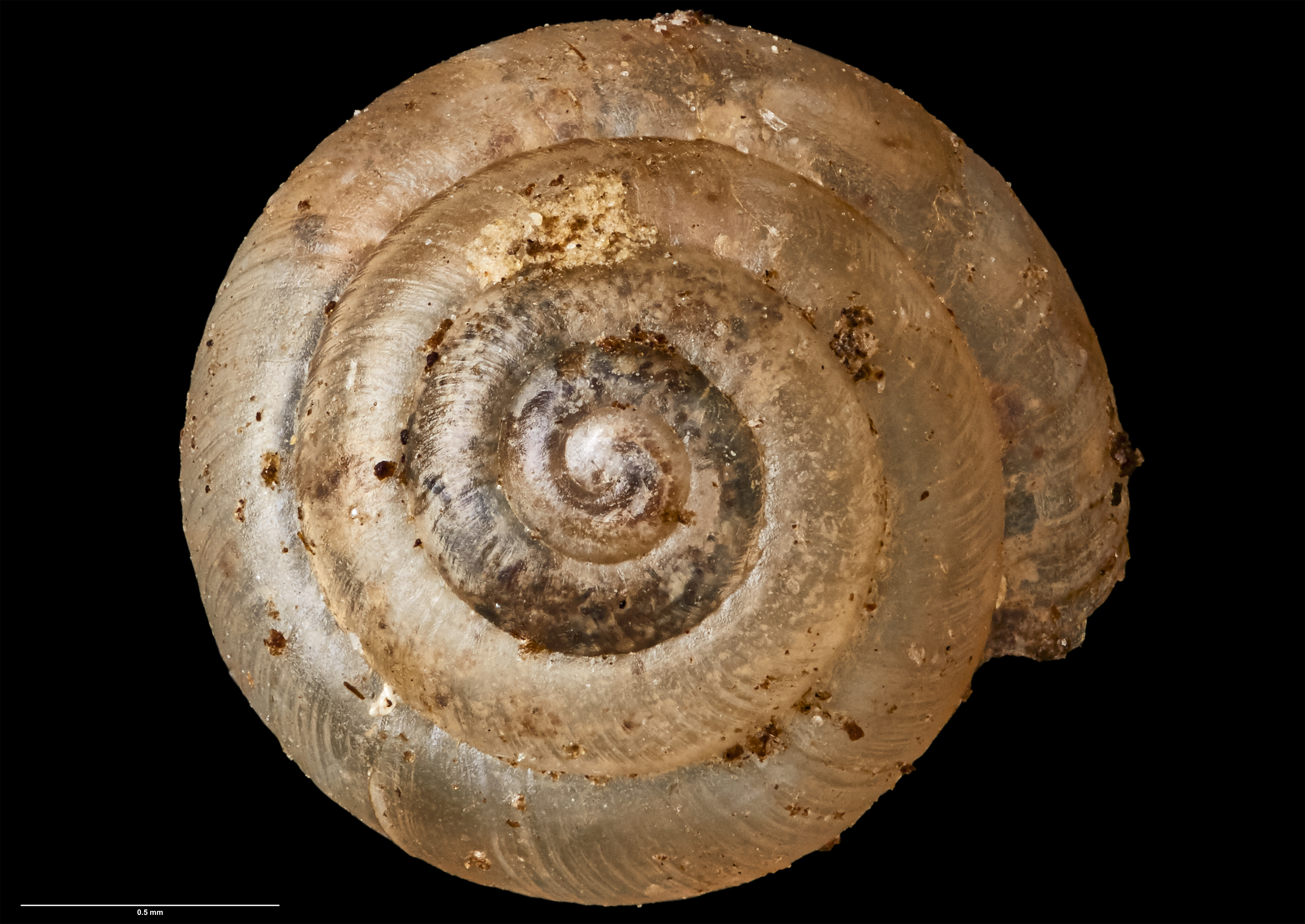
- Apical view of a shell of Kokikora angulata

Scientific classification
- Kingdom: Animalia
- Phylum: Mollusca
- Class: Gastropoda
- Order: Stylommatophora
- Family: Punctidae; Morse, 1864

Genera
- See text

Synonyms
- Laomidae; Paralaomidae; Patulastridae

= Punctidae =

Family of gastropods

Punctidae, common name the "dot snails" or "pinhead snails", is a family of small air-breathing land snails, terrestrial pulmonate gastropod mollusks or micromollusks in the informal group Sigmurethra (according to the taxonomy of the Gastropoda by Bouchet & Rocroi, 2005).

== Genera ==
The family Punctidae includes the following genera:

- Subfamily Laominae Suter, 1913
  - Allenella Iredale, 1944
  - Charopinesta Iredale, 1944
  - Christianoconcha Iredale, 1945
  - Dignamoconcha Iredale, 1944
  - Goweriana Shea & Griffiths, 2010
  - Gratilaoma Iredale, 1939
  - Iotula Iredale, 1941
  - Kaputaresta J. Stanisic, 2010
  - Kokikora Climo & Goulstone, 1995
  - Kokopapa Climo & Mahlfeld, 2012
  - Laoma Gray, 1850
  - Laomarex A. W. B. Powell, 1948
  - Laomavix Iredale, 1933
  - Laomopa Iredale, 1945
  - Magilaoma Iredale, 1937
  - Miselaoma Iredale, 1933
  - Obanella Dell, 1952
  - Paralaoma Iredale, 1913
  - Pasmaditta Kershaw & B. J. Smith, 1986
  - Pedicamista Kershaw & B. J. Smith, 1986
  - Pernastela Iredale, 1944
  - Phrixgnathus Hutton, 1882
  - Pichikadi Vargas-Almonacid & Stuardo, 2007
  - Pseudiotula J. Stanisic, 2010
  - Semilaoma Iredale, 1944
  - Servanda Houston, 2008
  - Taguahelix A. W. B. Powell, 1955
  - Tescilaoma J. Stanisic, 2018
  - Trocholaoma Iredale, 1937
  - Turbolaoma Iredale, 1937
  - Westralaoma Iredale, 1939
- Subfamily Punctinae E. S. Morse, 1864
  - Punctum Morse, 1864
- Genus †Atactolaoma B. A. Marshall & Worthy, 2017

Synonyms

- Allentula Iredale, 1958: synonym of Allenella Iredale, 1944 (unnecessary substitute name for Alenella Iredale, 1944)
- Paraloma Iredale, 1913: synonym of Paralaoma Iredale, 1913 (incorrect subsequent spelling)
- Pleuropunctum Germain, 1928: synonym of Paralaoma Iredale, 1913
- Toltecia Pilsbry, 1926: synonym of Paralaoma Iredale, 1913

== Gallery ==
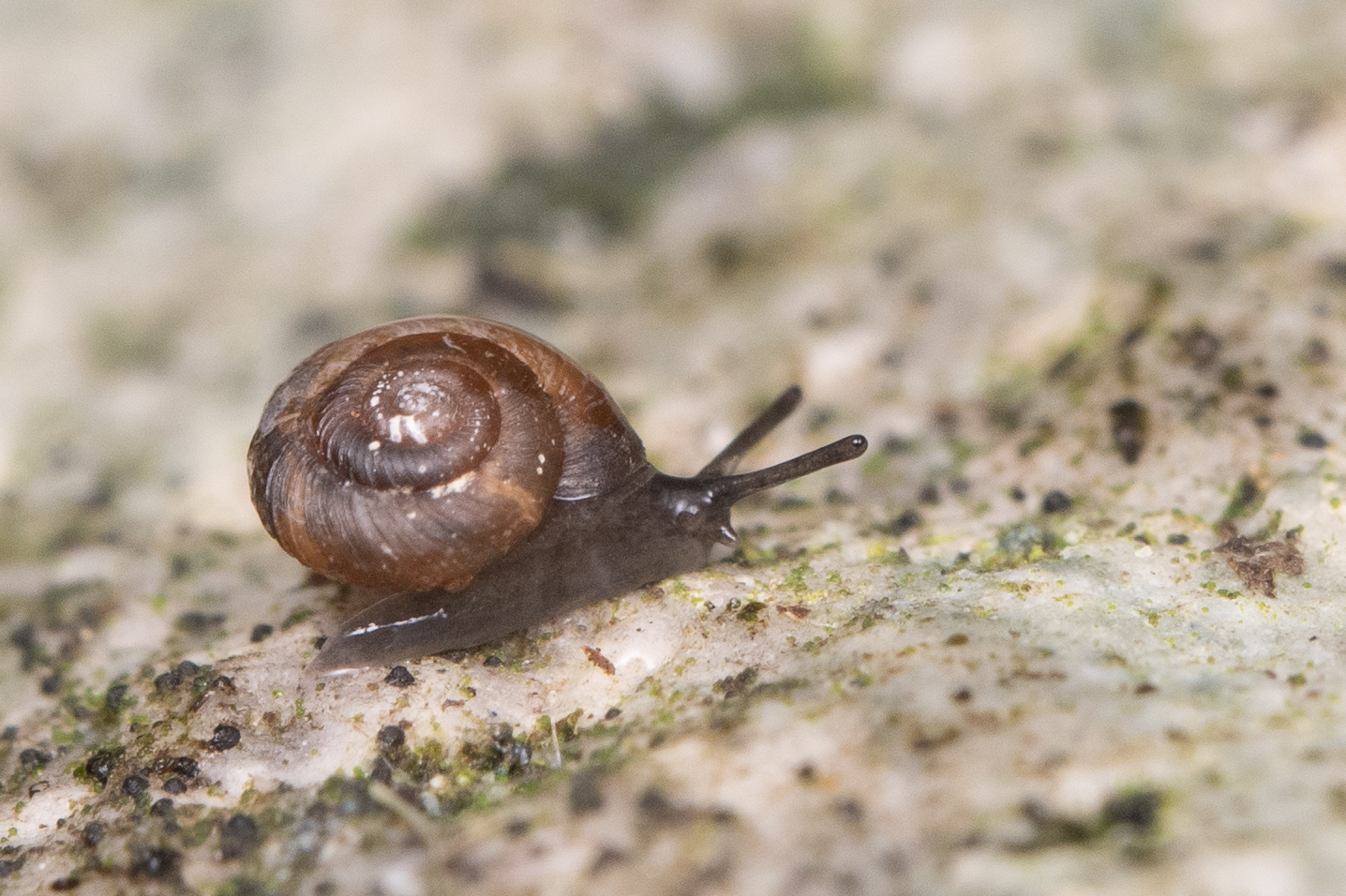
Paralaoma servilis

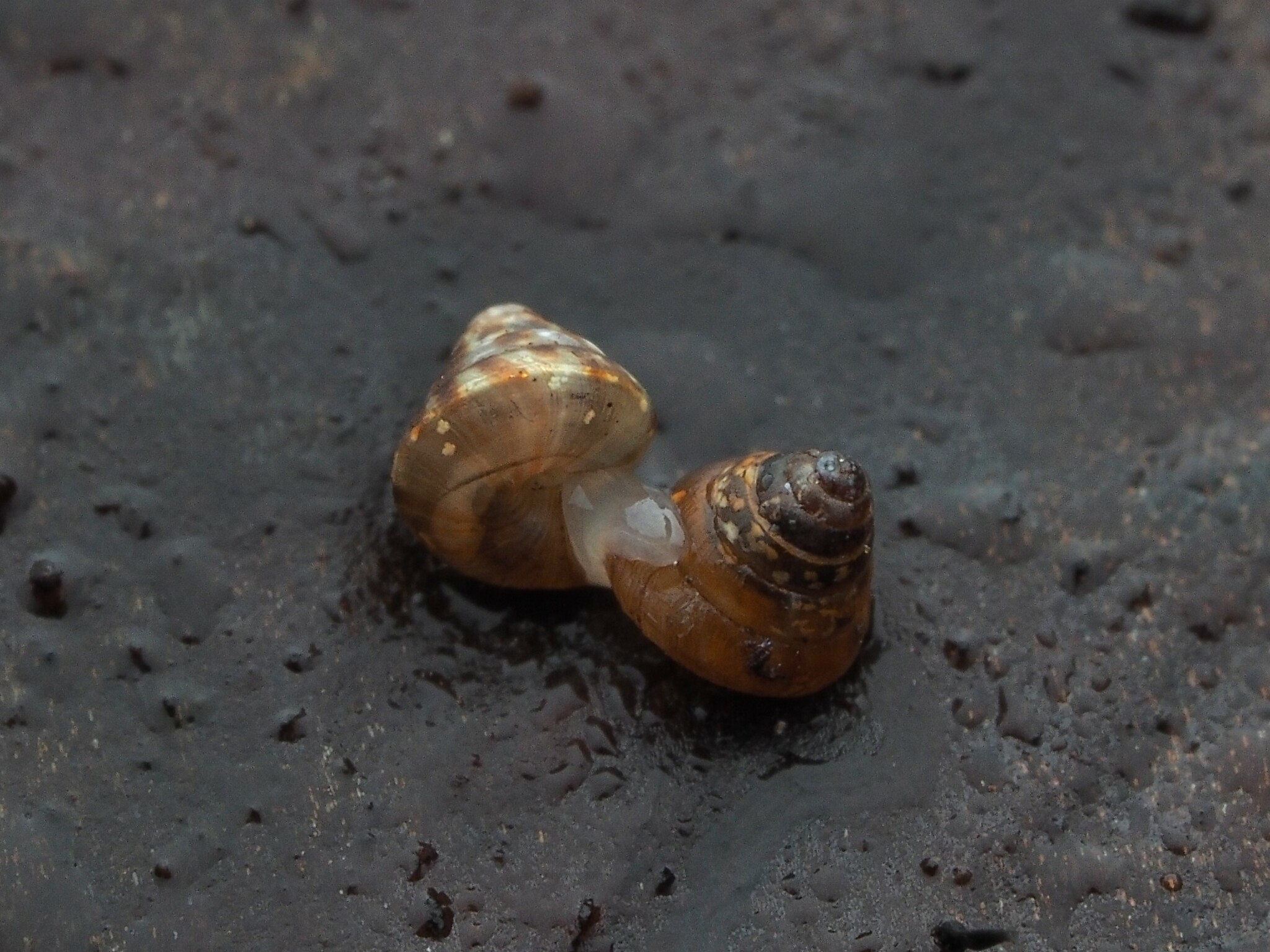
Two Phrixgnathus erigone mating

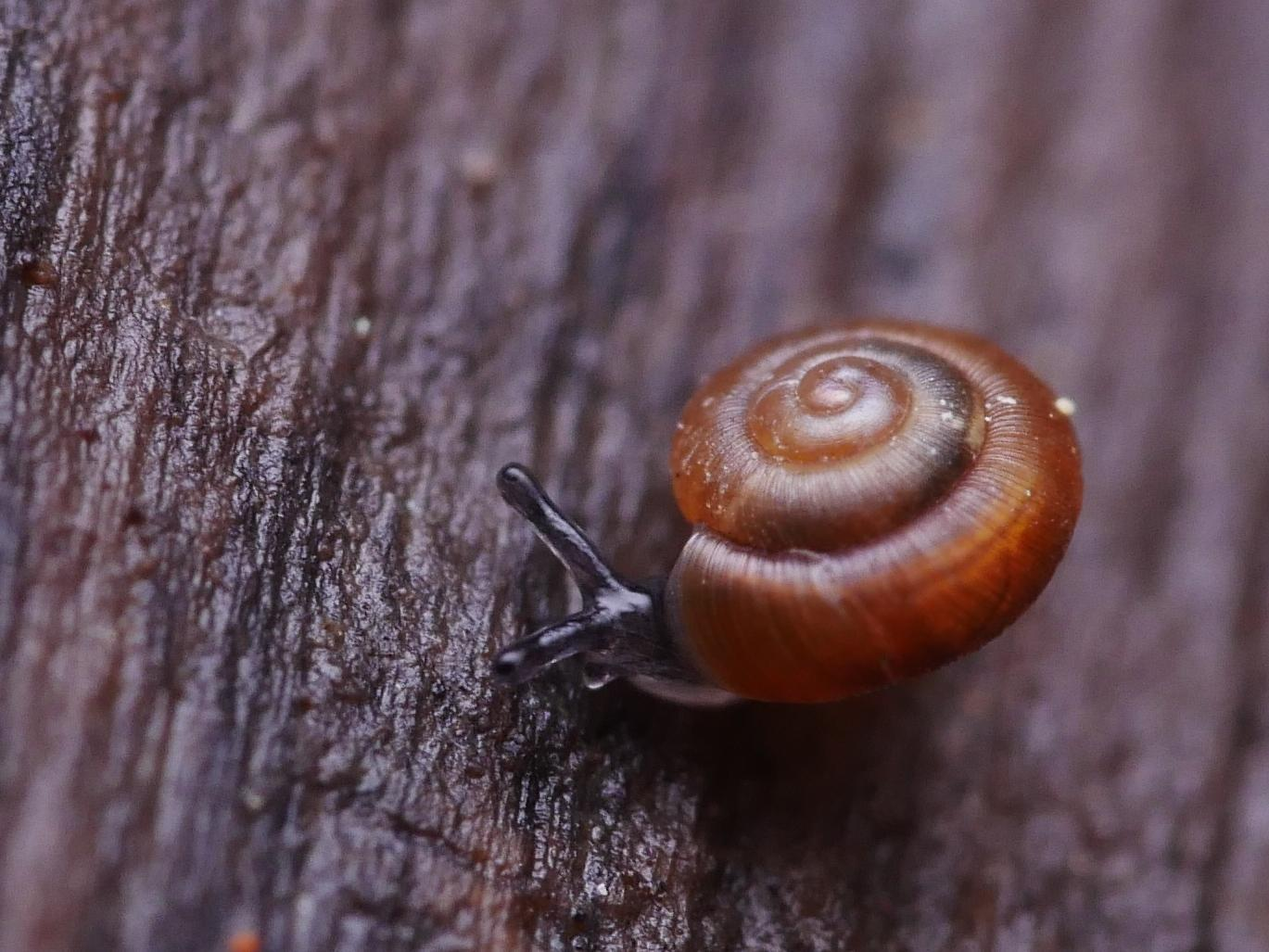
Punctum pygmaeum

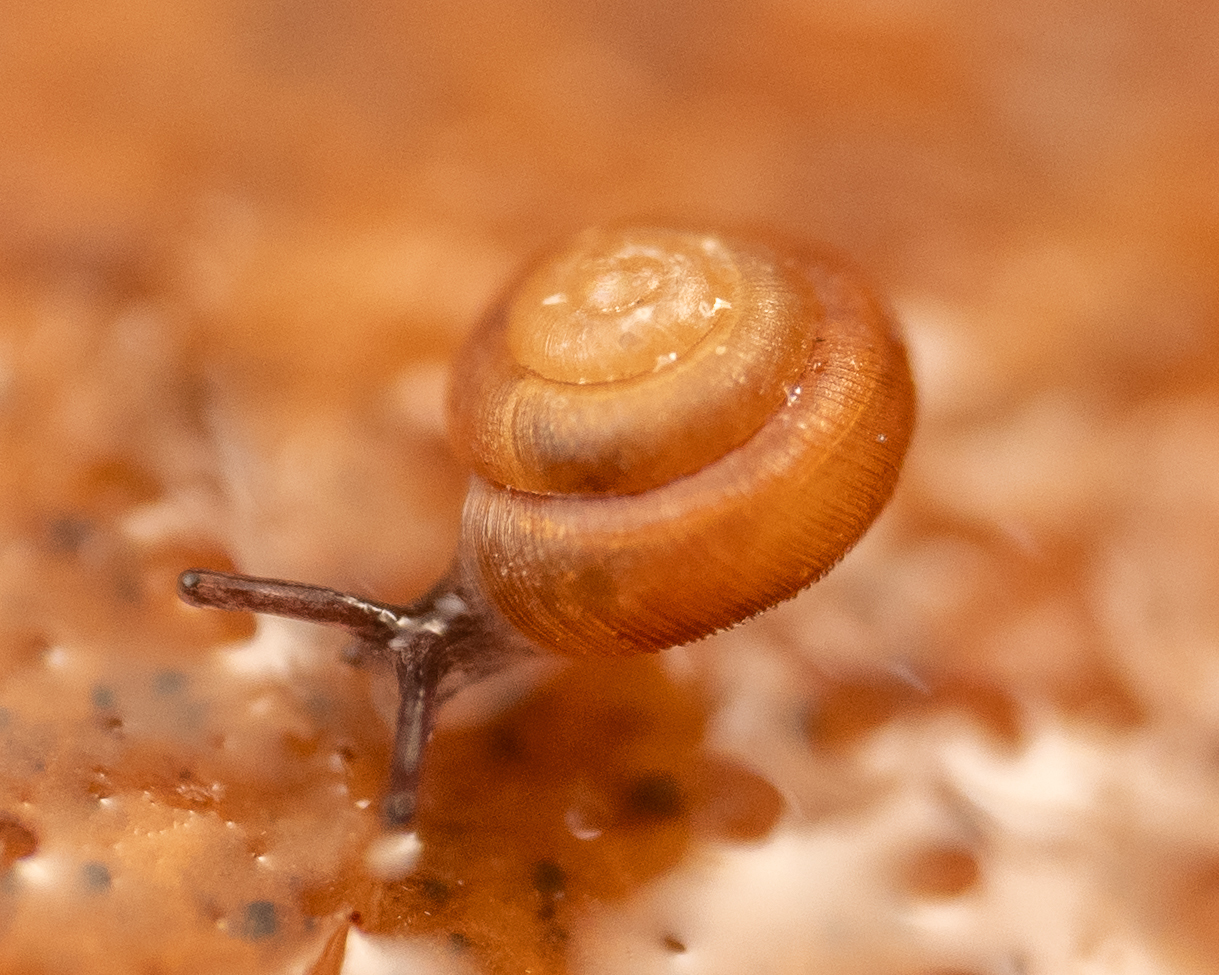
Punctum randolphii
