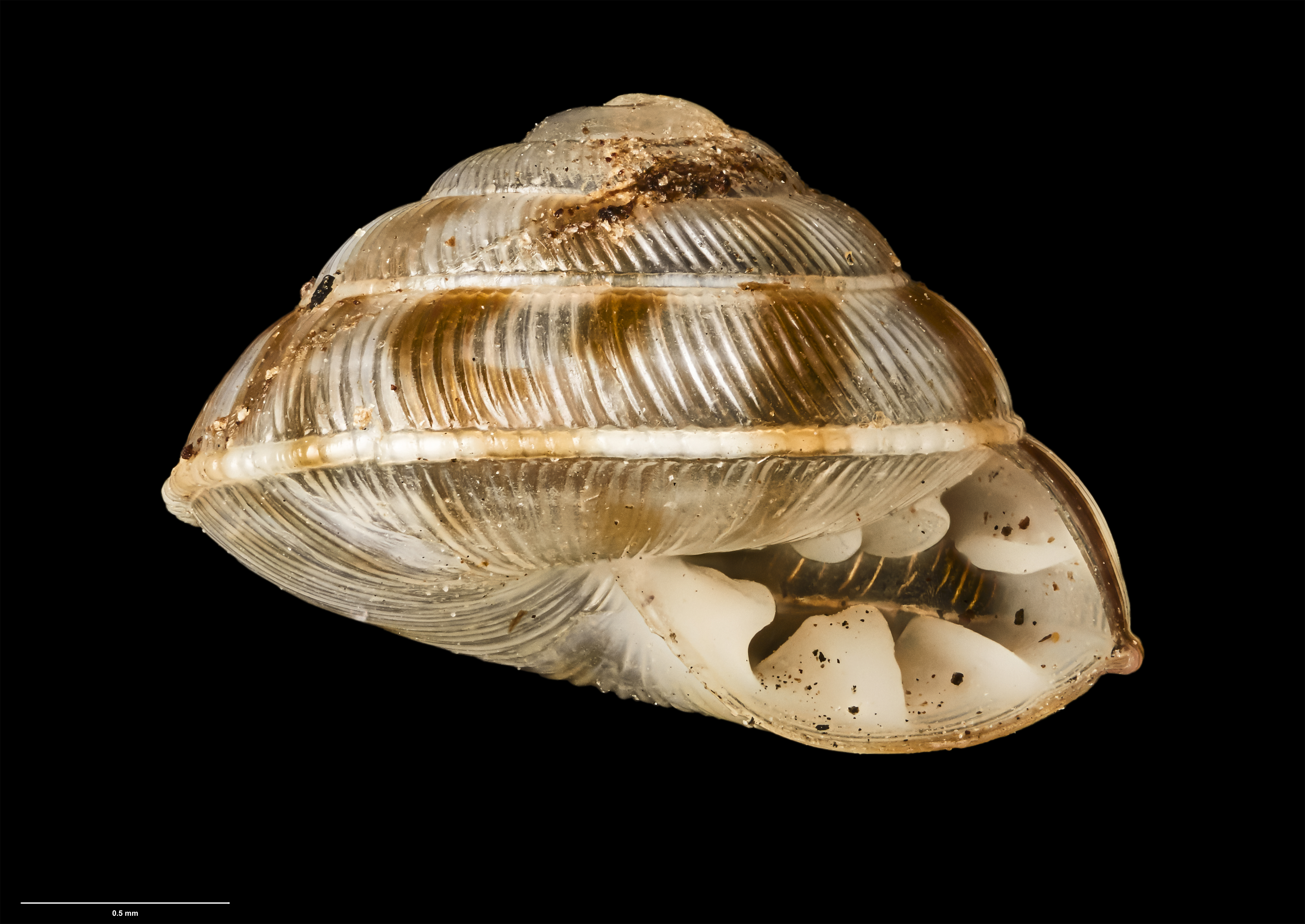
- Holotype

Conservation status
- Naturally Uncommon (NZ TCS)

Scientific classification
- Kingdom: Animalia
- Phylum: Mollusca
- Class: Gastropoda
- Order: Stylommatophora
- Family: Punctidae
- Subfamily: Laominae
- Genus: Laoma
- Species: L. labyrinthica

Binomial name
- Laoma labyrinthica A. W. B. Powell, 1948

= Laoma labyrinthica =

Species of land snail

Laoma labyrinthica is a species of land snail belonging to the family Punctidae. First described in 1948, the species is endemic to Manawatāwhi / Three Kings Islands, northwest of mainland New Zealand.

== Description ==
In the original description, Powell described the species as follows:

Shell very small, trochiform, carinated, narrowly perforated, regularly and closely radially ribbed, subtranslucent white, radially streaked with broad patches of reddish brown; aperture with massive lamellate processes. Whorls five, including a smooth protoconch of 1½ whorls. Post-nuclear whorls sculptured with distinct, rounded, slightly retractively arcuate radials (about 80 on penultimate and over 100 on the body-whorl), equally well developed on both dorsal and ventral surfaces, but interrupted at the acutely angled periphery by a sharply raised rounded supra-sutural carina. Spire broadly conical, convex sided, about one and a-third times height of aperture. Aperture-rhomboidal with thin discontinuous peristome, strengthened within by massive lamellate processes—one on the columella, two on the parietal wall, two within the outer lip above the carina, the uppermost very weak, and two on the basal lip. The most massive members are the columellar one and the proximal of the pair within the basal lip. The two within the outer lip are the least developed. The main processes are so large that they almost bridge the aperture.

The holotype has a diameter of 2.35 mm (0.093 in), and a height of 1.5 mm (0.059 in). The species can be distinguished from Laoma marina due to having a much smaller adult size, having more distant and definite radial sculpture, a conspicuous colour pattern of broad patches of reddish-brown, and massive development of the apertural processes.

The species' reproductive system is typical of Punctidae, and has a short atrium, a long, cylindrical penis and a long vagina, and no epiphallus. The radula has the formula 35-36 + 1 + 35-36, with a tricuspid central tooth, weak lateral cusps, and all other teeth bicuspid.

== Taxonomy ==
The species was described by Baden Powell in 1948. The holotype is held by the Auckland War Memorial Museum, and was collected by Powell himself in December 1945 from Manawatāwhi / Great Island on Manawatāwhi / Three Kings Islands.

== Distribution and habitat ==
L. labyrinthica is endemic to the Manawatāwhi / Three Kings Islands of New Zealand, and is the only known member of Laoma to occur here. The species is found on Manawatāwhi / Great Island, Oromaki / North East Island and Moekawa / South West Island, but not Ōhau / West Island. L. labyrinthica is restricted to remnant broadleaf forest and areas of kānuka scrub with loose rubble. The holotype was found amongst kānuka scrub, in leaf mould on the underside of decaying wood.

== Gallery ==
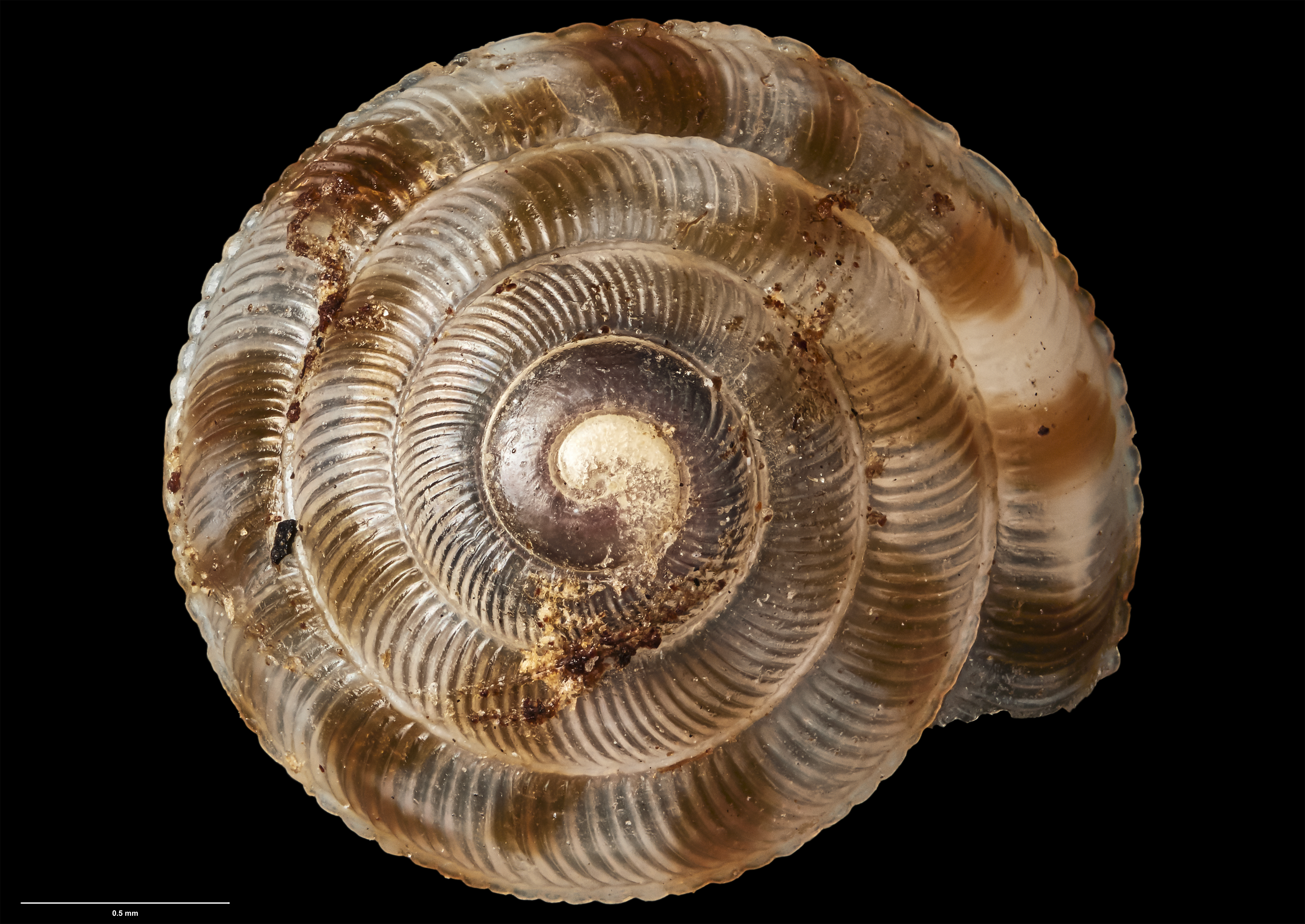
Top-down view of L. labyrinthica holotype

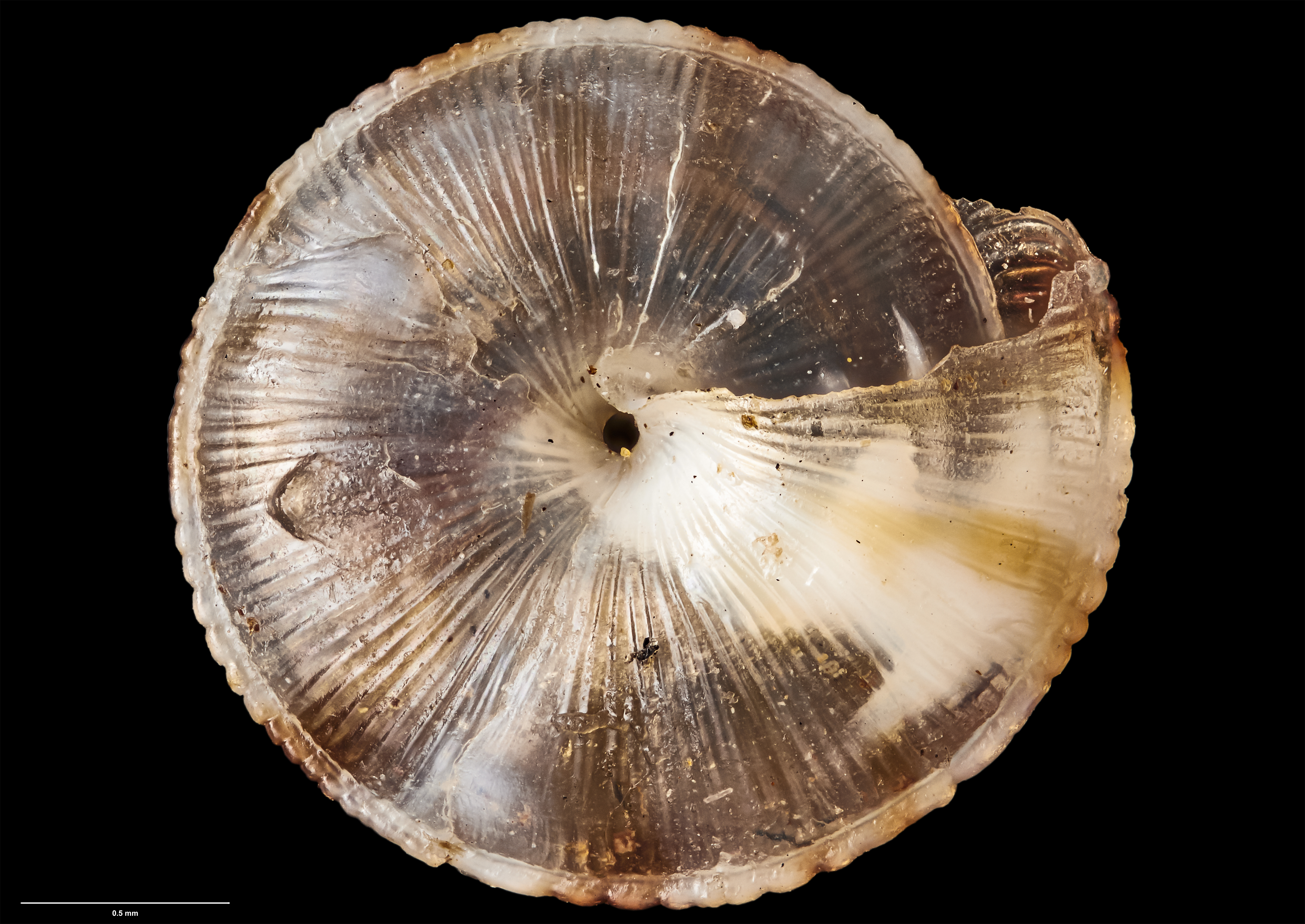
Underside view of L. labyrinthica holotype
