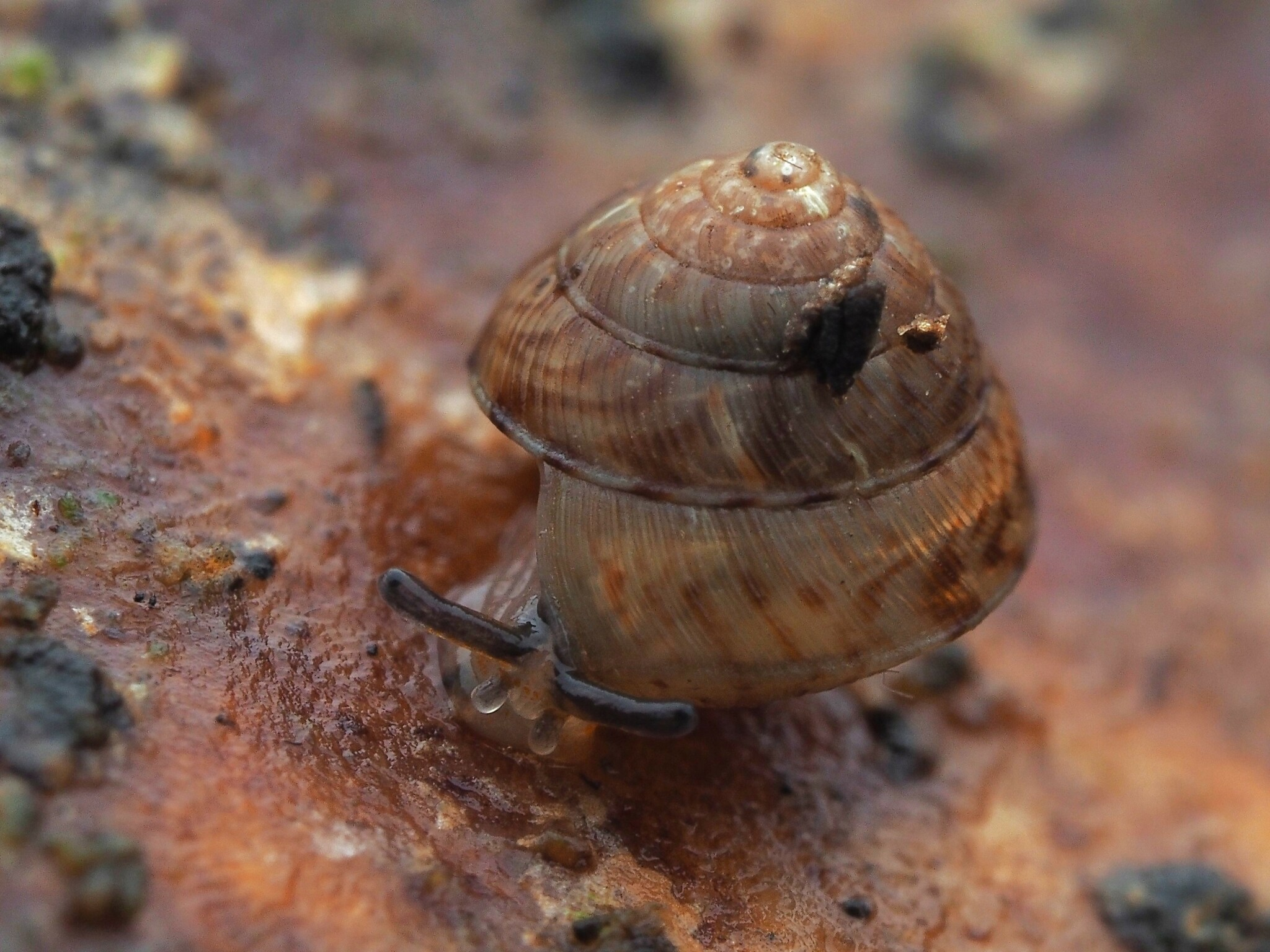
- Living Laoma ordishi seen in Titirangi, Auckland, New Zealand

Scientific classification
- Kingdom: Animalia
- Phylum: Mollusca
- Class: Gastropoda
- Order: Stylommatophora
- Family: Punctidae
- Subfamily: Laominae
- Genus: Laoma
- Species: L. ordishi

Binomial name
- Laoma ordishi Climo, 2019

= Laoma ordishi =

Species of land snail

Laoma ordishi is a species of land snail belonging to the family Punctidae. First described in 2019, the species is endemic to New Zealand.

== Description ==
L. ordishi has a small trochiform shell with 5.5 whorls. The shell is thin, transparent, and streaked with brown bands. The species has an impressed, strongly margined suture and a conic spire. The protoconch has 1.5–1.75 whorls, and is sculptured with up to 16 spiral lirae, and axial ridges that are oblique, irregular and weak. The shell of the species measures approximately 2.45 mm (0.096 in) wide and 2.1 mm (0.083 in) in height. It can be distinguished from other members of Laoma due to having a smaller shell size, and due to having a different protoconch sculpture.

== Taxonomy ==
The species was described by Frank Climo in 2019, who named the species after Te Papa entomologist Ron Garth Ordish, who collected the earliest known specimen of the species from Great Barrier Island in 1964. The holotype is held by the Auckland War Memorial Museum, and was collected by D. J. Roscoe in 2010 from Taranga Island / Hen Island.

== Distribution and habitat ==
L. ordishi is endemic to New Zealand, occurring between Northland, South Waikato, East Cape, on Taranga Island / Hen Island, and on Great Barrier Island.

== Gallery ==
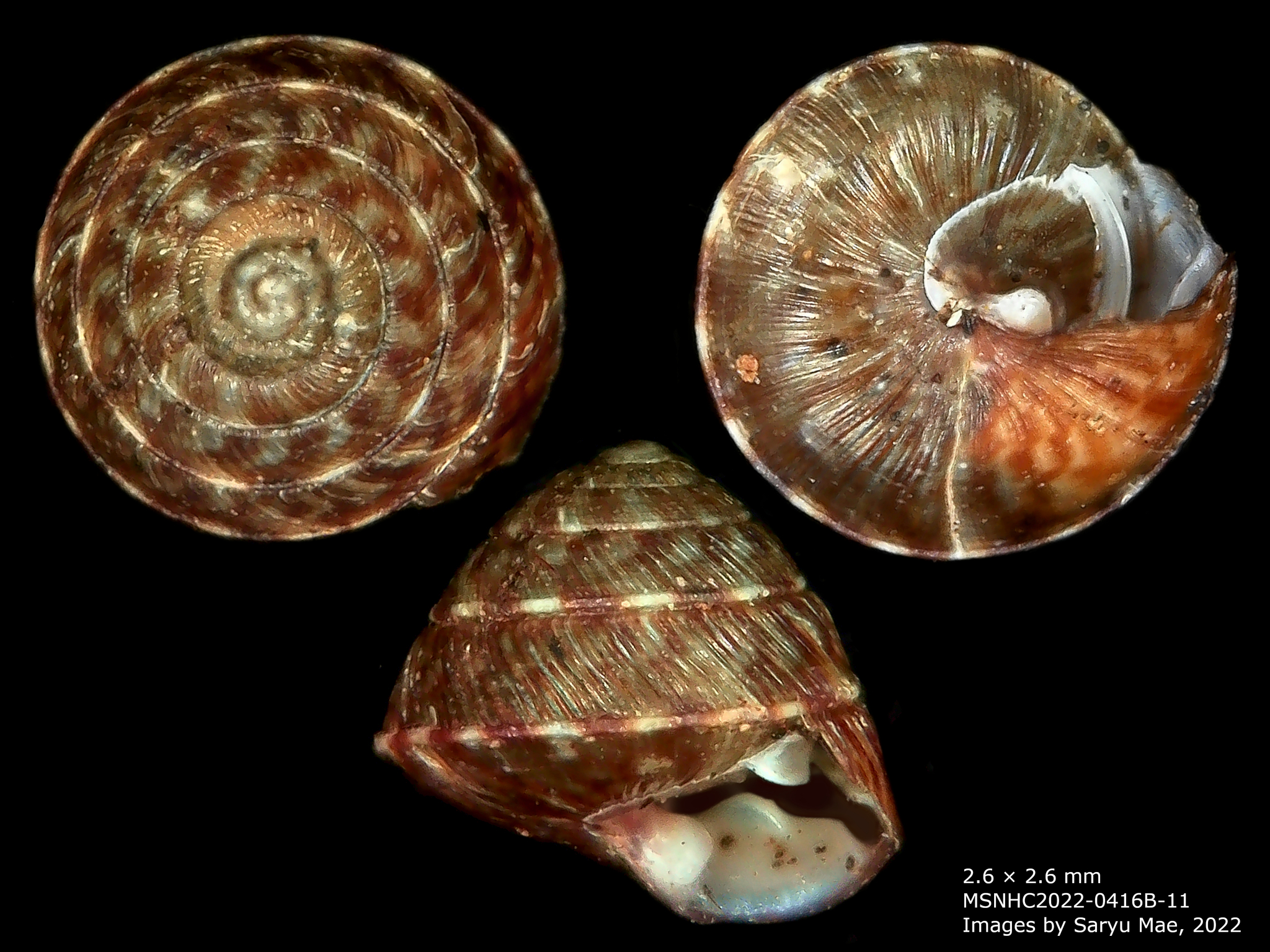
Shell of L. ordishi

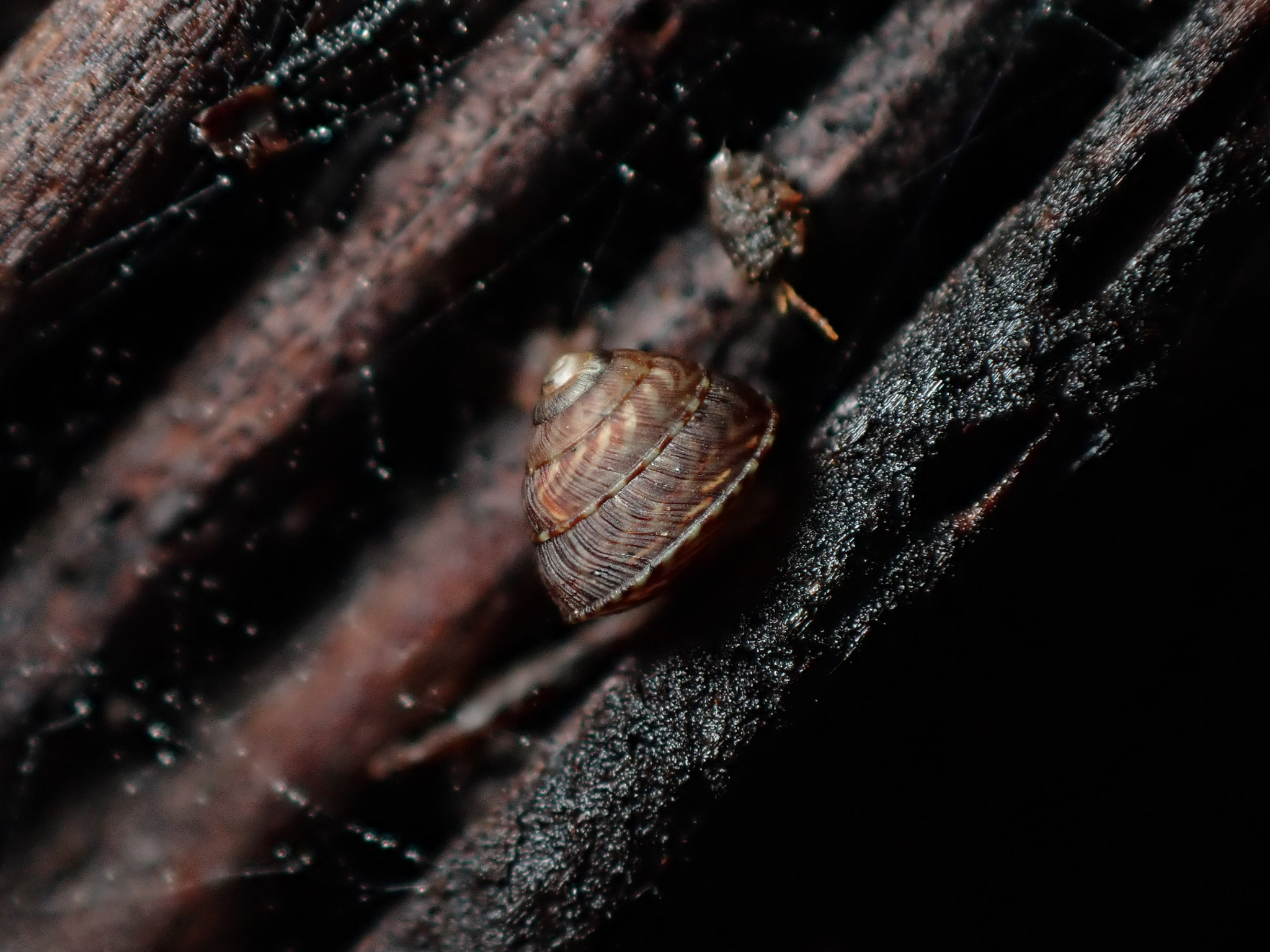
Lateral view of L. ordishi

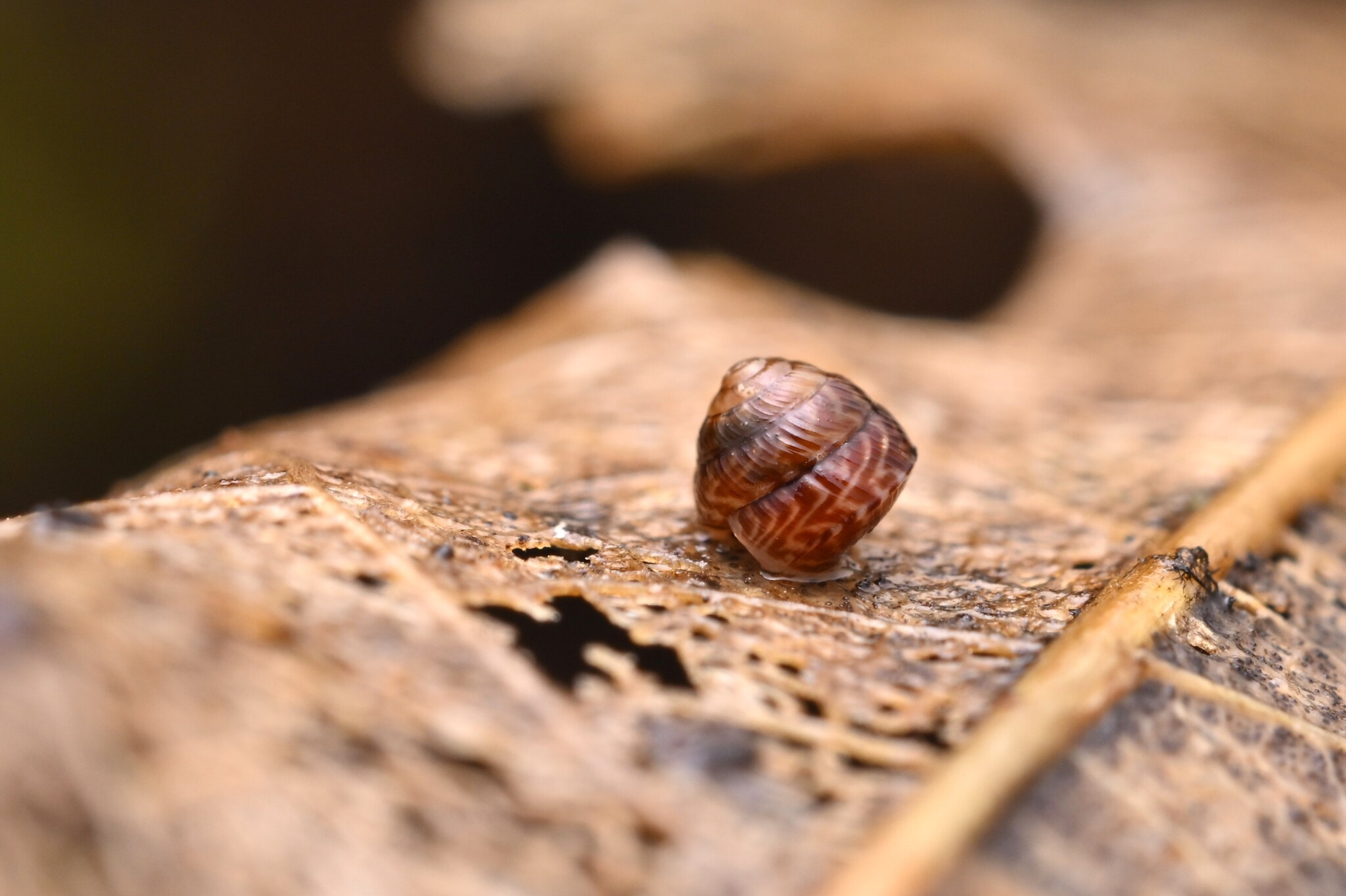
L. ordishi on a leaf
