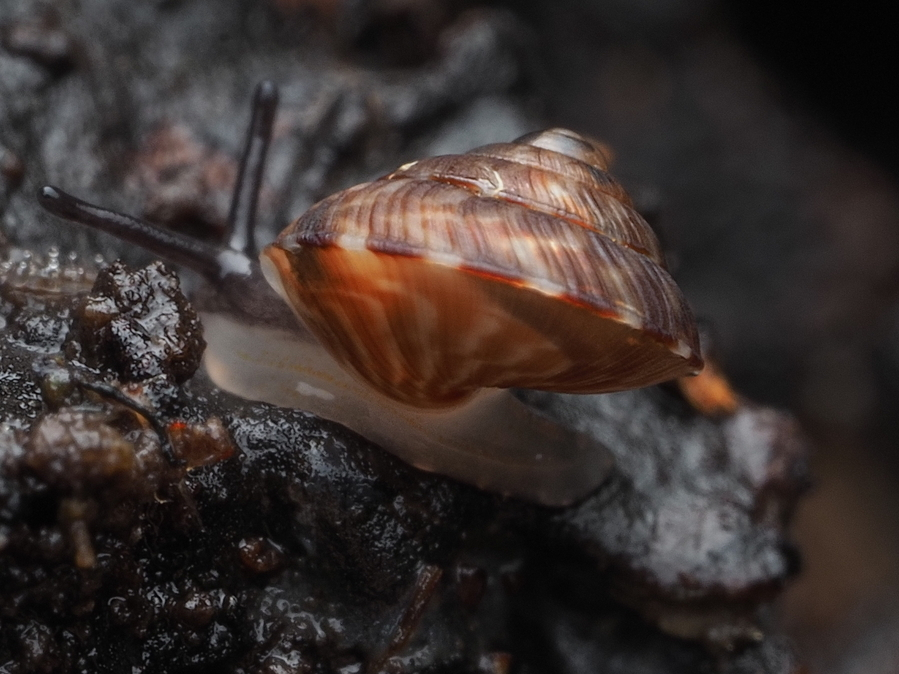
- Laoma nerissa

Scientific classification
- Kingdom: Animalia
- Phylum: Mollusca
- Class: Gastropoda
- Order: Stylommatophora
- Family: Punctidae
- Subfamily: Laominae
- Genus: Laoma; J. E. Gray, 1850

Type species
- Laoma leimonias

Synonyms
- Bulimus (Laoma) J. E. Gray, 1850; Laoma (Laoma) J. E. Gray, 1850; Phrixgnathus (Laoma) (J. E. Gray, 1850)

= Laoma =

Genus of gastropods

Laoma is a genus of land snails belonging to the family Punctidae. All known members of the genus are endemic to New Zealand.

== Taxonomy ==
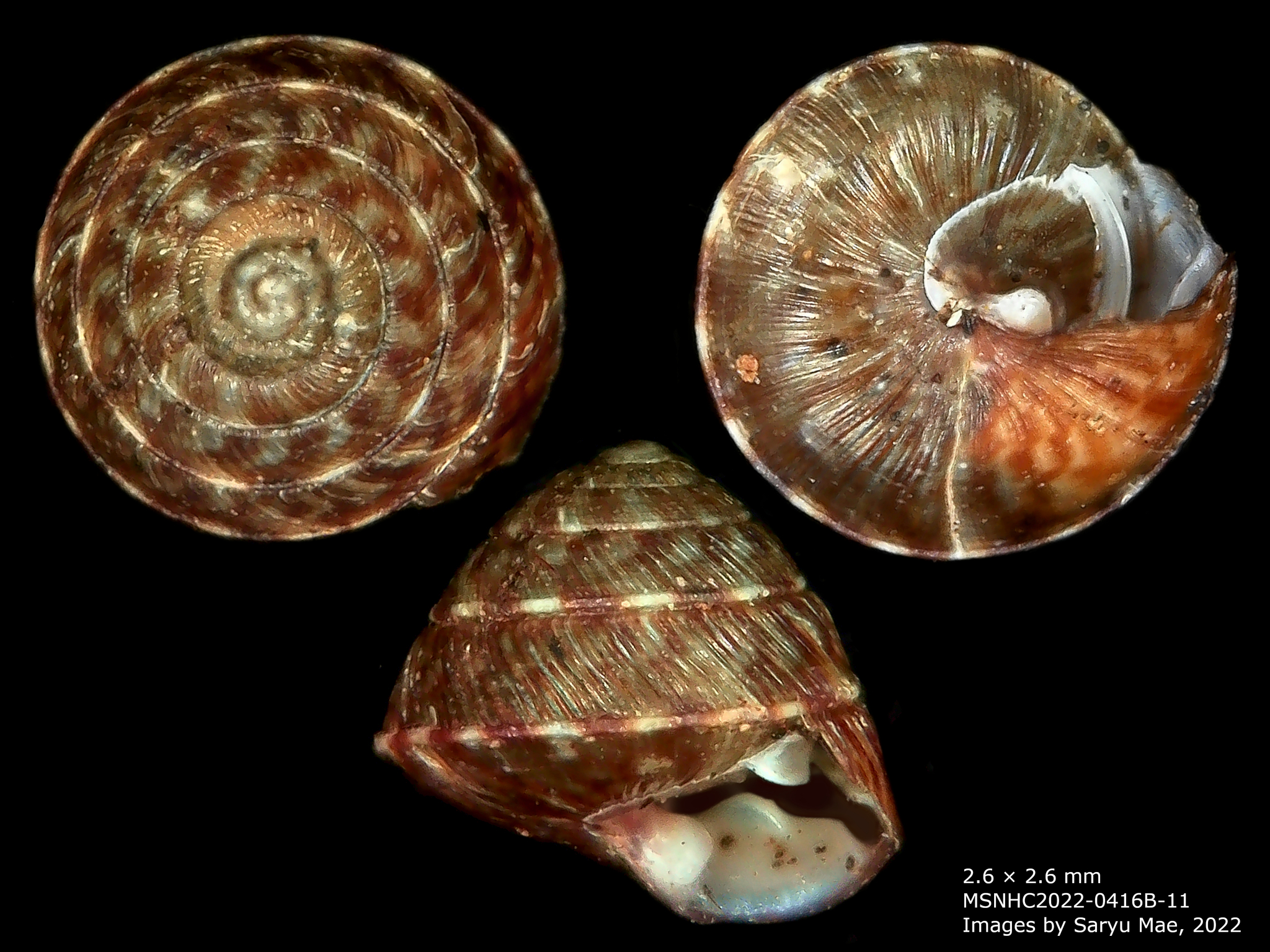
Shell of Laoma ordishi

The genus was first described by John Edward Gray in 1850, as a subgenus, Bulimus (Laoma). Grey named Laoma leimonias as the type species. In 1891, Henry Suter moved the subgenus to Phrixgnathus. In the following year, Henry Augustus Pilsbry raised Laoma to genus level. Phrixgnathus, formerly considered a subgenus of Laoma, has been treated as a separate genus since at least 1993. Taguahelix, described as a subgenus of Laoma in 1955, was also raised to genus level in 1993.

Phylogenetic analysis places Laoma within the family Punctidae as a basal group, closely related to the genus Phrixgnathus. Both genera likely diverged from Paralaoma and Punctum at least as early as the Oligocene.

== Distribution ==
The genus is endemic to New Zealand.

== Species ==
Species within the genus Laoma include:

- Laoma ciliata Suter, 1894
- Laoma labyrinthica A. W. B. Powell, 1948
- Laoma leimonias (J. E. Gray, 1850)
- Laoma mariae (J. E. Gray, 1843)
- Laoma marina (F. W. Hutton, 1883)
- Laoma minuta Climo, 1971
- Laoma nerissa (F. W. Hutton, 1883)
- Laoma ordishi Climo, 2019
