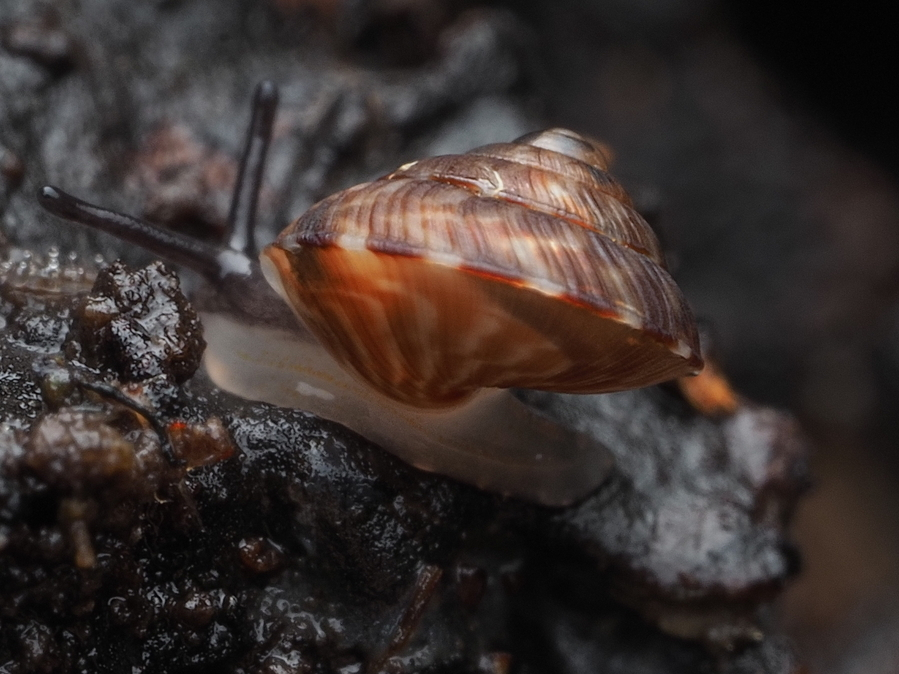
- Living Laoma nerissa seen in Titirangi, Auckland, New Zealand

Scientific classification
- Kingdom: Animalia
- Phylum: Mollusca
- Class: Gastropoda
- Order: Stylommatophora
- Family: Punctidae
- Subfamily: Laominae
- Genus: Laoma
- Species: L. nerissa

Binomial name
- Laoma nerissa (F. W. Hutton, 1883)

Synonyms
- Endodonta nerissa F. W. Hutton, 1883; Phrixgnathus (Laoma) nerissa (F. W. Hutton, 1883); Phrixgnathus nerissa (F. W. Hutton, 1883)

= Laoma nerissa =

Species of land snail

Laoma nerissa is a species of land snail belonging to the family Punctidae. First described in 1883, the species is endemic to New Zealand.

== Description ==
In the original description, Hutton described the species as follows:

Pale horny, with indistinct bands of chestnut; spire conoidal, obtuse; suture margined; sub-perforate; a columellar plait and six parietal plaits, three of which are on the basal margin; diameter 0.11 in (2.8 mm).

L. nerissa has a shell measuring 2.32 mm (0.091 in) with a height of 1.41 mm (0.056 in). The shell is trochiform, carinated, narrowly umbilicated, and has five whorls. The pustulate protoconch has 1.5–1.75 whorls and 10–12 spiral lirae. The lirae are broken up by irregular oblique axial ridges, which creates a beaded sculpture for the shells. It can be distinguished from other members of Laoma due to its two long parietal lamellae (the upper being larger), a long palatal lamella above and parallel to the three large basal lamellae, and stronger protoconch and teleoconch sculpture and carina.

== Taxonomy ==
The species was described by Frederick Hutton in 1883, under the name Endodonta nerissa. The holotype was collected from Remuera, Auckland by Thomas Cheeseman. In 1891, the species was moved to Phrixgnathus (Laoma) by Henry Suter, and in the same publication synonymised with Laoma marina. Suter believed the species was a juvenile form of L. marina. Frank Climo reinstated the species in 2019, due to shell and reproductive anatomy differences.

== Distribution and habitat ==
L. nerissa is endemic to New Zealand, occurring between Auckland and Wellington on the North Island, and the Marlborough District and Nelson on the upper South Island.

== Gallery ==
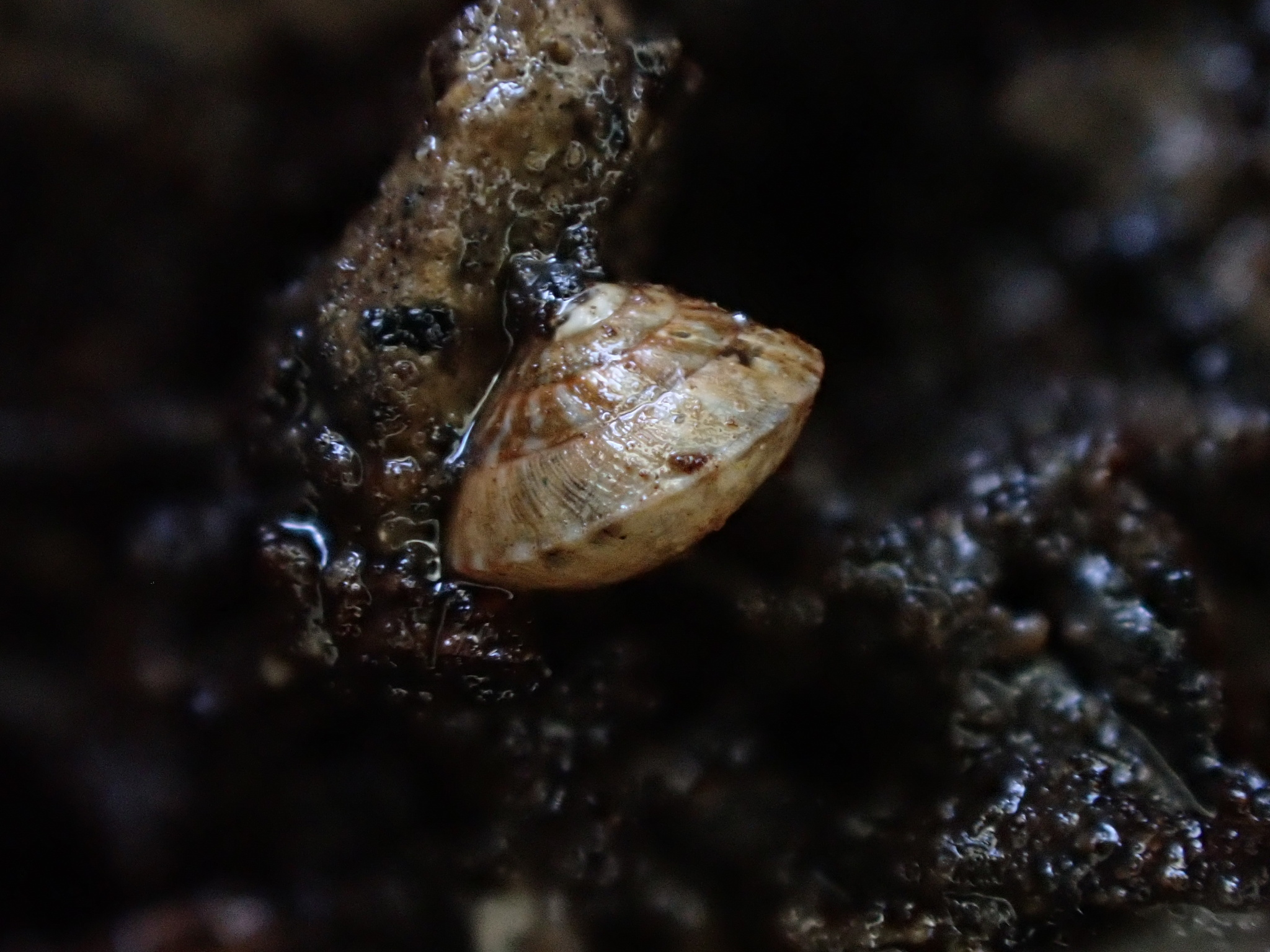
Lateral view of living L. nerissa

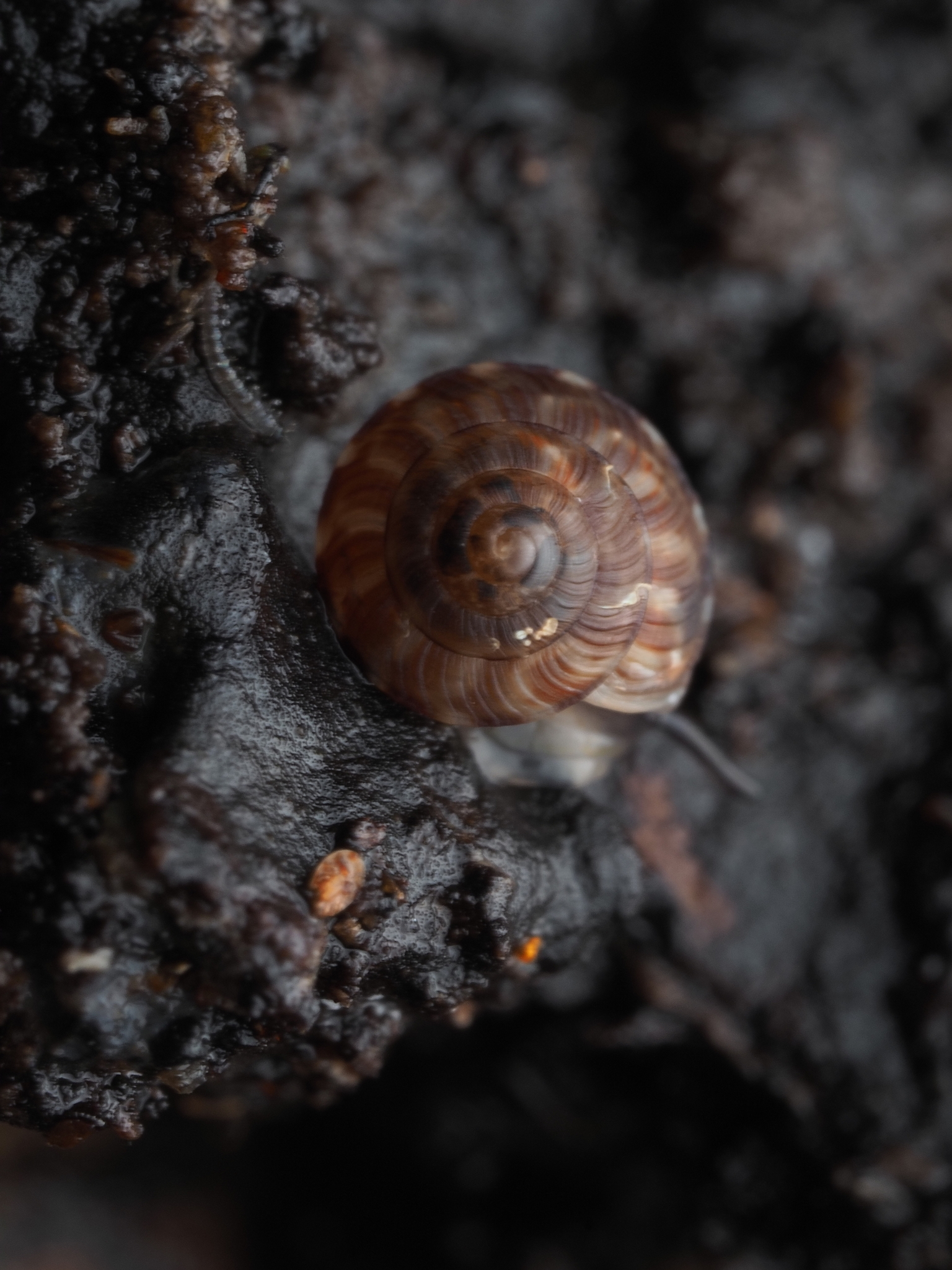
Top-down view of living L. nerissa

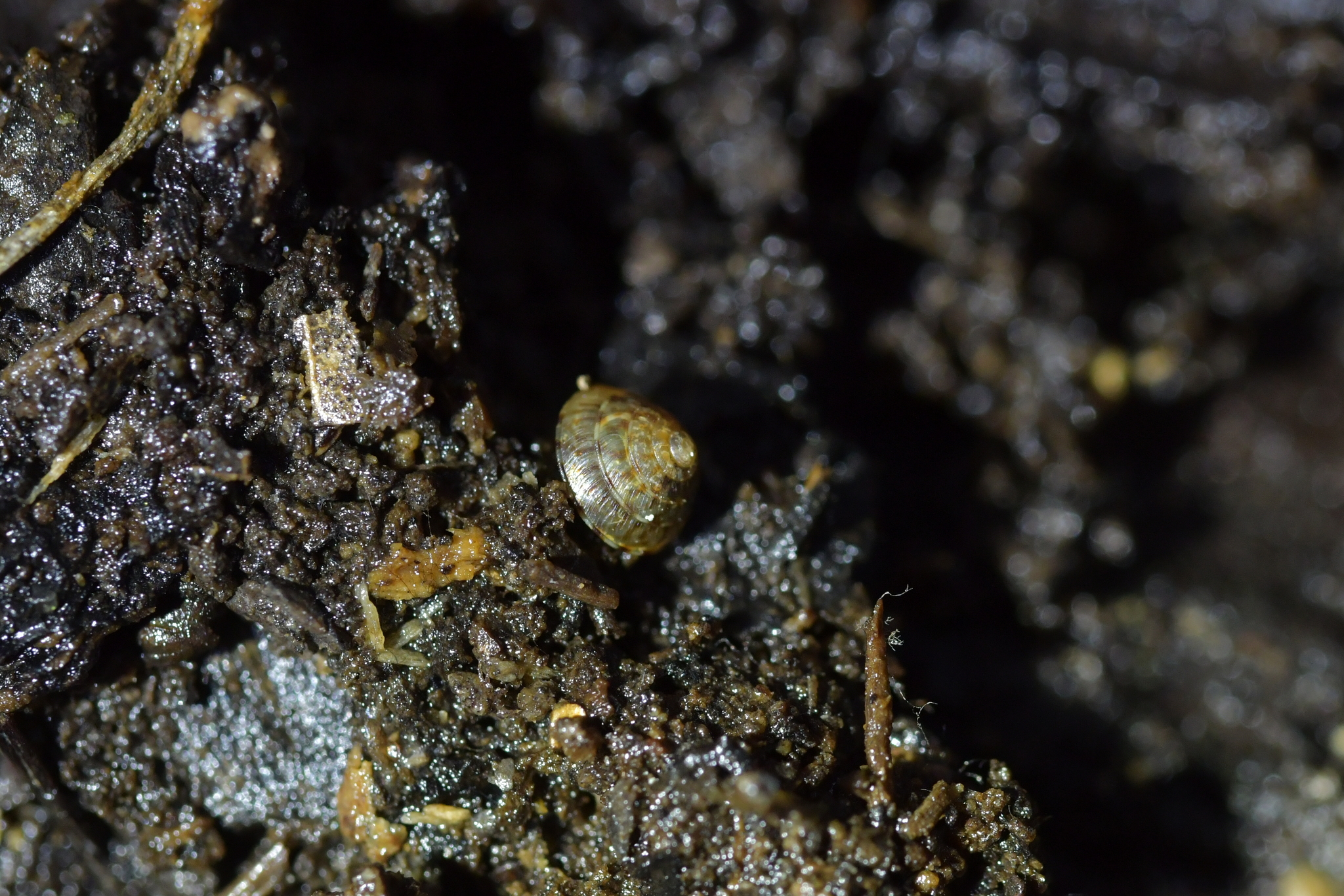
Shell in soil in Upper Hutt
