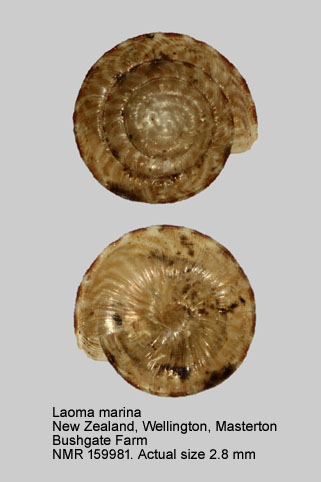
- Type specimen

Scientific classification
- Kingdom: Animalia
- Phylum: Mollusca
- Class: Gastropoda
- Order: Stylommatophora
- Family: Punctidae
- Subfamily: Laominae
- Genus: Laoma
- Species: L. marina

Binomial name
- Laoma marina (F. W. Hutton, 1883)

Synonyms
- Endodonta marina F. W. Hutton, 1883; Laoma (Laoma) marina (F. W. Hutton, 1883); Phrixgnathus (Laoma) marina (F. W. Hutton, 1883); Phrixgnathus marina (F. W. Hutton, 1883)

= Laoma marina =

Species of land snail

Laoma marina is a species of land snail belonging to the family Punctidae. First described in 1883, the species is endemic to New Zealand.

== Description ==
In the original description, Hutton described the species as follows:

Pale yellow, faintly marked with chestnut; spire conoidal, rather obtuse; suture margined; sub-perforate; a columellar plait, and two parietal plaits, none of which are on the basal margin; diameter 0.13 in (3.3 mm).

The species has a small shell with 4.25 whorls, measuring 2 mm (0.079 in) in width and 1.38 mm (0.054 in) in height. The shell is trochiform, carinated, very narrowly umbilicated and thin. The suture is margined and impressed, and the species has a conic spire, equal to the height of the aperture. The protoconch has 1.5 whorls, and is sculptured with 15 or more narrowly-spaced fine spiral lirae.

The species can be distinguished from other members of Laoma due to having a larger shell, fewer apertural lamellae, weaker shell sculpture, weaker carina, and small or obsolete umbilicus.

== Taxonomy ==
The species was described by Frederick Hutton in 1883, under the name Endodonta marina. In 1891, the species was moved to Phrixgnathus (Laoma) by Henry Suter, and in the same publication synonymised Laoma nerissa with L. marina, believing this was a juvenile form of L. marina. In the following year, Henry Augustus Pilsbry raised Laoma to genus level, making the currently accepted name of the species Laoma marina. It was redescribed in 2019, after L. nerissa was reinstated.

== Distribution and habitat ==
L. marina is endemic to New Zealand, occurring between in Auckland, the Coromandel Peninsula, northwards to the Hokianga Harbour, the Waikato, Wellington Region, and the upper South Island. The species tends to live in forest floor leaf litter, such as in fallen nīkau palm fronds.
