= Glomerellina =

Scientific classification
- Domain: Eukaryota
- Kingdom: Animalia
- Phylum: Arthropoda
- Subphylum: Myriapoda
- Class: Diplopoda
- Order: Glomerida
- Family: Glomeridae
- Genus: Glomerellina; Silvestri, 1908
- Species: G. laurae

Binomial name
- Glomerellina laurae Silvestri, 1908

Genus of millipedes

Glomerellina is a genus of pill millipede of the family Glomeridae.

== Description ==
Glomerellina millipedes have bodies composed of ten mesotergites, not counting the head, neck, and anal valves. These segments are smooth except for at the smallest points. They possess eyes and a Tömösvary's organ. The genus is particularly distinguished by the concave sides of the front to accommodate the distinctively short antennae, and the lateral width of the first mesotergite.

Glomerellina millipedes, like other pill millipedes, can curl into a ball.

== Species ==
The genus Glomerellina currently contains only one known species.

- Glomerellina laurae Silvestri, 1908
