= Strasseria =

Strasseria is the scientific name of two genera of organisms and may refer to:

- Strasseria (millipede), a genus of millipedes in the family Glomeridae
- Strasseria (fungus), a genus of fungi in the family Phacidiaceae
