= Apiomeris =

Scientific classification
- Kingdom: Animalia
- Phylum: Arthropoda
- Subphylum: Myriapoda
- Class: Diplopoda
- Order: Glomerida
- Family: Glomeridae
- Subfamily: Haploglomerinae
- Genus: Apiomeris; Cook, 1896

Genus of millipedes

Apiomeris is a genus of pill millipede found in North and East India, Myanmar, Thailand, and the Malay Archipelago to Celebes.

== Description ==
The body is composed of the head, neck, two-segmented trunk, and anal segment. The head is wider than it is long and slightly ridged near the Tömösváry organ. Eyes are arranged in small, arched clusters along the sides of the forehead. Antennae have eight segments, with the sixth being the longest. They are covered with setae and have four sensory cones at the tips.

Like other pill millipedes, those of the Apiomeris genus can curl into a ball.

== Species ==
Most of the species once attributed to the Apiomeris genus have since been re-described as belonging to the genera Apheromeris and Hyleoglomeris. The following remain.

- Apiomeris concolor Pocock, 1889
- Apiomeris infuscata Pocock, 1894
