= Adenomeris =

Scientific classification
- Domain: Eukaryota
- Kingdom: Animalia
- Phylum: Arthropoda
- Subphylum: Myriapoda
- Class: Diplopoda
- Order: Glomerida
- Family: Glomeridae
- Genus: Adenomeris; Ribaut, 1909

Genus of millipedes

Adenomeris is a genus of pill millipede of the family Glomeridae and the subfamily Doderiinae.

== Description ==
Adenomeris millipedes have a trunk composed of 13 tergites, without pigmentation. Like the genus Gervaisia, they possess gnathochilarium and a more developed second tergite. Their tergites are not ridged. While they do not have eyes, their Tömösvary organ is very developed, being larger than the antennal sockets and as wide as it is long. The head is angular in shape.

Adenomeris millipedes have glands arranged transversely in rows parallel to the posterior edge of the tergites which secrete a transparent, soft, elastic substance.

Females have 17 pairs of legs while males have 19 pairs.

== Species ==
- Adenomeris gibbosa Mauriès, 1960
- Adenomeris hispida Ribaut, 1909
- Adenomeris viscaiana Mauriès & Barraqueta, 1985
