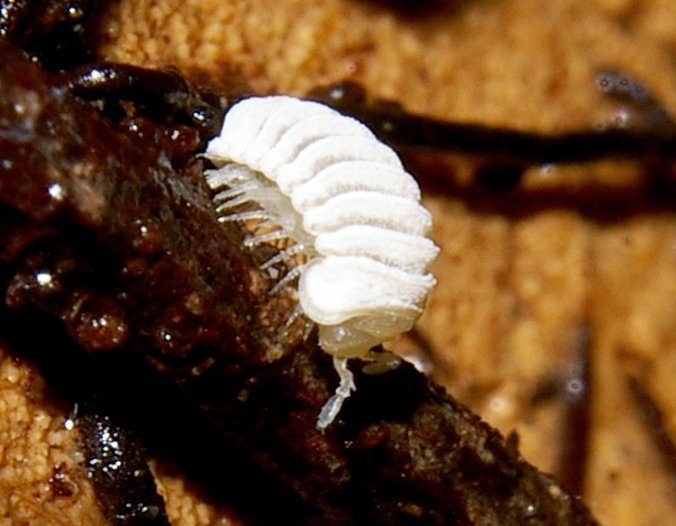

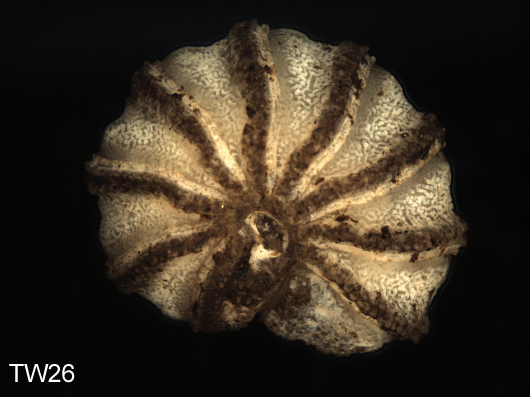

Scientific classification
- Kingdom: Animalia
- Phylum: Arthropoda
- Subphylum: Myriapoda
- Class: Diplopoda
- Order: Glomerida
- Family: Glomeridae
- Genus: Trachysphaera
- Species: T. lobata

Binomial name
- Trachysphaera lobata (Ribaut, 1954)

= Trachysphaera lobata =

Species of millipede

Trachysphaera lobata, also known as the sand pill millipede, is a species of pill millipede within the genus Trachysphaera and family Glomeridae.

== Description ==
Trachysphaera lobata is a small pill millipede species which can roll into a ball of up to 3 mm in diameter. Each body segments posterior margin has a raised ridge which is adorned with rows of tubercles. T. lobata has been recorded to reach lengths up to 4.1 mm long and a width of 1.9 mm wide. Individuals possess 17 pairs of legs. Eyes consist of a row of 4 or 5 ocelli. Young T. lobata are white, however adult are brown in colour.

== Distribution ==
Trachysphaera lobata is present within the United Kingdom where populations exist in Cornwall, the Isle of Wight and South Wales. It can also be found in France where populations have been found in the western side of the country.

== Habitat ==
Trachysphaera lobata can be found in woodlands inside soil, leaf litter and dead wood. Preferred soils are sandy and humus rich where the millipede can be found at depths of 15 cm. In France T. lobata is found in a variety of calcareous sites ranging from woodlands, caves and quarries.
