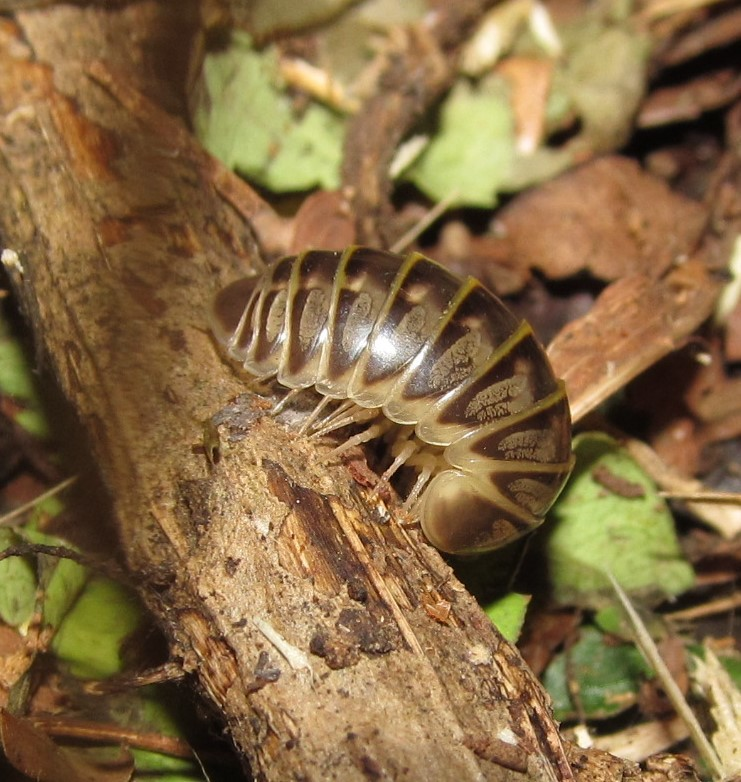
- Peplomeris magna

Scientific classification
- Kingdom: Animalia
- Phylum: Arthropoda
- Subphylum: Myriapoda
- Class: Diplopoda
- Order: Glomerida
- Family: Glomeridae
- Genus: Peplomeris; Silvestri, 1917

= Peplomeris =

Genus of millipedes

Peplomeris is a genus of pill millipedes found in Vietnam.

== Description ==
Peplomeris millipedes possess numerous apical cones on their antennae. The seventh antennal joint is short. The last tergite has a sinuous posterior margin at the midline, with a somewhat flattened dorsal surface. Leg pairs 17 and 18 are smaller than the others. Leg pair 19 is 4-jointed, with the first segment possessing a short, cone-shaped internal apical process, and the second possessing a triangular internal posterior process, and the third with a short posterior process.

The genus can be clearly distinguished from the genus Rhopalomeris by the shape of the last tergite and length of the tarsi.

== Species ==
- Peplomeris demangei (Silvestri, 1917)
- Peplomeris magna Golovatch, 1983
