= Tectosphaera =

Scientific classification
- Kingdom: Animalia
- Phylum: Arthropoda
- Subphylum: Myriapoda
- Class: Diplopoda
- Order: Glomerida
- Family: Glomeridae
- Genus: Tectosphaera; Mauriès, 2005
- Species: T. vicenteae

Binomial name
- Tectosphaera vicenteae Mauriès, 2005

Genus of millipedes

Tectosphaera is a genus of pill millipede found in Northwestern Iberia. It currently contains only one known species, Tectosphaera vicenteae.

== Description ==
Tectosphaera millipedes are approximately 3–4 mm in length. The thoracic shield has a lateral circular groove to accommodate the lateral tips of the tergites when the millipede is curled up in a defensive posture. The head possesses a Y-shaped crest and antennal grooves.

Like those of other Doderiinae millipedes, male Tectosphaera millipedes have telopods at the 19th pair of legs, the femur of which bears a long, internal distal process on its caudal surface. The 17th pair of legs possesses non-rounded syncoxal lobes and 3-segmented telopodites.

The tergites of Tectosphaera millipedes are smooth, without tranverse ridges. They are densely and strongly punctuated. The penultimate 11th tergite extends into a posterior pseudo-telson. The corselet possesses hollow lateral lobes, similar to those of the Trachysphaera genus.

== Etymology ==
The name Tectosphaera is derived from the Latin tecto, which means roof, referring to the shape of the penultimate tergite, and sphaera, meaning ball.
