= Cantabromeris =

Scientific classification
- Kingdom: Animalia
- Phylum: Arthropoda
- Subphylum: Myriapoda
- Class: Diplopoda
- Order: Glomerida
- Family: Glomeridae
- Subfamily: Glomerinae
- Tribe: Onychoglomerini
- Genus: Cantabromeris; Mauriès, 2006

Genus of millipedes

Cantabromeris is a genus of pill millipede found on the Iberian Peninsula. Though originally identified as part of the genus Protoglomeris, Cantabromeris was revised as a new genus due to key morphological differences, such as the vestigial character of the penultimate tergite.

The genus Cantabromeris currently contains only one known species, Cantabromeris cantabrica.

== Description ==
Millipedes of the type species Cantabromeris cantabrica are approximately 7.5mm in length, with a width of approximately 4.2mm at the fifth body ring, 13 of which are visible. The 12th ring is fused to the last. The body of this species is uniform black in coloration, except for the rear edge on each tergite and a wide orange-yellow band just before the second tergite. The 4th to 11th tergites also have white spots on the anterior edge, which are only visible when the millipede assumes a curled up defensive posture.

Like other members of the Glomeridae family, the sides of the face are slightly flattened to accommodate the antennae. The Tömösváry organ is 1.2 times longer than wide. It has rows of six aligned ocelli.
