= Nearctomeris =

Scientific classification
- Kingdom: Animalia
- Phylum: Arthropoda
- Subphylum: Myriapoda
- Class: Diplopoda
- Order: Glomerida
- Family: Glomeridae
- Genus: Nearctomeris; Wesener, 2012

Genus of millipedes

Nearctomeris is a genus of pill millipedes found in the southern Appalachian Mountains, in the states of Alabama, Tennessee, and North Carolina.

== Description ==
Nearctomeris millipedes strongly resemble those of the Onomeris genus, having a nearly identical size (4–5.5 mm) and similar dark coloration.

== Species ==
- Nearctomeris inexpectata Wesener, 2012
- Nearctomeris smoky Recuero & Caterino, 2023
