= Doderia =

Scientific classification
- Kingdom: Animalia
- Phylum: Arthropoda
- Subphylum: Myriapoda
- Class: Diplopoda
- Order: Glomerida
- Family: Glomeridae
- Genus: Doderia; 1904

Genus of millipedes

Doderia is a genus of pill millipedes found in Italy.

== Description ==
Like other members of the Doderiidae subfamily, Doderia millipedes possess 11 free mesotergites. The last mesosternite fully covers the head when the millipede curls into a ball. All mesosternites are highly convex and longitudinally ridged.

Doderia millipedes lack eyes but possess a large Tömösváry organ. Their antennae are geniculate, featuring a very thick sixth joint. Their labrum is deeply notched medially, and they possess mandibles with four teeth and five comb-like laminae. The hypostoma are longitudinally split.

Doderia millipedes are distinguished from other members of the Doderinae subfamily by their antennae, which feature short first and second joints, third joints twice as long, fourth and fifth joints approximately equal to each other and slightly longer than the second, and sixth joints that are obconical in shape, very thick, and longer than the third joint. The seventh joint is very short, covers the eighth joint, and has four apical sensory cones.

== Species ==
- Doderia elbana Verhoeff, 1930
- Doderia genuensis Silvestri, 1904
- Doderia lanzai Ceuca, 1974
- Doderia remyi (Verhoeff, 1943)
- Doderia tyrrhena Verhoeff, 1943
