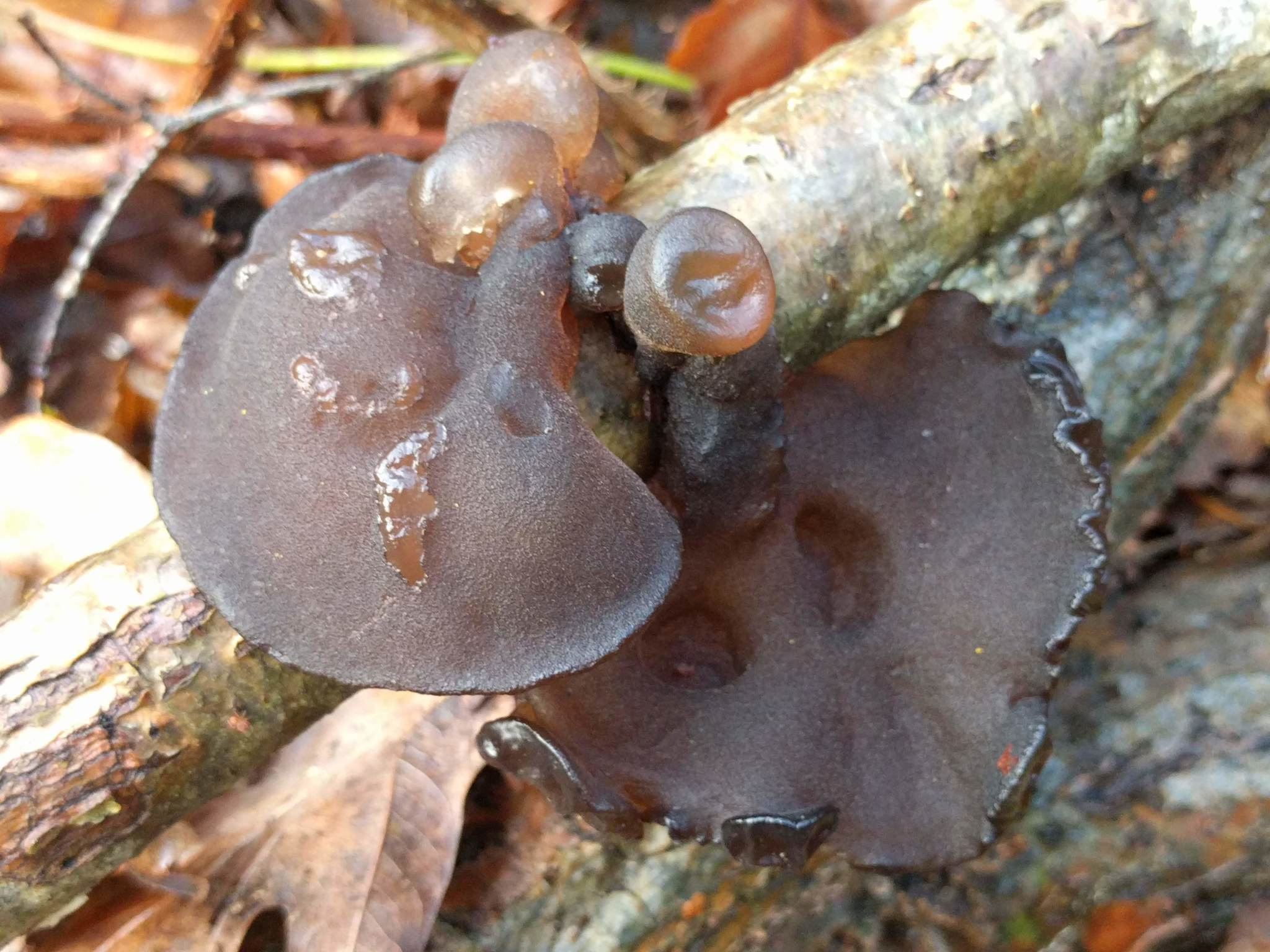
- Exidia truncata showing underside

Scientific classification
- Kingdom: Fungi
- Division: Basidiomycota
- Class: Agaricomycetes
- Order: Auriculariales
- Family: Auriculariaceae
- Genus: Exidia
- Species: E. truncata

Binomial name
- Exidia truncata Fr. (1822)

= Exidia truncata =

Species of fungus

Exidia truncata is a species of fungus in the family Auriculariaceae. The gelatinous basidiocarp (fruit bodies) are black and turbinate (top-shaped). It is a common wood-rotting fungus in Europe, typically (possibly always) growing on dead attached branches of oak. The species has recently been distinguished from the very similar Exidia glandulosa.

== Taxonomy ==
The species was originally described in 1822 by the Swedish mycologist Elias Magnus Fries. The name was used by Neuhoff for fungi forming turbinate fruit bodies on oak, as distinct from similar, coalescing fungi on other broadleaf trees that Neuhoff called Exidia glandulosa. A revision by Donk re-interpreted Exidia glandulosa as a turbinate species and placed E. truncata in synonymy, renaming E. glandulosa sensu Neuhoff as Exidia plana (later E. nigricans, now Exidia pithya).

Recent molecular research, based on cladistic analysis of DNA sequences, has shown that two turbinate species occur on oak in Europe: Exidia glandulosa, with a hirsute undersurface; and E. truncata, with a punctate undersurface.

== Description ==
Exidia truncata forms dark sepia to blackish, rubbery-gelatinous fruit bodies that are button-shaped at first, becoming turbinate and up to 5cm across. The fruitbodies occur singly or in groups, but do not coalesce. The upper, spore-bearing surface becomes irregularly folded, shiny, and dotted with small spines or pegs. The undersurface is rough, punctate or pimply.

=== Microscopic characters ===
The microscopic characters are typical of the genus Exidia. The basidia are ellipsoid, septate, 15–22 × 5–10.5 μm. The spores are cylindrical, allantoid (sausage-shaped), 14–20 × 4.5–6 μm.

=== Similar species ===
Exidia glandulosa is very similar, but has a distinctly hirsute or spiny undersurface and (microscopically) slightly shorter spores. Exidia pithya is also similar, but produces button-shaped fruit bodies that quickly coalesce, forming an effused, lobed mass that can be up to 30cm across.

The ascomycete Bulgaria inquinans forms similar, rubbery-gelatinous, blackish fruit bodies on oak. Their upper surfaces are entirely smooth, however, and they produce copious black (not white) spore prints, often leaving a black stain if wiped with the hand.

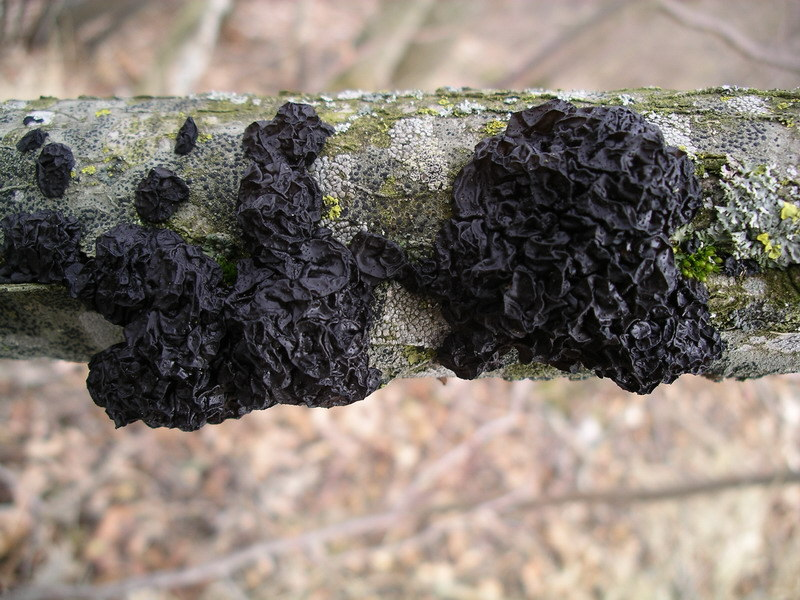
Exidia pithya

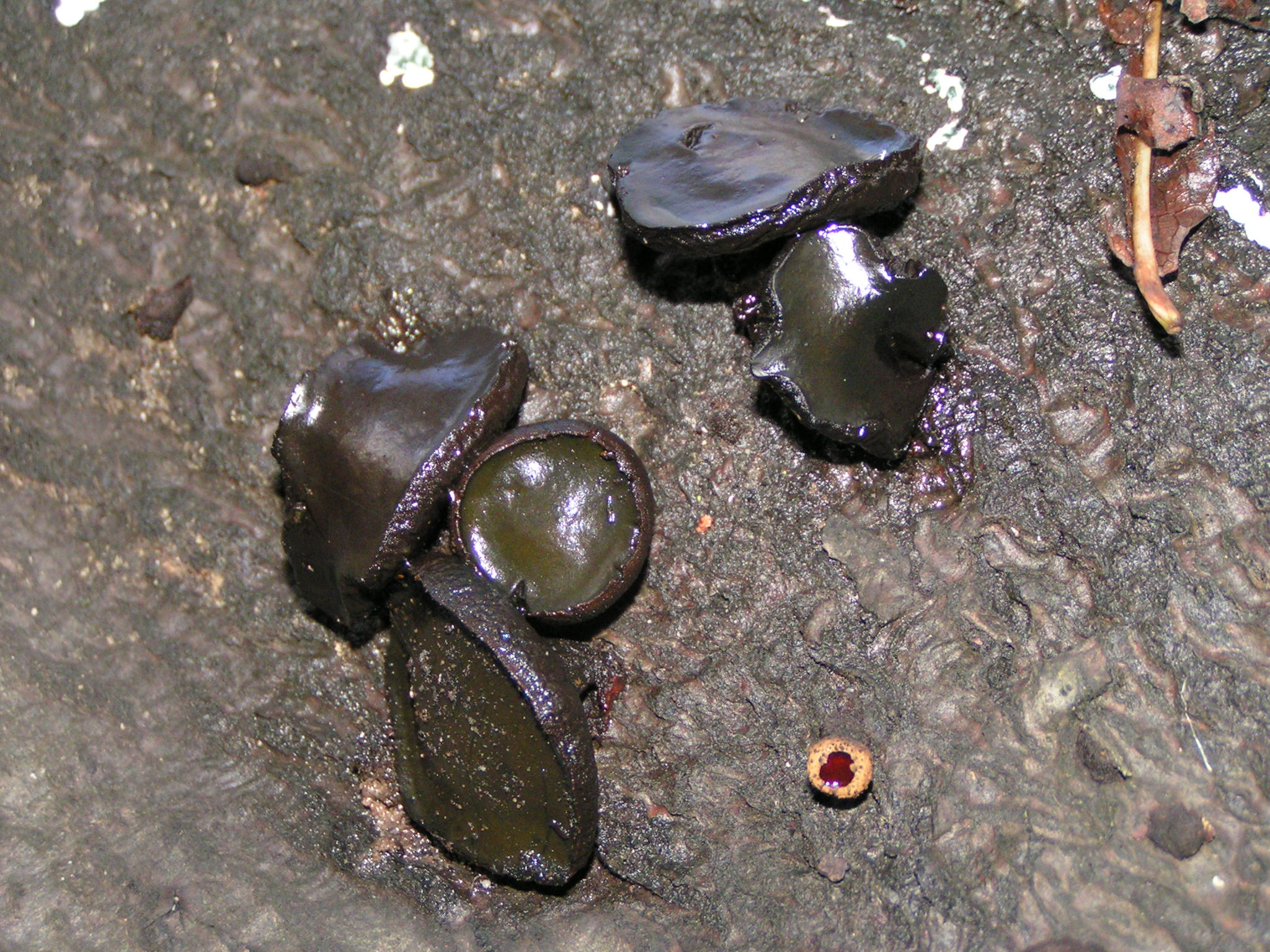
Bulgaria inquinans

== Habitat and distribution ==
Exidia truncata is a wood-rotting species, found on dead attached or recently fallen branches of oaks and may be confined to oak. It typically produces fruit bodies in winter. It is known from Europe and North Africa.
