= Rhyparomeris =

Scientific classification
- Kingdom: Animalia
- Phylum: Arthropoda
- Subphylum: Myriapoda
- Class: Diplopoda
- Order: Glomerida
- Family: Glomeridae
- Genus: Rhyparomeris; Ribaut, 1955
- Species: R. lineata

Binomial name
- Rhyparomeris lineata Ribaut, 1955

Genus of millipedes

Rhyparomeris is a cave-dwelling monotypic genus of pill millipede found in northeast Spain. The only species is Rhyparomeris lineata.

== Description ==
The dorsal surface of the head and tergites of Rhyparomeris millipedes are covered with small, flattened granulations formed by coagulated secretions and short, soft hairs. They have 11 tergites. Their telopods resemble those found in the Hyleoglomeris genus. Rhyparomeris millipedes are blind.
