= Geoglomeris subterranea =

Scientific classification
- Domain: Eukaryota
- Kingdom: Animalia
- Phylum: Arthropoda
- Subphylum: Myriapoda
- Class: Diplopoda
- Order: Glomerida
- Family: Glomeridae
- Genus: Geoglomeris
- Species: G. subterranea

Binomial name
- Geoglomeris subterranea Verhoeff, 1908

Species of many-legged arthropod

Geoglomeris subterranea is a species of myriapod belonging to the family Glomeridae.

It is native to Western Europe.
