= Rhopalomeris dinghushan =

Scientific classification
- Kingdom: Animalia
- Phylum: Arthropoda
- Subphylum: Myriapoda
- Class: Diplopoda
- Order: Glomerida
- Family: Glomeridae
- Genus: Rhopalomeris
- Species: R. dinghushan

Binomial name
- Rhopalomeris dinghushan Fan Z, Huang H, Zhang Z, Zhang L, Liu W, 2026

Species of pill millipede

Rhopalomeris dinghushan is a species of pill millipede that belongs to the family Glomeridae.

The species was named after the locality the species was discovered in, the Dinghu Mountains located in Guangdong, Southern China.

== Description ==
It has a relatively large body compared to other species of the same genus with it ranging in length from 15.0–21.0 mm. The body is a vivid blackish-brown with distinctive marbled paramedian spots covering it. These spots have a yellowish-brown color. Its legs are long and slender.
