= Spelaeoglomeris =

Scientific classification
- Kingdom: Animalia
- Phylum: Arthropoda
- Subphylum: Myriapoda
- Class: Diplopoda
- Order: Glomerida
- Family: Glomeridae
- Genus: Spelaeoglomeris; Silvestri, 1908

Genus of millipedes

Spelaeoglomeris is a genus of pill millipede found in France and Spain.

== Description ==
Spelaeoglomeris millipedes are approximately 4-7 mm long with 11 tergites. They are blind and possess an organ of Tömösváry. The seventh antennae segment in Spelaeoglomeris millipedes is unusually short, less than one third the length of the second antennae segment.

== Species ==
- Spelaeoglomeris alpina Brölemann, 1913
- Spelaeoglomeris andreinii Silvestri, 1922
- Spelaeoglomeris doderoi Silvestri, 1908
- Spelaeoglomeris hispanica Brölemann, 1913
- Spelaeoglomeris jeanneli Brölemann, 1913
- Spelaeoglomeris racovitzae Silvestri, 1908
