= Schismaglomeris =

Scientific classification
- Kingdom: Animalia
- Phylum: Arthropoda
- Subphylum: Myriapoda
- Class: Diplopoda
- Order: Glomerida
- Family: Glomeridae
- Genus: Schismaglomeris; Verhoeff, 1909
- Species: S. occultocolorata

Binomial name
- Schismaglomeris occultocolorata (Verhoeff, 1892)

Genus of millipedes

Schismaglomeris is a genus of pill millipede found in Portugal. The genus is known only from Karl Wilhelm Verhoeff's original description. It is possibly a synonym of Haploglomeris. The genus currently contains only one known species, Schismaglomeris occultocolorata.

== Description ==
Male Schismaglomeris millipedes have well-developed, conical trichosteles on the prefemur and femur of their telopods, with those of the prefemora being particular long.
