= Simplomeris =

Scientific classification
- Kingdom: Animalia
- Phylum: Arthropoda
- Subphylum: Myriapoda
- Class: Diplopoda
- Order: Glomerida
- Family: Glomeridae
- Genus: Simplomeris; Verhoeff, 1936
- Species: S. montivaga

Binomial name
- Simplomeris montivaga (Faës, 1902)

Genus of millipedes

Simplomeris is a genus of pill millipede found in Switzerland. The genus is known only from Karl Wilhelm Verhoeff's original description. It is possibly a synonym of Haploglomeris. The genus contains only one known species, Simplomeris montivaga, of which there are three known color varieties.
