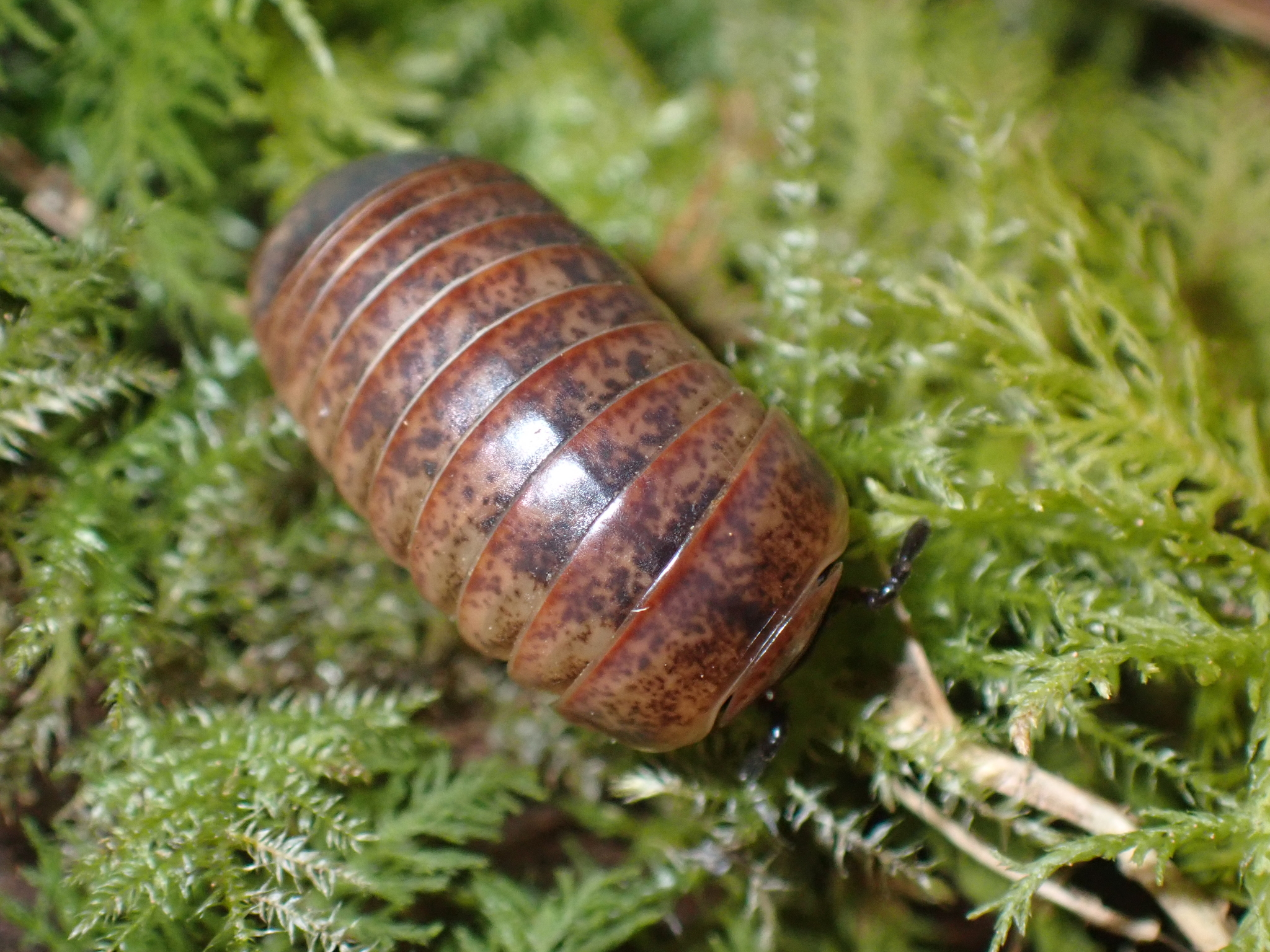

Scientific classification
- Kingdom: Animalia
- Phylum: Arthropoda
- Subphylum: Myriapoda
- Class: Diplopoda
- Order: Glomerida
- Family: Glomeridae
- Genus: Loboglomeris; Verhoeff, 1906

= Loboglomeris =

Genus of pill millipede

Loboglomeris is a genus of pill millipede found in northeastern Spain.

== Description ==
Loboglomeris millipedes are vividly colored and large, with a body length typically exceeding 18 mm.

Males possess a stridulation organ on the posterior side of their telopods and at the inner margin of the anal shield. The posterior edge of the anal shield lacks grooves. The posterior slope of the synxocite is steep and divided from the preanal field by a deep, fold-like pocket. There is a large internal process on the femur of the gonopods. The 17th leg pair is slightly smaller than the adjacent walking leg pairs, with 2-segmented tarsi and typical claw structures.

== Species ==
- Loboglomeris haasi Attems, 1927
- Loboglomeris pyrenaica (Latzel, 1886)
- Loboglomeris rugifera (Verhoeff, 1906)
