= Onychoglomeris =

Scientific classification
- Kingdom: Animalia
- Phylum: Arthropoda
- Subphylum: Myriapoda
- Class: Diplopoda
- Order: Glomerida
- Family: Glomeridae
- Genus: Onychoglomeris; Verhoeff, 1906

Type species
- Glomeris tyrolensis Latzel, 1884

Genus of millipedes

Onychoglomeris is a genus of pill millipede found in North Italy and the Balkans. In 1971, Onychoglomeris tyrolensis, then Glomeris tyrolensis, was designated as the genus's type species.

== Description ==
Onychoglomeris range in coloration from whitish to brownish and lack a defined color pattern. The first and second male telopods lack trichosteles. The second telopod segment bears a large lobe-like projection, forming a pincer-like chela with segments three and four. Leg pair 17 consists of six podomeres with spiracles. The genus may contain the largest species of the order, which is 20-25 mm in length.

== Species ==
- Onychoglomeris australis Attems, 1935
- Onychoglomeris castanea (Risso, 1826)
- Onychoglomeris fagi Verhoeff, 1930
- Onychoglomeris ferraniensis Verhoeff, 1909
- Onychoglomeris media Attems, 1935
- Onychoglomeris tyrolensis (Latzel, 1884)
