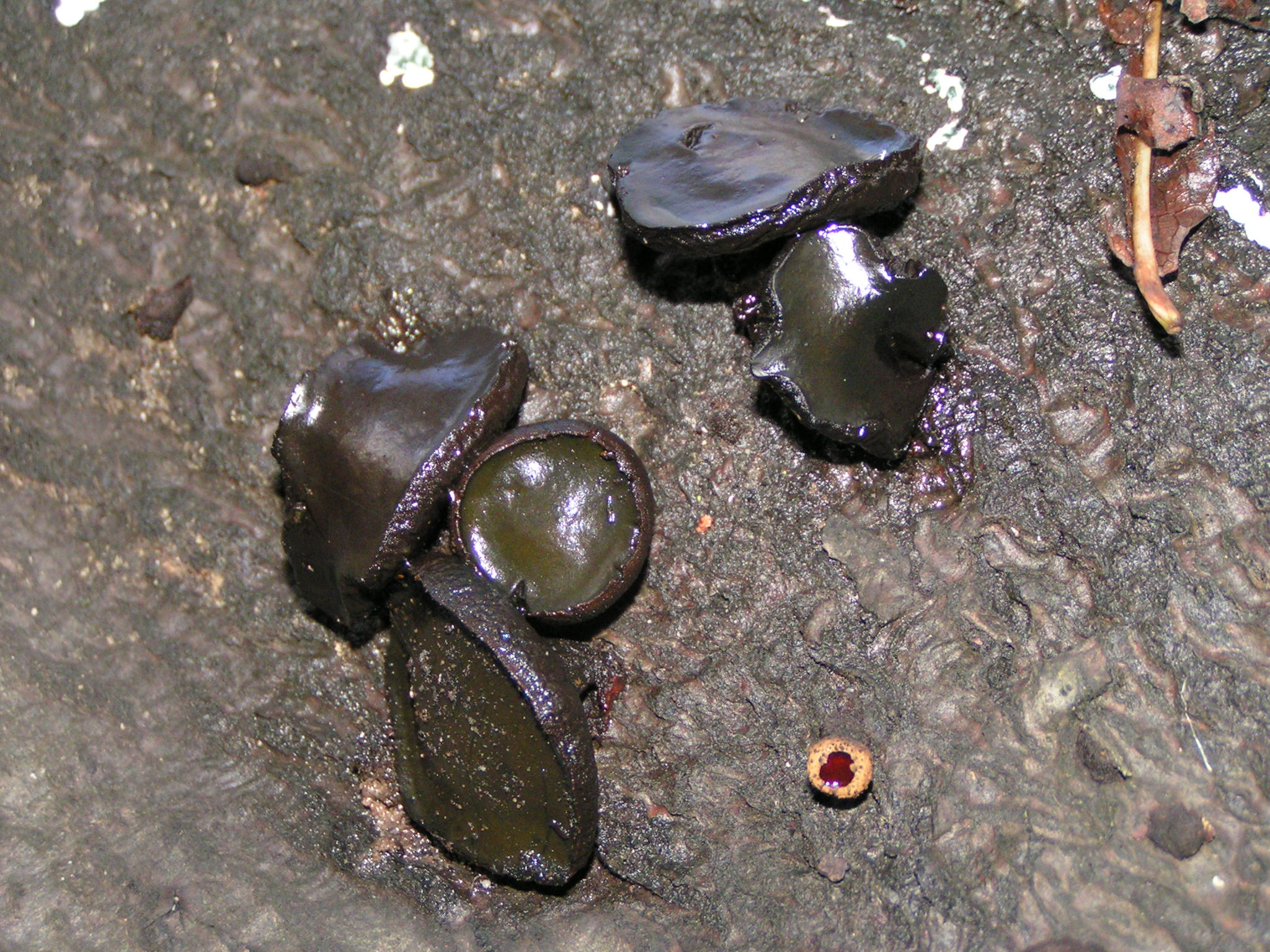

Scientific classification
- Kingdom: Fungi
- Division: Ascomycota
- Class: Leotiomycetes
- Order: Phacidiales
- Family: Phacidiaceae
- Genus: Bulgaria
- Species: B. inquinans

Binomial name
- Bulgaria inquinans (Pers.) Fr. (1822)

Synonyms
- Peziza inquinans Pers. (1794)

= Bulgaria inquinans =

Species of fungus

Bulgaria inquinans Mycological characteristics
- Cap is depressed
- Hymenium attachment is not applicable
- Lacks a stipe
- Spore print is blackish-brown
- Ecology is saprotrophic
- Edibility is inedible

Bulgaria inquinans is a fungus in the family Phacidiaceae. It is commonly known by the names poor man's licorice, black bulgar and black jelly drops.

It grows on dead trees including oak, hornbeam, and ash, in Europe and North America.

== Description ==
The cap is generally between 0.5 and 4 centimetres (1/4 and 1 1/2 in) wide and 1 cm tall. It has a dark top with a brown outer surface when young, later becoming more cupped with the black top widening over much of the exterior surface. The texture of the mushroom is similar to leather or elastic, depending on dry weather (elastic like), or wet weather (leather).

=== Similar species ===
Similar species include Ascocoryne sarcoides and Exidia glandulosa. Pseudoplectania species form black cups without a rough brown outer surface. Galiella rufa has a light upper surface and dark outer surface, opposite from young B. inquinans specimens. Exidia glandulosa and Neobulgaria pura are also vaguely similar.

== Distribution and habitat ==
The mushrooms generally grow in medium-sized clusters on the branches and bark of dead trees, generally oak and hornbeam, but also ash trees due to ash dieback disease. It can be commonly found on felled trees stored in timber yards. It grows across mainland Europe and in the British Isles. It also grows in parts of the United States, where it can be found from November to March on the West Coast and from May to October further east.

== Uses ==
Research into the colouring materials found in the fungus by H. Lockett and R. Edwards at Bradford University gave name to three purple pigments as two bulgarhodins and bulgarein.

The species is inedible.

== Gallery ==
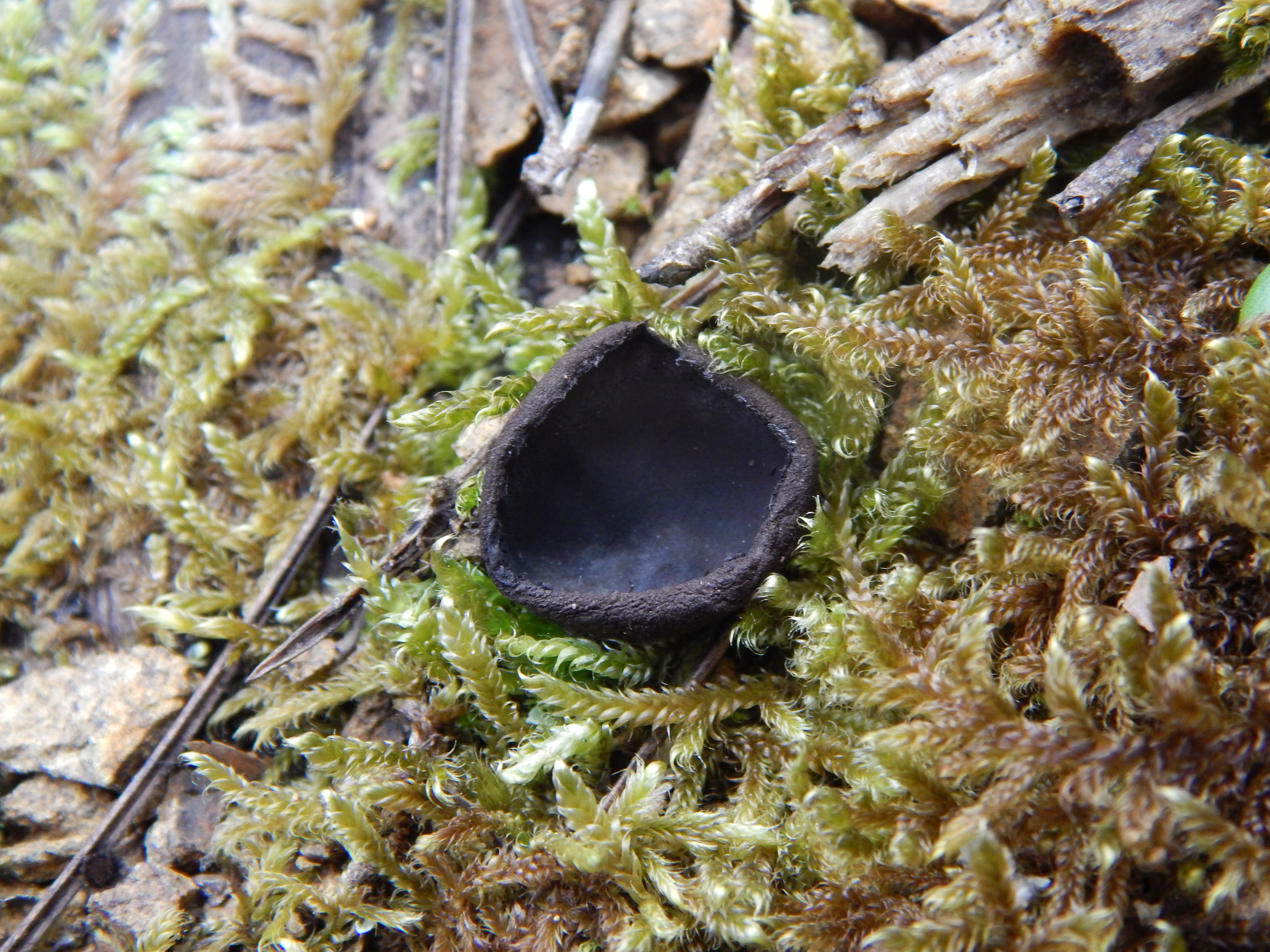

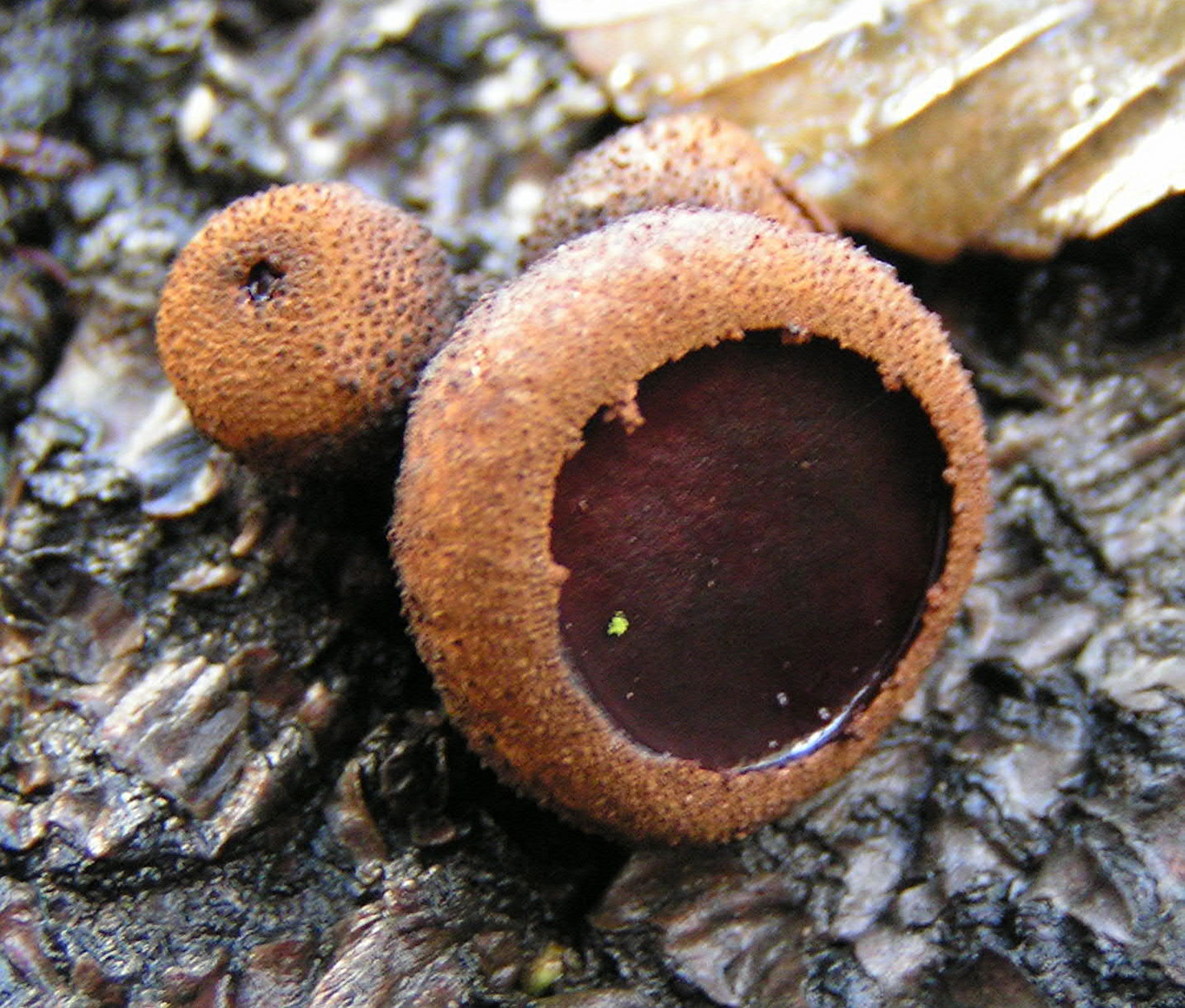
Young version

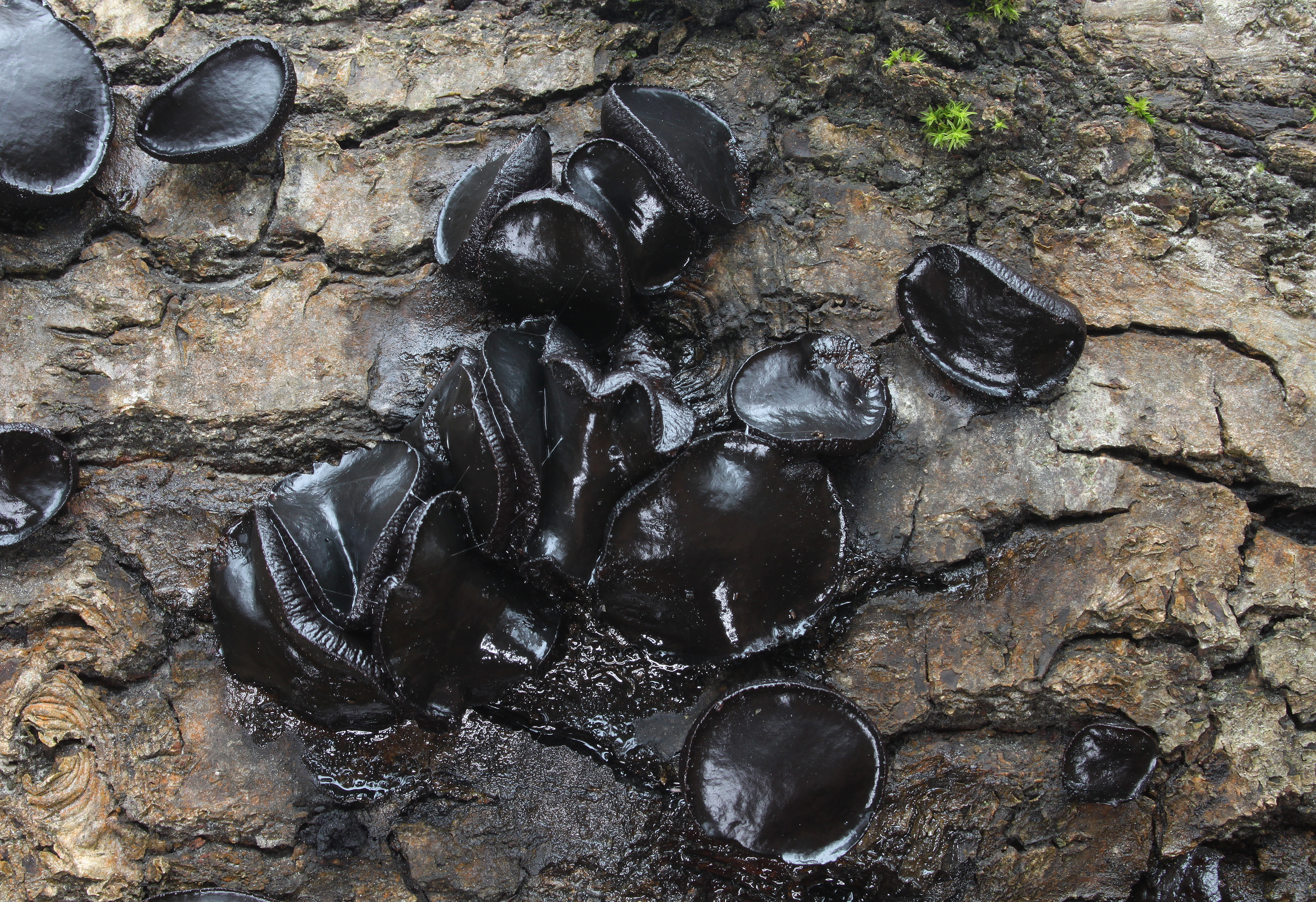

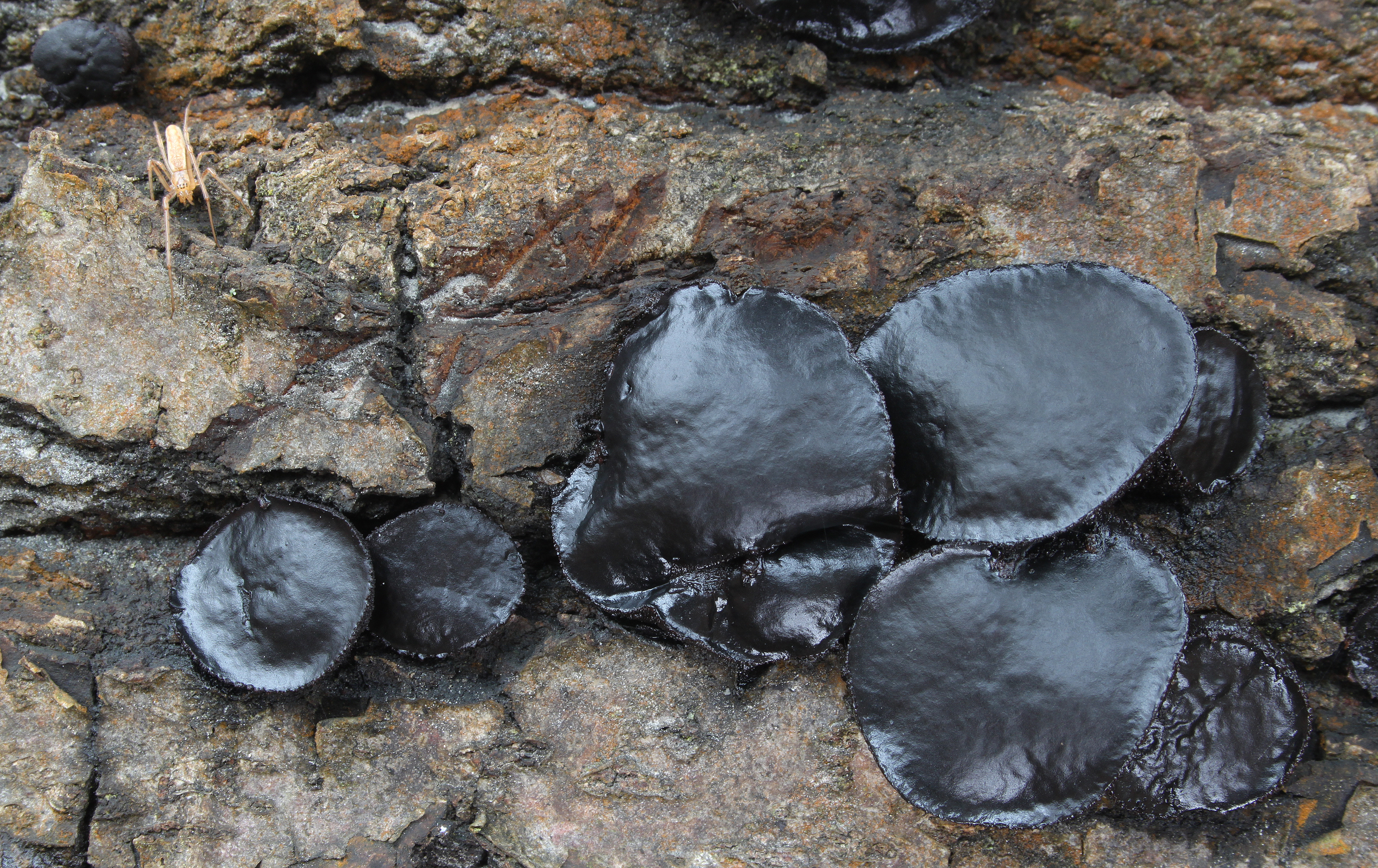

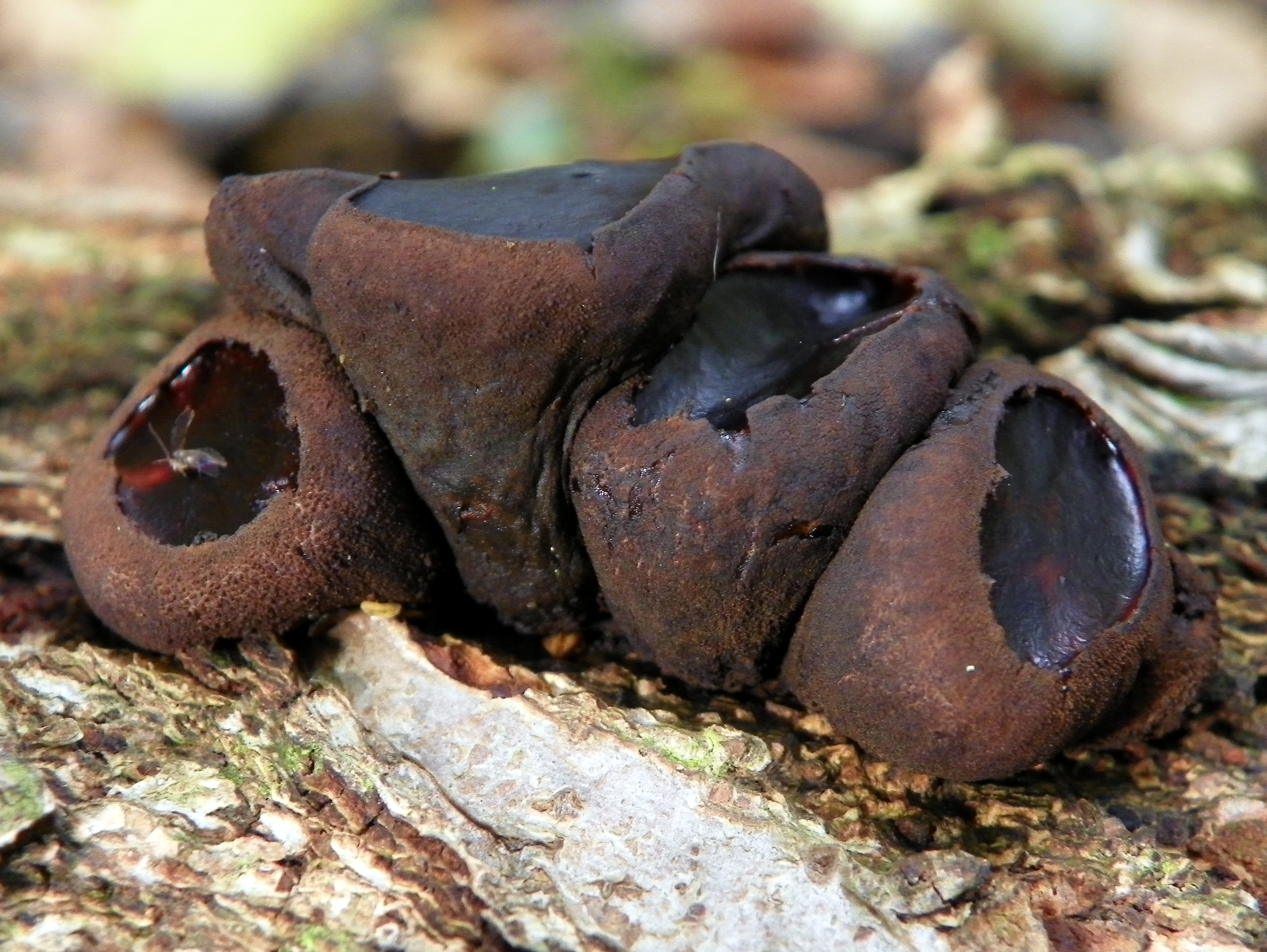
