= Apheromeris =

Scientific classification
- Kingdom: Animalia
- Phylum: Arthropoda
- Subphylum: Myriapoda
- Class: Diplopoda
- Order: Glomerida
- Family: Glomeridae
- Subfamily: Haploglomerinae
- Genus: Apheromeris; Silvestri, 1917

Genus of millipede

Apheromeris is a genus of pill millipede, originally considered a subgenus of Apiomeris. It is found in Java.

== Species ==
- Apheromeris partialis Silvestri, 1917
- Apheromeris parvella Silvestri, 1917
- Apheromeris totalis Silvestri, 1917
