= Geoglomeris =

Scientific classification
- Domain: Eukaryota
- Kingdom: Animalia
- Phylum: Arthropoda
- Subphylum: Myriapoda
- Class: Diplopoda
- Order: Glomerida
- Family: Glomeridae
- Genus: Geoglomeris; Verhoeff, 1908

Genus of millipedes

Geoglomeris is a genus of millipedes belonging to the family Glomeridae.

The species of this genus are found in Europe.

Species:

- Geoglomeris duboscqui (Brölemann, 1913)
- Geoglomeris etrusca Mauriès, 1984
- Geoglomeris granulosa (Ribaut, 1947)
- Geoglomeris pertosae Manfredi, 1953
- Geoglomeris pertosi (Manfredi, 1953)
- Geoglomeris provincialis (Brölemann, 1913)
- Geoglomeris subterranea Verhoeff, 1908
