= Starbaeckia =

Scientific classification
- Kingdom: Fungi
- Division: Ascomycota
- Class: Leotiomycetes
- Order: Phacidiales
- Family: Phacidiaceae
- Genus: Starbaeckia; Rehm ex Starbäck

Type species
- Starbaeckia pseudotryblidioides Rehm ex Starbäck

Genus of fungi

Starbaeckia is a genus of fungi in the Helotiales order and in the family Phacidiaceae. This is a monotypic genus, containing the single species Starbaeckia pseudotryblidioides.

The genus was circumscribed by Heinrich Simon Ludwig Friedrich Felix Rehm in Bih. Kongl. Svenska Vetensk.-Akad. Handl. 16(Afd. 3,3): Titelblatt, 3, 11. in 1890.

The genus name of Starbaeckia is in honour of Karl Starbäck (1863–1931), who was a Swedish botanist teacher, and member of parliament (the Riksdag, from 1902-1924). He was a doctor of philosophy in 1894 at Uppsala University and then he was also Professor of Natural Sciences and Chemistry between 1902-1928 in Gävle.
