= Strasseria mirabilis =

Scientific classification
- Kingdom: Animalia
- Phylum: Arthropoda
- Subphylum: Myriapoda
- Class: Diplopoda
- Order: Glomerida
- Family: Glomeridae
- Genus: Strasseria; Verhoeff, 1929
- Species: S. mirabilis

Binomial name
- Strasseria mirabilis Verhoeff, 1929

Genus of millipedes

Strasseria is a genus of pill millipede found in Slovenia. It currently contains only one known species, Strasseria mirabilis.

== Description ==
Strasseria millipedes are similar in appearance to those of the Trachysphaera genus, but lack any tubercles or papillae. They are approximately 4 mm in length and olive-greenish in color. They possess 11 free tergites, the posterior margin of which each possess a dirt-encrusted crest.
