= Mauriesia =

Scientific classification
- Kingdom: Animalia
- Phylum: Arthropoda
- Subphylum: Myriapoda
- Class: Diplopoda
- Order: Glomerida
- Family: Glomeridae
- Genus: Mauriesia; Golovatch, Mikhaljova & Chang, 2010
- Species: M. splendida

Binomial name
- Mauriesia splendida Golovatch, Mikhaljova & Chang, 2010

Genus of millipedes

Mauriesia is a genus of pill millipede found in Taiwan. The genus currently contains only one known species, Mauriesia splendida.

== Description ==
Mauriesia millipedes differ strikingly from those of the other three Glomeridae subfamilies due to the presence of a lobule on the mid-line of the anal shield and notably stout telopods in males.
