= Annameris =

Scientific classification
- Kingdom: Animalia
- Phylum: Arthropoda
- Subphylum: Myriapoda
- Class: Diplopoda
- Order: Glomerida
- Family: Glomeridae
- Subfamily: Haploglomerinae
- Genus: Annameris; Verhoeff, 1915

Genus of millipedes

Annameris is a genus of pill millipede of the family Glomeridae and the subfamily Haploglomerinae.

== Description ==
In Annameris millipedes, the sides of the thoracic shield are not thickened; the fore-tergite is not noticeably thicker than the rear lobe hind-tergite. The syncoxite, the fused base of coxae, has simple lobes.

The upper leg segment of male telopods (specialized legs for grasping females when mating) have short tubercules rather than a long conical spike. The femora has neither spikes nor are they expanded inward. The femur and tibia have a membranous flap pointed backward.

The top section of the antennal segments are nearly straight, widen abruptly at the basal third, then stay uniform with no bulbous swelling characteristic of other similar genera.

External palps of the gnathochilarium possess 18 sensory cones. The head capsule is slightly flattened behind the antennal sockets. Temporal organs are strongly elongated sideways, with no protruding corners on the head extending in front of them.

They have 11 eyes on each side of the head, with the single uppermost ocelli being round, while the others are horizontally oval. Neck lobes protrude slightly forward.

Annameris millipedes have more than ten continuous thoracic shield furrows. The tarsus of the walking legs are covered with numerous spiny bristles.

== Species ==
- Annameris curvimana Verhoeff, 1915
- Annameris robusta Verhoeff, 1920
