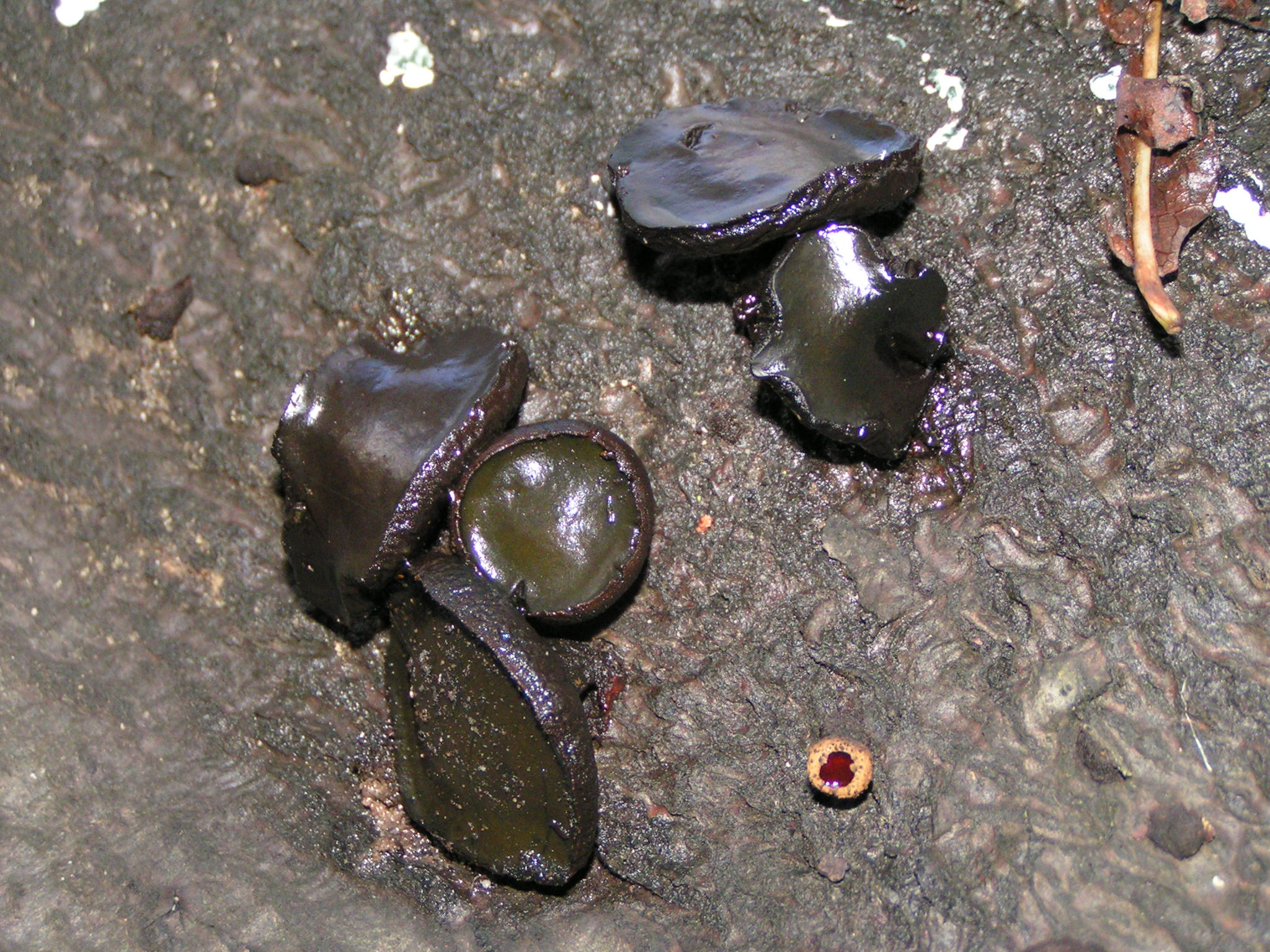
- Bulgaria inquinans

Scientific classification
- Kingdom: Fungi
- Division: Ascomycota
- Class: Leotiomycetes
- Order: Phacidiales
- Family: Phacidiaceae
- Genus: Bulgaria; Fr. (1822)

Type species
- Bulgaria inquinans (Pers.) Fr. (1822)

Synonyms
- Polymorphus Naumburg (1782); Burckhardia Schmidel ex Kuntze (1891); Voeltzkowiella Henn. (1908); Phaeobulgaria Seaver (1932)

= Bulgaria (fungus) =

Genus of fungi

Bulgaria is a genus of fungi in the family Phacidiaceae. The genus was circumscribed in 1822 by Elias Magnus Fries, with Bulgaria inquinans assigned as the type species.

== Species ==
- Bulgaria cyathiformis Henn. (1903)
- Bulgaria geralensis Henn. (1904)
- Bulgaria inquinans (Pers.) Fr. (1822)
- Bulgaria moelleriana Henn. (1902)
- Bulgaria prunicola Syd. & P.Syd. (1913)
- Bulgaria pusilla Syd. & P.Syd. (1910)
- Bulgaria sydowii Henn. (1898)
- Bulgaria turbinata Massee (1901)
- Bulgaria urnula Henn. (1901)
