= Hyperglomeris =

Scientific classification
- Kingdom: Animalia
- Phylum: Arthropoda
- Subphylum: Myriapoda
- Class: Diplopoda
- Order: Glomerida
- Family: Glomeridae
- Subfamily: Haploglomerinae
- Genus: Hyperglomeris; Silvestri, 1917

Genus of millipedes

Hyperglomeris is a genus of millipedes in the family Glomeridae.

== Species ==
- Hyperglomeris conspicua Golovatch, 1983
- Hyperglomeris depigmentata Golovatch, Geoffroy & VandenSpiegel, 2013
- Hyperglomeris dirupta (Silvestri, 1917)
- Hyperglomeris lamellosa Silvestri, 1917
- Hyperglomeris magna Golovatch, 1983
- Hyperglomeris maxima Golovatch, 1983
- Hyperglomeris nigra Golovatch, 2017
