= Epiromeris =

Scientific classification
- Kingdom: Animalia
- Phylum: Arthropoda
- Subphylum: Myriapoda
- Class: Diplopoda
- Order: Glomerida
- Family: Glomeridae
- Genus: Epiromeris; Strasser, 1976
- Species: E. aelleni

Binomial name
- Epiromeris aelleni Strasser, 1976

Genus of millipedes

Epiromeris is a genus of pill millipede of the family Glomeridae.

== Description ==
Epiromeris millipedes are medium-sized and pigmented, without dorsal markings. They possess eyes. Their body is composed of 12 free tergites, with the last two unfused. Their tergites have a rough, granular texture, and the surface is matte, without luster. The preanal shield has a straight back edge, though females possess a large bump in the middle, which distinguishes them from other similar species. Epiromeris is also distinguished by deep pits between body segments.

== Species ==
The Epiromeris genus currently contains only one known species.

- Epiromeris aelleni Strasser, 1976
