= Macedomeris =

Scientific classification
- Kingdom: Animalia
- Phylum: Arthropoda
- Subphylum: Myriapoda
- Class: Diplopoda
- Order: Glomerida
- Family: Glomeridae
- Genus: Macedomeris; Antić, 2021
- Species: M. ivoi

Binomial name
- Macedomeris ivoi Antić, 2021

Genus of millipedes

Macedomeris is a monotypic genus of pill millipede identified in North Macedonia, on the Balkan Peninsula. The only species is Macedomeris ivoi.

== Description ==
Macedomeris millipedes are distinguished from other Glomerida millipedes by several morphological features. Firstly, both sides of the thoracic shield possess deep lateral pits. Secondly, their tergites do not have any striking ornamentation. Thirdly, tergite 11 is fused with the anal shield. Lastly, Macedomeris millipedes lack a medial hump. Other distinguishing features include the presence of 2 to 3 vestigial ommatidia and, in males, an unusually wide syncoxite on leg-pair 17.

Macedomeris ivoi is presumed to be a cave-dwelling species.
