= Malayomeris =

Scientific classification
- Kingdom: Animalia
- Phylum: Arthropoda
- Subphylum: Myriapoda
- Class: Diplopoda
- Order: Glomerida
- Family: Glomeridae
- Genus: Malayomeris; Verhoeff, 1910
- Species: M. martensi

Binomial name
- Malayomeris martensi Verhoeff, 1910

Genus of millipedes

Malayomeris is a genus of pill millipede found in Sumatra. The genus currently only contains one species, Malayomeris martensi.

== Description ==
Malayomeris millipedes are dark brown in color without a distinct pattern. The thoracic shield possesses 10 or 11 striae, roughly half of which cross the dorsum. In males, the anal shield has two characteristic tubercules. Male telopods lack trichosteles, with the second and third segments fused to a strongly sclerotized, swollen process. The third and fourth segments form a pincer.
