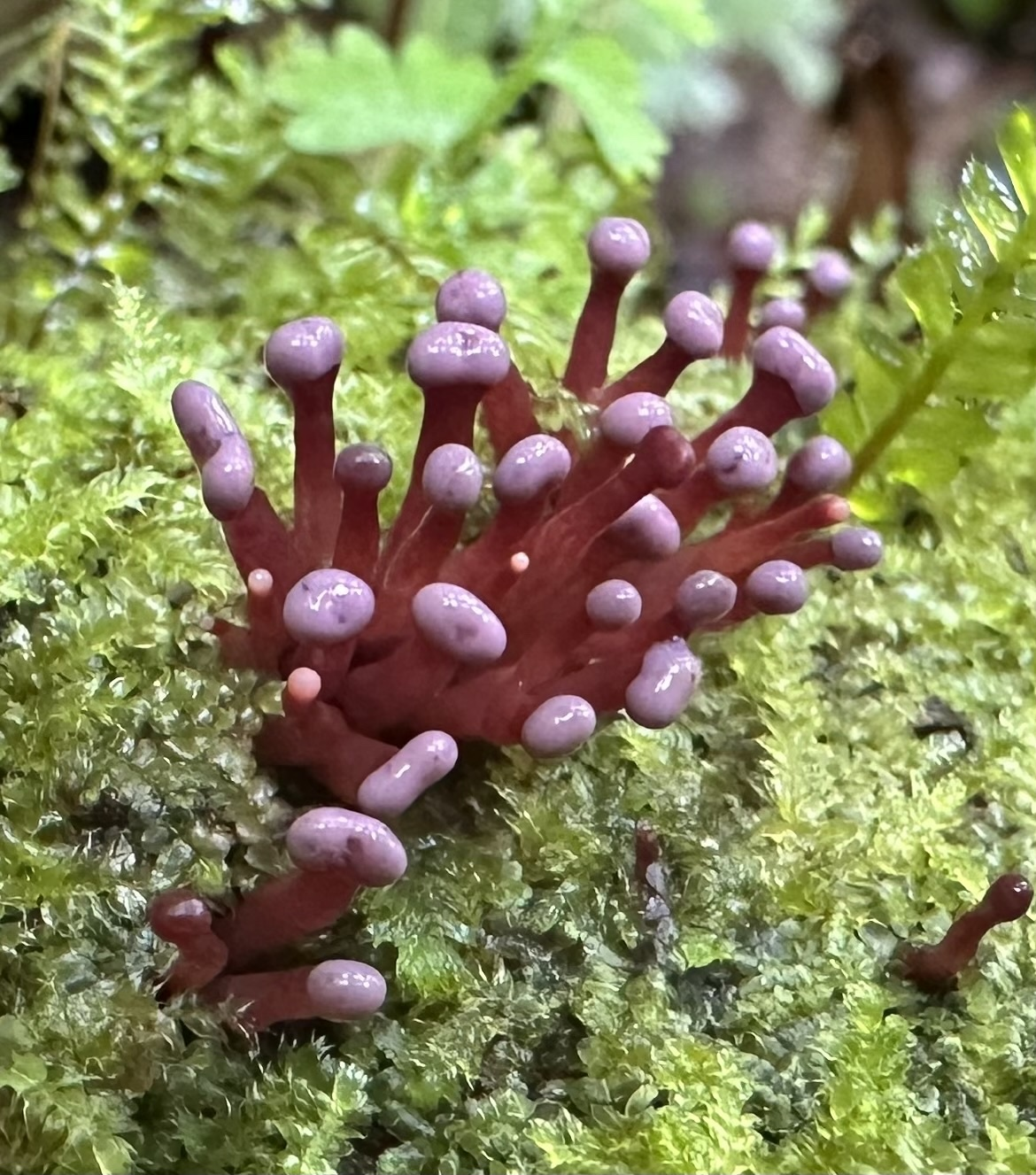
- Ascocoryne trichophora

Scientific classification
- Kingdom: Fungi
- Division: Ascomycota
- Class: Leotiomycetes
- Order: Helotiales
- Family: Helotiaceae
- Genus: Ascocoryne; J.W.Groves & D.E.Wilson (1967)

Type species
- Ascocoryne sarcoides (Jacq.) J.W.Groves & D.E.Wilson (1967)

Synonyms
- Ascocoryne J.W. Groves & D.E.Wilson, 1967

= Ascocoryne =

Genus of fungi

Ascocoryne is a genus of fungi in the family Gelatinodiscaceae. It was circumscribed in 1967 by James Walton Groves and Doreen Wilson to accommodate the sexual morph and to reserve Coryne for the asexual morph. Today, only one name is allowed for the whole fungus and Coryne is treated as a synonym of Ascocoryne.

== Species ==
As of January 2025, Index Fungorum recognizes the following species in the genus Ascocoryne.

- Ascocoryne albida (Berk.) Seifert (2014)
- Ascocoryne cylichnium (Tul.) Korf (1971)
- Ascocoryne javanica (Penz. & Sacc.) K.S. Thind & H. Singh (1972)
- Ascocoryne laurisilvae A. Mateos & De la Peña-Lastra (2024)
- Ascocoryne lilacina (Fr.) Baral, Helleman, Matočec, I. Kušan, Polhorský & E. Weber (2020)
- Ascocoryne sarcoides (Jacq.) J.W. Groves & D.E. Wilson (1967)
- Ascocoryne striata (Ellis & Everh.) V. Kučera & Lizoň (2005)
- Ascocoryne trichophora (A.L. Sm.) Seifert (2014)
- Ascocoryne turficola (Boud.) Korf (1971)
