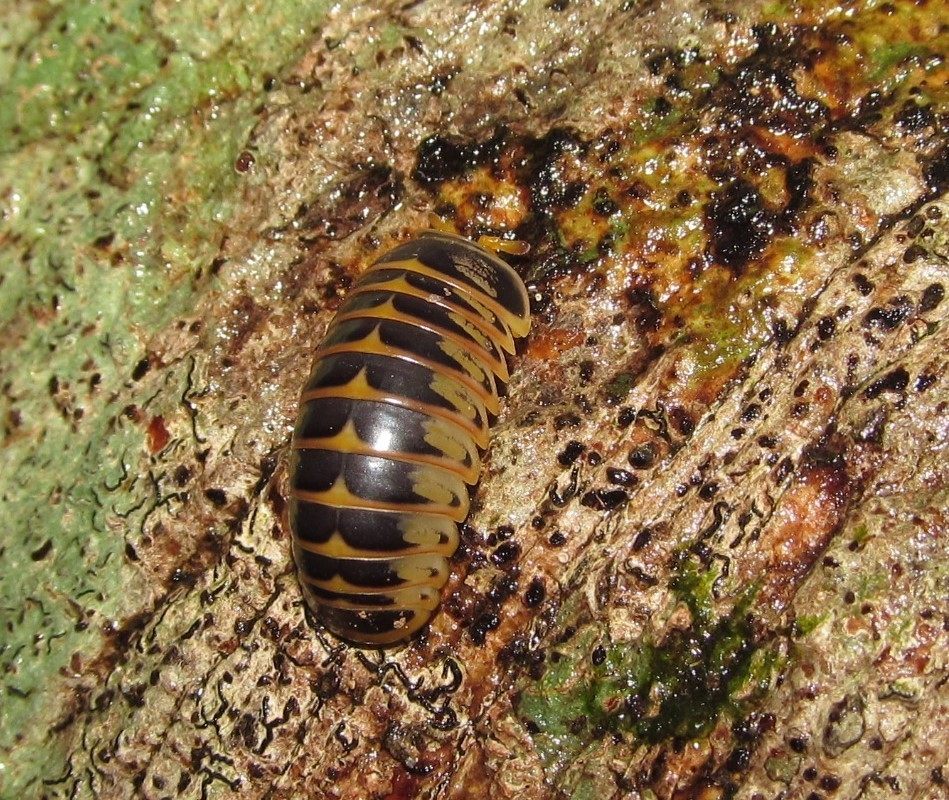
- Rhopalomeris sauda

Scientific classification
- Kingdom: Animalia
- Phylum: Arthropoda
- Subphylum: Myriapoda
- Class: Diplopoda
- Order: Glomerida
- Family: Glomeridae
- Genus: Rhopalomeris; Verhoeff, 1906

Species
- 8 (see text)

= Rhopalomeris =

Genus of millipedes

Rhopalomeris is a genus of pill millipede that belongs to the family Glomeridae. It found in Indochina.

== Description ==
Rhopalomeris millipedes have distinctive antennae, with the sixth segment being unusually enlarged, nearly as long as the 3rd through 5th segments combined. This sixth segment is club-shaped. Rhopalomeris millipedes have 13 smooth tergites.

Males have large telepodites on their 18th leg pair. This pair also possesses gonopods with stylus-shaped setae on the prefemur/femur. These gonopods also feature a strong inner femoral process, as well as femoral and tibial lobes extending into horn-like, curved, membranous processes. The tarsus is conspicuously curved backward, with the usual claw setae.

== Species ==
There are currently eight described species that belong to this genus. They are listed below:

- Rhopalomeris bicolor (Wood, 1865)
- Rhopalomeris dinghushan Fan Z, Huang H, Zhang Z, Zhang L, Liu W, 2026
- Rhopalomeris monacha Silvestri, 1917
- Rhopalomeris nagao A.D. Nguyen, S.G. Nguyen & Eguchi, 2021
- Rhopalomeris nigroflava Likhitrakarn, 2024
- Rhopalomeris sauda Nguyen, Sierwald & Marek, 2019
- Rhopalomeris tonkinensis Silvestri, 1917
- Rhopalomeris variegata Golovatch & Semenyuk, 2016
