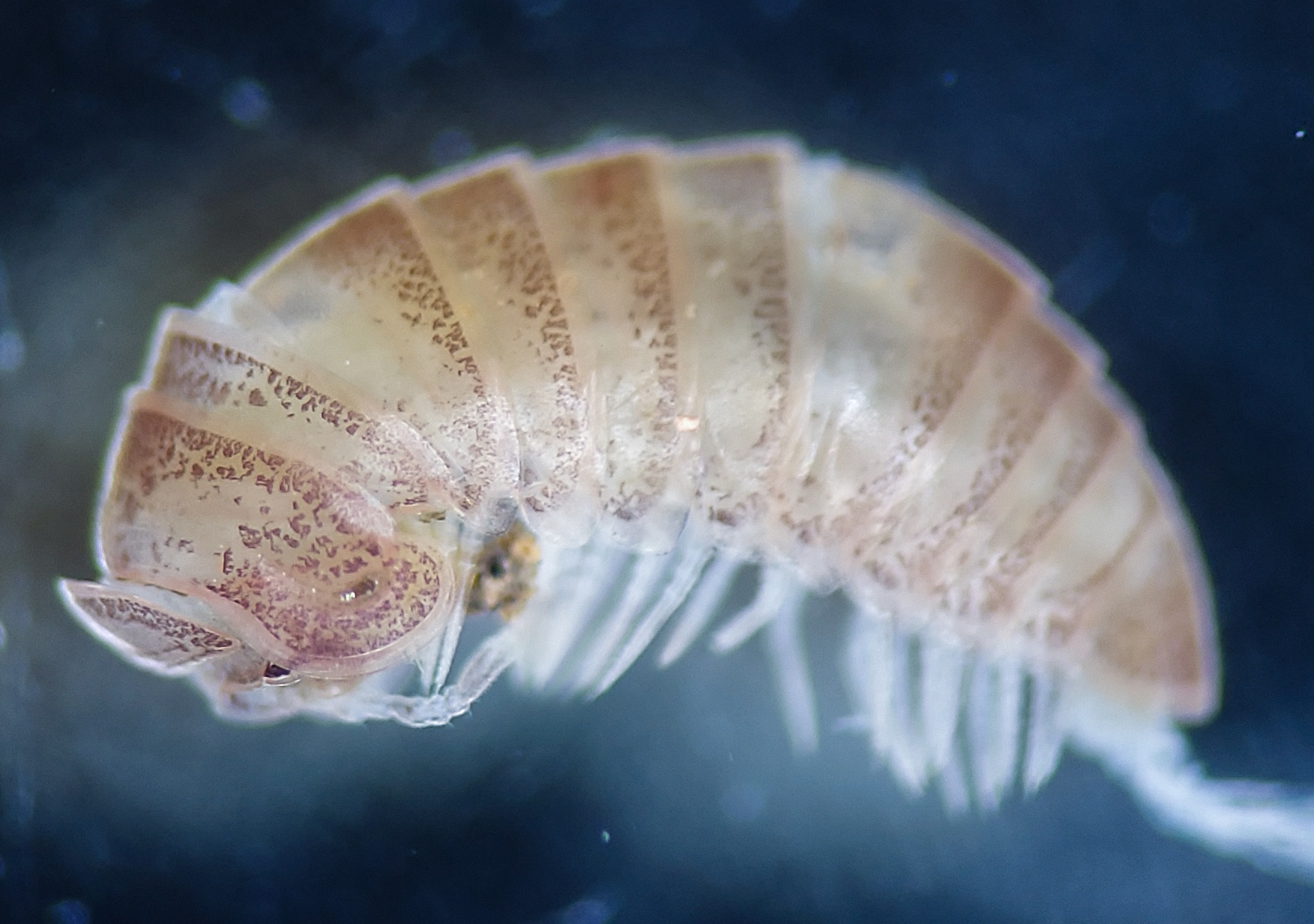

Scientific classification
- Kingdom: Animalia
- Phylum: Arthropoda
- Subphylum: Myriapoda
- Class: Diplopoda
- Order: Glomerida
- Family: Glomeridae
- Genus: Onomeris; Cook, 1896

= Onomeris =

Genus of millipedes

Onomeris is a genus of pill millipede found in the eastern United States. First described by Orator F. Cook in 1896, Onomeris was first posited as the type genus of a new family called Onomeridae, but this was later rejected due to similarities between Onomeris and the European genus Glomeris, another Glomeridae genus.

== Description ==
Onomeris millipedes are smaller than other Glomeridae genera, generally measuring less than 5 mm in body length, and 2 mm in width They are light grayish or brown in color, with darker posterior and lateral edges. Some specimens have pale lateral spots.

Onomeris millipede antennae are strongly genticulated, with the sixth joint folding against the third. These antennae extend from two deep pits near the median line to the single vertical row of eyes.

In males, the 17th pair of legs has only rudimentary joints and enlarged coxae.

== Species ==
- Onomeris australora Hoffman, 1950
- Onomeris sinuata (Loomis, 1943)
- Onomeris underwoodii Cook, 1896
