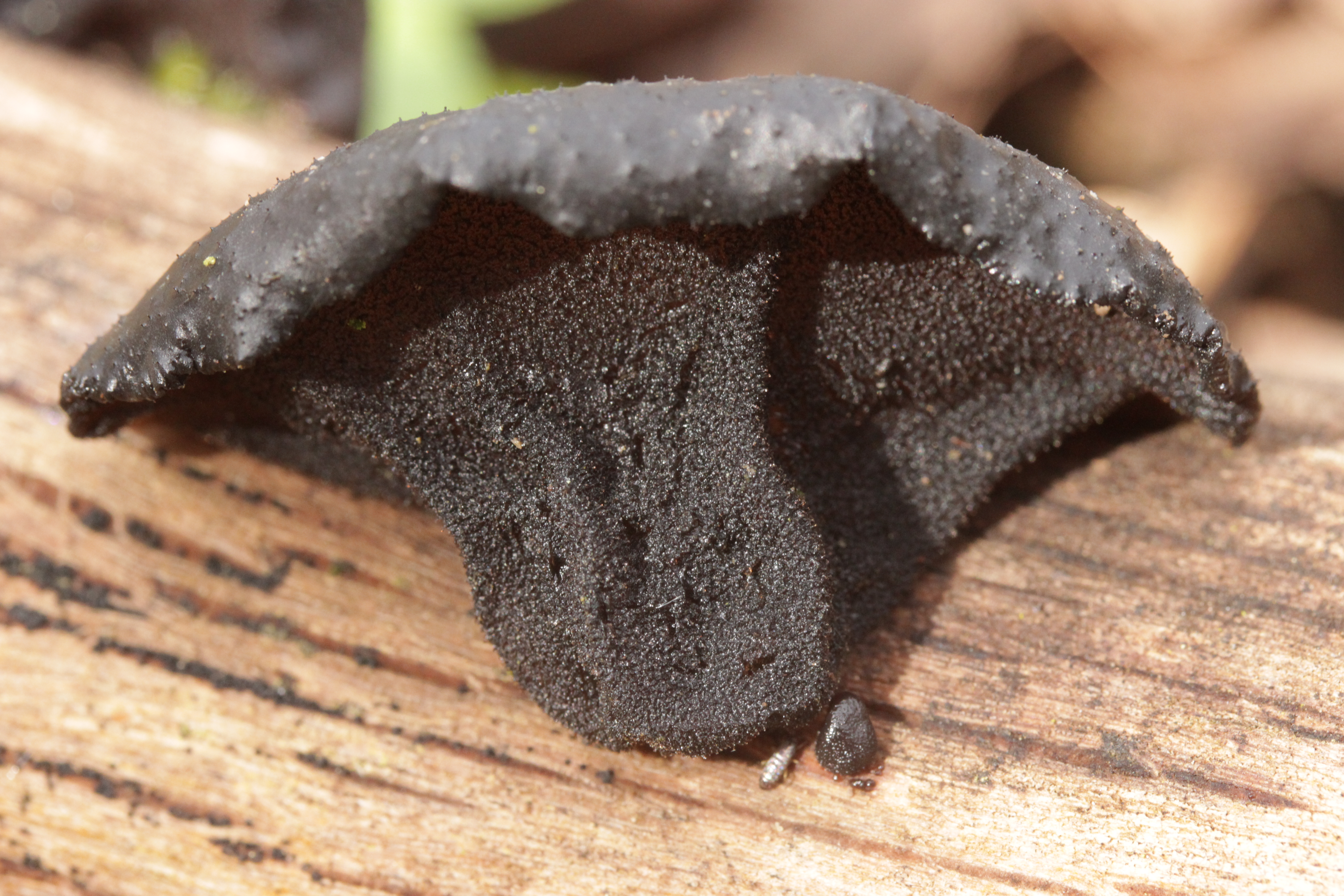

Conservation status
- Secure (NatureServe)

Scientific classification
- Kingdom: Fungi
- Division: Basidiomycota
- Class: Agaricomycetes
- Order: Auriculariales
- Family: Auriculariaceae
- Genus: Exidia
- Species: E. glandulosa

Binomial name
- Exidia glandulosa (Bull.) Fr. (1822)

Synonyms
- Tremella strigosa P. Karst. (1889); Exidia grambergii Neuhoff (1936)

= Exidia glandulosa =

Species of fungus

Exidia glandulosa is a species of fungus in the family Auriculariaceae. In the UK, it has the recommended English name of witch's butter. In North America it has variously been called black witches' butter, black jelly roll, or warty jelly fungus. The gelatinous basidiocarp (fruit bodies) are up to 5 cm (2.0 in) wide, brownish grey to black, and turbinate (top-shaped), growing singly or in groups.

It is a common wood-rotting species in Europe, growing on dead attached branches of oak and other broadleaf trees.

== Taxonomy ==
The species was originally described from France as Tremella glandulosa by Bulliard in 1789. It was subsequently placed in Exidia by Fries in 1822. Fries, however, modified Bulliard's species concept to include a second, effused, coalescing species—the name Exidia glandulosa serving for both. This combined concept was used until Neuhoff separated the two species in 1936. Unfortunately, Neuhoff gave the name Exidia glandulosa to the effused species, adopting the name Exidia truncata for Bulliard's original species. This error was pointed out by Donk in 1966, who proposed the name Exidia plana for the effused species (later replaced by Exidia nigricans, and now referred to Exidia pithya).

Recent molecular research, based on cladistic analysis of DNA sequences, has shown that two turbinate species occur in Europe: Exidia glandulosa, with a hirsute undersurface; and Exidia truncata, with a punctate undersurface.

== Description ==
Exidia glandulosa forms dark sepia to blackish, rubbery-gelatinous basidiocarps that are turbinate (top-shaped, like an inverted cone) and up to 5 cm (2.0 in) across. They are firm when fresh, but become lax and distorted with age or in wet weather. The fruit bodies occur singly or in small groups. The upper, spore-bearing surface is shiny and dotted with small pimples or pegs. The undersurface is hirsute, developing a dense covering of small, gelatinous spines. The spore print is white. When the fruit bodies are dried they can shrink to form a flattened black crust.

=== Microscopic characters ===
The microscopic characters are typical of the genus Exidia. The basidia are ellipsoid, septate, 15–25 by 9–13 μm. The spores are allantoid (sausage-shaped), 11–18 by 4–6.5 μm.

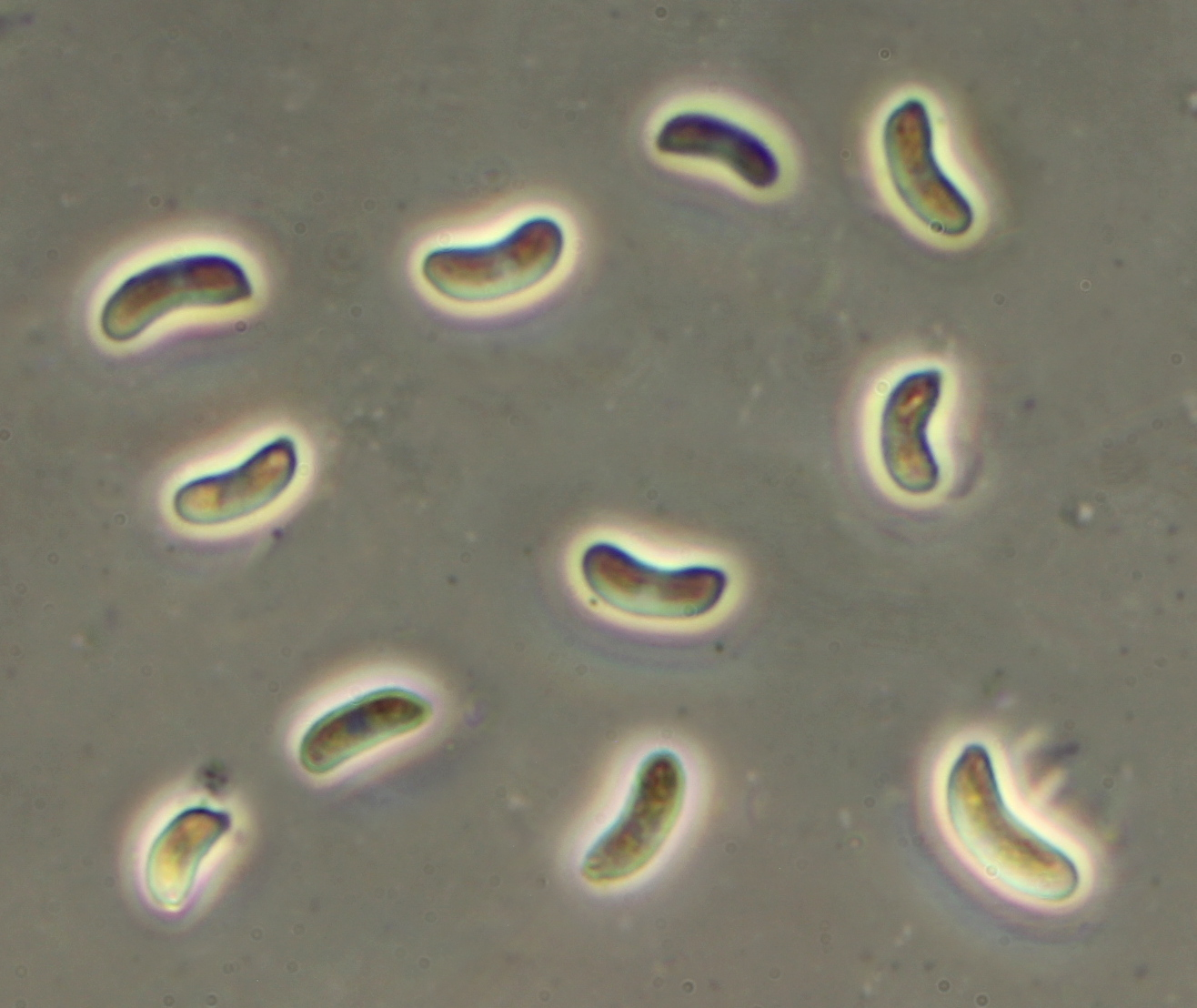
Spores

=== Similar species ===
Exidia truncata is very similar, but has a rough, punctate or pimply undersurface and (microscopically) slightly longer spores. Exidia pithya is also similar, but produces button-shaped fruit bodies that quickly coalesce, forming an effused, lobed mass that can be up to 30 cm (12 in) across.

The ascomycete Bulgaria inquinans forms similar, rubbery-gelatinous, blackish fruit bodies on oak. Their upper surfaces are entirely smooth, however, and they produce copious black (not white) spore prints, often leaving a black stain if wiped with the hand.

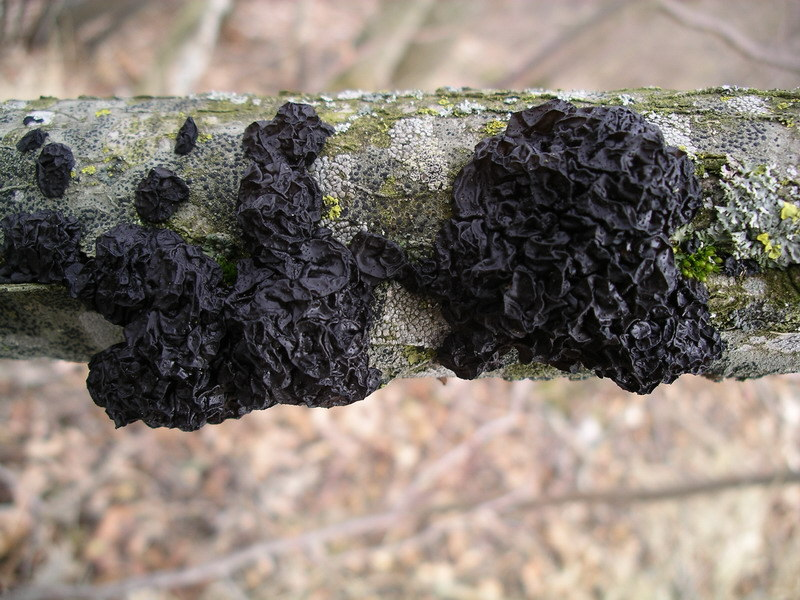
Exidia pithya

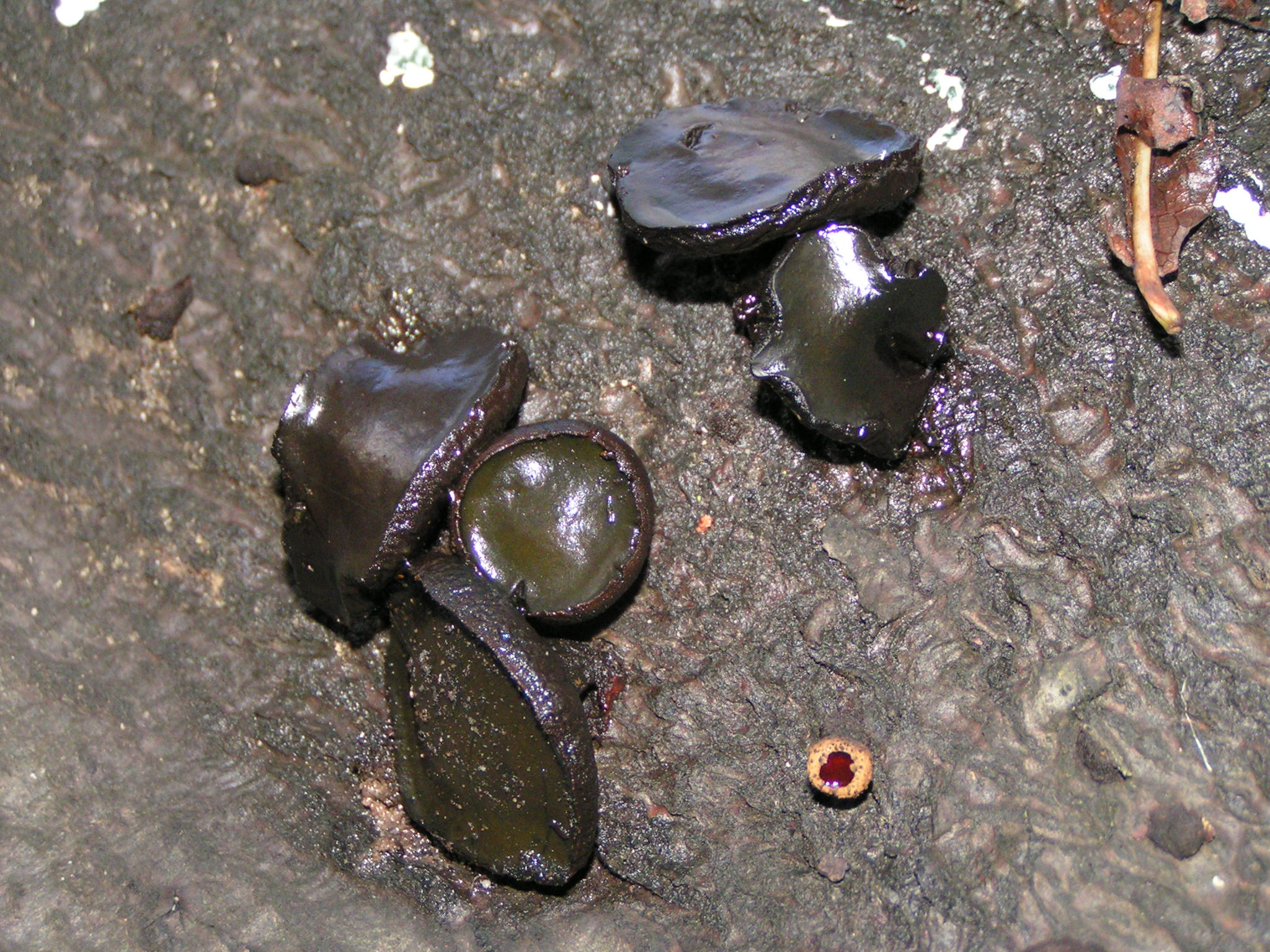
Bulgaria inquinans

== Habitat and distribution ==
Exidia glandulosa is a wood-rotting species, typically found on dead attached branches of broadleaf trees, especially oak, occasionally hazel, beech, alder, and other trees. It is a pioneer species capable of colonizing living or recently dead wood. A study of the wood decay process in attached oak branches showed that E. glandulosa is a member of a community of eight basidiomycetous fungi consistently associated with the decay of dying branches on living trees. Specifically, its role is to disintegrate the tissue of the vascular cambium, which loosens the attached bark. It persists for some while on fallen branches and logs. The fruit bodies are normally produced in the autumn.

Its global distribution outside of Europe is uncertain.

== Edibility ==
While nonpoisonous, one American field guide says E. glandulosa is inedible, though it has also been reported to be edible.
