= Haploglomeris =

Scientific classification
- Kingdom: Animalia
- Phylum: Arthropoda
- Subphylum: Myriapoda
- Class: Diplopoda
- Order: Glomerida
- Family: Glomeridae
- Subfamily: Haploglomerinae
- Genus: Haploglomeris; Verhoeff, 1906
- Species: H. multistriata

Binomial name
- Haploglomeris multistriata (C. L. Koch, 1844)

Synonyms
- Glomeris multistriata C. L. Koch, 1844

Genus of millipedes

Haploglomeris is a genus of pill millipede found in central Europe and the western Balkans. Currently, the genus contains only one known species, Haploglomeris multistriata.

== Description ==
Haploglomeris millipedes lack trichosteles on their first and second telopod segments.
