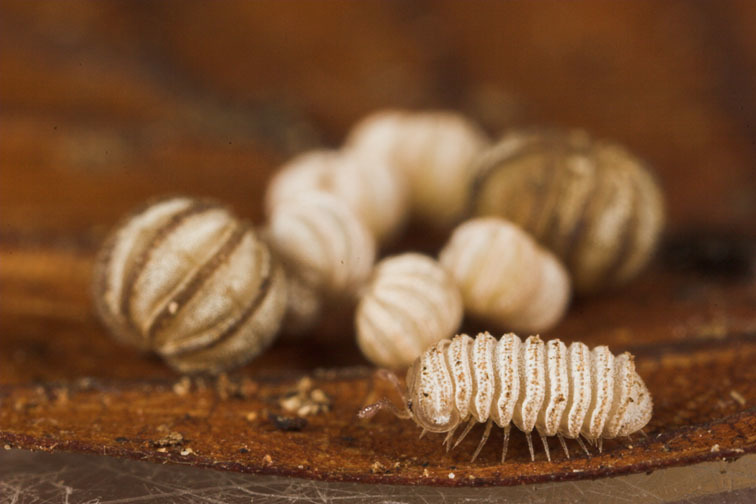
- Trachysphaera sp.
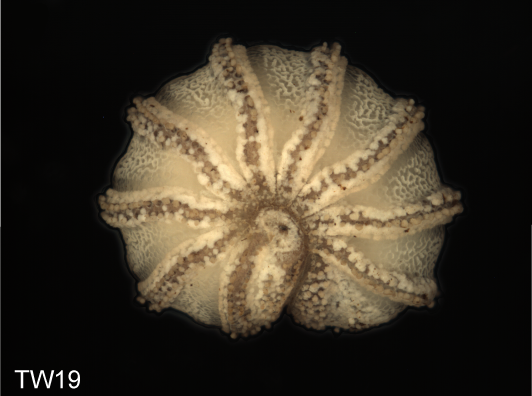
- Trachysphaera lobata

Scientific classification
- Kingdom: Animalia
- Phylum: Arthropoda
- Subphylum: Myriapoda
- Class: Diplopoda
- Order: Glomerida
- Family: Glomeridae
- Genus: Trachysphaera; Heller, 1858

Synonyms
- Gervaisia Waga, 1858; Gervaisicus Chamberlin, 1962; Gervaisiscus Chamberlin, 1962; Spelaeogervaisia Brölemann, 1914

= Trachysphaera =

Genus of millipedes

Trachysphaera is a genus of dwarf pill millipedes in the order Glomerida. Just over 30 species are known, making it the third most species-rich genus of Glomerida. Trachysphaera species are patchily distributed throughout Europe and western Asia, extending from Spain to Caucasia. Members of this genus are tiny, with modified appearances resembling that of calcareous stones.

== Description ==
Trachysphaera is a genus within the order Glomerida that is known for its distinctive morphology. The species belonging to Trachysphaera exhibit a whitish coloration and are generally small, with adult individuals measuring no more than 5 mm in length. One of the most striking characteristics of this genus is the presence of transverse ribs located in the posterior regions of the tergites. These ribs are adorned with unique coagulated structures that take the form of tubercles, papillae, and rods. Trachysphaera is one of the few glomerid genera possessing a deep lateral pit on both sides of the thoracic shield. These pits are notable features, although their function is currently unknown.

== Distribution ==
Trachysphaera is found across most of Europe. The genus has been documented in various European countries including France and Great Britain. In addition to its presence in Europe, Trachysphaera species have also been reported in specific regions of western Asia. These regions include Crimea, the Caucasus, Turkey, Israel, and Northwest Iran. The distribution of Trachysphaera species is not uniform, and their presence may be patchy and localized. Some species may have a wider distribution range, while others may be more narrowly endemic, being restricted to specific habitats or regions.

== Habitat ==
Trachysphaera possess a diverse habitat range, however a majority of species inhabit forest ecosystems. Additionally, some species are also known to occupy caves, with the genus containing multiple narrowly endemic troglofauna. Trachysphaera have also been discovered living within suburban areas, where they have adapted to life in anthropogenic landscapes.

== Species list ==
There are currently 33 species recognized:

- Trachysphaera anatolica Ceuca, 1975
- Trachysphaera apenninorum (Verhoeff, 1908)
- Trachysphaera biharica (Ceuca, 1961)
- Trachysphaera coiffaiti Strasser, 1974
- Trachysphaera corcyraea (Verhoeff, 1900)
- Trachysphaera costata (Waga, 1857)
- Trachysphaera cristangula (Attems, 1943)
- Trachysphaera dobrogica (Tabacaru, 1958)
- Trachysphaera drescoi (Condé & Demange, 1961)
- Trachysphaera fabbrii (Verhoeff, 1929)
- Trachysphaera fragilis Golovatch, 1976
- Trachysphaera gasparoi Strasser, 1981
- Trachysphaera gibbula (Latzel, 1884)
- Trachysphaera jonescui (Brölemann, 1914)
- Trachysphaera ligurina (Manfredi, 1953)
- Trachysphaera lobata (Ribaut, 1954)
- Trachysphaera lobotarsus (Attems, 1943)
- Trachysphaera minuta Golovatch, 1976
- Trachysphaera orghidani (Tabacaru, 1958)
- Trachysphaera orientalis Golovatch, 1976
- Trachysphaera ormeana (Verhoeff, 1930)
- Trachysphaera pigmentifera (Verhoeff, 1941)
- Trachysphaera pygidialis Golovatch, 1990
- Trachysphaera pyrenaica (Ribaut, 1907)
- Trachysphaera racovitzai (Tabacaru, 1960)
- Trachysphaera radiosa Lignau, 1911
- Trachysphaera ribauti (Condé & Demange, 1961)
- Trachysphaera rotundata Lignau, 1911
- Trachysphaera rousseti (Demange, 1959)
- Trachysphaera schmidtii Heller, 1858
- Trachysphaera solida Golovatch, 1976
- Trachysphaera spelaea (Tabacaru, 1960)
- Trachysphaera varallensis (Verhoeff, 1936)
