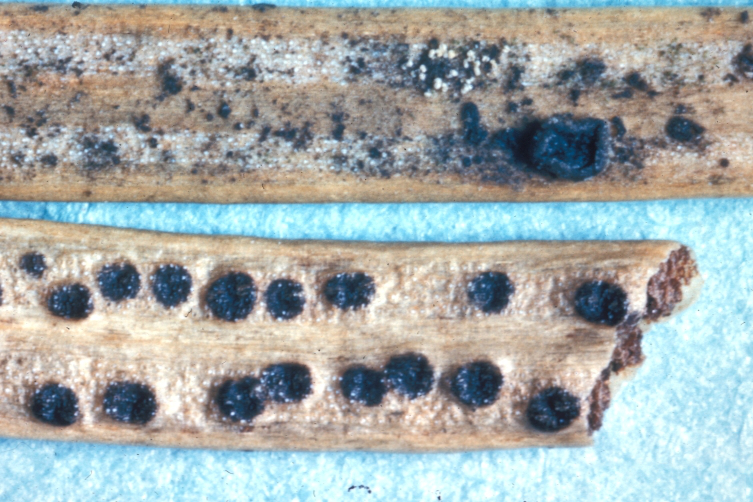
- Phacidium infestans on needles of Abies concolor

Scientific classification
- Kingdom: Fungi
- Division: Ascomycota
- Class: Leotiomycetes
- Order: Phacidiales
- Family: Phacidiaceae; Fr.

Genera
- See text

= Phacidiaceae =

Family of fungi

The Phacidiaceae are a family of fungi in the order Helotiales. According to a 2008 estimate, the family contained seven genera and 148 species.

== Genera ==
As accepted by GBIF;

- Allantophomopsiella Crous (1)
- Allantophomopsis Petrak, 1925 (5)
- Apostrasseria Nag Raj (1)
- Ascocoma H.J.Swart, 1987 (1)
- Bacilliformis (1)
- Basilocula (1)
- Bulgaria (9)
- Calvophomopsis (1)
- Ceuthospora Grev. (67)
- Chondrostroma (1)
- Coma Nag Raj & W.B.Kendrick, 1972 (1)
- Cornibusella (1)
- Darkera H.S.Whitney, J.Reid & Piroz. (7)
- Gloeopycnis (1)
- Leptoteichion (1)
- Melanostroma (2)
- Myxophacidium (1)
- Neonaumovia (1)
- Phacidiopycnis (6)
- Phacidites Meschinelli, 1892 (1)
- Phacidium Fr. (57)
- Potebniamyces (3)
- Pseudophacidium (11)
- Siroplaconema (1)
- Starbaeckia Rehm (1)
- Strasseria Bres. & Sacc. (13)

Figures in brackets are approx. how many species per genus.
