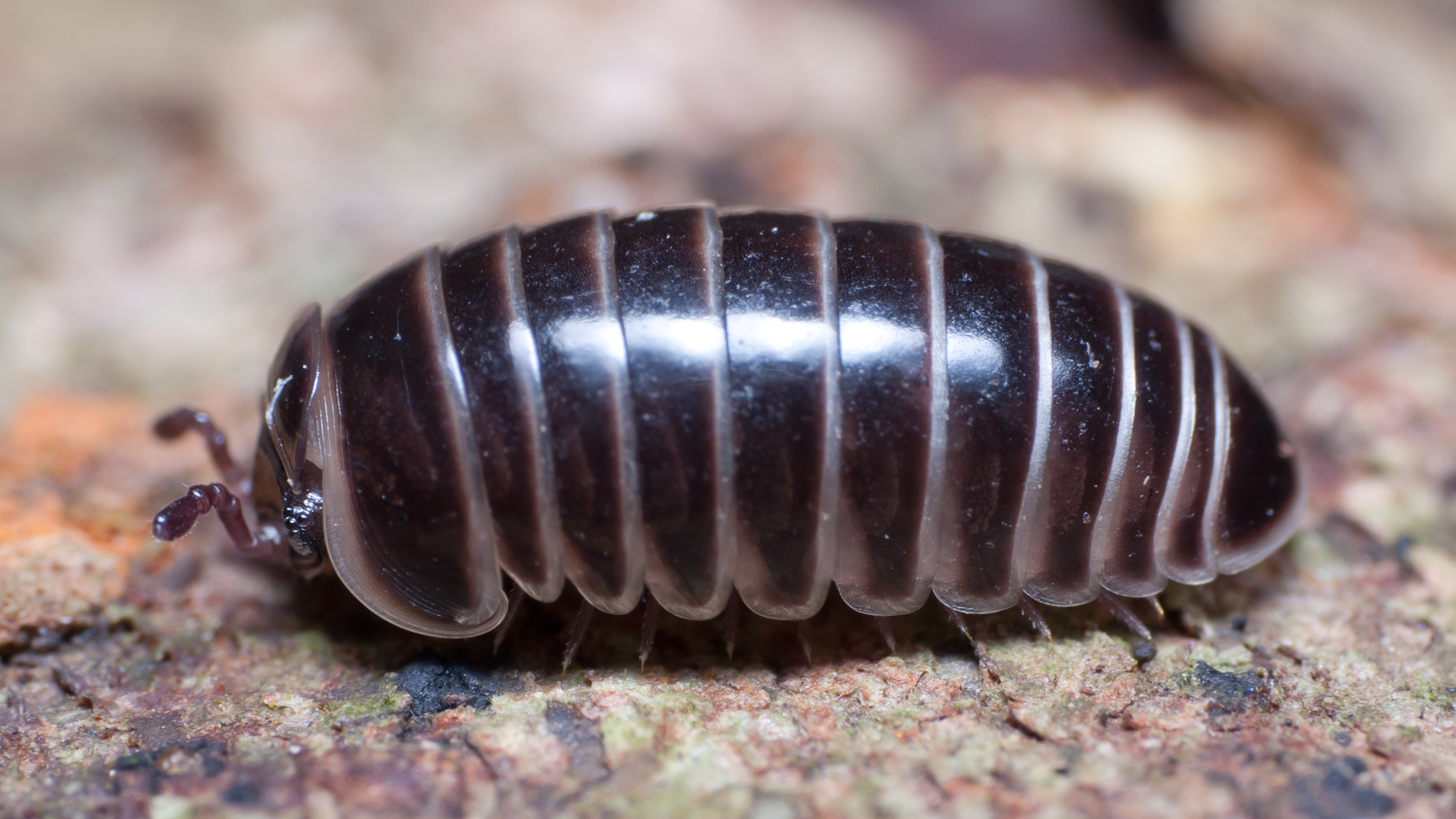

Scientific classification
- Kingdom: Animalia
- Phylum: Arthropoda
- Subphylum: Myriapoda
- Class: Diplopoda
- Order: Glomerida
- Family: Glomeridae
- Genus: Hyleoglomeris; Verhoeff, 1910

= Hyleoglomeris =

Genus of millipede

Hyleoglomeris is a genus of pill millipede with approximately 100 species widely distributed from Europe to East Asia. They typically dwell in warm-temperate to tropical climates, with at least two dozen species dwelling in caves.

== Description ==
Hyleoglomeris millipedes range in size from 5 to 16 mm in body length, with widely varying body coloration among species.

The genus can be distinguished from other Doderiinae genera by the presence of only four apical cones on the antennae, a higher number of striae on the thoracic shield, the presence of trichosteles (or bristle-like structures) on segments 1-3 of the male telopods, and a specialized apical outgrowth on telopoditomere 2.

== Species ==
- Hyleoglomeris albicollis Golovatch, 1983
- Hyleoglomeris albicornis (Pocock, 1894)
- Hyleoglomeris albicorporis Zhang & Zhang, 1995
- Hyleoglomeris alticola (Carl, 1912)
- Hyleoglomeris alutacea Mikhaljova & Lim, 2006
- Hyleoglomeris armeniaca Golovatch, 1989
- Hyleoglomeris aschnae Makhan, 2010
- Hyleoglomeris atricornis (Silvestri, 1917)
- Hyleoglomeris aurata Golovatch, Mikhaljova & Chang, 2010
- Hyleoglomeris aurea Likhitrakarn, Golovatch & Panha, 2015
- Hyleoglomeris awchasica (Brandt, 1840)
- Hyleoglomeris beccarii (Silvestri, 1917)
- Hyleoglomeris beroni Mauriès, 1984
- Hyleoglomeris bicolor (Wood, 1865)
- Hyleoglomeris bohaci Golovatch, 2015
- Hyleoglomeris bomba Likhitrakarn, Sutcharit & Panha, 2024
- Hyleoglomeris buana Mikhaljova & Lim, 2006
- Hyleoglomeris cattienensis Golovatch & Semenyuk, 2016
- Hyleoglomeris cavernicola Golovatch, Geoffroy & VandenSpiegel, 2013
- Hyleoglomeris colorata Golovatch, Geoffroy & VandenSpiegel, 2013
- Hyleoglomeris coloratoides Nguyen, Sierwald & Marek, 2019
- Hyleoglomeris confragosa Mikhaljova & Lim, 2006
- Hyleoglomeris contrasta Golovatch & Geoffroy, 2012
- Hyleoglomeris crassipes Golovatch, 1987
- Hyleoglomeris crebristriata (Silvestri, 1917)
- Hyleoglomeris cremea Golovatch, 1983
- Hyleoglomeris curtisulcata Golovatch, Liu & Geoffroy, 2012
- Hyleoglomeris differens Golovatch, Geoffroy & Mauriès, 2006
- Hyleoglomeris diversicolor (Silvestri, 1895)
- Hyleoglomeris dodongiensis Mikhaljova & Lim, 2018
- Hyleoglomeris dracosphaera Likhitrakarn, Sutcharit & Panha, 2024
- Hyleoglomeris electa (Silvestri, 1917)
- Hyleoglomeris emarginata Golovatch, 1981
- Hyleoglomeris epirotica (Mauriès, 1966)
- Hyleoglomeris eremita (Carl, 1912)
- Hyleoglomeris eusulcata Golovatch, Geoffroy & Mauriès, 2006
- Hyleoglomeris faberi Makarov, Ćurčić, Antić, Tomić, Ćurčić, Ilić & Lučić, 2013
- Hyleoglomeris fanxipan Nguyen, Eguchi & Hwang, 2019
- Hyleoglomeris fedorenkoi Golovatch, 2017
- Hyleoglomeris formosa (Silvestri, 1895)
- Hyleoglomeris fusca Golovatch & Geoffroy, 2012
- Hyleoglomeris gorkhalis Golovatch, 1987
- Hyleoglomeris gudu Golovatch, Liu & Geoffroy, 2012
- Hyleoglomeris heshang Golovatch, Liu & Geoffroy, 2012
- Hyleoglomeris hoanglien Nguyen, Eguchi & Hwang, 2019
- Hyleoglomeris hongkhraiensis Likhitrakarn, Golovatch & Panha, 2015
- Hyleoglomeris insularis Golovatch, 2013
- Hyleoglomeris insularum Verhoeff, 1936
- Hyleoglomeris jacobsoni (Silvestri, 1917)
- Hyleoglomeris japonica Verhoeff, 1936
- Hyleoglomeris kallipygos (Attems, 1907)
- Hyleoglomeris khumbua Golovatch, 1987
- Hyleoglomeris kirgisica Golovatch, 1976
- Hyleoglomeris kirropeza (Attems, 1897)
- Hyleoglomeris koreana Golovatch, 1978
- Hyleoglomeris krasoon Likhitrakarn, Sutcharit & Panha, 2024
- Hyleoglomeris kunnan Golovatch, Liu & Geoffroy, 2012
- Hyleoglomeris lamprus (Chamberlin, 1921)
- Hyleoglomeris lenkorana Golovatch, 1976
- Hyleoglomeris lii Golovatch, Liu & Geoffroy, 2012
- Hyleoglomeris lobus Nguyen, Sierwald & Marek, 2019
- Hyleoglomeris lohmanderi Golovatch, 1975
- Hyleoglomeris lucida Haga, 1956
- Hyleoglomeris maculata Golovatch, Geoffroy & Mauriès, 2006
- Hyleoglomeris magy Nakama, Nakamura, Tatsuta & Korsós, 2022
- Hyleoglomeris maior Attems, 1938
- Hyleoglomeris mashanorum Golovatch, Liu & Geoffroy, 2012
- Hyleoglomeris minuta Verhoeff, 1910
- Hyleoglomeris modesta (Silvestri, 1917)
- Hyleoglomeris modiglianii (Silvestri, 1895)
- Hyleoglomeris montana Golovatch, 1983
- Hyleoglomeris multilineata Verhoeff, 1910
- Hyleoglomeris mulunensis Golovatch, Liu & Geoffroy, 2012
- Hyleoglomeris nagarjunga Golovatch, 1987
- Hyleoglomeris nigra Verhoeff, 1942
- Hyleoglomeris nigromaculata Likhitrakarn, Sutcharit & Panha, 2024
- Hyleoglomeris nigu Golovatch, Liu & Geoffroy, 2012
- Hyleoglomeris obscura Lim, 2006
- Hyleoglomeris paucilineata (Silvestri, 1917)
- Hyleoglomeris piccola (Attems, 1899)
- Hyleoglomeris proximata Golovatch, Mikhaljova & Chang, 2010
- Hyleoglomeris pulchra Attems, 1953
- Hyleoglomeris qiyi Golovatch, Liu & Geoffroy, 2012
- Hyleoglomeris reducta Golovatch, Geoffroy & Mauriès, 2006
- Hyleoglomeris robusta Attems, 1938
- Hyleoglomeris sakamotoensis Takano, 1981
- Hyleoglomeris sarasinorum (Carl, 1912)
- Hyleoglomeris siamensis (Silvestri, 1917)
- Hyleoglomeris sinensis (Brölemann, 1896)
- Hyleoglomeris sinuata Golovatch, Mikhaljova & Chang, 2010
- Hyleoglomeris specialis Golovatch, 1989
- Hyleoglomeris spelaea Golovatch, Geoffroy & VandenSpiegel, 2013
- Hyleoglomeris speophila Golovatch, Geoffroy & Mauriès, 2006
- Hyleoglomeris stuxbergi (Attems, 1909)
- Hyleoglomeris subreducta Golovatch, 2013
- Hyleoglomeris sulcata Verhoeff, 1942
- Hyleoglomeris sulcostriata Golovatch, Geoffroy & Mauriès, 2006
- Hyleoglomeris suwannakhuhensis Likhitrakarn, Sutcharit & Panha, 2024
- Hyleoglomeris talasensis (Lohmander, 1939)
- Hyleoglomeris tiani Golovatch, Liu & Geoffroy, 2012
- Hyleoglomeris tinjurana Golovatch, 1987
- Hyleoglomeris tongkerdae Likhitrakarn, Sutcharit & Panha, 2024
- Hyleoglomeris translucida Golovatch, 2013
- Hyleoglomeris triangularis Haga, 1968
- Hyleoglomeris triangulifera Attems, 1938
- Hyleoglomeris uenoi Miyosi, 1955
- Hyleoglomeris unicolorata Mikhaljova & Lim, 2006
- Hyleoglomeris venustula (Silvestri, 1917)
- Hyleoglomeris vittata Verhoeff, 1929
- Hyleoglomeris wuse Golovatch, Liu & Geoffroy, 2012
- Hyleoglomeris xia Golovatch, Liu & Geoffroy, 2012
- Hyleoglomeris xueju Golovatch, Liu & Geoffroy, 2012
- Hyleoglomeris yamashinai Verhoeff, 1937
- Hyleoglomeris yinshi Golovatch, Liu & Geoffroy, 2012
- Hyleoglomeris youhao Golovatch, Liu & Geoffroy, 2012
- Hyleoglomeris zonifera (Silvestri, 1917)
