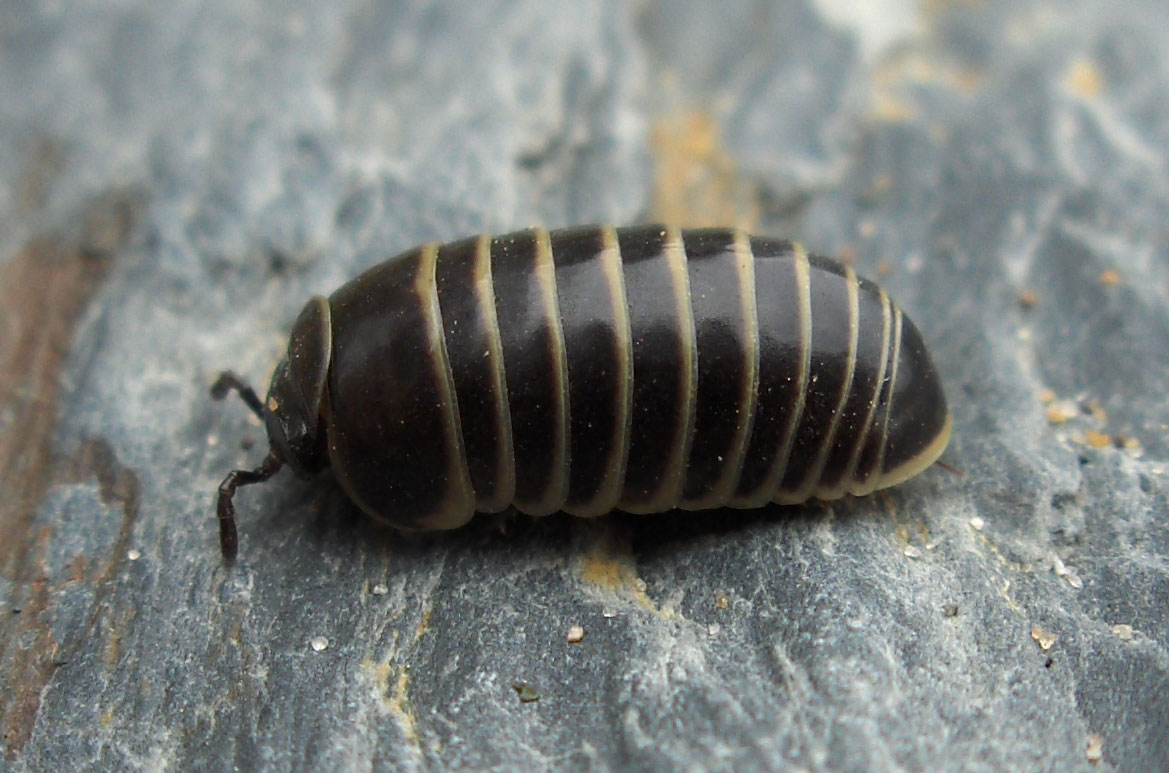
- Glomeris marginata

Scientific classification
- Kingdom: Animalia
- Phylum: Arthropoda
- Subphylum: Myriapoda
- Class: Diplopoda
- Order: Glomerida
- Superfamily: Glomeroidea
- Family: Glomeridae; Leach, 1815

Genera
- See text

Synonyms
- Onomeridae Cook, 1896; Onomerididae Cook, 1896

= Glomeridae =

Family of millipedes

Glomeridae is a family of pill millipedes in the order Glomerida. This family includes more than 300 species distributed among 30 genera. Many species in this family have not yet been described.

== Genera ==
This family includes at least the following genera distributed among four subfamilies:

Subfamily Doderiinae

- Adenomeris
- Doderia
- Epiromeris
- Geoglomeris
- Hyleoglomeris
- Macedomeris
- Nearctomeris
- Onomeris
- Rhopalomeris
- Rhyparomeris
- Spelaeoglomeris
- Strasseria
- Tectosphaera
- Trachysphaera

Subfamily Glomerinae

- Cantabromeris
- Glomeris
- Loboglomeris
- Onychoglomeris

Subfamily Haploglomerinae

- Annameris
- Apheromeris
- Apiomeris
- Haploglomeris
- Hyperglomeris
- Malayomeris
- Peplomeris
- Schismaglomeris
- Simplomeris

Subfamily Mauriesiinae

- Mauriesia
