= Organ of Tömösváry =

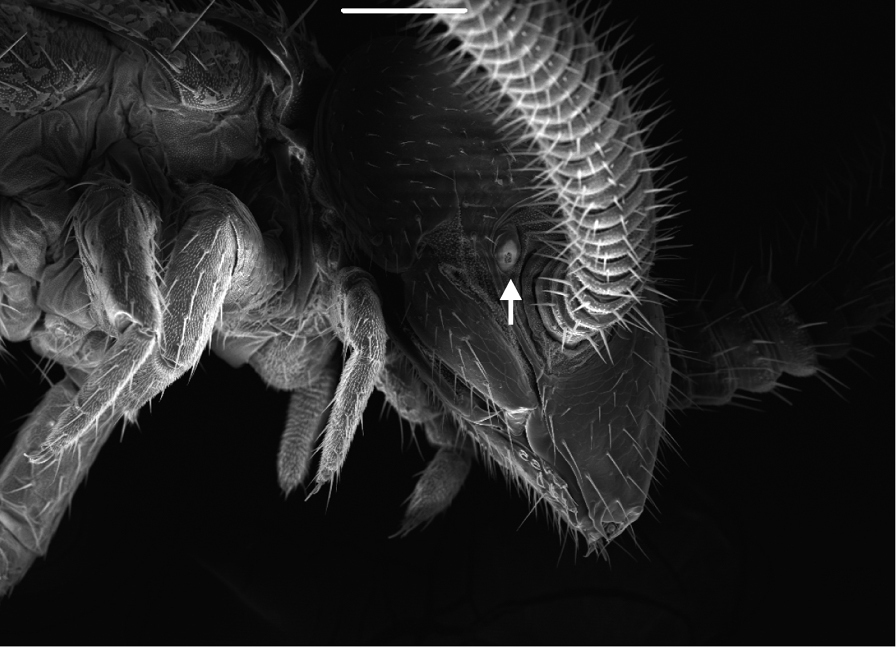
Tömösváry organ (arrow) on the head of a symphylan, just behind the base of an antenna

Tömösváry organs, also known as temporal organs or postantennal organs are specialized paired sensory organs found in certain groups of myriapods (e.g. centipedes and millipedes) and hexapods (e.g. springtails), located on the head near the base of the antennae. They are notably absent among Polydesmid (flat-backed millipedes), the largest order of Diplopoda. Various functions for the Tömösváry organs have been proposed, including sensing vibration, humidity, or light, although evidence for their true function is conflicting, and in groups such as millipedes its true function is unknown. The organs were first described by Hungarian biologist Ödön Tömösváry in 1883.
