= Reproductive system of gastropods =

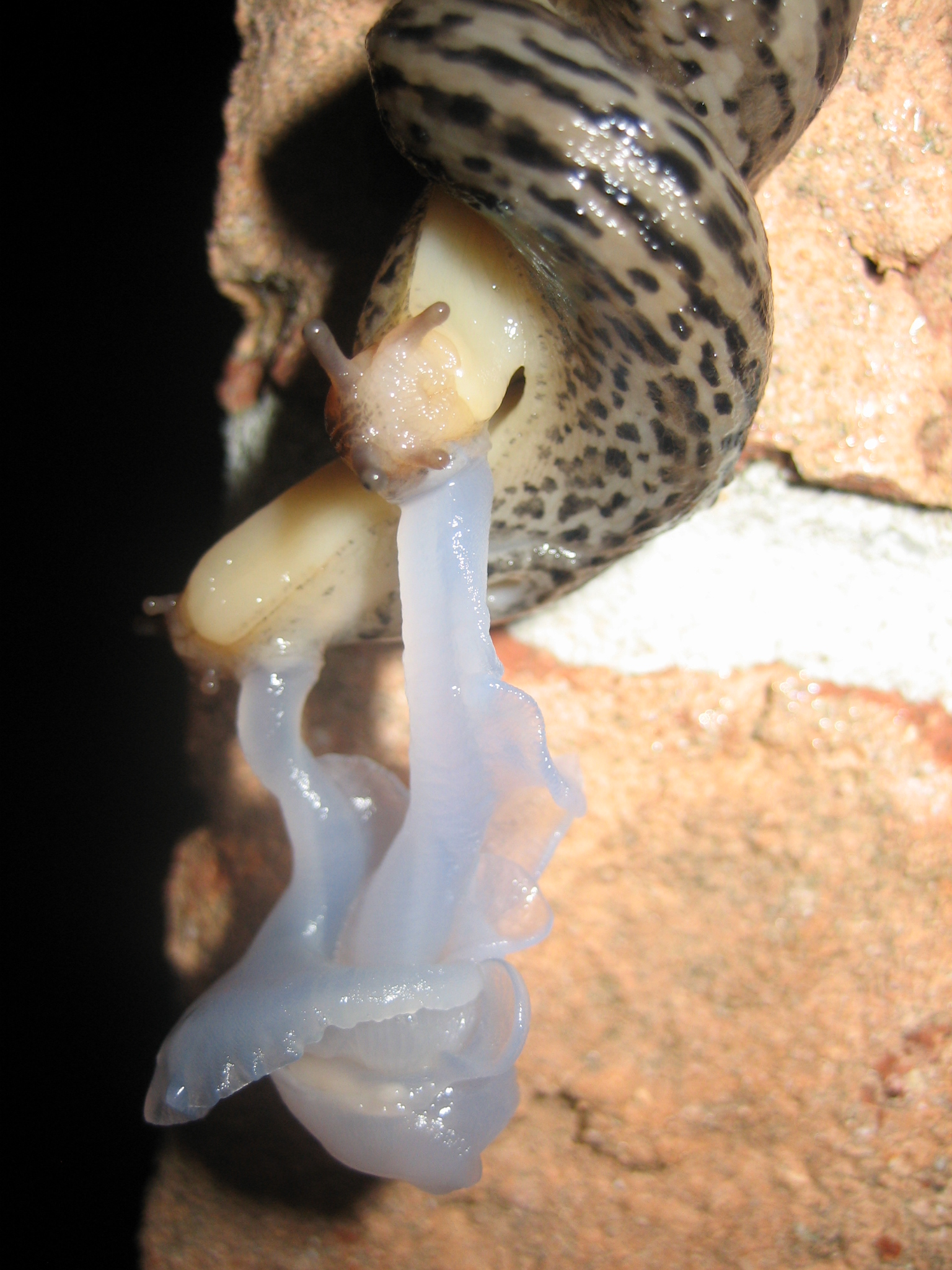
Entwined everted penises of a pair of mating hermaphrodite slugs in the species Limax maximus.

The reproductive system of gastropods (slugs and snails) varies greatly from one group to another within this very large and diverse taxonomic class of animals. Their reproductive strategies also vary greatly.

In many marine gastropods, there are separate sexes (male and female); most terrestrial gastropods however are hermaphrodites.

Courtship is a part of the behaviour of mating gastropods. In some families of pulmonate land snails, one unusual feature of the reproductive system and reproductive behavior is the creation and utilization of love darts, the throwing of which has been identified as a form of sexual selection.

Gastropods' reproductive systems vary significantly from one taxonomic group to another. They can be separated into three categories: marine, freshwater, and land. Reproducing in marine or freshwater environments makes getting sperm to egg much easier for gastropods, while on land, it is much more difficult to get sperm to egg. The majority of gastropods have internal fertilization, but there are some prosobranch species that have external fertilization. Gastropods are capable of being either male or female, or hermaphrodites, and this makes their reproduction system stand out amongst many other invertebrates. Hermaphroditic gastropods possess both the egg and sperm gametes which gives them the opportunity to self-fertilize. C. obtusus is a snail species of the Eastern Alps. In the easternmost populations of this species, there is strong evidence for self-fertilization.

== Reproductive system of marine gastropods ==
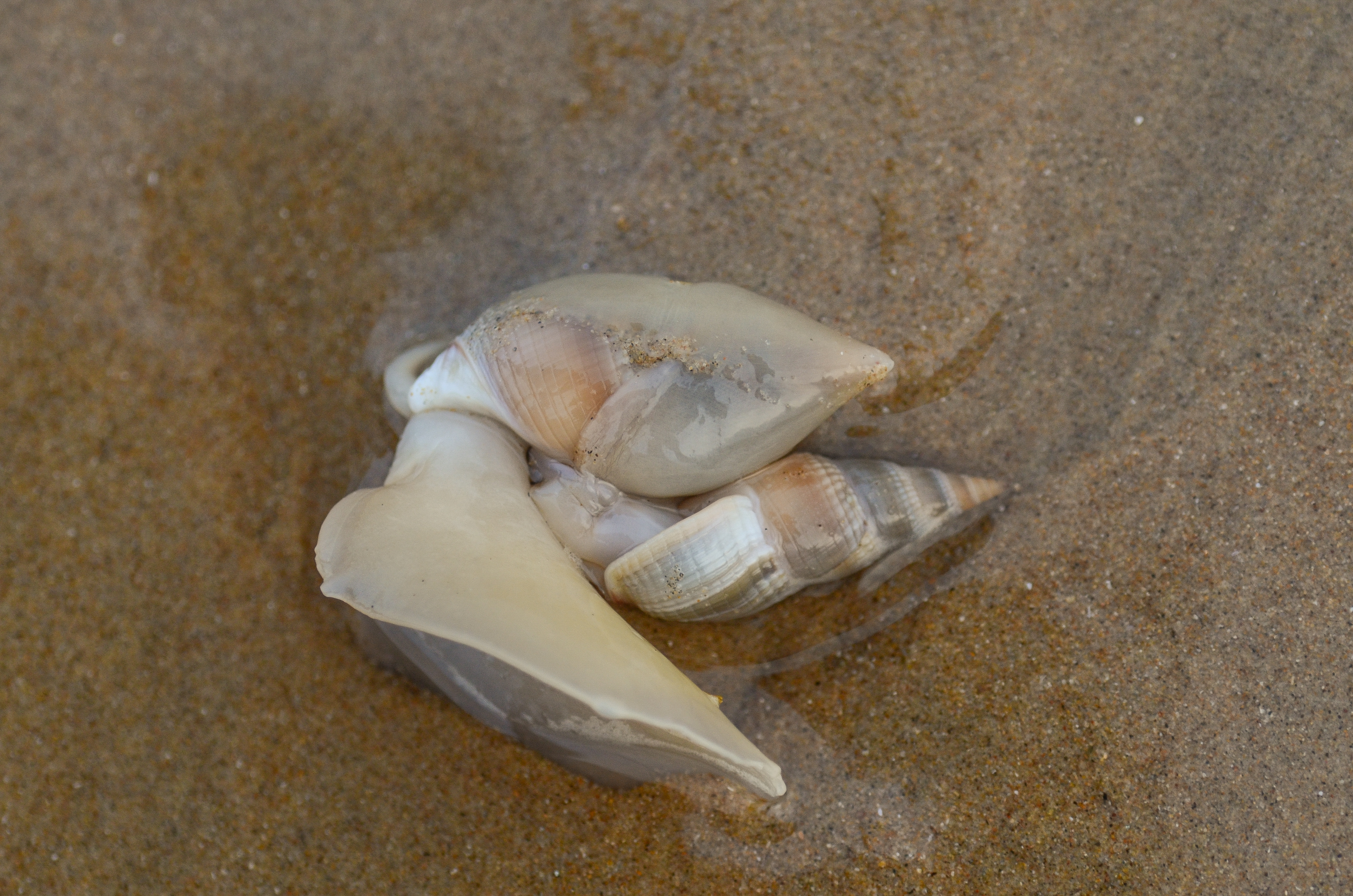
Marine gastropods mating.

The reproductive system of marine gastropods such as those from class Opisthobranchia and order Archaeogastropoda from the class Prosobranchia, is a continuous cycle of alternating male and female reproductive role prevalence. Immediately after spawning in late summer, the predominance of the female reproductive functions are terminated and gametogenesis initiates immediately, with the start of the predominance of the male reproductive role. Gametes remain in the gonads throughout the winter and early spring. The female reproductive role takes over again in May with fertilization of the gametes to form zygotes. The cycle comes full circle in late summer once again, with spawning.

=== Separate sexes ===
In many taxonomic groups of marine gastropods, there are separate sexes (i.e. they are dioecious/gonochoric).

In some of the main gastropod clades the great majority of species have separate sexes. This is true in most of the Patellogastropoda, Vetigastropoda, Cocculiniformia, Neritimorpha, and Caenogastropoda.

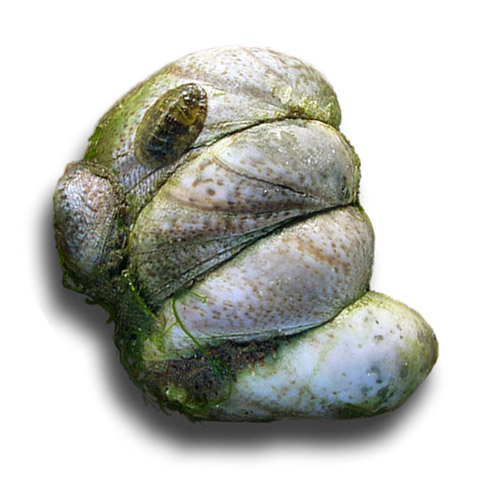
A stack of the protandrous species Crepidula fornicata: the small individual at the extreme lower left is currently a male, the other individuals are large enough to have become female

=== Protandrous sequential hermaphrodites ===
Within the clade Littorinimorpha however, the superfamily Calyptraeoidea are protandrous sequential hermaphrodites. Protandry means that the individuals first become male, and then later on become female. See for example the genus Crepidula.

=== Simultaneous hermaphrodites ===
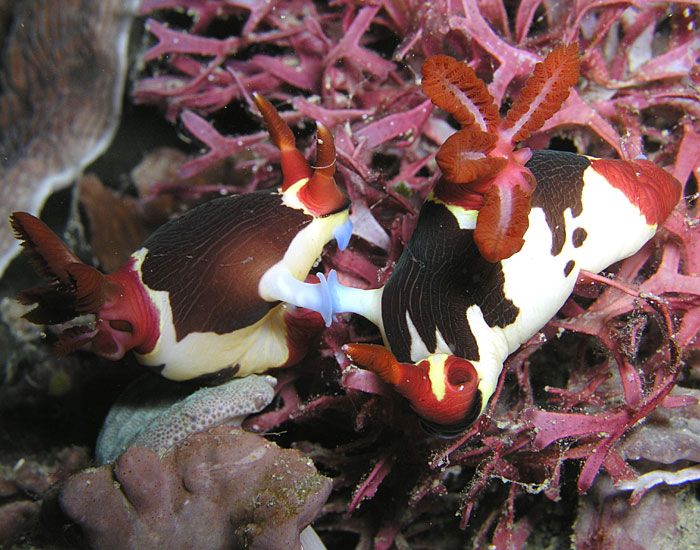
Two hermaphrodite opisthobranchs mating, the nudibranch species Nembrotha rutilans

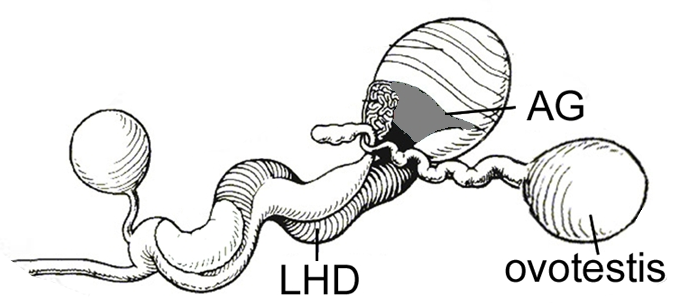
Drawing of reproductive system of Aplysia californica. AG - albumen gland, LHD - large hermaphroditic duct.

Within the main clade Heterobranchia, the informal group Opisthobranchia are simultaneous hermaphrodites (they have both sets of reproductive organs within one individual at the same time).

There are also a few marine pulmonates, and these are also hermaphroditic, for example, see the air-breathing sea slug family Onchidiidae, and the family of air-breathing marine "limpets" Siphonariidae.

== Reproductive system of land gastropods ==
=== Separate sexes ===
Although most land snails are pulmonates and are hermaphrodites, in contrast, all of the sea-dwelling prosobranch snails are dioecious/gonochoric (in other words, they have separate sexes). This includes the snails in the families Pomatiidae, Aciculidae, Cyclophoridae, and others. These land snails have opercula, which helps identify them as "winkles gone ashore", in other words, snails within the clade Littorinimorpha and the informal group Architaenioglossa.

Members of the snail family Pulmonata, which includes carboniferous land sails and some freshwater snails of the order Basommatophora, are protandrous hermaphrodites, meaning they are born male and later in life become female. In this family of snails, the male phase ends in December, followed by an egg maturation phase, and ends with oviposition, the act of laying eggs during May of the following year. Phylogenetic evidence for this is present based on the overall condition of the gonads especially in the degree of development of the genital ducts.

=== Simultaneous hermaphrodites ===
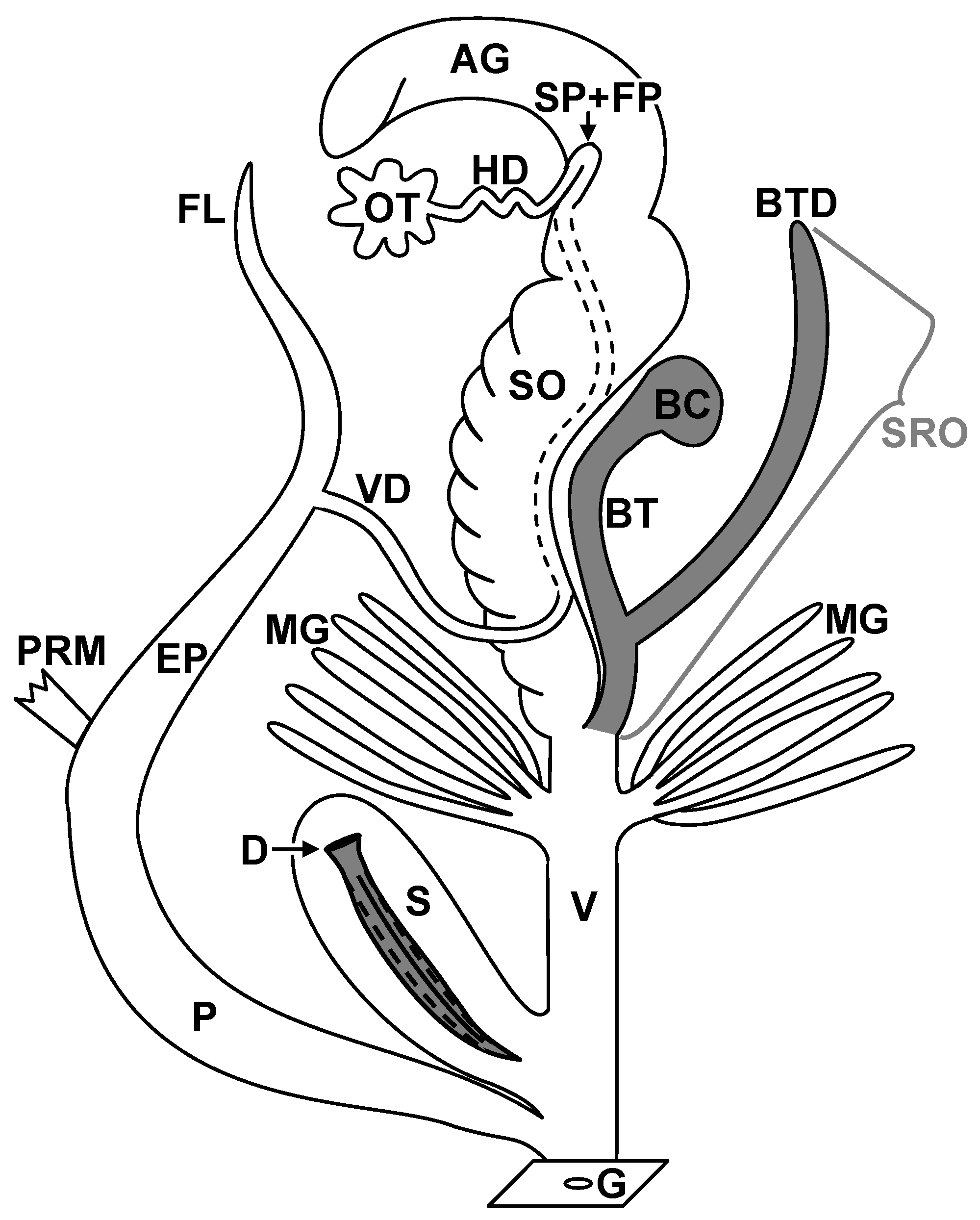
Simplified diagram of the reproductive morphology of a pulmonate land snail with one love dart and a diverticulum. AG = albumen gland BC = bursa copulatrix BT = bursa tract/trunk BTD = bursa tract diverticulum D = love dart EP = epiphallus FL = flagellum FP = fertilization pouch G = genital pore HD = hermaphroditic duct MG = mucous glands (nidamental gland) OT = ovotestis P = penis PRM = penis retractor muscle S = stylophore or dart sac (bursa telae) SO = spermoviduct SP = spermathecae SRO = spermatophore-receiving organ (indicated in grey) V = vagina VD = vas deferens

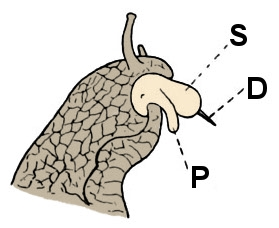
Head of a mating Helix pomatia showing the everted penis (P), and the dart sac (S) in the process of shooting a love dart (D).

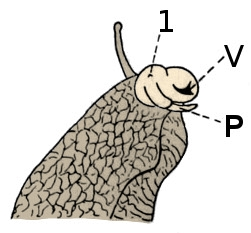
Head of Helix pomatia after mating with everted vagina (V) and penis (P).

Pulmonate land gastropods are simultaneous hermaphrodites and their reproductive system is complex. It is all completely internal, except for genital protrusion (eversion) during mating. The outer opening of the reproductive system is called the "genital pore"; it is positioned on the right-hand side, very close to the head of the animal. This opening is virtually invisible, however, unless it is actively in use.

The love-dart (if present) is produced and stored in the stylophore (often called dart sac) and shot by a forceful eversion of this organ. The mucous glands produce the mucus that is deposited on the dart before shooting. The penis is intromitted to transfer the spermatophore. The sperm container is formed in the epiphallus, while the spermatophore's tail is formed by the flagellum. When a bursa tract diverticulum is present, the spermatophore is received in this organ. Together with the bursa tract and bursa copulatrix these form the spermatophore-receiving organ, which digest sperm and spermatophores. Sperm swim out via the tail of the spermatophore to enter the female tract and reach the sperm storage organ (spermathecae) within the fertilization pouch-spermathecal complex.

Variability (polymorphism) of reproductive system in stylommatophorans is common feature. Such variability may include:

- euphallics = male copulatory organs have developed as usual
- hemiphallics = male copulatory organs are reduced
- aphallics = no male copulatory organs develop

also

- in Heterostoma paupercula, the epiphallus and flagellum can be either present or absent
- in Arion distinctus, there is usually a bipartite oviduct, but there is sometimes a tripartite free oviduct
- in Fruticicola fruticum, there is a variable number of mucous gland lobes in the auxiliary copulatory organs

Examples of reproductive system of various land snails:

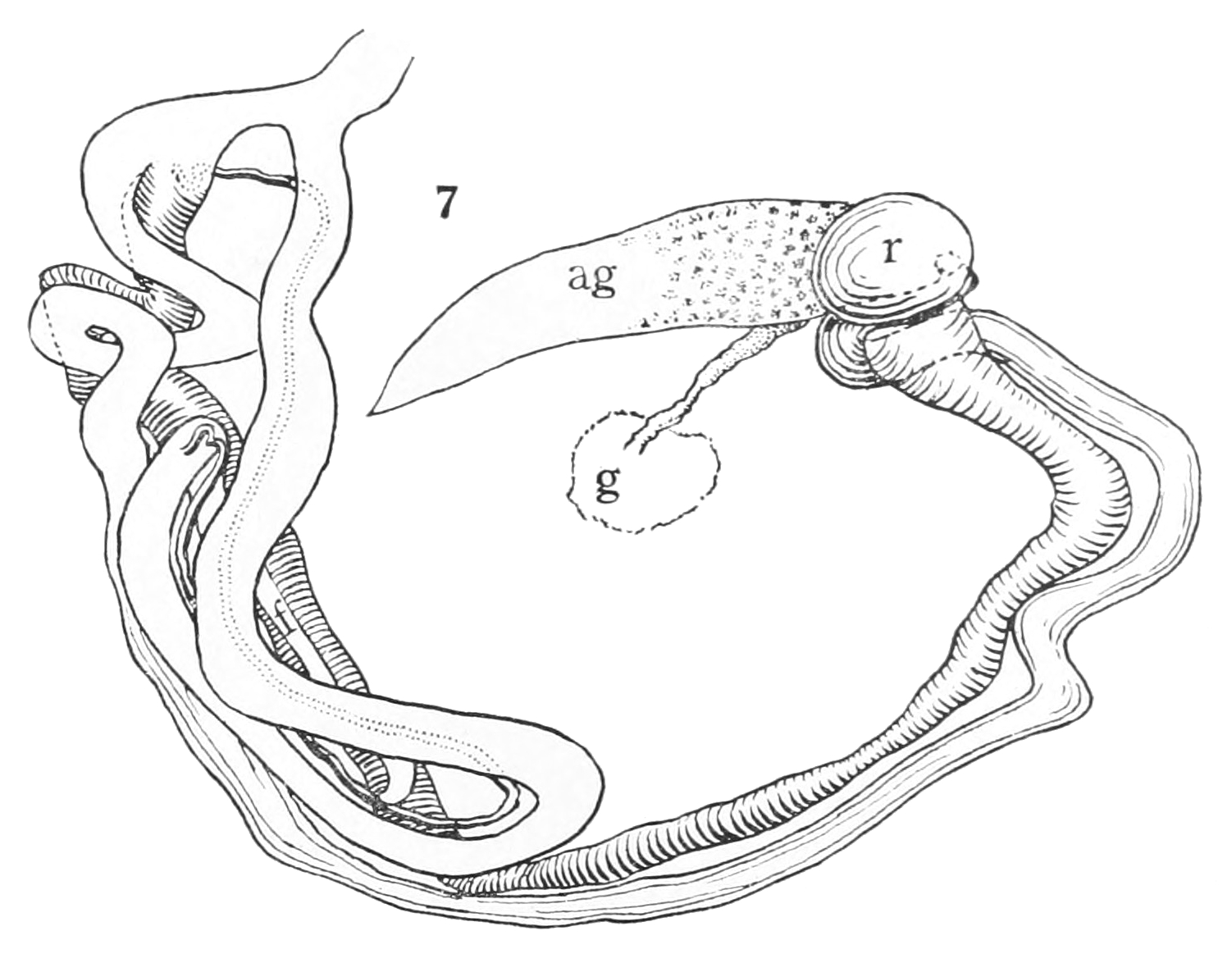
Anostoma depressum

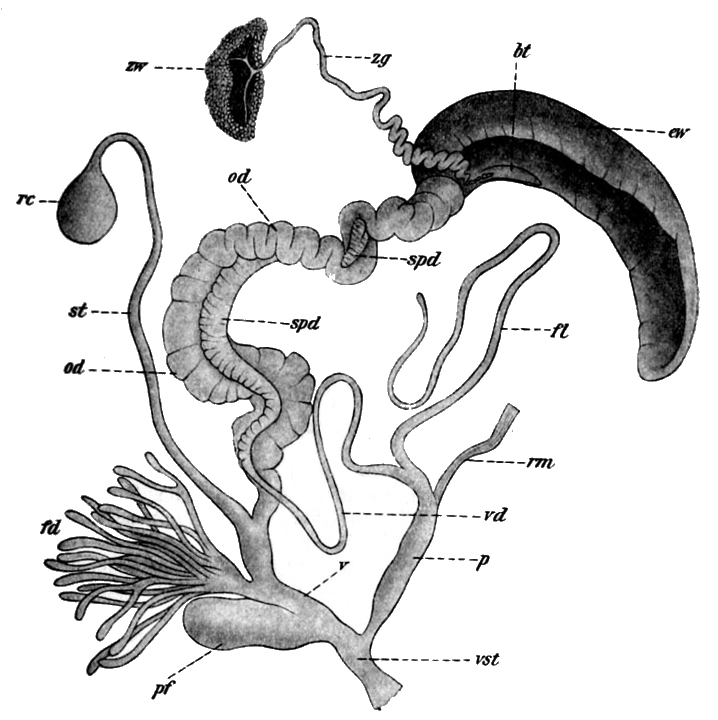
Helix pomatia

The structure of the reproductive system is strictly hermaphroditic. From the gonads, a hermaphrodite duct, a duct which is designed to transport both sperm and eggs, leads to a portion of the reproductive tract where the duct splits into a strictly male and strictly female portion.

The female portion includes a fertilization pouch and posterior and anterior mucous glands, which open up into a pallial cavity which leads to a small muscular vagina. The male portion of the reproductive tract includes both a short posterior vas deferens and a longer anterior vas deferens. The posterior vas deferens is followed by the prostate, and the anterior vas deferens flows through the haemocoele, an enlarged blastula filled with blood, of the head and opens into a muscular penis which is engulfed in a small portion of skin called the prepuce sac.

== Reproductive system in freshwater gastropods ==
=== Separate sexes and hermaphrodites ===
Species in the freshwater gastropod family such as the Caenogastropoda from the class Prosobranchia, are largely self-fertilizing; however after many generations of selfing, a physiological barrier halts sperm generation in that organism, and only allows for the introduction of foreign sperm. Gametes form in the ovotesties, an organ which produces both ova and sperm, and pass down into the hermaphroditic duct to the albumen gland, the junction of where the common duct splits to either vas deferens or oviduct, where they are stored until they are needed for either mating or self-fertilization. It is believed that this junction acts as a regulatory mechanism via contracting muscles, to help direct sperm or eggs into the correct ducts.

=== Mating ===
The sperm passes into the male duct, or vas deferens, where is receives secretory additions in the form of mucus from the prostate. After getting modified, the sperm passes into the penis. During mating season, the glandular cells in the penis sheath and prepuce swell to facilitate eversion of the penis. The sperm gets pushed through the penis, where they are introduced into the tail end of its copulatory partner. Within the partner snail, after fertilization from the foreign sperm, the eggs pass into the albumen gland where they are coated in mucus which forms the egg capsule.

=== Selfing ===
Eggs are released immediately before oviposition. Unlike in land gastropod species where fertilization occurs in fertilization pockets, fertilization in freshwater species happens at the lower end of the hermaphroditic duct, near the junction. Sperm is deposited into the bursa copulatrix which opens up into the vagina. The ova then enter the albumen gland to get a nutrient dense mucus coating which serves to form the egg capsule.

== Genital structures ==
Genital structures in Stylommatophora are listed below with the English name, then after the dash the Latin version (following the table in). Definitions and functions are discussed in.

- albumen gland – glandula albuginea; sits around the anterior end of the hermaphroditic duct and the posterior end of the spermoviduct; deposits nutrients around the fertilised eggs
- atrium – atrium / vestibulum; where the male and female tracts rejoin, adjacent to the genital pore
- bursa copulatrix – bursa copulatrix; still referred to by some as the spermatheca, which is also used for another structure; this organ digests sperm
- dart sac – bursa teloris; generates and holds the love dart
- diverticulum – diverticulum; a blind-ended branch of the pedunculus
- epiphallar caecum – epiphallus caecum
- epiphallus – epiphallus; defined by as the organ manufacturing the spermatophore (cf. original definition by )
- fertilisation pouch – camera fertilis; at the anterior end of the hermaphroditic duct
- flagellum – flagellum; a narrow blind-ended branch from the epiphallus
- free oviduct; the part of the oviduct from which the male duct has separated
- genital aperture or genital pore – apertura genitalis
- hermaphroditic duct – ductus hermaphroditicus; narrow tube connecting ovotestis to spermoviduct; stores sperm
- hermaphroditic gland or gonad – glandula hermaphroditica, ovotestis; where gametes are manufactured
- love dart – spiculum amoris; known to transfer secretions that can manipulate the partner
- mucous glands, digitiform glands – glandulae mucosae
- pedunculus or bursa duct or bursa trunk – pedunculus; the tube connecting the bursa copulatrix to the rest of the genitalia
- penial appendix – appendix
- penial caecum – caecum; note that "caecum" also often refers to a branch of the digestive tract
- penial papilla or verge – penis papilla
- penial sheath – tissue that encapsulates the penis
- penis – penis or phallus; the part of the male duct that is everted during copulation
- retractor muscle of the appendix – musculus retractor appendicis
- retractor muscle of the penis – musculus retractor penis
- retractor muscle of the vagina – musculus retractor vaginae
- spermatheca; used by some for the bursa copulatrix, especially in the past, and by others for a sperm storage organ near the fertilisation pouch
- spermatophore – spermatophora; many pulmonates transfer sperm inside a spermatophore
- spermoviduct – spermoviductus; made up of the uterus and sperm groove (with prostrate attached)
- stimulatory organ – appendicula
- talon or carrefour; structures at the junction of the hermaphroditic duct and spermoviduct, including the fertilisation pouch and spermatheca
- prostate – pars prostetica; a gland connected to the sperm groove along the sperm oviduct
- uterus – pars uterica; the female part of the spermoviduct
- vagina – vagina; defined by as the female tract between the bursa duct and the atrium
- vas deferens – vas deferens or ductus deferens; tube carrying the sperm from the spermoviduct to the epiphallus

=== Genital structures of males ===
The prostate is found in the mantle tubule and penis are both connected to the gonoduct; which are connected to the testis (produce sperm). During sex, the sperm travels along the mantle tube in which seminal fluid fills the mantle tube and exits the body via the penis and enters the female's gonopore.

Additional reproductive structures include

Gastropod anatomy.

- Vas deferens: it is found attached to the penis and the prostate and aids in the movement of sperm from the prostate to the penis
- Dart sac: manufactures the love dart. Not found in all gastropods.

=== Genital structures of females ===
Females have a gonopore that is connected to a seminal receptacle. The gonopore acts as an opening through which eggs are deposited. The opening leads into the mantle tubule, in which eggs flow from the oviduct and ovary. The mantle tubule produces three things, yolk; carries most of the nutrients needed to develop a healthy offspring, egg capsule formation, and sperm reception and storage; where fertilization occurs. After fertilization, eggs travel to the albumin glands to fill the yolk with protein, and lastly, the egg travels through the capsule glands, which coat the egg in a protective jelly.

Additional reproductive structures include:

- Uterus: stores the fertilized eggs until the eggs are ready to be laid
- Vagina: location where the eggs pass through to exit the gonopore

=== Genital structures of hermaphrodites ===
Hermaphrodites have both male and female reproductive parts. The male and female system act as separate units until the egg and sperm are ready to fuse together. The fusion of egg and sperm takes place in the uterus of the female system. Hermaphrodites also have a hermaphroditic duct, which helps change the sex of the gastropod during certain times of the year.

== See also ==
- Mating of gastropods
- Apophallation
- Reproductive system of mollusks
- Reproductive system of cephalopods
