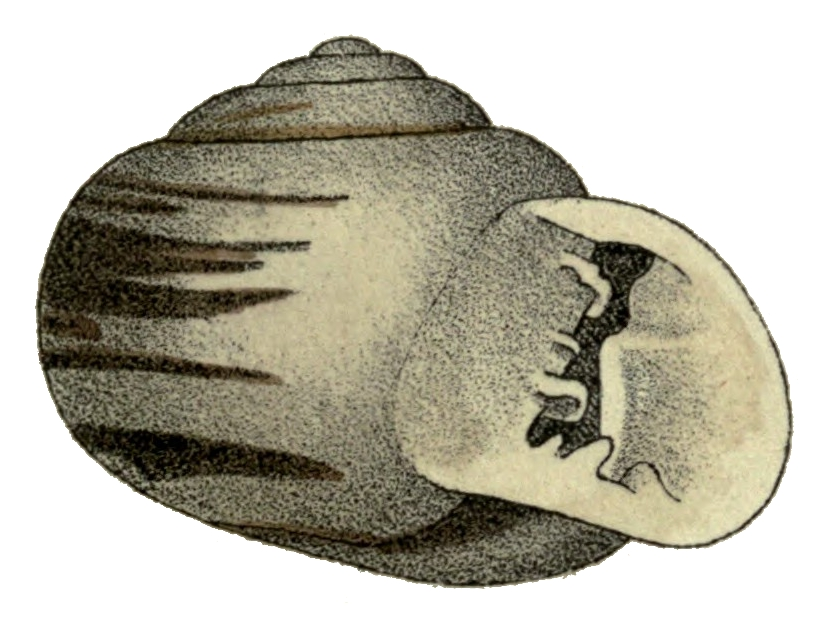
- Drawing of a shell of Tomigerus clausus

Scientific classification
- Kingdom: Animalia
- Phylum: Mollusca
- Class: Gastropoda
- Order: Stylommatophora
- Family: Tomogeridae
- Genus: Tomigerus
- Species: T. clausus

Binomial name
- Tomigerus clausus Spix, 1827

= Tomigerus clausus =

Species of gastropod

Tomigerus clausus is a species of air-breathing land snail, a terrestrial pulmonate gastropod mollusk in the family Tomogeridae.

== Distribution ==
This species occurs in Brazil.

== Anatomy ==
The anatomy of Tomigerus clausus was examined by Harold Heath in 1914.

The mantle has more highly thickened margins and more glandular epithelium than in the genusAnostoma, extending throughout the body whorl of the shell to the region adjacent to the aperture. It thus terminates at the point where the ureter bends abruptly upon itself. The external openings of the ureter and intestine occupy the usual positions on the right side, and from this point they pursue a course parallel to the external surface of the body, in close contact with the mantle cavity. The ureter bends sharply upon itself at the termination of the mantle cavity, and, dorsally placed with reference to this chamber, proceeds anteriorly to unite with the forward extremity of the kidney. The body of the kidney is a compact, sac-like body consisting, as usual, of highly folded glandular epithelium confined, in the posterior half of the organ, to the outer face. The pericardium is in contact with this glandular section throughout its entire length, but is scarcely more than half as extensive. A pericardial opening was not observed. It may be added that the kidney is placed dorsally with reference to the pericardium.

There are no special features of the digestive system of Anostoma depressum.

The reproductive system, considering that the gonad is in a highly quiescent state, is comparatively large and more compact than in Anostoma. The gonad consists of several slender diverticula, located in the apical whorls of the visceral mass. These contain primitive sex cells undifferentiated into sperm and ova. The hermaphroditic duct extends ventrally, close to the columella, and shortly before entering the accessory glands it attaches to a slender pear-shaped organ, possibly a seminal vesicle, consisting of upwards of ten small diverticula imbedded in a muscular sheath. These are empty and give no sign of glandular activity. The accessory glands are voluminous though inactive organs, though several lobes give them a much greater dorso-ventral thickness. The duct leading from the accessory glands becomes considerably widened near its proximal extremity, and possibly functions as a shell gland. As in Anostoma, the duct from the seminal receptacle springs from this point, and, as a slender canal, proceeds to the spacious sack situated in close proximity to the accessory glands. The vas deferens, likewise, unites with the penis some distance from its distal extremity, thus forming a flagellum. No penis retractor has been discovered in this region. On the other hand, several strands attaching to the penis sheath in the neighborhood of the outer opening may operate as retractors.
