= Bursa copulatrix (gastropods) =

Anatomical structure

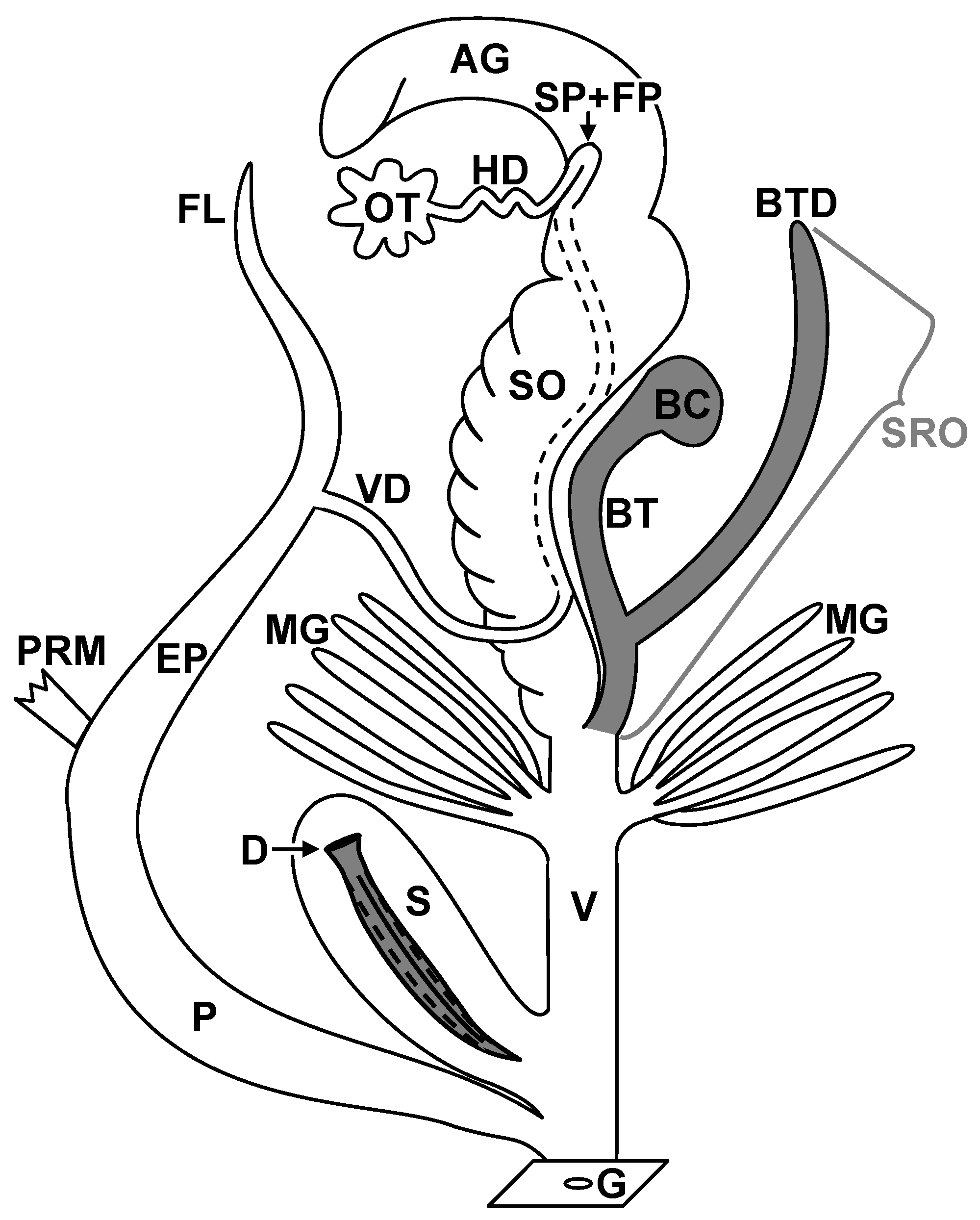
Simplified diagram of the reproductive morphology of a pulmonate land snail. AG = albumen gland BC = bursa copulatrix BT = bursa tract/trunk (bursal duct) BTD = bursa tract diverticulum D = love dart EP = epiphallus FL = flagellum FP = fertilization pouch G = genital pore HD = hermaphroditic duct MG = mucous glands (nidamental gland) OT = ovotestis P = penis PRM = penis retractor muscle S = stylophore or dart sac (bursa telae) SO = spermoviduct SP = spermathecae SRO = spermatophore-receiving organ (indicated in grey) V = vagina VD = vas deferens

The bursa copulatrix, also known as gametolytic sac or gametolytic gland, is an anatomical structure found in the female and hermaphroditic reproductive system of various gastropods, playing a central role in the digestion or storage of spermatozoa after copulation. It is typically connected to the reproductive tract through a bursal duct, and may be associated with other reproductive structures such as the albumen gland, seminal receptacle, or the hermaphroditic duct, among others. It shows considerable morphological variation across taxonomic groups, reflecting its adaptive role in gastropod reproductive strategies. It is morphologically and functionally diverse among gastropods and has significant implications for understanding the evolutionary biology and systematics of the group.

== Literature cited ==
- Ponder, W. F., Lindberg, D. R., & Ponder, J. M. 2019. Biology and Evolution of the Mollusca, Volume 1. Boca Raton: CRC Press, 900 pp. ISBN 978-0-8153-6169-5
- Ponder, W. F., Lindberg, D. R., & Ponder, J. M. 2020. Biology and Evolution of the Mollusca, Volume 2. Boca Raton: CRC Press, 870 pp. ISBN 978-0-8153-6184-8
