= Hermaphroditic duct =

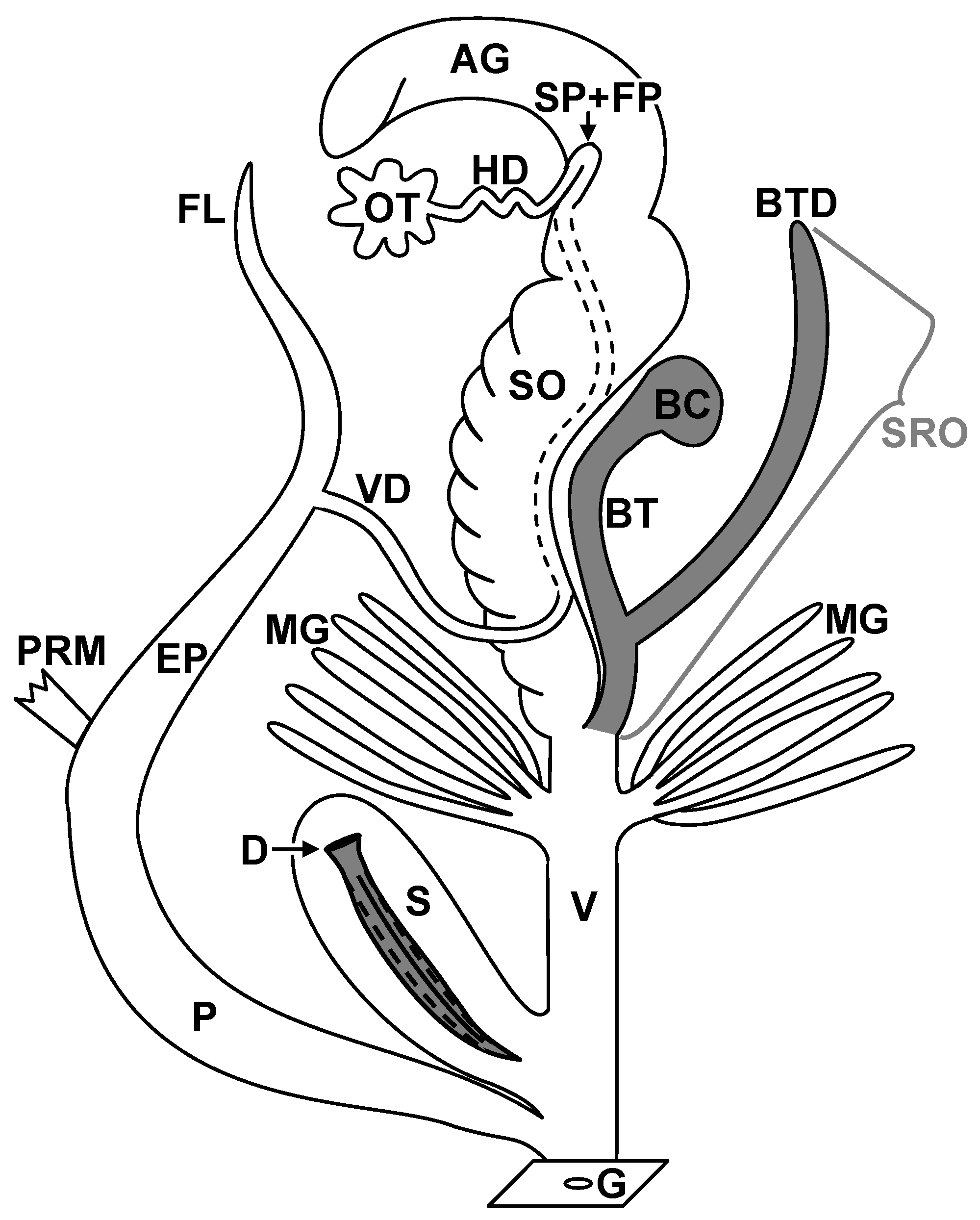
Simplified diagram of the reproductive morphology of a pulmonate land snail. AG = albumen gland BC = bursa copulatrix BT = bursa tract/trunk BTD = bursa tract diverticulum D = love dart EP = epiphallus FL = flagellum FP = fertilization pouch G = genital pore HD = hermaphroditic duct MG = mucous glands (nidamental gland) OT = ovotestis P = penis PRM = penis retractor muscle S = stylophore or dart sac (bursa telae) SO = spermoviduct SP = spermatheca SRO = spermatophore-receiving organ (indicated in grey) V = vagina VD = vas deferens

The hermaphroditic duct is an anatomical structure in the reproductive system of many hermaphroditic gastropod mollusks, particularly among pulmonates and opisthobranchs. It serves as a conduit for gametes, transporting both sperm and ova from the gonad, commonly referred to as the ovotestis, to different regions of the reproductive tract.

== Structure and function ==
In simultaneous hermaphrodites, such as many land snails and opisthobranchs, the gonad produces both eggs and sperm. These gametes enter a common channel, the hermaphroditic duct, which carries them toward a reproductive system region where they are either stored, matured, or further transported. This duct typically connects the ovotestis to secondary reproductive organs such as the albumen gland, spermoviduct, or copulatory structures.
