= Albumen gland =

Component of molluscan reproductive anatomy

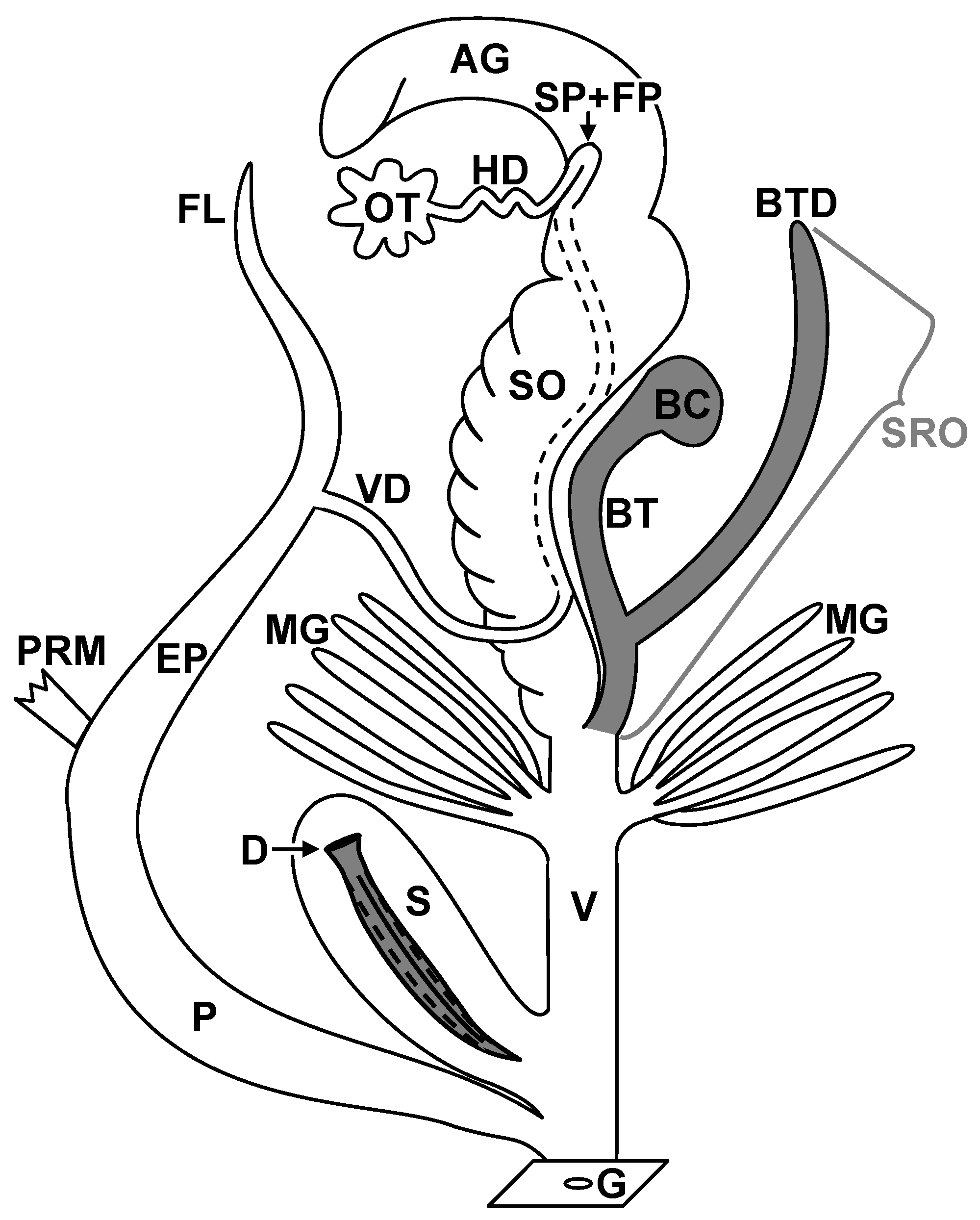
Simplified diagram of the reproductive morphology of a pulmonate land snail. AG = albumen gland BC = bursa copulatrix BT = bursa tract/trunk BTD = bursa tract diverticulum D = love dart EP = epiphallus FL = flagellum FP = fertilization pouch G = genital pore HD = hermaphroditic duct MG = mucous glands (nidamental gland) OT = ovotestis P = penis PRM = penis retractor muscle S = stylophore or dart sac (bursa telae) SO = spermoviduct SP = spermathecae SRO = spermatophore-receiving organ (indicated in grey) V = vagina VD = vas deferens

The albumen gland is a specialized gland found in the reproductive systems of many mollusks. It plays an important role in the formation and nourishment of egg capsules, contributing to embryonic development by producing nutritive and protective secretions. This gland is typically part of the female or hermaphroditic reproductive tract and is often adjacent to other accessory glands such as the capsule gland.

== Structure ==
The albumen gland is generally composed of secretory epithelial cells responsible for synthesizing and storing glycoprotein-rich substances. These secretions are essential for embedding fertilized ova and supporting early development. Histological studies in species such as Purpura bufo have shown that the gland is made up of mucous and granular cells, with abundant rough endoplasmic reticulum and Golgi complexes, both indicative of intense protein synthesis activity.

In Pomacea canaliculata, ultrastructural investigations have revealed a complex arrangement of parenchymal cells in the albumen gland that contribute to the synthesis of perivitellins, proteins that provide nutrition and protection to developing embryos.

== Function ==
The main function of the albumen gland is to produce albumen, a nutritive material that envelops fertilized eggs and forms a major component of the egg capsule. In oviparous gastropods, this secretion not only supplies energy-rich compounds but also acts as a buffering medium and may contain antimicrobial agents that protect the embryo from infection. The albumen gland also secretes perivitellins, which are egg proteins found in the perivitelline fluid of many gastropods. These proteins, such as ovorubin and PcPV2 among others, are multifunctional complexes that provide the developing embryo with nutrition, protection from the environment, and defense against predators.

The gland’s activity may be closely linked to environmental factors such as temperature and photoperiod. For instance, in Oxychilus atlanticus, maturation of the albumen gland correlates with reproductive cycles influenced by seasonal changes.

== Comparative morphology ==
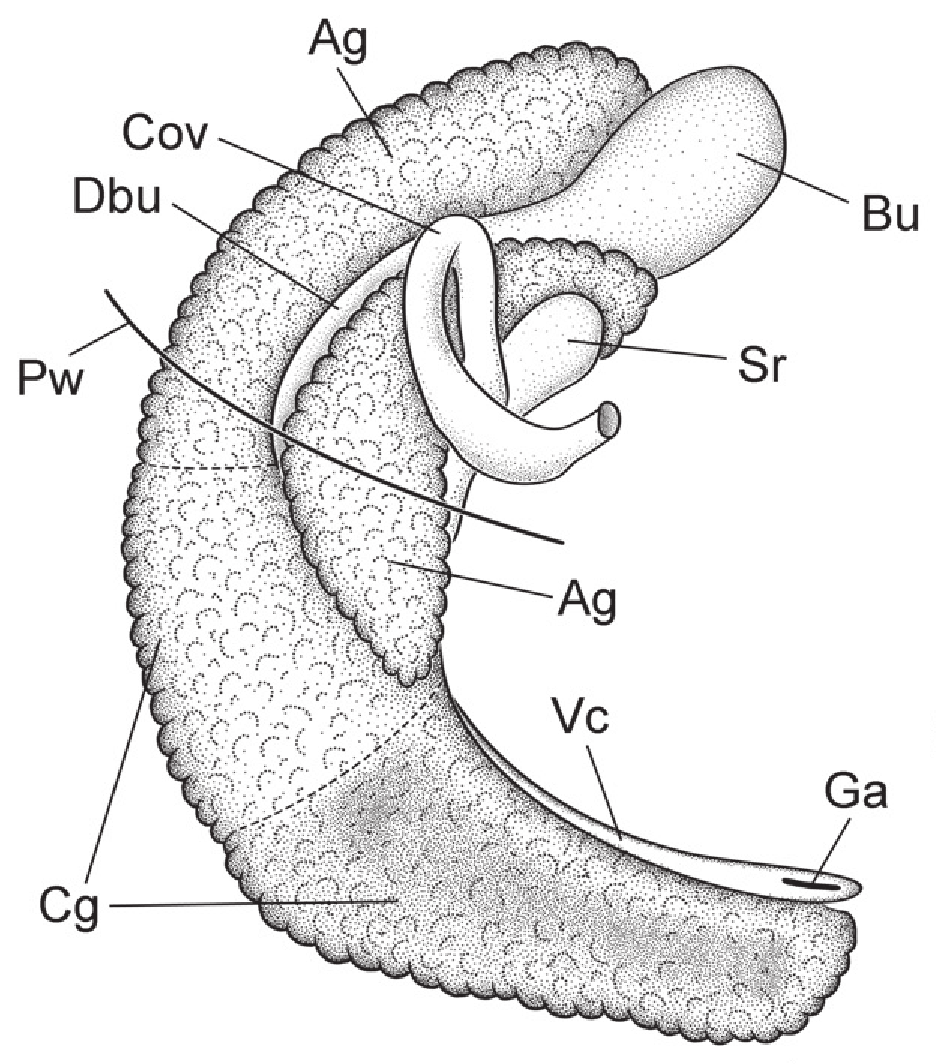
Drawing of the female glandular oviduct and associated structures (viewed from left side) of Marstonia comalensis. Ag = albumen gland, Bu = bursa copulatrix, Cg = capsule gland, Cov = coiled oviduct, Dbu = bursal duct, Ga = genital aperture, Pw = posterior wall of pallial cavity, Sr = seminal receptacle, Vc = ventral channel of capsule gland.

Comparative anatomical studies among opisthobranchs and pulmonates reveal significant diversity in the morphology and complexity of the albumen gland. This variation is often associated with differences in reproductive strategies and ecological adaptations. In opisthobranchs, for example, the gland is often part of an integrated nidamental gland complex along with other accessory structures.

== Biochemical aspects ==
Proteomic analyses in apple snails of the genus Pomacea have uncovered a wide variety of bioactive proteins in the albumen gland, including storage proteins, lectins, and antioxidants. These compounds suggest that the gland not only provides nutrition but also enhances defense, supporting embryo viability under adverse environmental conditions.
