= Neuro biomechanics =

Neuro biomechanics is a field dedicated to the general study of human movement from various basic perspectives: musculo-skeletal functional anatomy, CNS and neuro-muscular physiology, physics, control theory with cybernetics and computer science. It is based upon the research of bioengineering researchers, neuro-surgery, orthopedic surgery and biomechanists. Neuro Biomechanics are utilized by neurosurgeons, orthopedic surgeons and primarily by integrated physical medicine practitioners. Practitioners are focused on aiding people in the restoration of biomechanics of the skeletal system in order to measurably improve nervous system function, health, function, quality of life, reduce pain and the progression of degenerative joint and disc disease.

Neuro: of or having to do with the nervous system. Nervous system: An organ system that coordinates the activities of muscles, monitors organs, constructs and processes data received from the senses and initiates actions. The human nervous system coordinates the functions of itself and all organ systems including but not limited to the cardiovascular system, respiratory system, skin, digestive system, immune system, hormonal, metabolic, musculoskeletal, endocrine system, blood and reproductive system. Optimal function of the organism as a whole depends upon the proper function of the nervous system.

Biomechanics: (biology, physics) The branch of biophysics that deals with the mechanics of the human or animal body; especially concerned with muscles and the skeleton. The study of biomechanical influences upon nervous system function and load bearing joints.

Research:

- Research on established ideal mechanical models for the human locomotor system.

Panjabi MM, Journal of Biomechanics, 1974. A note on defining body parts configurations

Gracovetsky S. Spine 1986; The Optimum Spine

Yoganandan, Spine 1996

Harrison. Spine 2004 Modeling of the Sagittal Cervical Spine as a Method to Discriminate Hypolordosis: Results of Elliptical and Circular Modeling in 72 Asymptomatic Subjects, 52 Acute Neck Pain Subjects, and 70 Chronic Neck Pain Subjects; Spine 2004

Panjabi et al. Spine 1997 Whiplash produces and S-Shape curve...

Harrision DE, JMPT 2003, Increasing the Cervical Lordosis with CBP Seated Combined Extension-Compression and Transverse Load Cervical Traction with Cervical Manipulation: Non-randomized Clinical Control Trial

Harrison. Journal of Spinal Disorders 1998: Elliptical Modeling of the Sagittal Lumbar Lordosis and Segmental Rotation Angles as a Method to Discriminate Between Normal and Low Back Pain Subjects.

Gleb DE. Spine 1995: An Analysis of Sagittal Spinal Alignment in 100 Asymptomatic Middle and Older Aged Volunteers.

Janik TJ, Journal Orthop Res, 1998, Can the sagittal lumbar curvature be closely approximated by an ellipse?

Harrision. Spine 2001: Methods for Cervical Mensuration analyzed

Voutsinas SA, Clinical Orthorpedics 1986

Bernhardt M. Spien 1989: Segmental Analysis of the Sagittal Plane Alignment of the Normal Thoracic and Lumbar Spines and Thoracolumbar Junction.

Harrision DE, Archives of Physical Medicine and Rehabilitation 2002, A new 3-point bending traction method for restoring cervical lordosis and cervical manipulation: a nonrandomized clinical controlled trial

Helliwell PS, Journal of Bone and Joint Surgery, 1994 The straight cervical spine: does it indicate muscle spasm?

Banks, R. Journal of Crash Prevention and Injury Control 2000: Alignment of the lumbar vertebrae in a driving posture

Troyanovich SJ, JMPT 1998 Structural rehabilitation of the spine and posture:

Sheng-Yun L. PLoS One 2014: Comparison of Modic Changes in the Lumbar and Cervical Spine, in 3167 Patients wit hand without Spinal Pain.

Harrison DE. Journal of Spinal Disorders & Techniques: 2002, Can the Thoracic Kyphosis Be Modeled With a Simple Geometric Shape?: The Results of Circular and Elliptical Modeling in 80 Asymptomatic Patients

- Research regarding Primary non surgical treatment:
- Review of surgical outcomes regarding biomechanics, biomechanical effects on neurologic function.

Treatment:

Non-Surgical

Surgical
