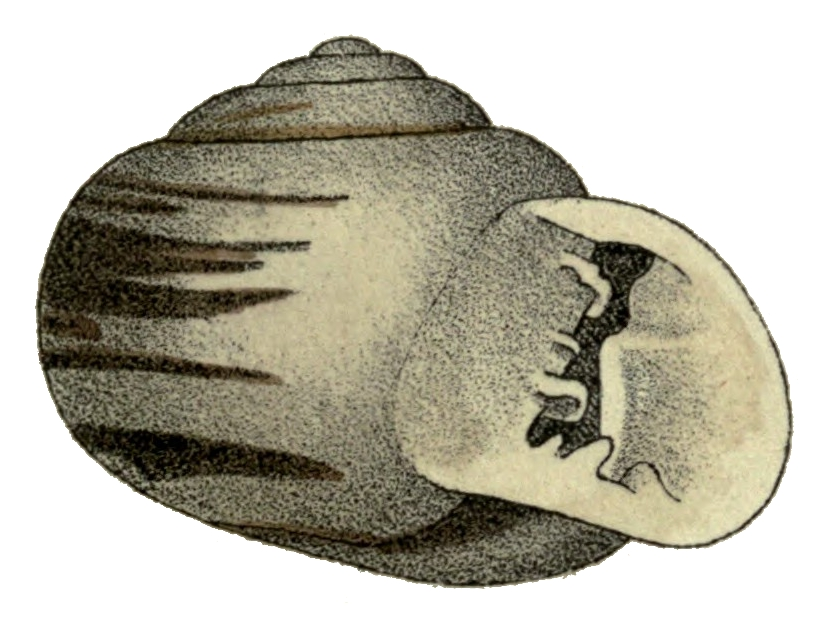
- Drawing of a shell of Tomigerus clausus

Scientific classification
- Kingdom: Animalia
- Phylum: Mollusca
- Class: Gastropoda
- Order: Stylommatophora
- Family: Tomogeridae
- Genus: Tomigerus; Spix, 1827

= Tomigerus =

Genus of gastropods

Tomigerus is a genus of air-breathing, tropical land snails, terrestrial pulmonate gastropod mollusks in the family Tomogeridae.

== Species ==
This genus contains the following species:

- Tomigerus clausus Spix, 1827
- Tomigerus corrugatus Ihering, 1905
- Tomigerus esamianus Salgado & Coelho, 1990
- Tomigerus laevis Ihering, 1905
- Tomigerus matthewsi Salgado & Leme, 1991
- Tomigerus pilsbryi Baker, 1914
- Tomigerus rochai Ihering, 1905

Synonyms:

- Tomigerus gibberulus is a synonym of Digerus gibberulus (Burrow, 1815) - extinct
- Tomigerus turbinatus is a synonym of Biotocus turbinatus (Pfeiffer, 1845) - extinct

== How the shell is carried ==
It is evident from several features of the shell and its internal organization that the shell in this genus is carried with its principal axis transverse to the longitudinal axis of the foot; that is, the spire is directed to the right. The flattened surface of the outer whorl thus rests upon the dorsal surface of the foot or upon the substratum when the animal is in a state of aestivation, a position which they had assumed in both instances.
