= Stallion =

Male horse that has not been castrated

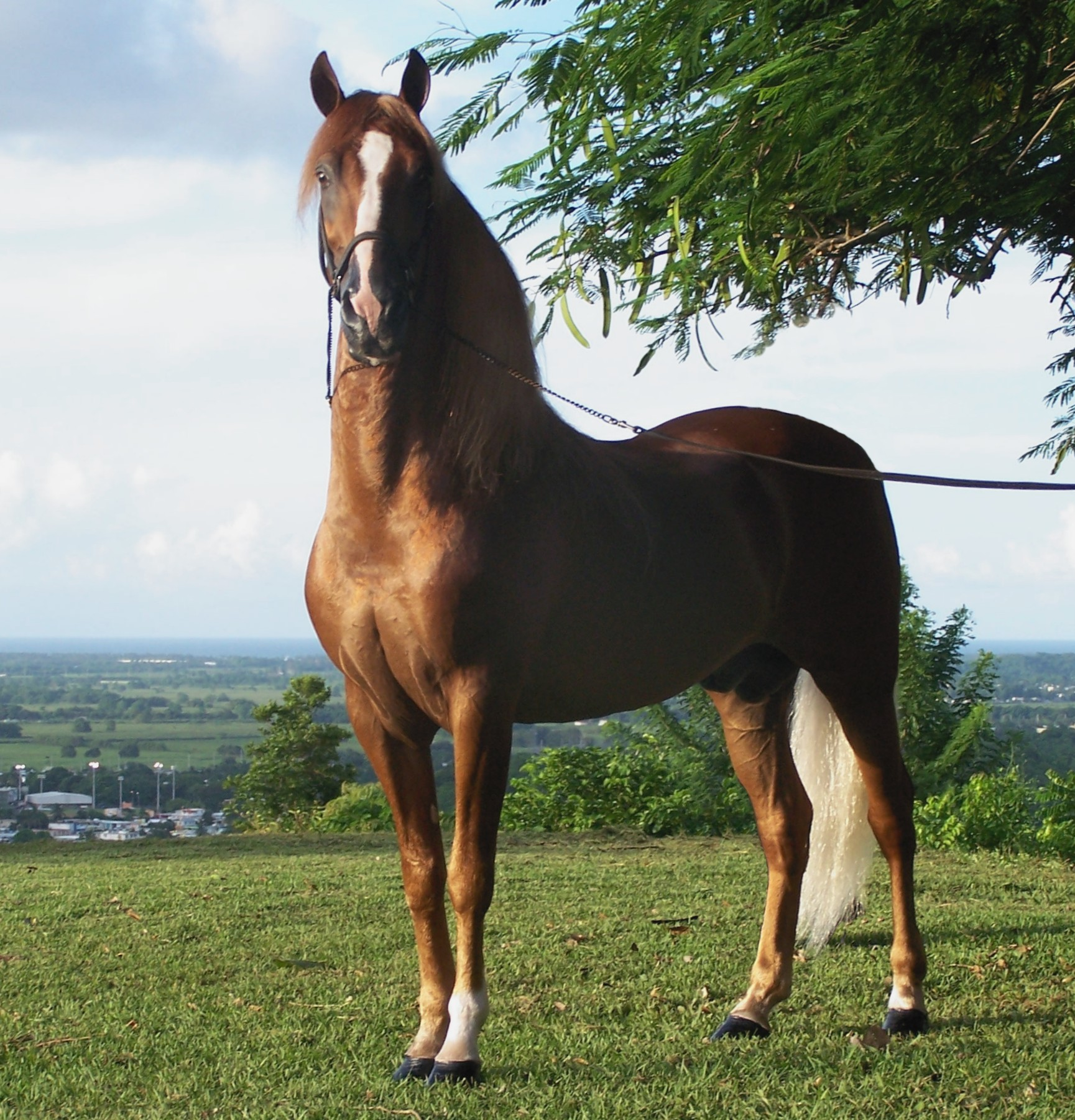
A stallion standing up in Puerto Rico

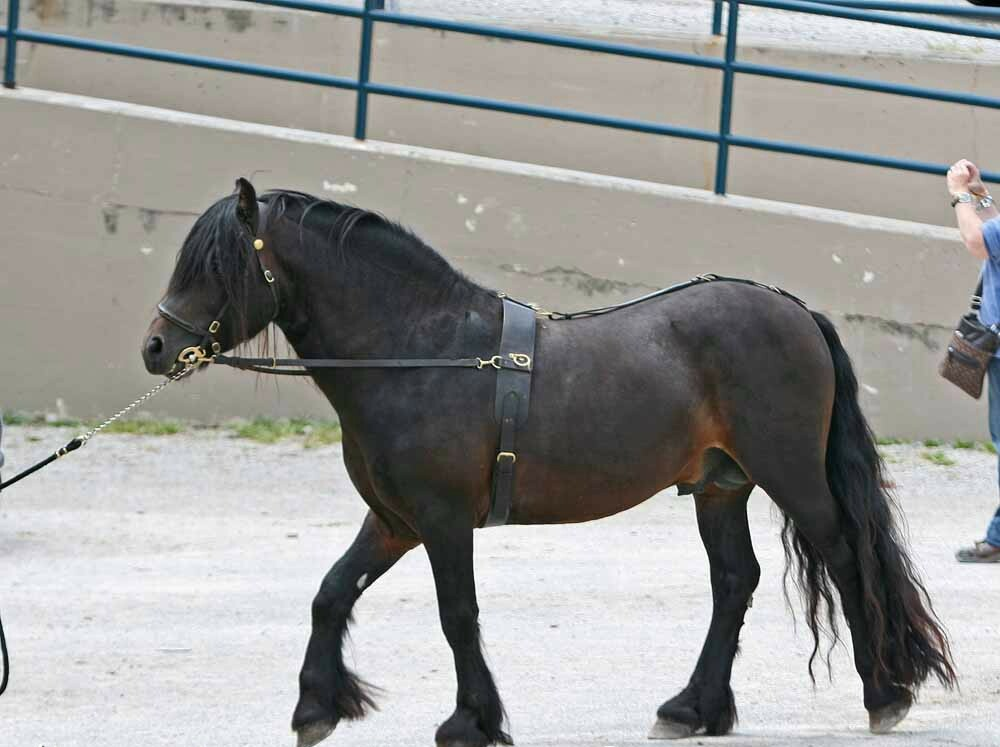
A stallion walking

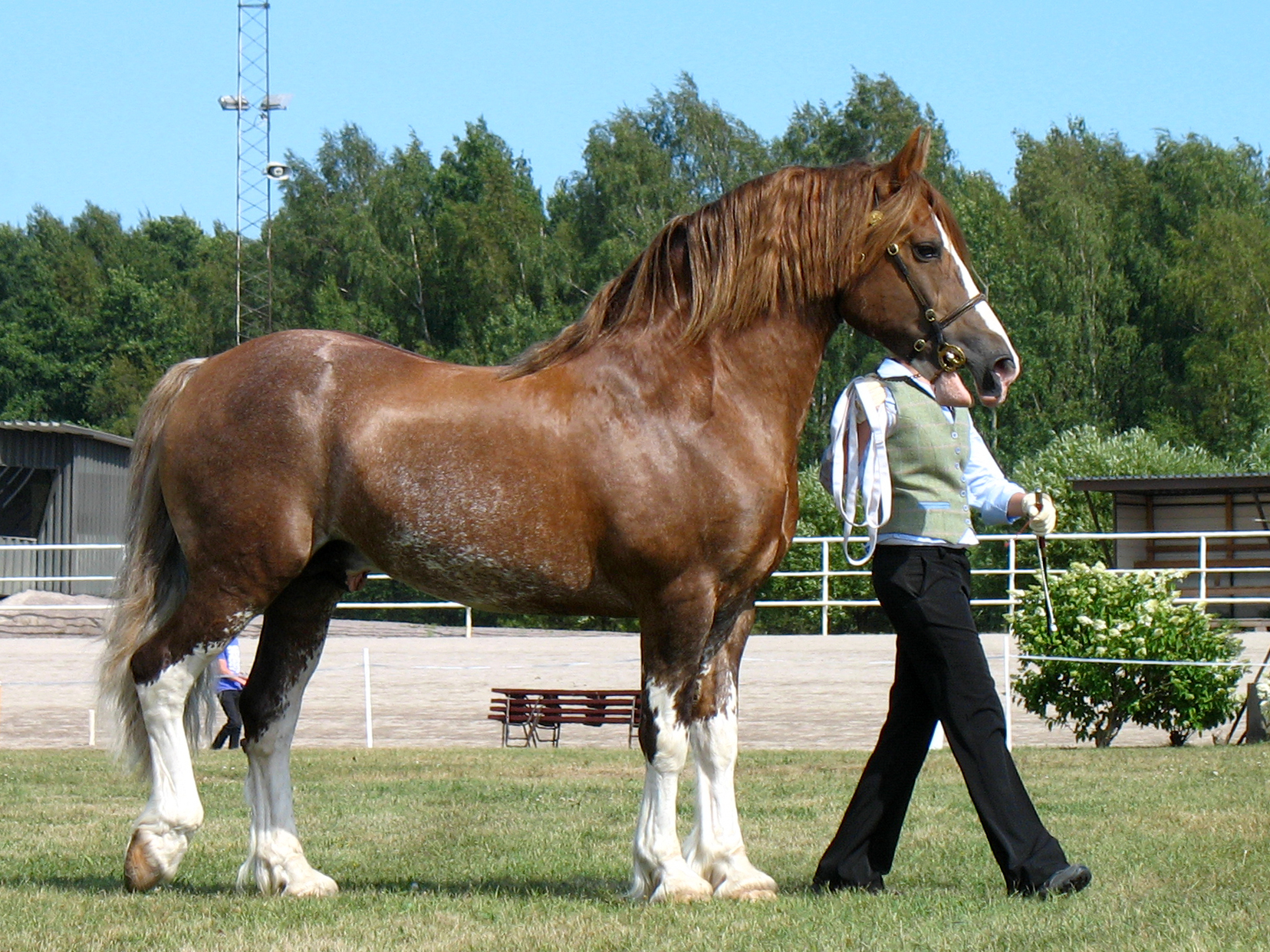
A stallion's secondary characteristics include heavier muscling than is seen in mares or geldings, often with muscular development along the crest of the neck.

A stallion is an adult male horse that has not been gelded (castrated). Stallions follow the conformation and phenotype of their breed, but within that standard, the presence of hormones such as testosterone may give stallions a thicker, "cresty" neck, as well as a somewhat more muscular physique as compared to female horses, known as mares, and castrated males, called geldings.

Temperament varies widely based on genetics and training, but because of their instincts as herd animals, they may be prone to aggressive behavior, particularly toward other stallions, and thus require careful management by knowledgeable handlers. With proper training and management, stallions are effective equine athletes at the highest levels of many disciplines, including horse racing, horse shows, and international Olympic competition.

"Stallion" is also used to refer to males of other equids, including zebras and donkeys.

== Herd behavior ==
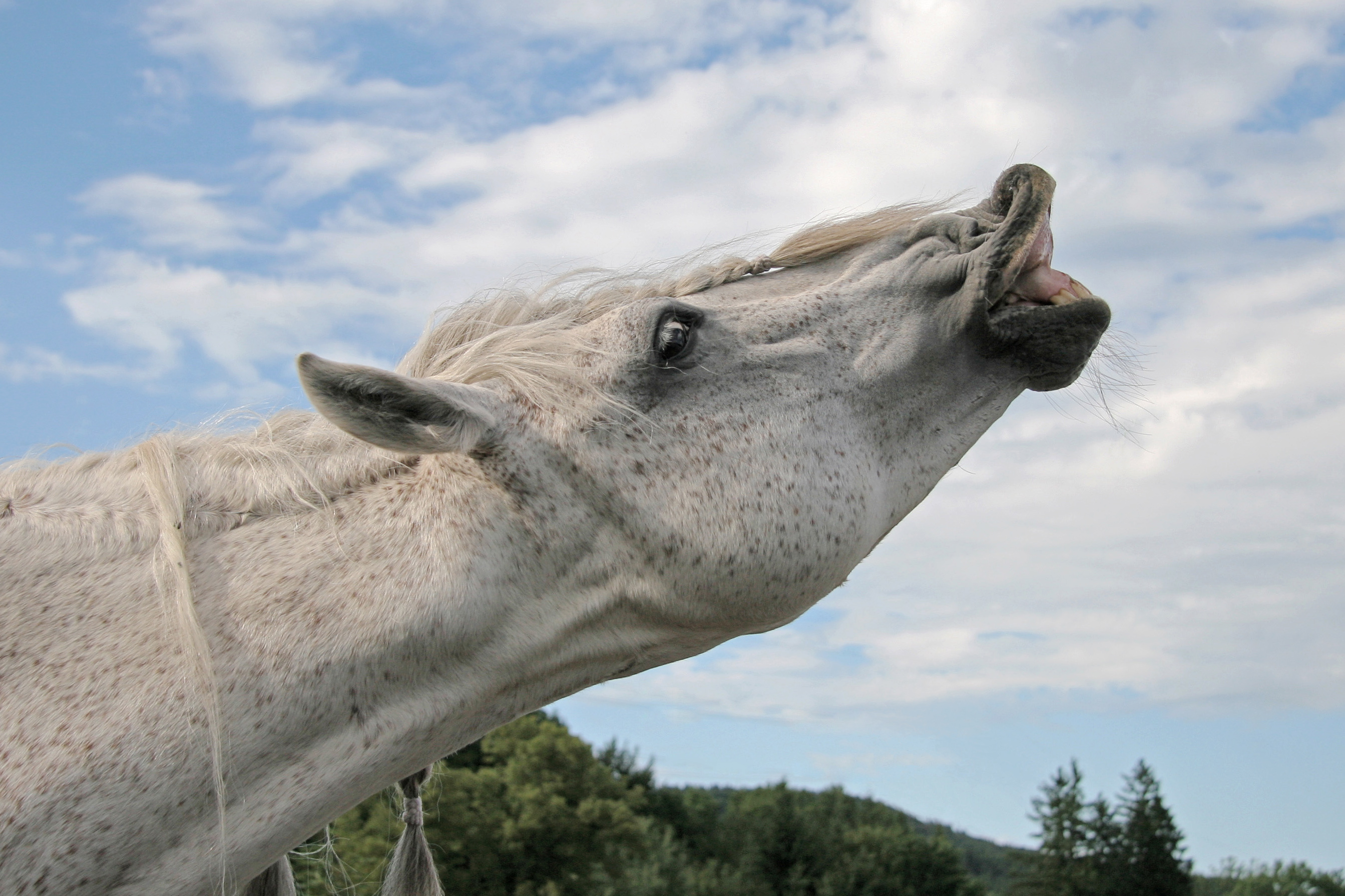
Stallion exhibiting the flehmen response

Young female horses usually leave their band and join one with a different stallion from the one that sired them. Young male horses without mares of their own usually form small, all-male, "bachelor bands" in the wild. Living in a group gives these stallions the social and protective benefits of living in a herd. A bachelor herd may also contain older stallions who have lost their herd in a challenge.

== Reproductive anatomy ==
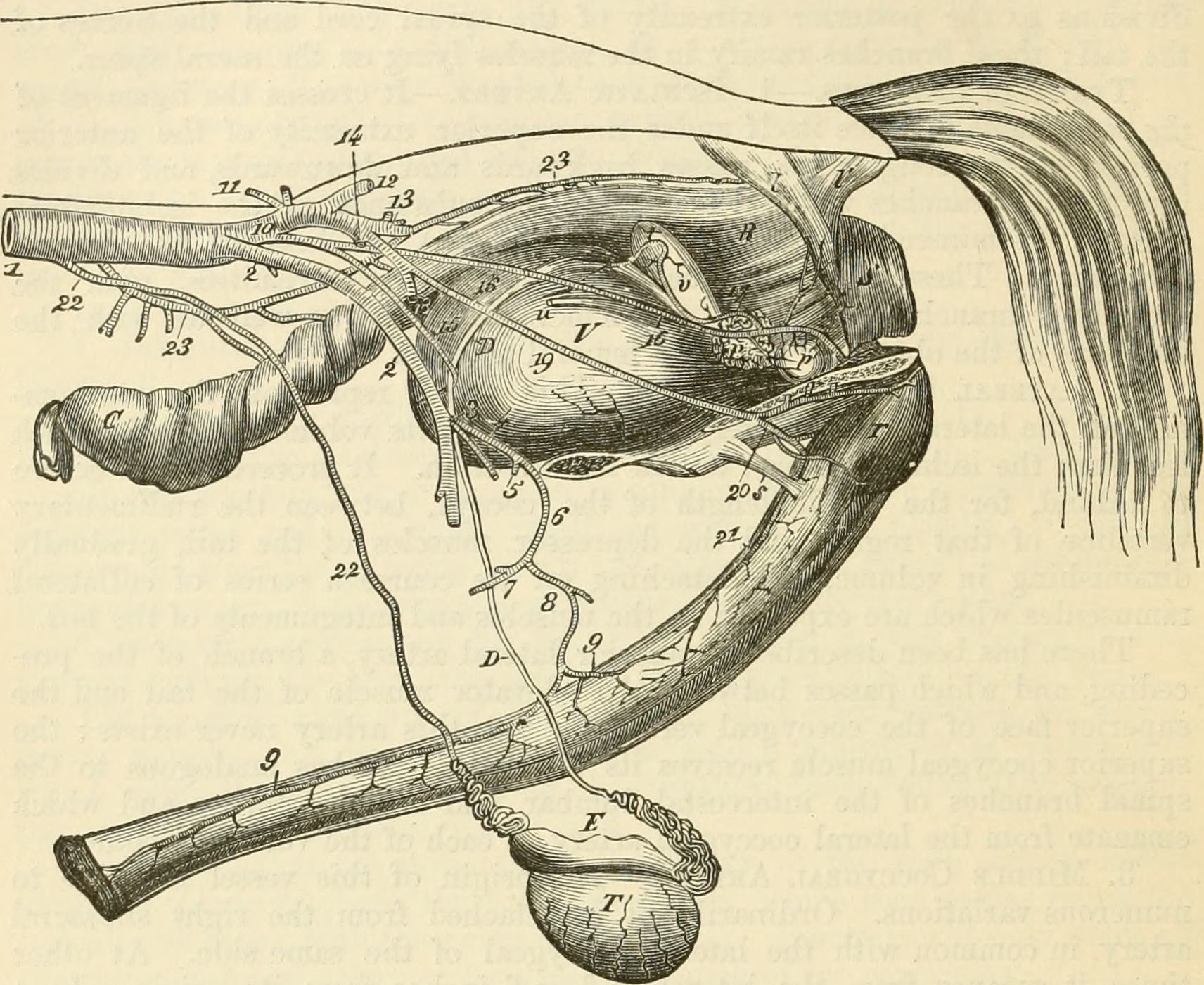
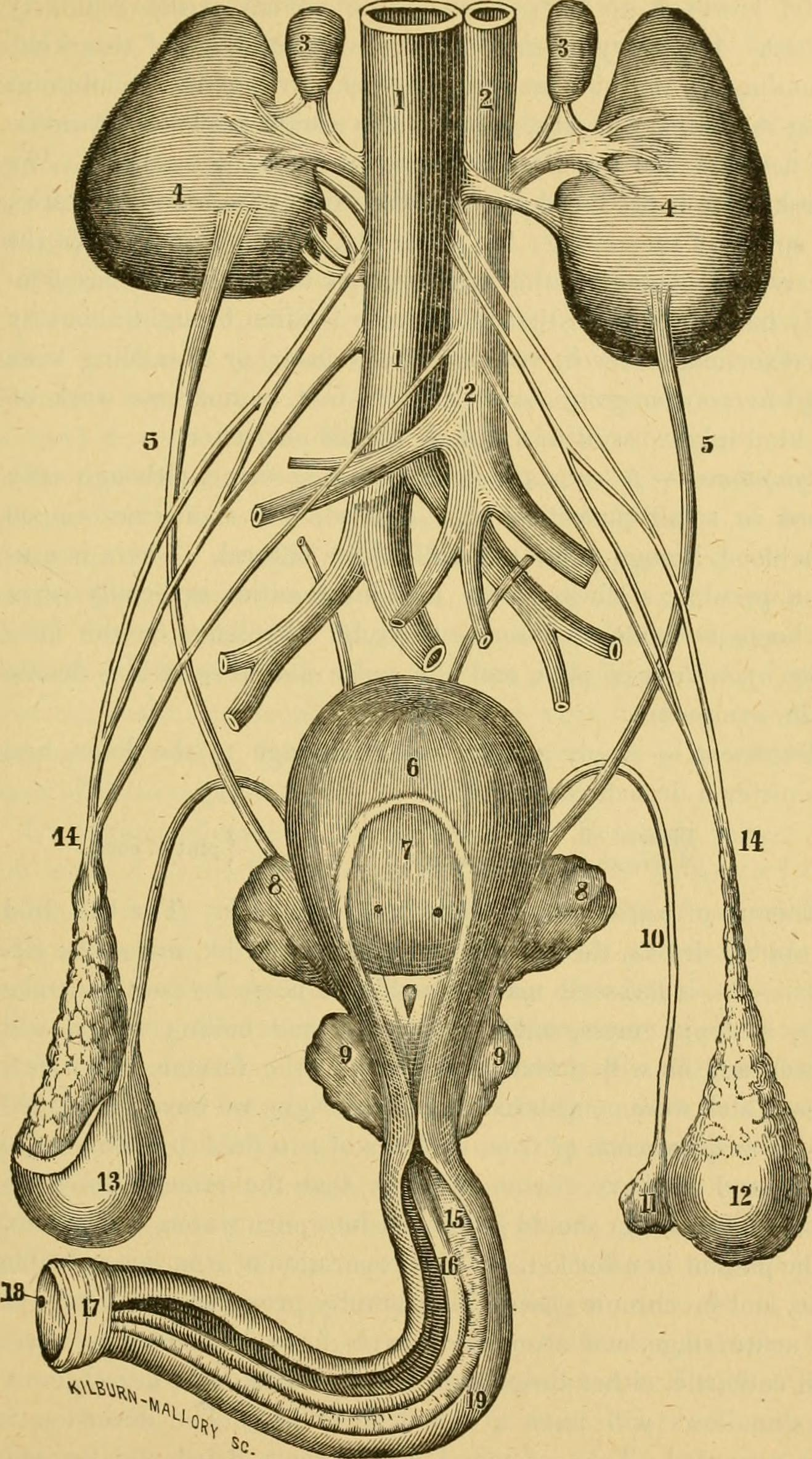
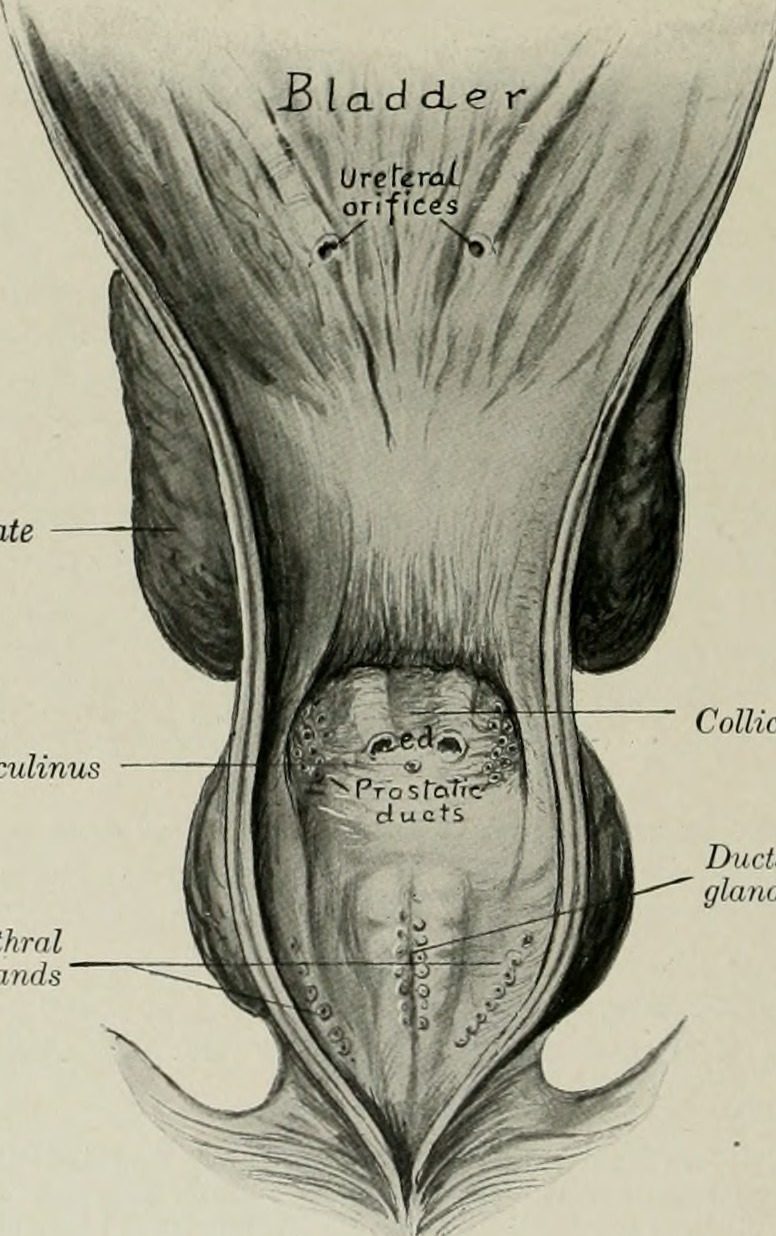
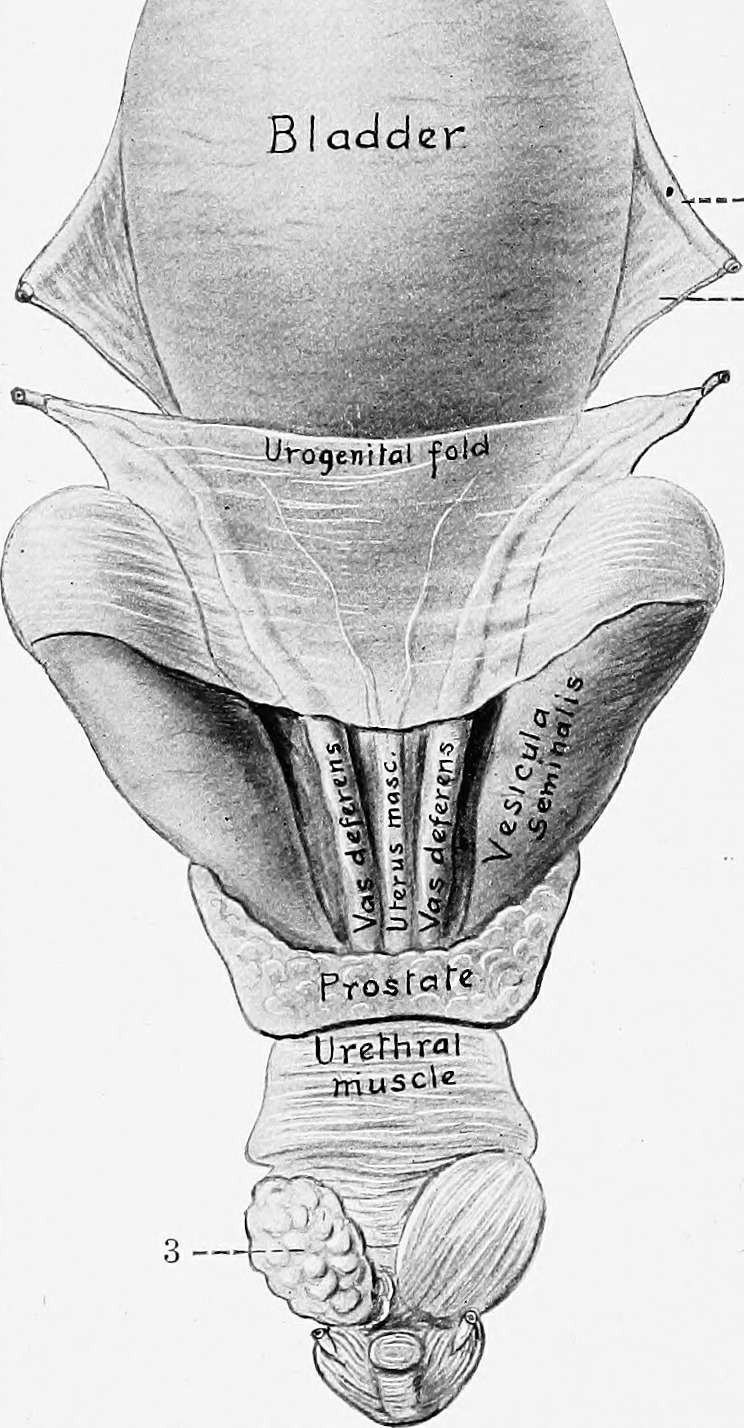
Genitourinary system of a stallion

The external genitalia comprise the testes and the penis.

The testes are suspended horizontally within the scrotum. The testes of an average stallion are ovoid, 8 to 12 cm (3 to 5 in) long, 6 to 7 cm (2.5 to 3 in) high, and 5 cm (2 in) wide.

Stallions have a musculocavernosus penis with a well-developed glans. When non-erect, it is quite flaccid and contained within the sheath. The retractor penis muscle is relatively underdeveloped. Erection and protrusion take place gradually, by the increasing tumescence of the erectile vascular tissue in the corpus cavernosum penis. When not erect, the penis is housed within the prepuce or penile sheath, 50 cm (20 in) long and 2.5 to 6 cm (1 to 2.5 in) in diameter with the distal end 15 to 20 cm (6 to 8 in) free in the prepuce. The retractor muscle contracts to retract the penis into the sheath and relaxes to allow the penis to extend from the sheath. When erect, the penis increases in length and thickness by 50% while the thickness of the glans increases by four to five times. The urethra opens within the urethral fossa, a small pouch at the distal end of the glans. A structure called the urethral process projects beyond the glans.

The internal genitalia comprise the accessory sex glands, which include the vesicular glands, the prostate gland and the bulbourethral glands. These contribute fluid to the semen at ejaculation, but are not strictly necessary for fertility.

== Management and handling of domesticated stallions ==
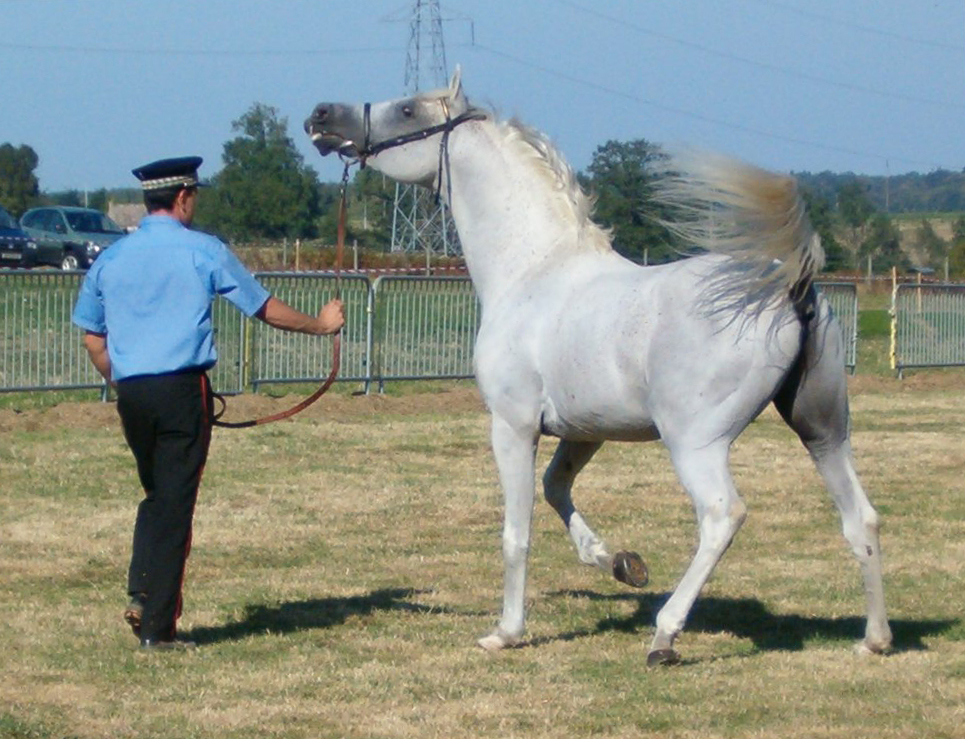
Even well-trained stallions require firm and consistent handling by experienced individuals.

Stallions are trained and managed in a variety of ways, depending on the region of the world, the owner's philosophy, and the individual stallion's temperament. In all cases, however, stallions have an inborn tendency to attempt to dominate both other horses and human handlers, and will be affected to some degree by proximity to other horses, especially mares in heat. They must be trained to behave with respect toward humans at all times or else their natural aggressiveness, particularly a tendency to bite, may pose a danger of serious injury.

The advantage of natural types of management is that the stallion is allowed to behave "like a horse" and may exhibit fewer stable vices. In a harem model, the mares may "cycle" or achieve estrus more readily. Proponents of natural management also assert that mares are more likely to become pregnant in a natural herd setting. Some stallion managers keep a stallion with a mare herd year-round, others will only turn a stallion out with mares during the breeding season.

In some places, young domesticated stallions are allowed to live separately in a "bachelor herd" while growing up, kept out of sight, sound or smell of mares. A Swiss study demonstrated that even mature breeding stallions kept well away from other horses could live peacefully together in a herd setting if proper precautions were taken while the initial herd hierarchy was established.

As an example, in the New Forest, England, breeding stallions run out on the open Forest for about two to three months each year with the mares and youngstock. On being taken off the Forest, many of them stay together in bachelor herds for most of the rest of the year. New Forest stallions, when not in their breeding work, take part on the annual round-ups, working alongside mares and geldings, and compete successfully in many disciplines.

There are drawbacks to natural management, however. One is that the breeding date, and hence foaling date, of any given mare will be uncertain. Another problem is the risk of injury to the stallion or mare in the process of natural breeding, or the risk of injury while a hierarchy is established within an all-male herd. Some stallions become very anxious or temperamental in a herd setting and may lose considerable weight, sometimes to the point of a health risk. Some may become highly protective of their mares and thus more aggressive and dangerous to handle. There is also a greater risk that the stallion may escape from a pasture or be stolen. Stallions may break down fences between adjoining fields to fight another stallion or mate with the "wrong" herd of mares, thus putting the pedigree of ensuing foals in question.

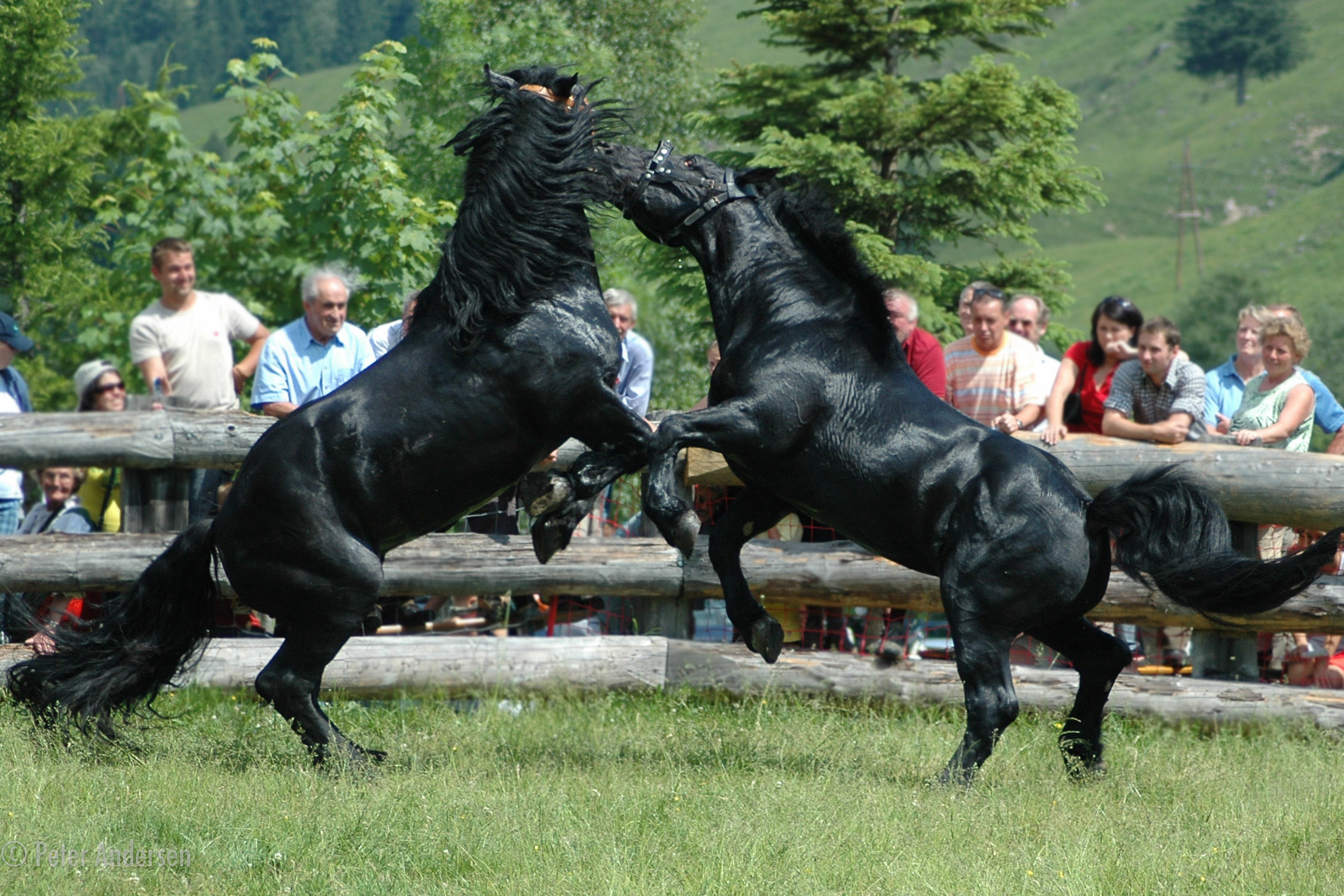
Aggressive and even violent behavior between stallions not habitually living together or in the presence of mares adds to the challenges in stallion management.

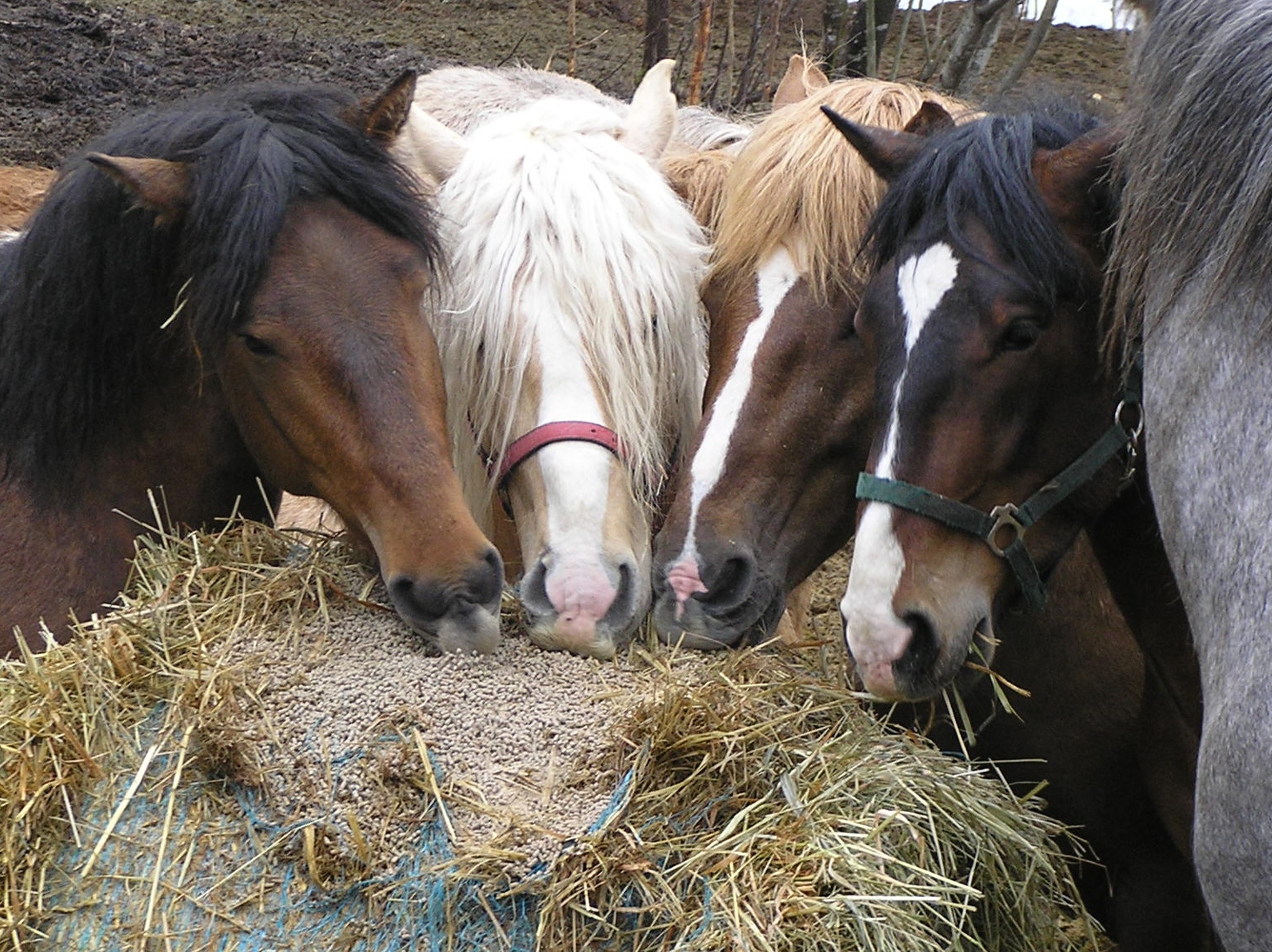
Provided with sufficient space and food with no distractions from mares in estrus, even stallions previously used for breeding may coexist peacefully. Not all individuals are suited for this kind of arrangement, however.

Complete isolation has significant drawbacks; stallions may develop additional behavior problems with aggression due to frustration and pent-up energy. As a general rule, a stallion that has been isolated from the time of weaning or sexual maturity will have a more difficult time adapting to a herd environment than one allowed to live close to other animals. As horses are instinctively social creatures, even stallions are believed to benefit from being allowed social interaction with other horses, though proper management and cautions are needed.

Properly trained stallions can live and work close to mares and to one another. Examples include the Lipizzan stallions of the Spanish Riding School in Vienna, Austria, where the entire group of stallions live part-time in a bachelor herd as young colts, then are stabled, train, perform, and travel worldwide as adults with few if any management problems. Even stallions who are unfamiliar with each other can work safely in reasonable proximity if properly trained; the vast majority of Thoroughbred horses on the racetrack are stallions, as are many equine athletes in other forms of competition. Stallions are often shown together in the same ring at horse shows, particularly in halter classes where their conformation is evaluated. In horse show performance competition, stallions and mares often compete in the same arena with one another, particularly in Western and English "pleasure"-type classes where horses are worked as a group. Overall, stallions can be trained to keep focused on work and may be brilliant performers if properly handled.

A breeding stallion is more apt to present challenging behavior to a human handler than one who has not bred mares, and stallions may be more difficult to handle in spring and summer, during the breeding season, than during the fall and winter. Some stallions are used for both riding and breeding at the same general time of year. Though compromises may need to be made in expectations for both athletic performance and fertility rate, well-trained stallions with good temperaments can be taught that breeding behavior is only allowed in a certain area, or with certain cues, equipment, or with a particular handler.

== Geldings ==
If a stallion is not to be used for breeding, castrating (gelding) the male horse will allow it to live full-time in a herd with both males and females, reduce aggressive or disruptive behavior, and allow the horse to be around other animals without being seriously distracted. If a horse is not to be used for breeding, it can be gelded prior to reaching sexual maturity. A horse gelded young may grow taller and behave better if this is done. Older stallions that are sterile or otherwise no longer used for breeding may also be gelded and will exhibit calmer behavior, even if previously used for breeding. However, they are more likely to continue stallion-like behaviors than horses gelded at a younger age, especially if they have been used as a breeding stallion. Modern surgical techniques allow castration to be performed on a horse of almost any age with relatively few risks.

In most cases, particularly in modern industrialized cultures, a male horse that is not of sufficient quality to be used for breeding will have a happier life without having to deal with the instinctive, hormone-driven behaviors that come with being left intact. Geldings are safer to handle and present fewer management problems.

Some in the animal rights community maintain that castration is mutilation and damaging to the animal's psyche.

=== Ridglings ===
A ridgling or "rig" is a cryptorchid, a stallion which has one or both testicles undescended. If both testicles are not descended, the horse may appear to be a gelding, but will still behave like a stallion. A gelding that displays stallion-like behaviors is sometimes called a "false rig". In many cases, ridglings are infertile, or have fertility levels that are significantly reduced. The condition is most easily corrected by gelding the horse. A more complex and costly surgical procedure can sometimes correct the condition and restore the animal's fertility, though it is only cost-effective for a horse that has very high potential as a breeding stallion. This surgery generally removes the non-descended testicle, leaving the descended testicle, and creating a horse known as a monorchid stallion. Keeping cryptorchids or surgically-created monorchids as breeding stallions is controversial, as the condition is at least partially genetic and some handlers claim that cryptorchids tend to have greater levels of behavioral problems than normal stallions.

== See also ==
- Horse behavior
- Horse breeding
