= Reproductive system =

System of organs used for reproduction

Details

Identifiers
- Latin: systemata genitalia
- TA98: A09.0.00.000
- TA2: 3467

The reproductive system of an organism, also known as the genital system, is the biological system made up of all the anatomical organs involved in sexual reproduction and asexual reproduction. Many non-living substances such as fluids, hormones, and pheromones are also important accessories to the reproductive system. Unlike most organ systems, the sexes of differentiated species often have significant differences. These differences allow for a combination of genetic material between two individuals, which allows for the possibility of greater genetic fitness of the offspring.

== Animals ==
In mammals, the major organs of the reproductive system include the external genitalia (penis and vulva) as well as a number of internal organs, including the gamete-producing gonads (testicles and ovaries). Diseases of the human reproductive system are very common and widespread, particularly communicable sexually transmitted infections.

Most other vertebrates have similar reproductive systems consisting of gonads, ducts, and openings. However, there is a great diversity of physical adaptations as well as reproductive strategies in every group of vertebrates.

=== Vertebrates ===
Vertebrates share key elements of their reproductive systems. They all have gamete-producing organs known as gonads. In females, these gonads are then connected by oviducts to an external opening, typically the cloaca or vagina.

==== Humans ====
Human reproduction involves internal fertilization. During sexual intercourse, semen is ejaculated from the male's erect penis into the female's vagina. The male's sperm travel through the vagina and cervix into the uterus or fallopian tubes to fertilize the ovum. After fertilization and implantation, gestation of the fetus occurs in the uterus for about nine months, known as pregnancy, Pregnancy ends with childbirth, when uterine muscles contract, the cervix dilates, and the baby exits through the vagina. Human babies need prolonged parental care, including lactation from female mammary glands in the breasts.

The female reproductive system has two functions: The first is to produce egg cells, and the second is to protect and nourish the offspring until birth. The male reproductive system has one function, and it is to produce and deposit sperm. Humans have a high level of sexual differentiation. In addition to differences in nearly every reproductive organ, numerous differences typically occur in secondary sexual characteristics.

===== Male =====
The male reproductive system is a series of organs located outside of the body and around the pelvic region of a male that contribute towards the reproduction process. The primary direct function of the male reproductive system is to provide the male sperm for fertilization of the ovum.

The major reproductive organs of the male can be grouped into three categories. The first category is sperm production and storage. Production takes place in the testicles, which are housed in the temperature regulating scrotum, immature sperm then travel to the epididymides for development and storage. The second category is the ejaculatory fluid-producing glands which include the seminal vesicles, prostate, and the vasa deferentia. The final category are those used for copulation, and deposition of the spermatozoa (sperm) within the male, these include the penis, urethra, vas deferens, and Cowper's gland.

Major secondary sex characteristics include larger, more muscular stature, deepened voice, facial and body hair, broad shoulders, and development of an Adam's apple. An important sexual hormone of males is androgen, and particularly testosterone.

The testes release a hormone that controls the development of sperm. This hormone is also responsible for the development of physical characteristics in men such as facial hair and a deep voice.

===== Female =====
The human female reproductive system is a series of organs primarily located inside of the body and around the pelvic region of a female that contribute towards the reproductive process. The human female reproductive system contains three main parts: the vulva, which leads to the vagina, the vaginal opening, to the uterus; the uterus, which holds the developing fetus; and the ovaries, which produce the female's ova. The breasts are involved during the parenting stage of reproduction, but in most classifications they are not considered to be part of the female reproductive system.

The vagina meets the outside at the vulva, which also includes the labia, clitoris and urethra; during intercourse, this area is lubricated by mucus secreted by the Bartholin's glands. The vagina is attached to the uterus through the cervix, while the uterus is attached to the ovaries via the fallopian tubes. Each ovary contains hundreds of ova (singular ovum).

Approximately every 28 days, the pituitary gland releases a hormone that stimulates some of the ova to develop and grow. One ovum is released and it passes through the fallopian tube into the uterus. Hormones produced by the ovaries prepare the uterus to receive the ovum. The ovum will move through her fallopian tubes and awaits the sperm for fertilization to occur. When this does not occur, i.e. no sperm for fertilization, the lining of the uterus, called the endometrium, and unfertilized ova are shed each cycle through the process of menstruation. If the ovum is fertilized by sperm, it will attach to the endometrium and embryonic development will begin.

==== Other mammals ====
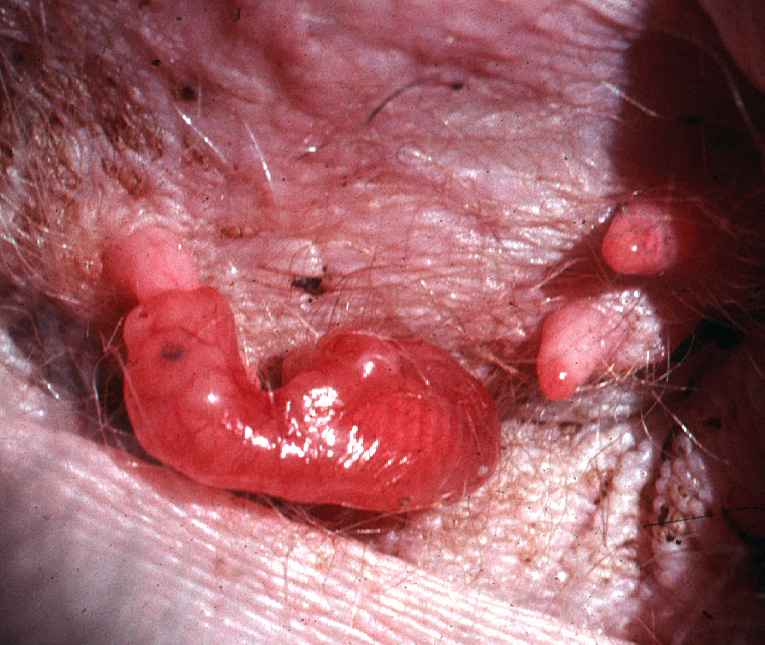
A newborn joey suckles from a teat found within its mother's pouch

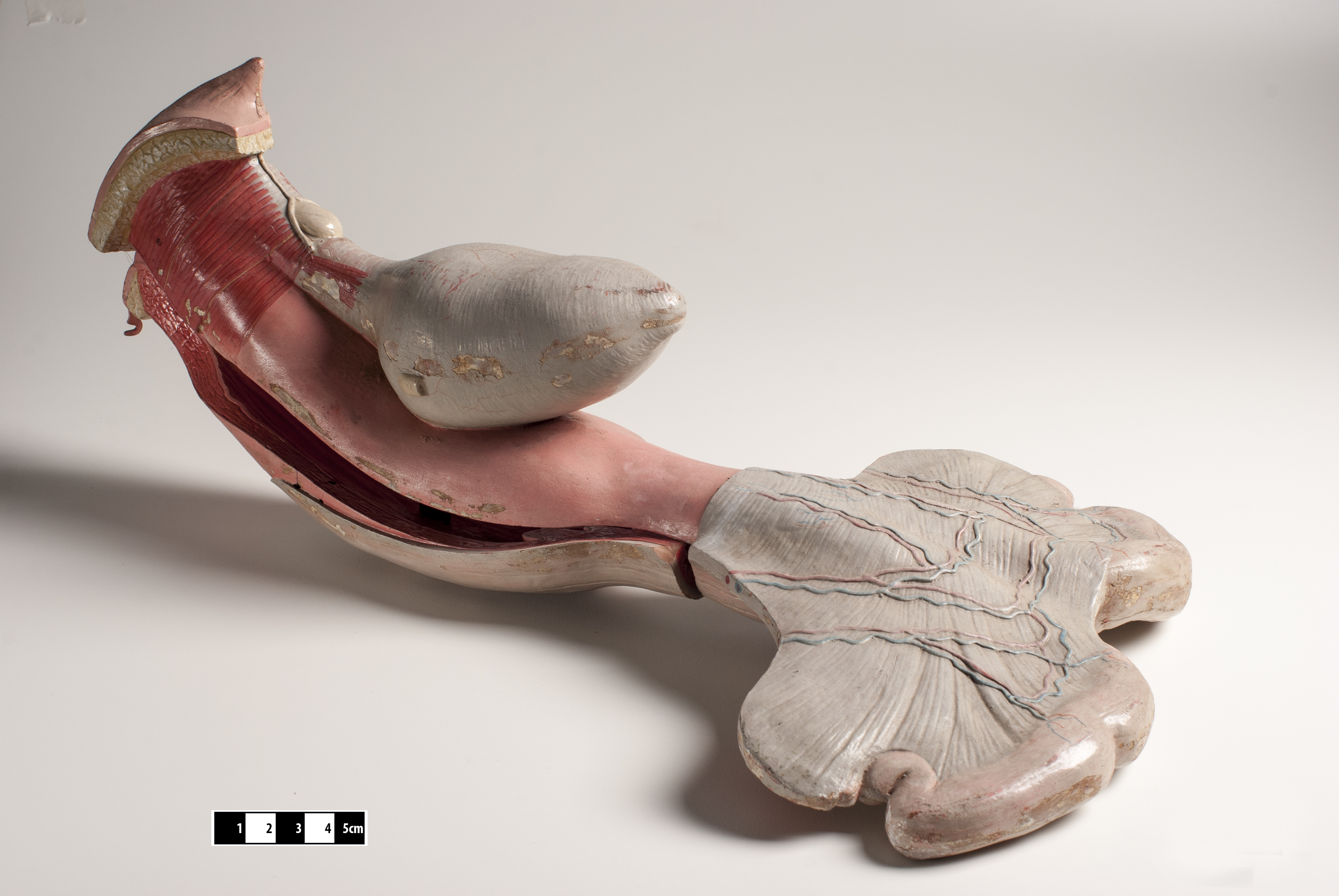
Didactic model of a mammal urogenital system.

Most mammal reproductive systems are similar, however, there are some notable differences between the non-human mammals and humans. For instance, most male mammals have a penis which is stored internally until erect, and most have a penis bone or baculum. Additionally, both males and females of most species do not remain continually sexually fertile as humans do and the females of most mammalian species don't grow permanent mammaries like human females do either. Like humans, most groups of mammals have descended testicles found within a scrotum, however, others have descended testicles that rest on the ventral body wall, and a few groups of mammals, such as elephants, have undescended testicles found deep within their body cavities near their kidneys.

The reproductive system of marsupials is unique in that the female has two vaginae, both of which open externally through one orifice but lead to different compartments within the uterus; males usually have a two-pronged penis, which corresponds to the females' two vaginae. Marsupials typically develop their offspring in an external pouch containing teats to which their newborn young (joeys) attach themselves for post uterine development. Also, marsupials have a unique prepenial scrotum. The 15 mm (5/8 in) long newborn joey instinctively crawls and wriggles the 15 cm (6 in), while clinging to fur, on the way to its mother's pouch.

In regards to males, the mammalian penis has a similar structure in reptiles and a small percentage of birds while the scrotum is only present in mammals. Regarding females, the vulva is unique to mammals with no homologue in birds, reptiles, amphibians, or fish. The clitoris, however, can be found in some reptiles and birds. In place of the uterus and vagina, non-mammal vertebrate groups have an unmodified oviduct leading directly to a cloaca, which is a shared exit-hole for gametes, urine, and feces. Monotremes (i.e. platypus and echidnas), a group of egg-laying mammals, also lack a uterus, vagina, and vulva, and in that respect have a reproductive system resembling that of a reptile.

===== Dogs =====
In domestic canines, sexual maturity (puberty) occurs between the ages of 6 and 12 months for both males and females, although this can be delayed until up to two years of age for some large breeds.

===== Horses =====
The mare's reproductive system is responsible for controlling gestation, birth, and lactation, as well as her estrous cycle and mating behavior. The stallion's reproductive system is responsible for his sexual behavior and secondary sex characteristics (such as a large crest).

===== Even-toed ungulates =====
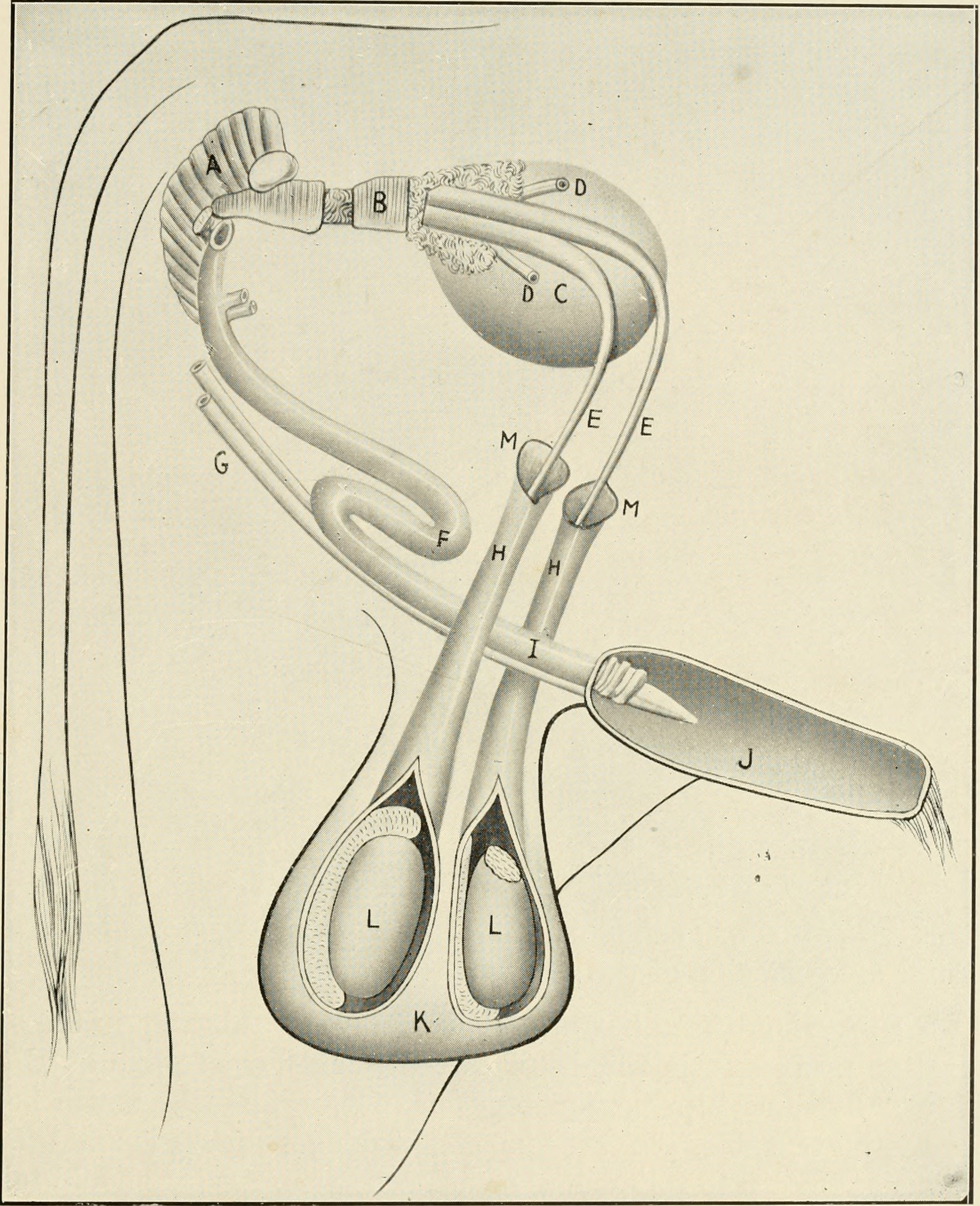
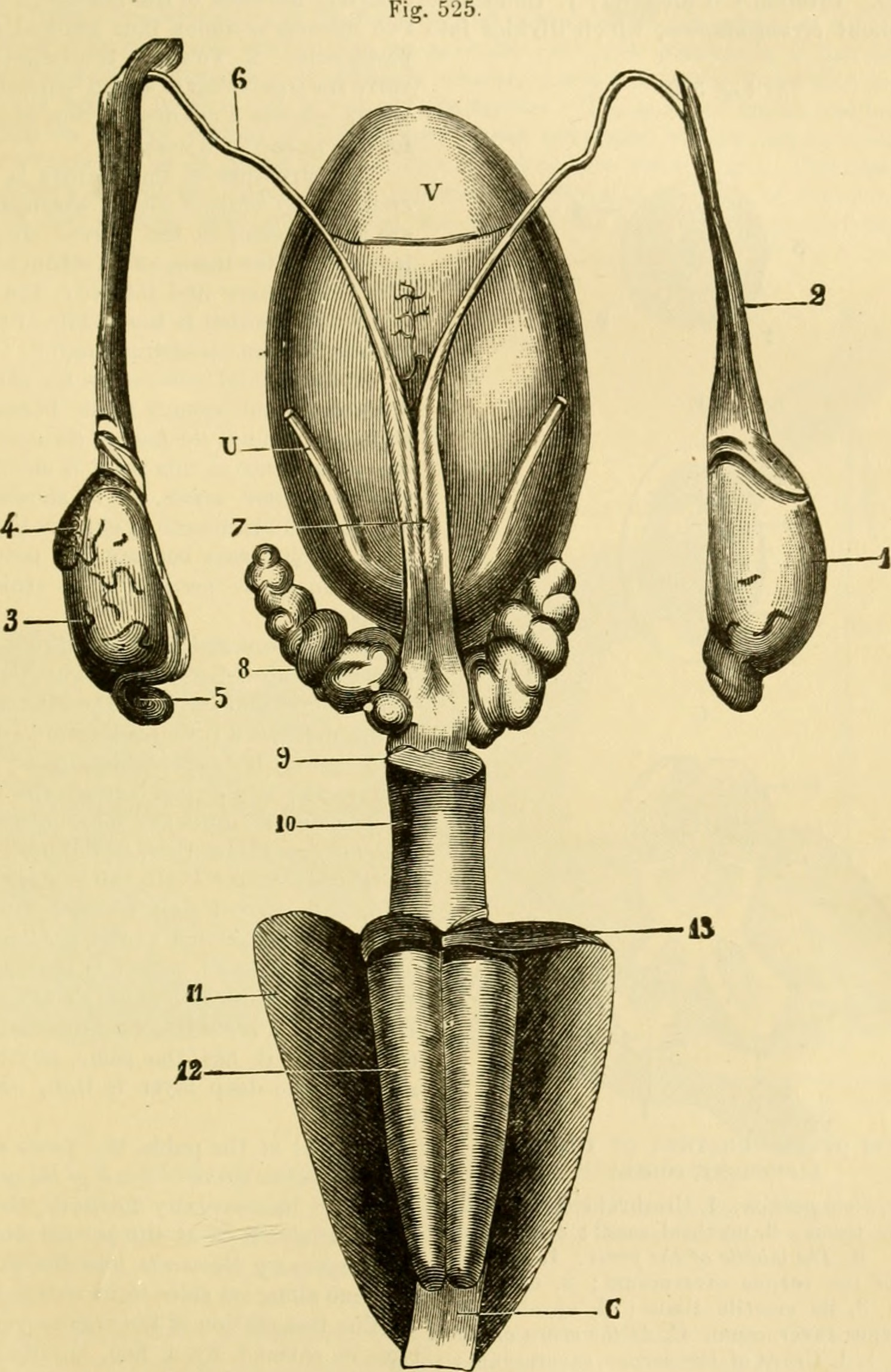
Genitourinary system of a bull

The penises of even-toed ungulates have an S-shape at rest and lie in a pocket under the skin on the belly. The corpora cavernosa are only slightly developed; and an erection mainly causes this curvature to extend, which leads to an extension, but not a thickening, of the penis. Cetaceans have similar penises. In some even-toed ungulates, the penis contains a structure called the urethral process or penile vermiform appendix.

The testicles are located in the scrotum and thus outside the abdominal cavity. The ovaries of many females descend as the testicles descend of many male mammals, and are close to the pelvic inlet at the level of the fourth lumbar vertebra. The uterus has two horns (uterus bicornis).

==== Birds ====
Male and female birds have a cloaca, an opening through which eggs, sperm, and wastes pass. Intercourse is performed by pressing the lips of the cloacae together, which is sometimes known as an intromittent organ which is known as a phallus that is analogous to the mammals' penis. The female lays amniotic eggs in which the young fetus continues to develop after it leaves the female's body. Unlike most vertebrates, female birds typically have only one functional ovary and oviduct. As a group, birds, like mammals, are noted for their high level of parental care.

==== Reptiles ====
Reptiles are almost all sexually dimorphic, and exhibit internal fertilization through the cloaca. Some reptiles lay eggs while others are ovoviviparous (animals that deliver live young). Reproductive organs are found within the cloaca of reptiles. Most male reptiles have copulatory organs, which are usually retracted or inverted and stored inside the body. In turtles and crocodilians, the male has a single median penis-like organ, while male snakes and lizards each possess a pair of penis-like organs.

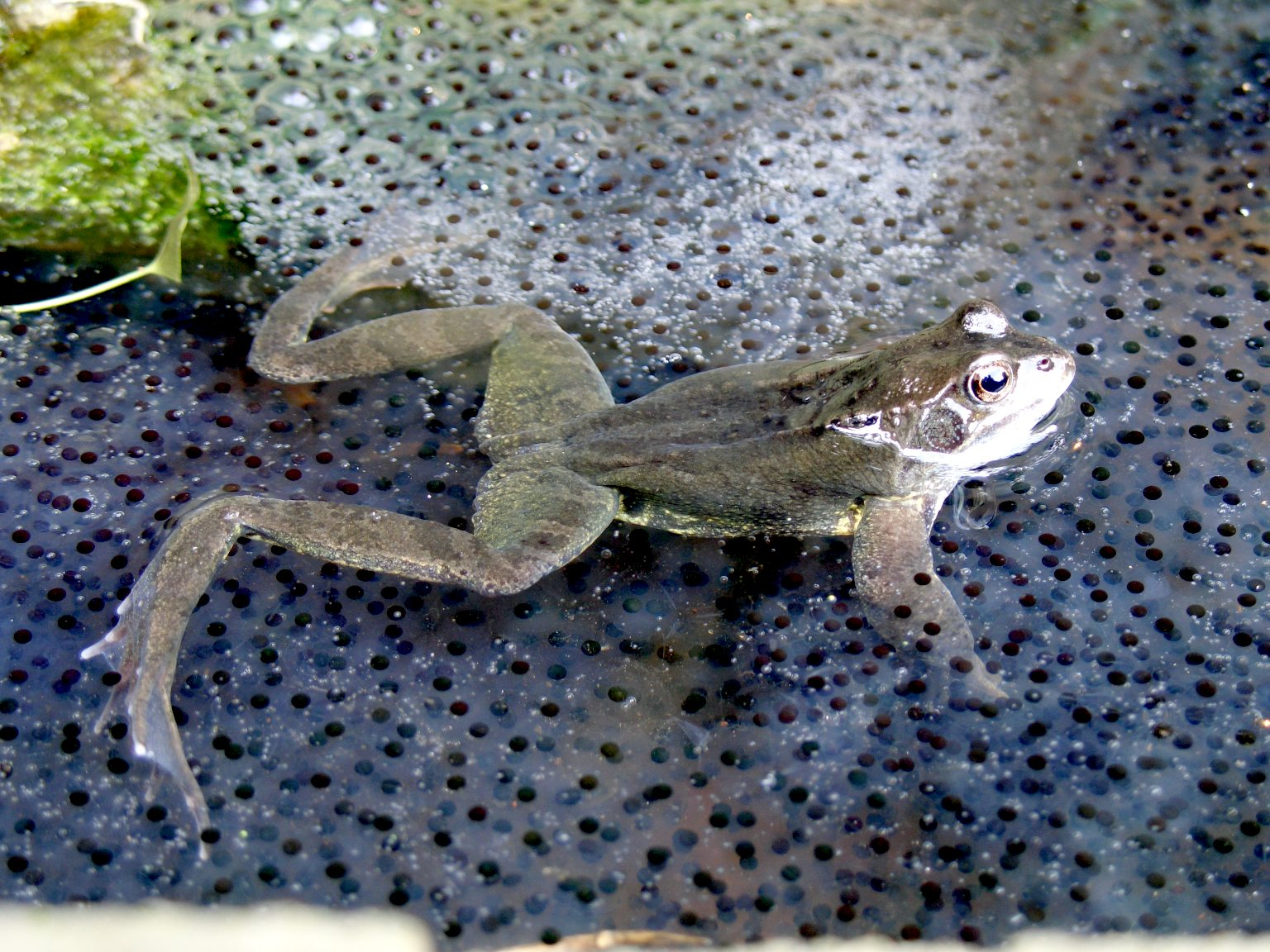
A male common frog in nuptial colors waiting for more females to come in a mass of spawn

==== Amphibians ====
Most amphibians exhibit external fertilization of eggs, typically within the water, though some amphibians such as caecilians have internal fertilization. All have paired, internal gonads, connected by ducts to the cloaca.

==== Fish ====
Fish exhibit a wide range of different reproductive strategies. Most fish, however, are oviparous and exhibit external fertilization. In this process, females use their cloaca to release large quantities of their gametes, called spawn into the water and one or more males release "milt", a white fluid containing many sperm over the unfertilized eggs. Other species of fish are oviparous and have internal fertilization aided by pelvic or anal fins that are modified into an intromittent organ analogous to the human penis. A small portion of fish species are either viviparous or ovoviviparous, and are collectively known as livebearers.

Fish gonads are typically pairs of either ovaries or testicles. Most fish are sexually dimorphic but some species are hermaphroditic or unisexual.

=== Invertebrates ===
Invertebrates have an extremely diverse array of reproductive systems, the only commonality may be that they all lay eggs. Also, aside from cephalopods and arthropods, nearly all other invertebrates exhibit external fertilization.

==== Cephalopods ====
All cephalopods are sexually dimorphic and reproduce by laying eggs. Most cephalopods have semi-internal fertilization, in which the male places his gametes inside the female's mantle cavity or pallial cavity to fertilize the ova found in the female's single ovary. Likewise, male cephalopods have only a single testicle. In the female of most cephalopods the nidamental glands aid in development of the egg.

The "penis" in most unshelled male cephalopods (Coleoidea) is a long and muscular end of the gonoduct used to transfer spermatophores to a modified arm called a hectocotylus. That in turn is used to transfer the spermatophores to the female. In species where the hectocotylus is missing, the "penis" is long and able to extend beyond the mantle cavity and transfer the spermatophores directly to the female.

==== Insects ====
Most insects reproduce oviparously, i.e. by laying eggs. The eggs are produced by the female in a pair of ovaries. Sperm, produced by the male in one testis or more commonly two, is transmitted to the female during mating by means of external genitalia. The sperm is stored within the female in one or more spermathecae. At the time of fertilization, the eggs travel along oviducts to be fertilized by the sperm and are then expelled from the body ("laid"), in most cases via an ovipositor.

==== Arachnids ====
Arachnids may have one or two gonads, which are located in the abdomen. The genital opening is usually located on the underside of the second abdominal segment. In most species, the male transfers sperm to the female in a package, or spermatophore. Complex courtship rituals have evolved in many arachnids to ensure the safe delivery of the sperm to the female.

Arachnids usually lay yolky eggs, which hatch into immatures that resemble adults. Scorpions, however, are either ovoviviparous or viviparous, depending on species, and bear live young.

== Plants ==
Among all living organisms, flowers, which are the reproductive structures of angiosperms, are the most varied physically and show a correspondingly great diversity in methods of reproduction. Plants that are not flowering plants (green algae, mosses, liverworts, hornworts, ferns and gymnosperms such as conifers) also have complex interplays between morphological adaptation and environmental factors in their sexual reproduction. The breeding system, or how the sperm from one plant fertilizes the ovum of another, depends on the reproductive morphology, and is the single most important determinant of the genetic structure of nonclonal plant populations. Christian Konrad Sprengel (1793) studied the reproduction of flowering plants and for the first time it was understood that the pollination process involved both biotic and abiotic interactions.

== Fungi ==
Fungal reproduction is complex, reflecting the differences in lifestyles and genetic makeup within this diverse kingdom of organisms. It is estimated that a third of all fungi reproduce using more than one method of propagation; for example, reproduction may occur in two well-differentiated stages within the life cycle of a species, the teleomorph and the anamorph. Environmental conditions trigger genetically determined developmental states that lead to the creation of specialized structures for sexual or asexual reproduction. These structures aid reproduction by efficiently dispersing spores or spore-containing propagules.

== See also ==
- Major systems of the human body
- Reproductive system disease
- Human sexuality
- Human sexual behavior
- Plant sexuality
- Meiosis
