= Penile sheath =

Non-human mammal foreskin

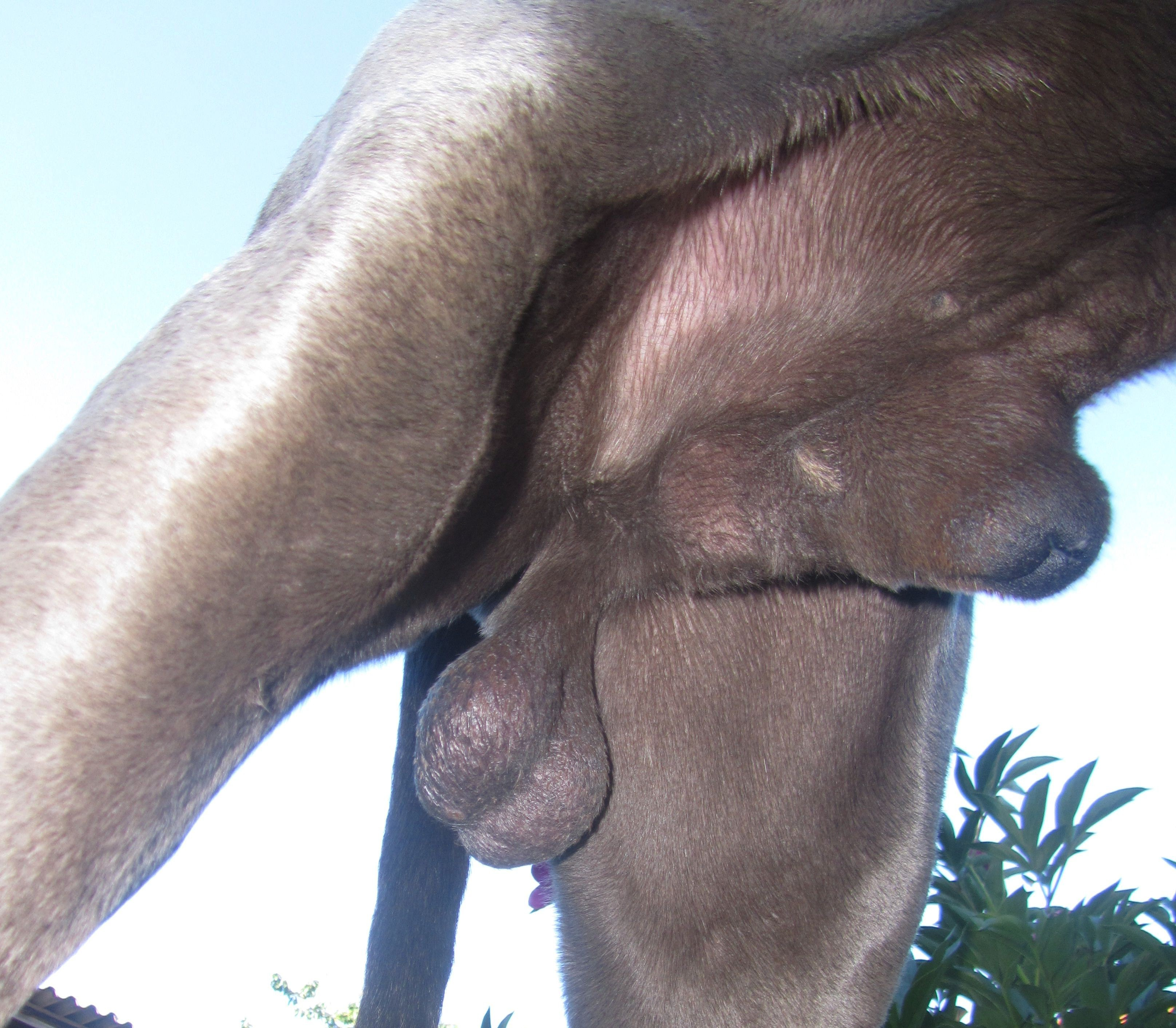
Penile sheath of a Great Dane

Almost all mammal penises have prepuces. In non-human mammals, the prepuce is sometimes called the penile sheath or preputial sheath.

In koalas, the foreskin contains naturally occurring bacteria that play an important role in fertilization. In some bat species, the prepuce contains an erectile tissue structure called the accessory corpus cavernosum.

During musth, a male elephant may urinate with the penis still in the sheath, which causes the urine to spray on the hind legs.

Male dogs and wild dogs have a large and conspicuous penile sheath.

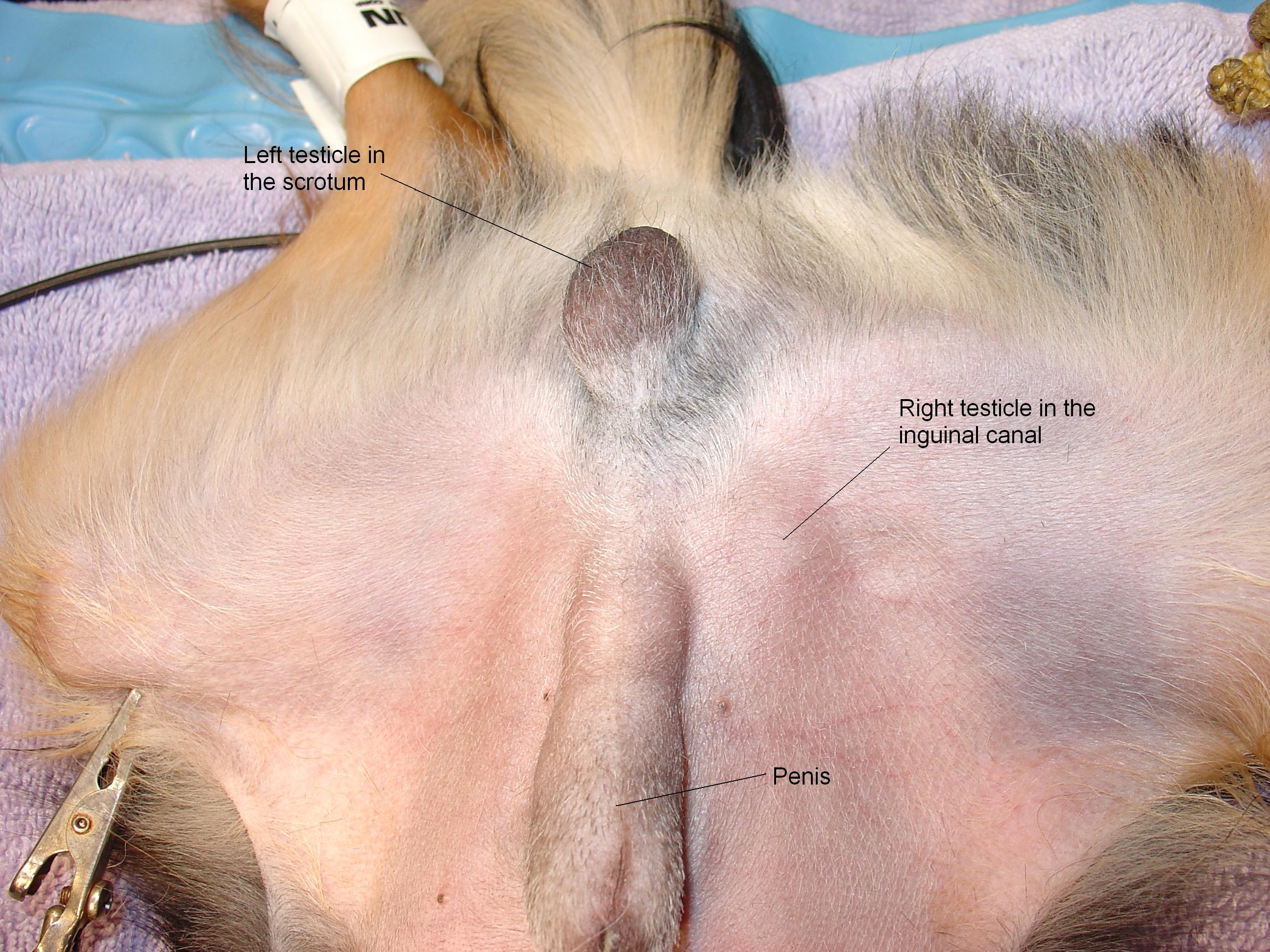
Penile sheath of a Chihuahua with cryptorchidism

In stallions, the retractor penis muscle contracts to retract the stallion's penis into the sheath and relaxes to allow the penis to extend from the sheath.

The penile sheath of a male axis deer is elongated and urine-stained. When rubbing trees with their antlers, these stags sometimes move the penis back and forth rapidly inside its sheath. Male bison and fallow deer have tufts of fur at the end of their penile sheaths.

In rodents, the length of the prepuce is related to urine marking behavior.

== See also ==
- Clitoral sheath
- Horse sheath cleaning
- Preputial gland
