= Retractor muscle of the penis =

Anatomical feature of male carnivoran, marsupial and ungulate mammals

In some animals, the male penis possesses a muscle enabling retraction into the prepuce.

== In particular animals ==
The retractor penis muscle occurs in marsupials and carnivorans, but it is absent in humans. A stag's penis forms an S-shaped curve when it is not erect, and is retracted into its preputial sheath by the retractor penis muscle.

In Tandonia, the retractor penis inserts at the boundary between the penis and epiphallus.

In stallions, the retractor penis muscle is relatively underdeveloped. The retractor muscle contracts to retract the penis into the sheath and relaxes to allow the penis to extend from the sheath.

In bulls, protrusion is not affected much by erection, but more by relaxation of the retractor penis muscle and straightening of the sigmoid flexure.
