= Nidamental gland =

Organs that participate in egg material production

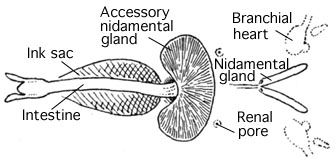
Ventral view of the viscera of Chtenopteryx sicula, showing the presence of the nidamental glands and accessory nidamental glands.

Nidamental glands are internal organs found in some elasmobranchs and certain molluscs, including cephalopods (specifically Decapodiformes and nautiluses) and gastropods.

In cephalopods, nidamental glands are large, paired glandular structures found in the mantle cavity. Accessory nidamental glands may also be present. Nidamental glands are composed of lamellae and are involved in the secretion of egg cases or the gelatinous substance comprising egg masses.

They are also found in phoronids.

== Culinary uses ==
Nidamental glands of cuttlefish are eaten as food in various parts of the world, included either in dishes in which the whole animal is consumed, or separately. In southern Spain, for example, they are cooked whole and known as huevos de choco and there is a popular notion that these organs are the gonads of the male cuttlefish.
