= Bulb (disambiguation) =

Bulb or Bulbs may refer to:

== Common uses ==
- Bulb, a food-storage structure within some plants
  - Ornamental bulb, a kind of perennial plant
- Light bulb, an electric lamp

== Maritime ==
- Bulb keel, a type of keel
- Bulbous bow, a part that sticks out in front of a bow and below the water line

== Music ==
- "Bulbs" (song), Van Morrison's 1974 song
- Bulb Records, a record label in Michigan
- The stage name of Misha Mansoor as a solo music artist

== Science and technology ==
- A shortened name for Bulbophyllum, a genus of orchids
- An old fashioned term for the medulla oblongata
- Flash bulb, one type of flash used in photography
- Rubber bulb, part of an eye dropper, which is also known as a dropper or pipette
- The bulb setting on some cameras

== Other uses ==
- Bulb Energy, a British-based energy supplier (2013–2023)
- The Better Use of Light Bulbs Act (BULB Act), an unenacted U.S. federal legislative proposal
- Bulbs, a slang term for testicles
  - Bulbus glandis

== See also ==
- Blub (disambiguation)
- Bulbus (disambiguation), various bulb-shaped objects
