= Pseudovitamin B12 =

Chemical similar in structure to vitamin B12

- Pseudovitamin B_{12} in its cyano form

Names
- Other names: β-Cobalamin; Adenine cobamide; Coα-[α-(7-adenyl)]-Coβ-cobamide

Identifiers
CAS Number	13408-75-8
3D model (JSmol)	Interactive image
Beilstein Reference	10761681
ChEBI	CHEBI:48568
ChemSpider	31150272
PubChem CID	138756686
- InChI: InChI=1S/C58H85N16O14P.CN.Co/c1-26(87-89(84,85)88-47-34(23-75)86-53(46(47)83)74-25-69-52-45(74)51(65)67-24-68-52)22-66-42(82)16-17-55(6)32(18-39(62)79)50-58(9)57(8,21-41(64)81)31(12-15-38(61)78)44(73-58)28(3)49-56(7,20-40(63)80)29(10-13-36(59)76)33(70-49)19-35-54(4,5)30(11-14-37(60)77)43(71-35)27(2)48(55)72-50;1-2;/h19,24-26,29-32,34,46-47,50,53,75,83H,10-18,20-23H2,1-9H3,(H17,59,60,61,62,63,64,65,66,67,68,70,71,72,73,76,77,78,79,80,81,82,84,85);;/q;;+2/p-2/t26-,29-,30-,31-,32+,34-,46-,47-,50-,53+,55-,56+,57+,58+;;/m1../s1 Key: SEIQEEFQSMTJKO-IOOXTKEKSA-L
- SMILES: N#[C-][Co+3]1234[N]5=CN(C=6C(=NC=NC65)N)C7OC(CO)C(OP(=O)([O-])OC(C)CNC(=O)CCC8(C9=C(C%10=[N]4C(=CC%11=[N]3C(=C(C%12=[N]2C(C)(C([N-]91)C8CC(=O)N)C(C)(CC(=O)N)C%12CCC(=O)N)C)C(C)(CC(=O)N)C%11CCC(=O)N)C(C)(C)C%10CCC(=O)N)C)C)C7O

Properties
Chemical formula	C_{59}H_{83}CoN_{17}O_{14}P
Molar mass	1344.325 g·mol^{−1}
- Except where otherwise noted, data are given for materials in their standard state (at 25 °C [77 °F], 100 kPa). Infobox references

Pseudovitamin B_{12} is a structural analog of cobalamin, a natural corrinoid with a structure similar to the vitamin B_{12} group of vitamers. It has no vitamin activity in humans, but can act as a cofactor in some microbial enzymes. Pseudovitamin B_{12} is the majority corrinoid in spirulina, an algal dietary supplement sometimes erroneously claimed as having this vitamin activity.

== Chemical structure ==
Pseudovitamin B_{12} is a coordination complex of cobalt, which occupies the center of a corrin ligand and is further bound to an adenosine-containing sidechain. The sixth ("upper") ligand for the metal is alternatively cyano, methyl, hydroxo, or a second adenosyl group. All these analogs are biologically inactive in humans.

Compared to cobalamin (vitamin B_{12}), pseudovitamin B_{12} has the "lower" ligand, 5,6-dimethylbenzimidazole (DMB), replaced with adenine.

== Occurrence ==
Most cyanobacteria, including Spirulina, and some algae, such as Porphyra tenera (used to make a dried seaweed food called nori in Japan), have been found to contain mostly pseudovitamin B_{12} instead of biologically active B_{12}. These pseudo-vitamin compounds can be found in some types of shellfish, in edible insects, and at times as metabolic breakdown products of cyanocobalamin added to dietary supplements and fortified foods.

Pseudovitamin B_{12} can act as a coenzyme in a similar way to normal vitamin B_{12} when a microbiological assay with Lactobacillus delbrueckii subsp. lactis is used, as that bacteria can utilize the pseudovitamin despite it being unavailable to humans. To get a reliable reading of B_{12} content, more advanced techniques are available. One such technique involves pre-separation by silica gel and then assessment with B_{12}-dependent E. coli bacteria.

Pseudovitamin B_{12} is the main corrin cofactor produced by Clostridium cochlearium, Limosilactobacillus reuteri, and the methanogenic methanococcales and Methanoplanus under anaerobic conditions, and by the cyanobacteria Nostoc commune and Aphanizomenon flos-aquae.

Despite production of this compound in groups as distantly related as lactic acid bacteria and cyanobacteria, DMB is preferred over adenine by the vast majority of versions of CobT, the enzyme responsible for making the active phosphoribosylated lower sidechain of cobalamin.

Salmonella enterica is able to make either B_{12} or pseudovitamin B_{12} depending on the availability of DMB. Its enzymes prefer DMB, but it remains able to grow when DMB is unavailable and pseudo-B_{12} has to be made instead.

== Activity as enzyme cofactor ==
In organisms that produce pseudovitamin B_{12}, it takes the same role as vitamin B_{12} does in humans: as a corrin cofactor that facilitates the function of enzymes. Pseudovitamin B_{12} is also functional in some non-corrin-producing relatives of organisms that produce pseudovitamin B_{12}. This includes Lactobacillus delbrueckii subsp. lactis (LLD), which is in the same family as Limosilactobacillus reuteri. LLD is also able to use factor S and factor A (see § Other human-inactive cobamides below).

Cobalamide-dependent growth behavior of Sinorhizobium meliloti largely correlates with the cofactor binding selectivity of its methylmalonyl-CoA mutase (MCM). Among adenyl-cobamides, paseudovitamin B_{12} does not bind to its MCM, factor A (see below) does slightly, and vitamin B_{12} binds well.

Human apo-methionine synthase (MS) is able to be activated by methyl-pseudovitamin B_{12} in vitro (in solution). Apo-MS is extremely unselective of cofactors: It is activated by all tested cobamides (vitamin B_{12}). It appears to only require the central cobalt atom to have an oxidation state of +2. Hydroxo-pseudovitamin B_{12} is able to activate the MS in COS-7 cells, but unlike hydroxo-vitamin B_{12}, it does not increase the translation of MS (hydroxo-B_{12} achieves this by binding to the internal ribosome entry site of MS mRNA).

Human methylmalonyl-CoA mutase (MCM) normally relies on the adenosyl form of vitamin B_{12}. It binds and works with some vitamin B_{12} analogs in vitro (in solution), but not purinyl ones such as pseudovitamin B_{12}. Adenyl-pseudovitamin B_{12} does not function as a cofactor or inhibitor of MCM in COS-7 cells.

== Interaction with vitamin B_{12}-binding proteins and transporters ==
Human (mamallian in general) intrinsic factor binds pseudovitamin B_{12} with 500-fold lower affinity than to its usual target, vitamin B_{12}. This prevents mammals from absorbing trace amounts of pseudovitamin B_{12} from food. Factor III (see below) has a remarkable 80% affinity relative to vitamin B_{12}.

Another protein involved in the absorption of vitamin B_{12} is haptocorrin. Human haptocorrin binds pseudovitamin B_{12} with the same affinity as vitamin B_{12}. It is the least selective protein among all three human vitamin B_{12}-binding proteins.

Transcobalamin II (TCN2) is responsible for carrying vitamin B_{12} around in blood and into cells. It is relatively unselective, with pseudovitamin B_{12} showing 80% relative affinity. There is a concern that excess pseudovitamin B_{12} may compete with vitamin B_{12} for available TCN2. In COS-7 cells, 10 nM of pseudovitamin B_{12} in the culture medium inhibits the uptake of 1 nM vitamin B_{12}. Pseudovitamin B_{12} is not able to show inhibition when vitamin B_{12} is more abundant..

== Other vitamin B_{12} analogs ==
Alternative bases found in vitamin B_{12} (1), factor III (2), factor IIIm (3), pseudovitamin B_{12} (4), factor A (5) and factor S (6)

=== Other human-inactive cobamides ===
Factor S (2-methylmercaptoadenyl cobamide), which differs from pseudo-B_{12} by the addition of a methylmercapto (-S-CH_{3}) group, is found alongside pseudovitamin B_{12} in crickets. It is presumed to have been made by the gut bacteria of crickets. It is also the predominant corrinoid in human feces. It is also found in escargot.

Factor A (2-methyladenyl cobamide), which differs from pseudo-B_{12} by the addition of a methyl (-CH_{3}) group, is found in crickets.

Factor IIIm (methoxybenzimidazolyl cobamide) is found in escargot. It differs from vitamin B_{12} by the removal of a methyl (-CH_{3}) group and the replacement of a methyl group with a methoxy (-O-CH_{3}) group. Factor III (5-hydroxybenzimidazolyl-cobamide), which differs from factor IIIm by the replacement of methoxy with hydroxy (-OH), is common in methanogenic bacteria.

Thermal decomposition of all six of these corrinoids results in the same material, since the sidechain cleaves at the phosphate ester which attaches them to the main heterocycle.

=== Antivitamin B_{12} ===
A related concept is antivitamin B_{12} – compounds (often synthetic) that not only have no vitamin action, but also actively interfere with the activity of true vitamin B_{12}. The design of these compounds mainly involves the replacement of the metal ion with rhodium, nickel, or zinc; the attachment may have an inactive ligand such as 4-ethylphenyl. These compounds may be used to analyze B_{12} utilization pathways or to attack B_{12}-dependent pathogens.
