= Mating plug =

Gelatinous secretion used in the mating of some species

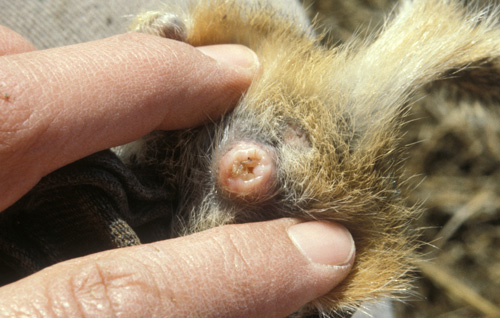
A mating plug in a female Richardson's ground squirrel (Urocitellus richardsonii)

A mating plug, also known as a copulation plug, vaginal plug, sperm plug, or sphragis (Latin, from Ancient Greek: σφραγίς sphragis, "a seal"), is a gelatinous secretion used in the mating of some species. It is deposited by a male into a female genital tract, such as the vagina, and later hardens into a plug or glues the tract together. While females can expel the plugs afterwards, the male's sperm still gets a time advantage in getting to the egg, which is often the deciding factor in fertilization.

The mating plug plays an important role in sperm competition and may serve as an alternative and more advantageous strategy to active mate guarding. In some species, such a passive mate-guarding strategy may reduce selection on large male size. Such a strategy may be advantageous because it would allow a male to increase reproductive success by spending more time pursuing new female mates rather than active mate guarding.

== Composition ==
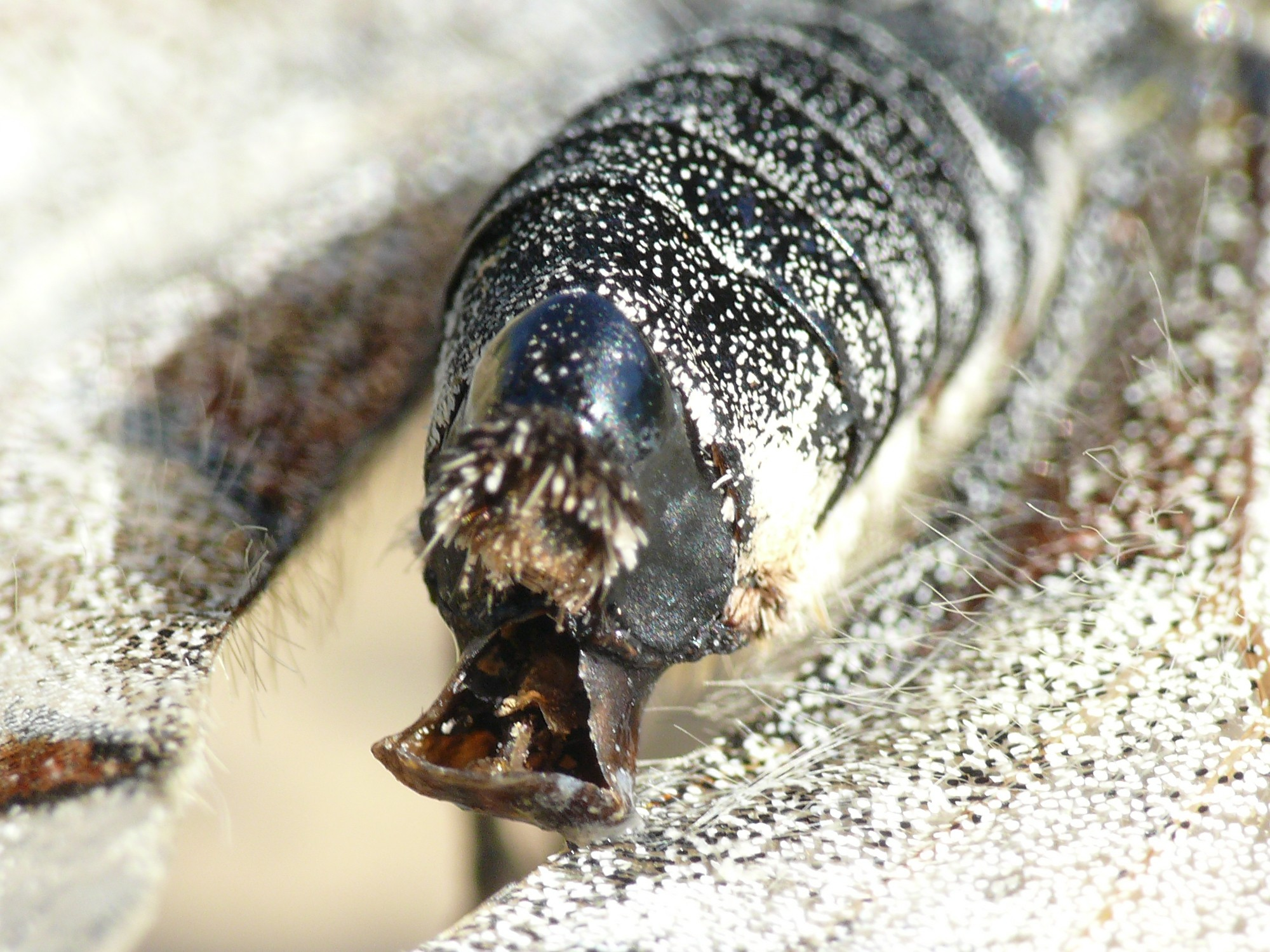
Sphragis on female Parnassius apollo butterfly

The mating plug of the Bombus terrestris was chemically analyzed and found to consist of palmitic acid, linoleic acid, oleic acid, stearic acid, and cycloprolylproline. It was found that the acids (without cycloprolylproline) were sufficient by themselves to create the plug. Researchers hypothesize that cycloprolylproline reduces female receptivity to further breeding.

== Occurrence in nature ==
Mating plugs are used by many species, including several primates, kangaroos, bees, reptiles, rodents, scorpions, bats, and spiders.

Use of a mating plug as a strategy for reproductive success can also be seen in a few taxa of Lepidoptera and other insects and is often associated with pupal mating. For example, to protect their paternity, male variable checkerspot butterflies pass a mating plug into the genital opening of females to prevent them from remating.

The Heliconius charithonia butterfly uses a mating plug in the form of a spermatophore that provides predatory defense chemicals and protein sources for developing eggs. It also acts as an anaphrodisiac that prevents other males from mating with the female. Similarly in Parnassius smintheus butterflies, the male deposits a waxy genital plug on the tip of the female's abdomen to prevent the female from mating again. It contains sperm and important nutrients for the female, and ensures that the male is the only one to fertilize the female's eggs.

Most species of stingless bees, like Plebeia remota, are only mated once, and thus make use of mating plugs to store all the sperm they collect for future use.

Another species of insect that uses a copulatory plug is Drosophila mettleri, a Sonoran Desert Fly species from the Diptera family. These plugs serve as a means of male-female control during mating interactions.

A peculiar example of mate plugging occurs in Leucauge mariana spiders. Both male and female participation is required to create a mate plug. The male alone cannot create a functional plug. Female participation in creating mating plugs, and her presumed benefit from them, have led to multiple studies of sexual selection on the sexual behavior of L. mariana.

In Thamnophis sirtalis parietalis, commonly known as red-sided garter snakes, males deposit a gelatinous copulatory plug to seal the female's cloacal opening to prevent re-mating and leakage of the deposited sperm, and alter female pheromonal cues that attract mates.

Some cetaceans have folds in the vagina that do not occur in other mammals. The function of these folds is unknown, but it is possible that they form vaginal plugs or retain sperm after copulation.

== See also ==
- Bulbus glandis
