= Blub =

Blub may refer to:

- Blub (water park), an abandoned water park in Berlin
- A hypothetical programming language imagined by programmer Paul Graham
- 5,6-dimethylbenzimidazole synthase, an enzyme

== See also ==
- Bulb (disambiguation)
