= G6B =

Protein-coding gene in the species Homo sapiens

MPIG6B

Identifiers
- Aliases: MPIG6B, G6b, NG31, C6orf25, G6B, chromosome 6 open reading frame 25, G6b-B, megakaryocyte and platelet inhibitory receptor G6b, THAMY
- External IDs: OMIM: 606520; MGI: 2146995; GeneCards: MPIG6B

Gene location (Human)
Chr.	Chromosome 6 (human)
Band	6p21.33	Start	31,718,594 bp
Band	6p21.33	End	31,726,714 bp

Gene location (Mouse)
Chr.	Chromosome 17 (mouse)
Band	17|17 B1	Start	35,281,669 bp
Band	17|17 B1	End	35,285,160 bp
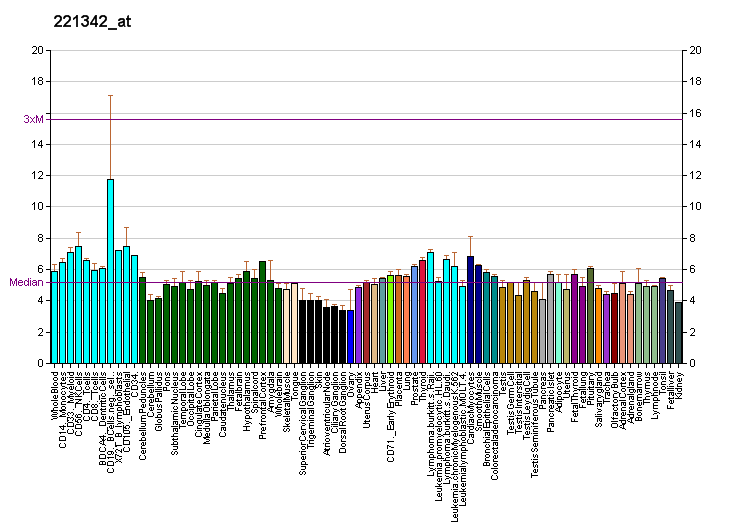
RNA expression pattern
Bgee	Human / Mouse (ortholog); Top expressed in: monocyte; blood; granulocyte; bone marrow cell; skin of leg; skin of abdomen; testicle; right lung; epithelium of colon; spleen / Top expressed in: bone marrow; spleen; embryo; blastocyst; lip; morula; ventricle of the heart; testicle; epiblast; zone of skin; More reference expression data
BioGPS	More reference expression data
Gene ontology
Molecular function	heparin binding; protein binding
Cellular component	integral component of membrane; plasma membrane; endoplasmic reticulum; membrane; Golgi apparatus
Biological process	platelet activation; negative regulation of signal transduction; integrin-mediated signaling pathway; blood coagulation; erythrocyte differentiation; megakaryocyte differentiation; platelet formation; megakaryocyte development
Sources:Amigo / QuickGO
Orthologs
Databases	NCBI: entry; OMA: entry
Species	Human	Mouse
Entrez	80739	106722
Ensembl	ENSG00000206396; ENSG00000224393; ENSG00000204420; ENSG00000237459; ENSG00000230060 ENSG00000228090; ENSG00000231003	ENSMUSG00000073414
UniProt	O95866	D7PDD4
RefSeq (mRNA)	NM_025260; NM_138272; NM_138273; NM_138274; NM_138275 NM_138276; NM_138277	NM_001033221; NM_001191012
RefSeq (protein)	NP_079536; NP_612116; NP_612117; NP_612118; NP_612119 NP_612121; NP_079536.2; NP_612116.1; NP_612117.1; NP_612118.1; NP_612119.1; NP_612121.1	NP_001028393; NP_001177941
Location (UCSC)	Chr 6: 31.72 – 31.73 Mb	Chr 17: 35.28 – 35.29 Mb
PubMed search
- Wikidata
View/Edit Human	View/Edit Mouse

Protein G6b is a protein that in humans is encoded by the MPIG6B gene (previously G6B).

This gene is a member of the immunoglobulin (Ig) superfamily and is located in the major histocompatibility complex (MHC) class III region, a region that contains many genes that have relevance to the immune system. The protein encoded by this gene is a glycosylated, plasma membrane-bound cell surface receptor, but soluble isoforms encoded by some transcript variants have been found in the endoplasmic reticulum and Golgi before being secreted. Multiple transcript variants encoding different isoforms have been found for this gene.

== Isoforms ==
Structurally distinct, but functionally similar versions of a protein that comes from the same gene or very closely related are known as a protein isoform or known as a "protein variant". Many function similarly or biologically similar, there are some isoform have unique functions.

G6b-B is one of two major membrane bound isoforms, which contains a extracellular N-terminal Ig-like domain and transmembrane segment. This isoform is containing of two immunoreceptors tyrosine-based inhibitory motifs (ITIMs) in the cytoplasmic tail that is not found in the G6b-A isoform. G6b-A isoform is different from G6b-B isoform by the cytoplasmic tail that is not found in G6b-A. G6b-B is binding the protein tyrosine phosphatases SHP-1 and SHP-2 when pervanadate-induced phosphorylation of the ITIMs happens. What allows for the interaction between G6b with SHP-1 and SHP-2 is the phosphorylation of tyrosine 211 that can be seen on the cytoplasmic tail.

G6b-B contains the two tyrosine residues in the cytoplasmic tail (Tyr-211 and Tyr-237) that with the site directed mutagenesis, shows the suggestion that only Tyr-211 gets phosphorylated in when pervanadate stimulation of COS-7 cells happens. This Tyr-211 is responsible for SHP-1 and SHP-2 binding. Phosphorylation of Tyr-237 from the G5b-B cytoplasmic tail is not detectable, as there is a possibility that the phosphorylation of Tyr-237 is dependent on prior phosphorylation of the Tyr-211.

== Function ==
The function of G6b is for it to be a cell-surface receptor that has inhibitory function that operates in a calcium-independent way. With this G6b has been seen to have a novel inhibitory receptor as well that is found on the surface of platelets. G6b's function has a crucial connection to the identification of the extracellular ligand, as the protein ligands for the Ig superfamily members are typically, but not every time, other Ig superfamily members. Interactions between the Ig superfamily members and the ligands connected to them, typically have a low affinity, which makes the identifications of ligands in experiments challenging. At the moment the G6b Ig domain is shown to not contain any significant homology towards any other Ig domain that contain proteins with a known ligand. The extracellular domain of the G6b protein shows that there is evidence that the binding to heparin is mainly electrostatic. However, the protein ligand of the extracellular part of the G6b has not been identified yet, there is a possibility that the binding of heparin plays an essential role in the G6b biological function.

The inhibitory function that is seen is expressed on the surface of the resting platelets with cross-linking G6b which, leads to the inhibitory effect on the platelet aggregation and activation. The platelet aggregation studied with the cross-linking of G6b to determine if signaling through G6b had an effect on the platelet function. Cross-linking of the G6b before the activation of the platelets with the agonist ADP which led to a significant dose-dependent reduction in the platelet aggregation, leading to the end point aggregation reduced from 100% to 25%. As well the cross-linking of G6b before the activation of CRP-XL that led to a two-fold reduction in the platelet aggregation.

== Expression ==
The expression of G6b-A and G6b-B has been shown to be expressed on the surface of resting RNA and mRNA platelets. G6b-B is the only G6b isoform when analyzed to appear to be efficiently phosphorylated when COS-7 cells and K562 cells are expressing recombinant protein that are treated with pervanadate. The proteins are transiently expressed in the COS-7 cells with the use of DEAE-dextran method. Three days following the transfection, cells, and the supernatants are harvested. Then the K562 cells are transfected with the Lipofectin, and the cells are maintained in the presence of 0.5 mg/ml G418.

The expressions seen in COS-7 cells from the G6b isoforms come from the transmembrane segments of G6b-A and G6b-B as well as the soluble G6b-D and G6b-E. The G6b-A and G6b-D are identical from their C-terminus, the opposite of the N-terminus and the end of the amino acid chain. The corresponding C-terminus G6b isoforms are G6b-A and G6b-E. G6b-A, G6b-B, G6b-D, and G6b-E were cloned into the pcDNA3, in combination with T7 epitope as a fusion which leads to fusion proteins. The new fusion proteins in the COS-7 cells are transiently expressed. Through the observation of the SDS-polyacrylamide gel, there was multiple bands per the lane that could be representative of glycosylation. From this each band can be representing of the glycosylation in different states in the protein. The only isoforms that were present in the medium were G6b-D and G6b-E, as they didn't contain a transmembrane segment within them. The molecular sizes that were observed from the proteins are considered acceptable with the expected molecular sizes for each case of the lowest band found in the case. The only exception was the G6b-E that was found within the medium. Large glycan chains having a presence can be the cause of this exception.

== Glycosidase treatment ==
Investigations of G6b variants are conducted to see if the different G6b variants had gotten glycosylated, which was done through the incubation of COS-7 cell lysates, the cell supernatants that contained the C-terminal forms of G6b in combination with glycosidases N-glycosidase F, O-glycosidase, and at times neuraminidase. All variants with the exception of G6b-E with the treatment of N-glycosidase F leads to disappearance of select bands, which leads to indication of N-glycan chains. Neuraminidase and O-glycosidase treatments together leads to a result of bands with molecular weight having no difference to bands that were received after only neuraminidase treatments, with the exception being the G6b-E. This indicates that substantial O-glycosylation in the form. When G6b-A and G6b-B are treated with N-glycosidase F and are then compared to the proteins that are treated with all three glycosidase, a minor difference in molecular weight can be observed. This minor difference is through the presence of low molecular weight of the O-glycan chains. G6b-D and G6b-E that are secreted into the medium are going to contain more glycosylation that what is found in the related cell lysates. Proteins that are discovered within the cell lysates, can also represent the misfolded proteins. This is the cause that these may not be transported through their secretory pathway and lead to a not complete glycosylation.
