= C10H14N2O2 =

The molecular formula C_{10}H_{14}N_{2}O_{2} may refer to:

- Solriamfetol
- NNZ-2591
- 4-Nitromethamphetamine
- Cycloprolylproline
