= Bulbus =

Bulbus may refer to:

== Anatomy ==
A bulb-shaped anatomical structure, including:

- bulbus, an archaic term for the medulla oblongata, as used for example in the term corticobulbar tract
- Bulbus arteriosus
- Bulbus cordis
- Bulbus duodeni
- Bulbus glandis
- Bulbus oculi
- Bulbus olfactorius
- Bulbus penis
- Bulbus pili
- Bulbus urethrae
- Bulbus vestibuli vaginae

== Other ==
- Bulbus (gastropod), a genus of predatory sea snails
- Bulbus fritillariae cirrhosae, from Fritillaria plants
