= Canine reproduction =

Sexual reproduction in canine species

Canine reproduction is the process of sexual reproduction in domestic dogs, wolves, coyotes and other canine species.

== Canine sexual anatomy and development ==
=== Male reproductive system ===
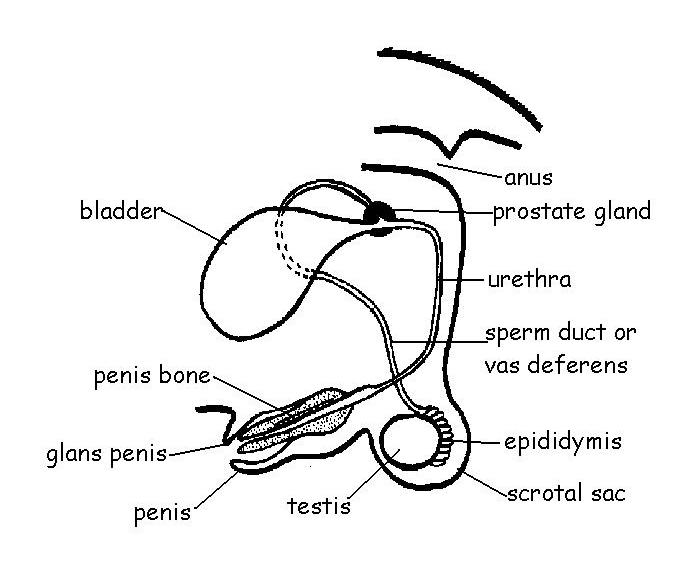
Canine male reproductive system

==== Erectile tissue ====
As with all mammals, a dog's penis is made up of three pieces of erectile tissue. These are the two corpora cavernosa and the singular corpus spongiosum which continues in the glans. A notable difference from the human penis is that the visible part during an erection consists entirely of the glans.

The retractor muscle is attached at the shaft of the penis. It is a paired smooth muscle that is used to retract the penis back into the sheath.

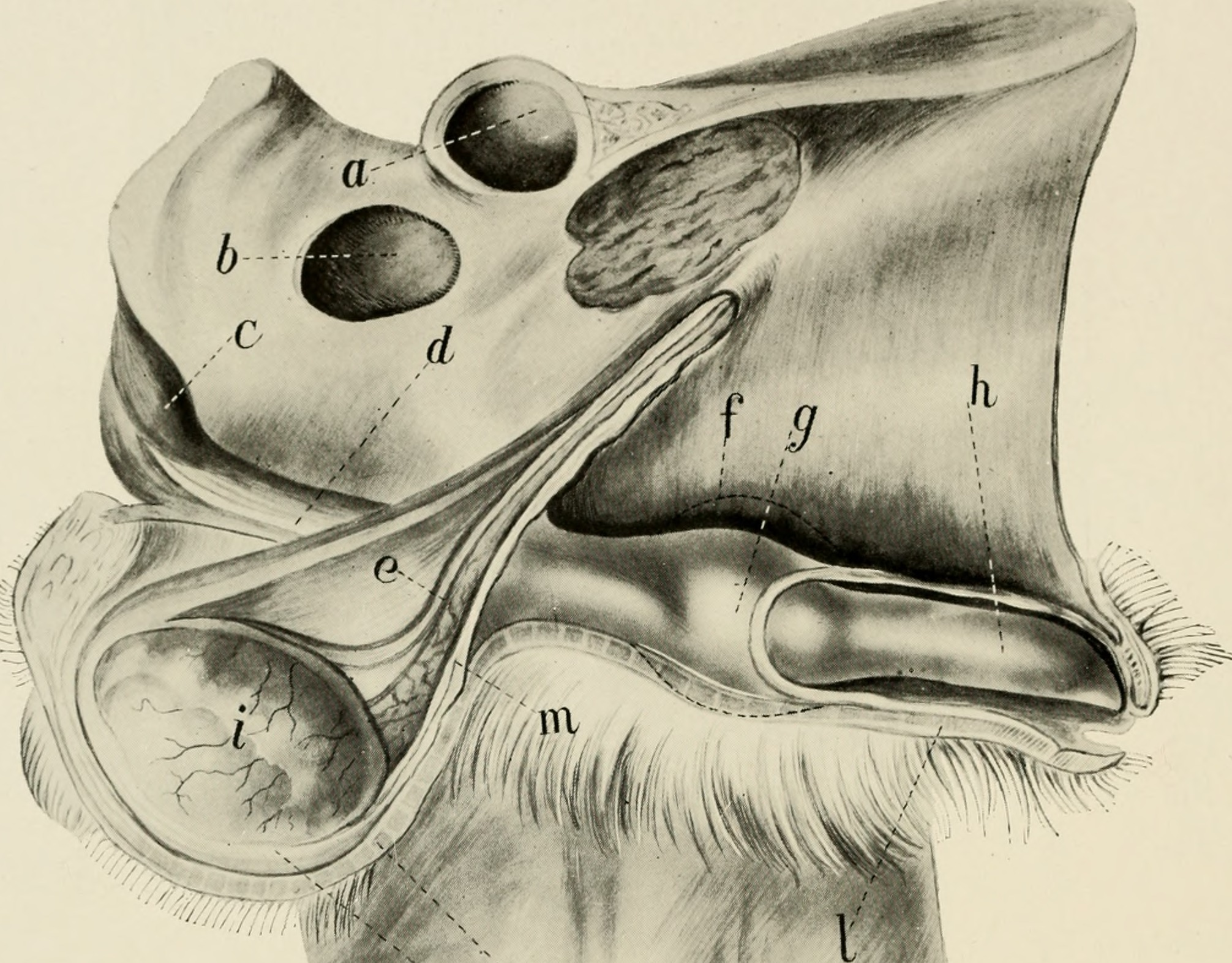

==== Glans ====
A dog's glans consists of two sections: Behind the lower, long part (pars longa glandis) lies the "knot" (Bulbus glandis) which expands only after penetrating the vagina and causes the male dog to remain inside the female ("tie") for some time after ejaculation (typically between 5 and 20 minutes). This increases the chance of fertilisation and prevents, albeit for a short time, other suitors from mating with a particular female.

Behind the knot the penis is very flexible in the horizontal direction allowing the male to unmount while remaining tied.

==== Shaft ====
The shaft of a dog's penis is not visible, even during an erection; however its pathway can be felt starting at the knot passing between the hind legs and carrying on up to the anus.

==== Baculum and urethra ====
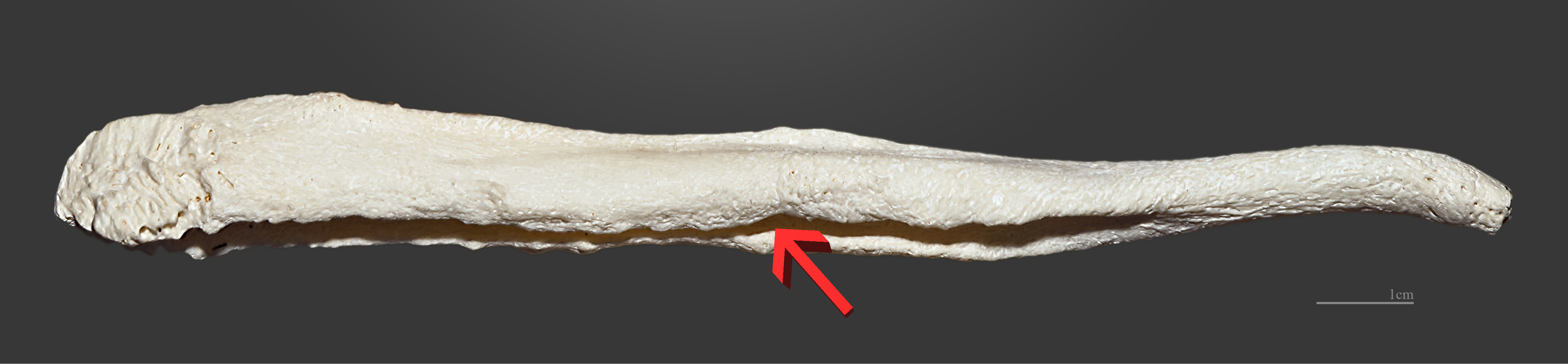
Baculum of a domestic dog; The arrow points to the bottom groove where the urethra is located. The tip is to the right.

Inside the corpus spongiosum lies the baculum. This allows the male dog to enter into the vagina before the erectile tissue is swollen. The urethra is located inside of a downward facing groove on the baculum and ends at the tip of the penis (urethral process).

During an erection a small dip just above the urethral process can be seen. This is because the skin at the tip of the penis is connected via cartilage to the baculum. When the erectile tissue swells, the size of the baculum and connective tissue remains constant, pulling back the skin at the tip.

==== Sheath ====
The penile sheath entirely surrounds the glans while not erect. The back part is intergrown with the abdominal skin. The front part, almost reaching to the navel, is free. The inner sheath, just like the glans, is covered with a mucous membrane and the outer sheath is covered with normal, hairy epidermis.

=== Development ===
In domestic dogs, sexual maturity (puberty) occurs between the ages of 6 and 12 months for both males and females, although this can be delayed until up to two years of age for some large breeds. Pregnancy is possible as soon as the first estrus cycle, but breeding is not recommended prior to the second cycle. As with other domesticated species, domestication has selectively bred for higher libido, and earlier and more frequent breeding cycles in dogs than in their ancestors.

== The female reproductive cycle ==
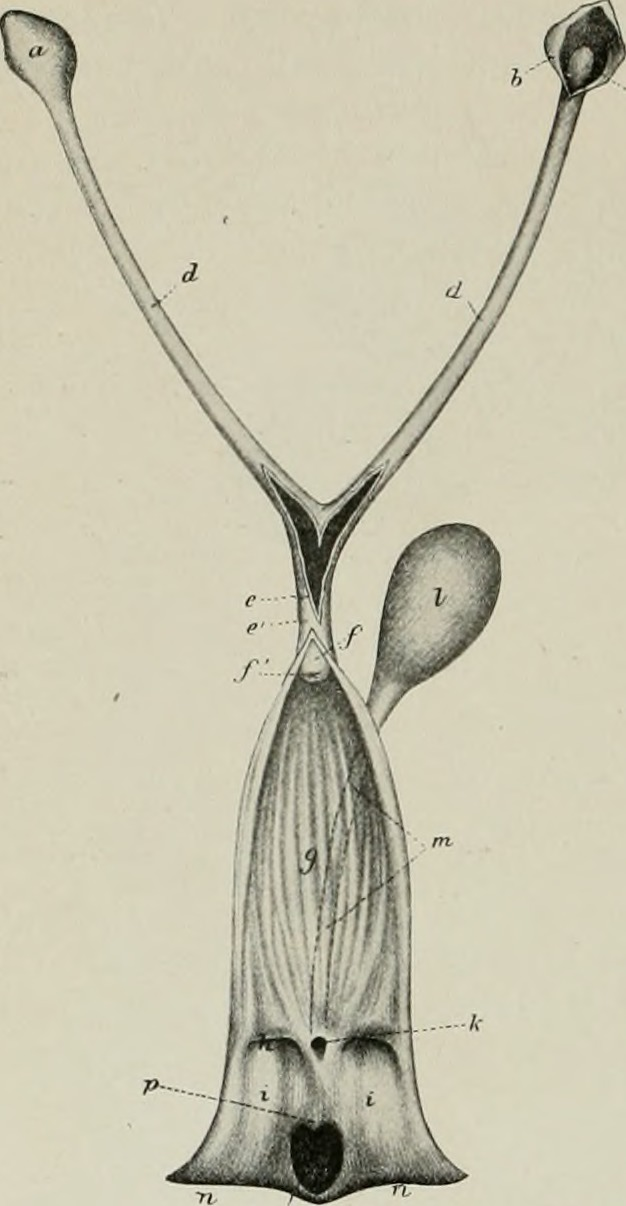
Canine female reproductive tract

=== Female cycle ===
The average length of the reproductive cycle for females is 4–48 days. Every breed has their own cycle built into their genetics, making their time in heat unique to their own breed, therefore making crossbreeds open to new cycle lengths; 4–48 days in heat is confirmed to be the most accurately recorded range of times and proven to be the limits for the lengths of time for females to be in heat. Females reach sexual maturity (puberty) as young as three months of age and rarely longer than nine months for larger breeds. There is a tremendous variability in the maturation age between breeds, and even within a breed of dog.

1. Proestrus, in which eggs in the ovaries begin to mature and estrogen levels begin to rise, is the first stage of the reproductive cycle. During this stage females, though non-receptive, attract males. Initial changes include swelling of the vulva lips, which become pliable, small amounts of bloody vaginal discharge, frequent urination, and signs of restlessness. Proestrus generally lasts nine days.

2. Estrus follows, in which estrogen levels are high, mature eggs are released from both ovaries, and females become receptive both physically and mentally to copulation. Only during estrus will copulation result in pregnancy.

During proestrus and estrus, females may have a clear, blood tinged, or bloody discharge. Dogs during these stages are often informally referred to as being in heat. The length of these cycles varies greatly among breeds and even between individuals of the same breed. Proestrus and estrus can last anywhere from five to 21 days.

3. Diestrus is the period following mating. Diestrus lasts approximately 56 to 60 days in a pregnant female, and 60 to 100 days in a non-pregnant female. During both of these periods, progesterone levels are high. Because the hormonal profile of a pregnant female and a female in diestrus are the same, sometimes a non-pregnant female will go through a period of pseudopregnancy. At that time she may gain weight, have mammary gland development, produce milk, and exhibit nesting behaviours.

4. Anestrus is the remaining period, the time of reproductive quiescence. The female has no attraction to mating. Anestrus generally lasts four to five months.

== Copulation ==
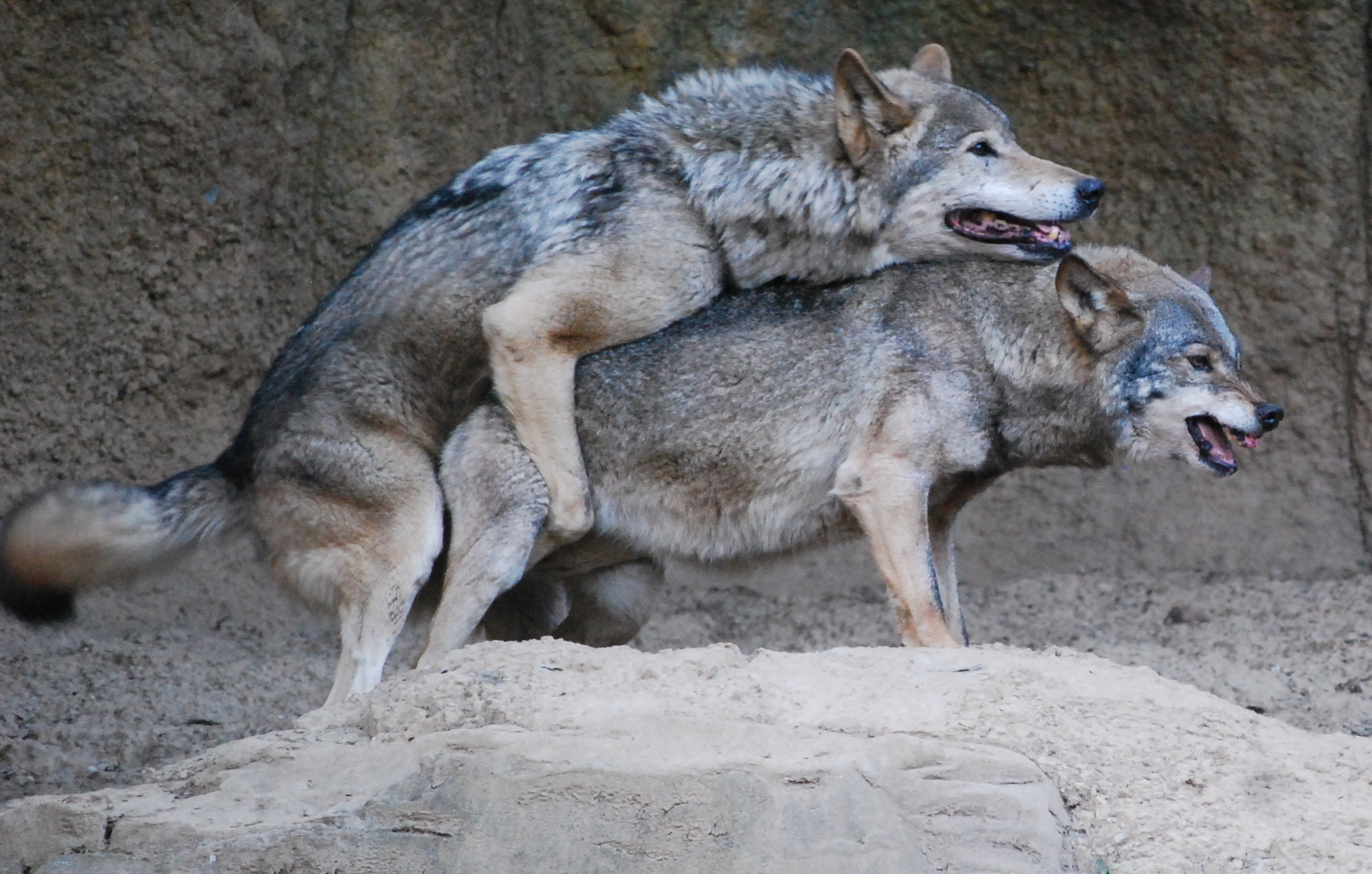
Wolves mating, Tama zoo

As with most tetrapods, canine copulation involves the male mounting the female from behind, a position that is colloquially referred to in humans as "doggy style" but does not have a specifically known origin. When a male canine is interested in mounting a female, he will sniff the female's vulva, which, for females in the estrus stage, has been secreted with Methyl p-hydroxybenzoate. If the female is unreceptive, she may sit, lie down, snap, retreat, or otherwise be uncooperative. If the female is receptive, she will stand still and hold her tail to the side, a stance referred to as flagging. The male will often continue examining the female's rear, before mounting her from behind while attempting penetration with his penis.

Unlike human sexual intercourse, where the male penis commonly becomes erect before entering the female, canine copulation involves the male first penetrating the female, after which swelling of the penis to erection occurs, which usually happens rapidly. At the time of penetration, the canine penis is not erect and is only able to penetrate the female because it includes a narrow bone called the baculum, a feature of most placental mammals. When the male achieves penetration, he will usually hold the female tighter and thrust deeply. It is during this time that the male's penis expands; it is important that the bulbus glandis is sufficiently far inside for the female to be able to trap it.

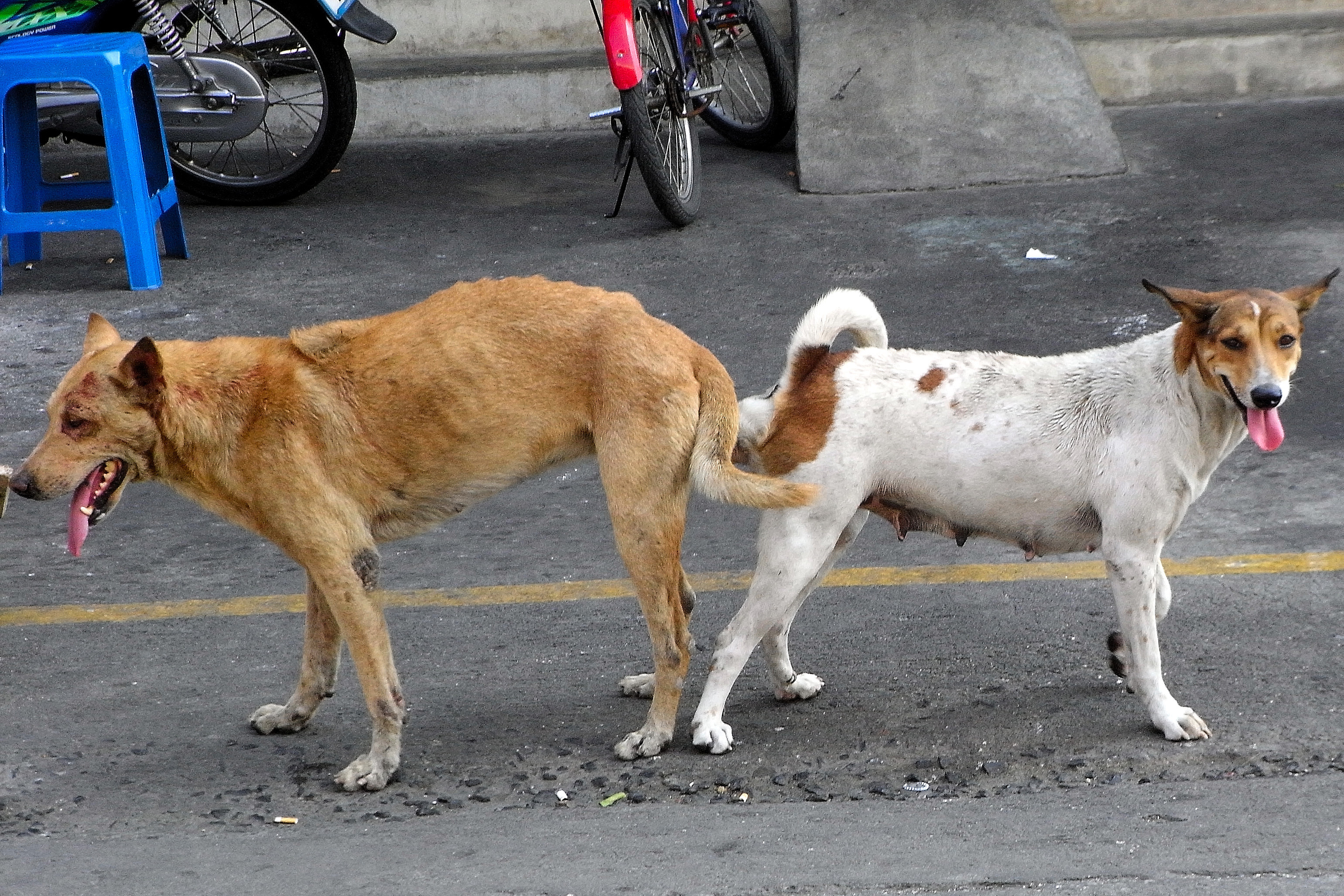
Knotting

Male canines are the only animals that have a locking bulbus glandis, commonly known as bulb or knot, a spherical area of erectile tissue at the base of the penis. During copulation, and only after the male's penis is fully inside the female's vagina, the bulbus glandis becomes engorged with blood. When the female's vagina subsequently contracts, the penis becomes locked inside the female. This is known as tying or knotting. While characteristic of mating in most canids, the copulatory tie has been reported to be absent or very brief (less than one minute) in the African wild dog, possibly due to the abundance of large predators in its environment.

When the penis is locked into the vagina by the bulbus glandis (when the stud is knotted), thrusting behavior stops and the male will usually lift a leg and swing it over the female's back while turning around. The two stand with their hind ends touching and the penis locked inside the vagina while ejaculation occurs, decreasing leakage of semen from the vagina. After some time, typically between 5 and 20 minutes (but sometimes longer), the bulbus glandis disengorges, allowing the mates to separate. Virgin dogs can become quite distressed at finding themselves unable to separate during their first copulation and may try to pull away or run. Dog breeders often suggest it is appropriate for handlers to attempt to calm the mating dogs if they show anxiety once this stage is reached. After mating, the male usually licks his penis and prepuce.

== Gestation and litters ==
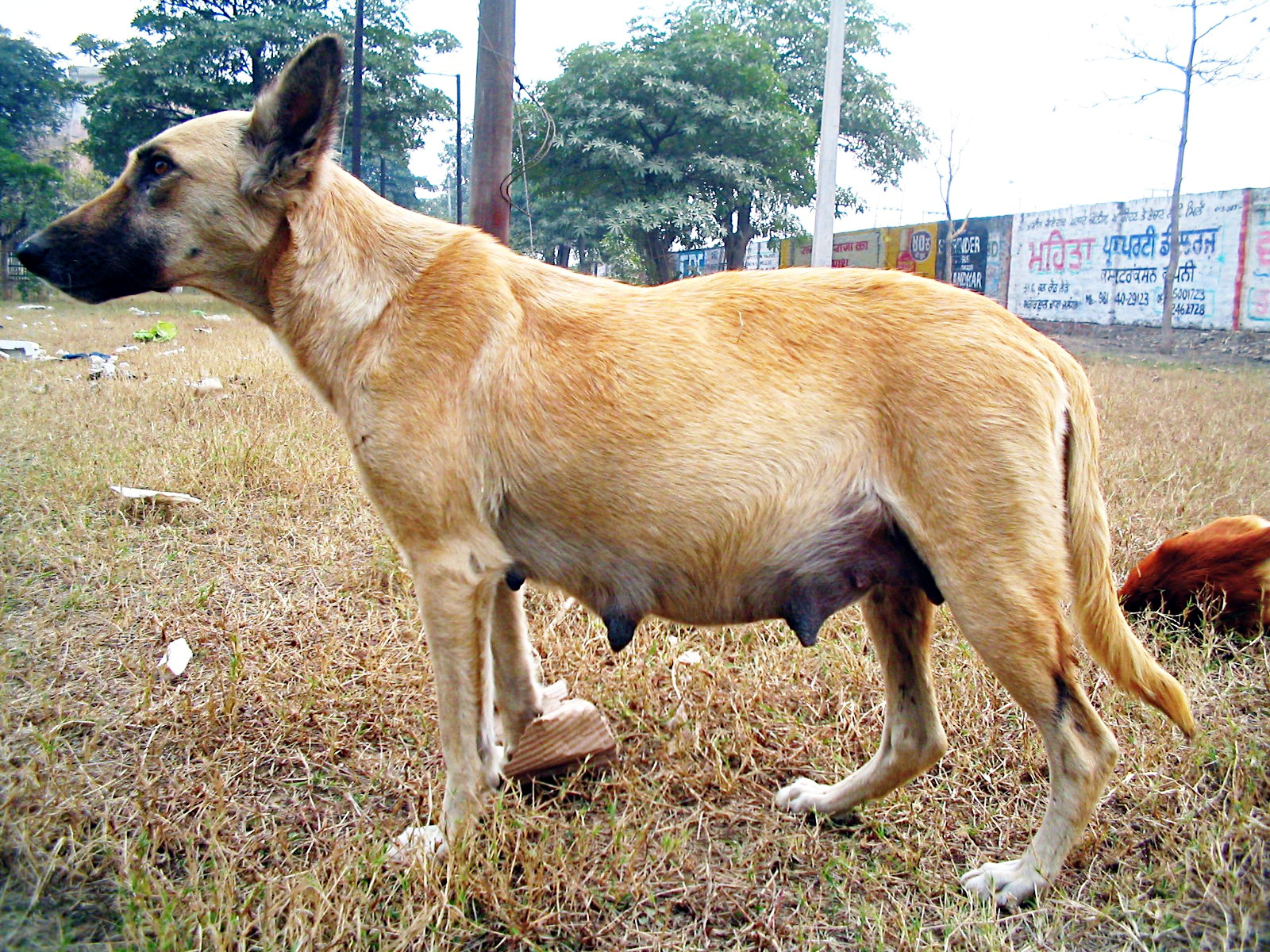
A pregnant mongrel

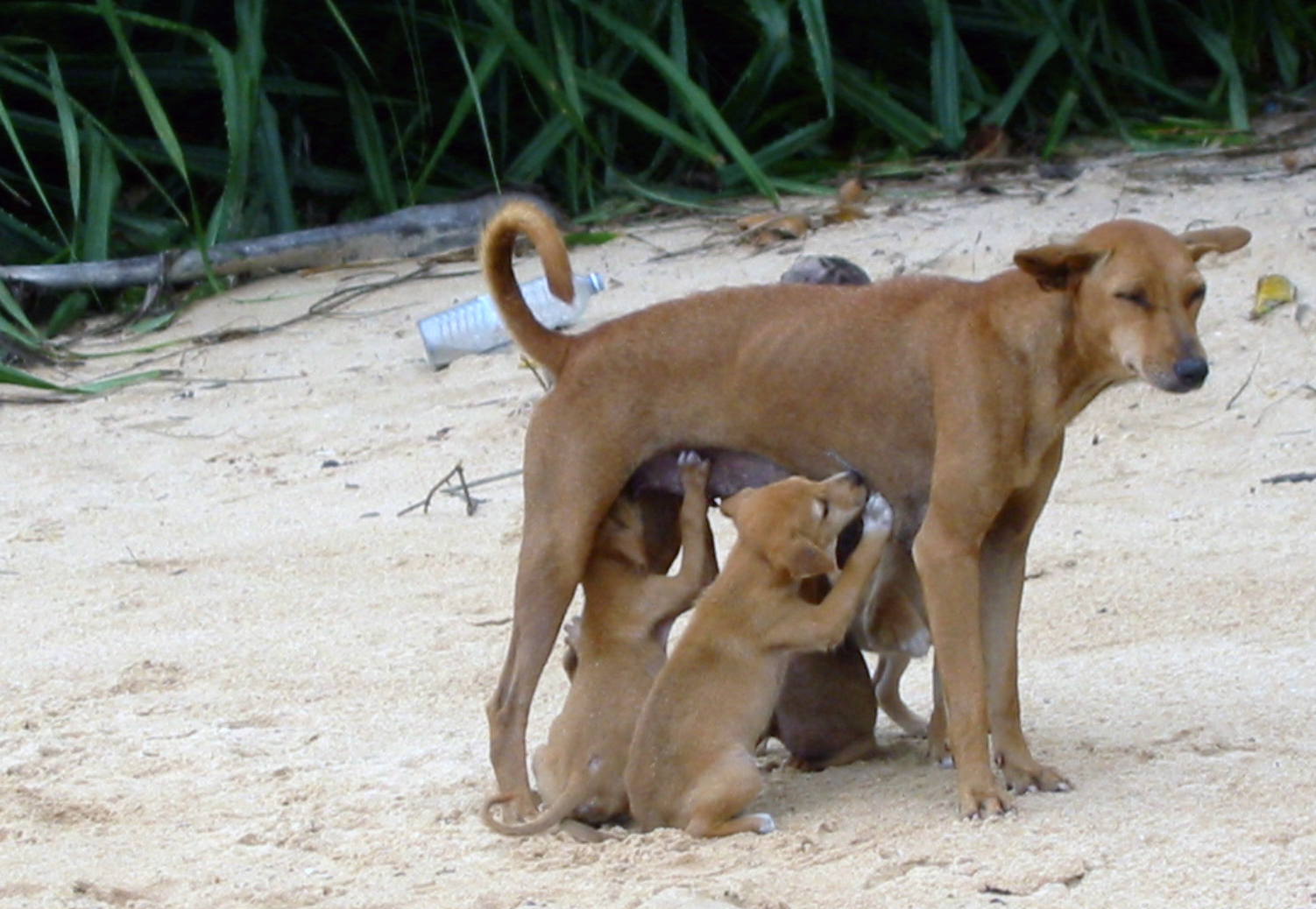
A feral dog from Sri Lanka nursing her puppies

Gestation in a dog is 63 days in length, if measured from the day of ovulation. Since it is difficult to determine the exact date of ovulation, errors are often made in calculating gestation period. Canine sperm can live for 10 to 11 days in the oviducts (fallopian tubes), so if a female is bred 10 days before the oocytes (eggs) can be fertilized, she will appear to have a gestation length of 70 days. If she is bred on the day the oocytes can be fertilized, her gestation length will appear to be 60 days long.

During gestation, many physiological changes are similar to those of other mammals, like humans. This results in similar shifts in nutrients in the blood of dogs, especially levels of glucose, fatty acids (like DHA) and amino acids (like BCAA).

A rule of thumb is that a mammal will produce half as many offspring as the number of teats on the mother. This rule is altered in domesticated animals since larger litters are often favoured for economic reasons and in dogs, particularly, the great range of sizes and shapes plays a role in how many healthy puppies a female can carry. A female dog usually has 10 teats, though this does not mean she can necessarily provide sufficient nutrition for 10 puppies in one litter.

An average litter consists of about five to six puppies, though this number varies widely based on the breed of dog. Size of the breed is correlated with litter size. Miniature and small breeds average three to four puppies in each litter, with a maximum litter size of about 5–8. Large and giant breeds average 7 puppies per litter but can have a maximum litter size of about 15. In one study, the Rhodesian Ridgeback had the highest average litter size, with 8.9 pups per litter, while the Pomeranian and Toy Poodle had the lowest, with 2.4 pups per litter.

The number of puppies also varies with the mother's age. In smaller breeds, both young and old age are associated with smaller litter size. In larger breeds, only old age is associated with smaller litter size. Use of artificial insemination is also associated with smaller litter size, with frozen semen having a stronger effect than fresh semen.

The largest recorded litter size to date was a Neapolitan Mastiff in Manea, England, on November 29, 2004; the litter was 24 puppies.

Some breeds have been developed to emphasize certain physical traits beyond the point at which they can safely bear litters on their own.

A large-scale study in Norway showed that, across all breeds, about 4% of pups will be stillborn and a further 4% will die within the first week (early neonatal mortality). Between 8 days and 8 weeks, 1% will die. Litter size, breed size and age of the female are associated with increased risk. Breeds at high risk of stillborns are the Dogue de Bordeaux (14.2%), St. Bernard (12.3%), Chow Chow (12.1%), Pembroke Welsh Corgis (11.7%) and Dalmatian (10.6%). In a study The Basenji, Italian Greyhound, Australian Terrier, Irish Soft Coated Wheaten Terrier and Bichon Havanais had few to no stillborns (0–0.6%). Breeds at high risk of early neonatal mortality include the Rhodesian Ridgeback (11.6%), Dogue de Bordeaux (10.4% ), Dalmatians (8.8%) and Icelandic Sheepdog (8.7%), while the Basenji and Tibetan Terrier had no early neonatal mortality and the Border Terrier and Danish-Swedish Farmdog had <1% early neonatal mortality.

Common causes of early neonatal mortality are bacterial infection, fetal asphyxia and fading puppy syndrome. Other causes may include elective euthanasia because of congenital defects or failure to meet breed standards.

Other multi-breed studies have put stillborn rates at 6.5–7% and early neonatal mortality at 11.5–19.8%.

=== Inbreeding depression ===
On the basis of an analysis of data on 42,855 Dachshund litters, it was found that as the inbreeding coefficient increased litter size decreased and the percentage of stillborn puppies increased, thus indicating inbreeding depression. Inbreeding depression is a reduction in progeny fitness due largely to the homozygous expression of deleterious recessive mutations.

The gray wolves (Canis lupus) of Isle Royale National Park, Michigan, US, were a small highly inbred population that was considered to be at the threshold of extinction in 2019. This wolf population had been experiencing severe inbreeding depression largely due to the homozygous expression of strongly deleterious recessive mutations. Another highly inbred Scandinavian population of wolves (Canis lupus) also suffered from inbreeding depression that was again attributed to the homozygous expression of deleterious recessive mutations.

=== Inbreeding avoidance ===
Because the African wild dog (Lycaon pictus) largely exists in fragmented small populations, its existence is endangered. Inbreeding avoidance via mate selection is characteristic of the species and has important potential consequences for population persistence. Inbreeding is rare within natal packs. Computer population simulations indicate that all populations continuing to avoid incestuous mating will become extinct within 100 years due to the unavailability of unrelated mates. Thus the impact of reduced numbers of suitable unrelated mates will likely have a severe demographic impact on the future viability of small wild dog populations.

Red wolves primarily live in packs composed of a socially monogamous breeding pair and offspring of different ages. Using long-term data on red wolf individuals of known pedigree, it was found that inbreeding among first-degree relatives was rare. A likely mechanism for avoidance of inbreeding is independent dispersal trajectories from the natal pack. Many of the young wolves spend time alone or in small non-breeding packs composed of unrelated individuals. The union of two unrelated individuals in a new home range is the predominant pattern of breeding pair formation.

Among Ethiopian wolves, most females disperse from their natal pack at about two years of age, and some become "floaters" that may successfully immigrate into existing packs. Breeding pairs are most often unrelated to each other, suggesting that female-biased dispersal reduces inbreeding.

Grey wolves and Arctic foxes also exhibit inbreeding avoidance.

It is evolutionarily advantageous to avoid inbreeding because it leads to a reduction in progeny fitness (inbreeding depression) due largely to the homozygous expression of deleterious recessive alleles. Cross-fertilization between unrelated individuals ordinarily leads to the masking of deleterious recessive alleles in progeny.

== Clinical issues ==
Female dogs are at risk for endometritis and pyometra in the postpartum period and after estrus or vaginitis. Signs and symptoms include fever, lethargy, loss of appetite, excessive thirst, restlessness, a foul smelling vaginal discharge which may or may not be bloody, infertility, or they may be asymptomatic. Uterine infections should be treated expeditiously if suspected. Contrary to common belief, uterine infections can strike any intact female, whether she has been bred or not, and whether it is her first season or not although it is more common as dogs become older.

== Dog breeding ==
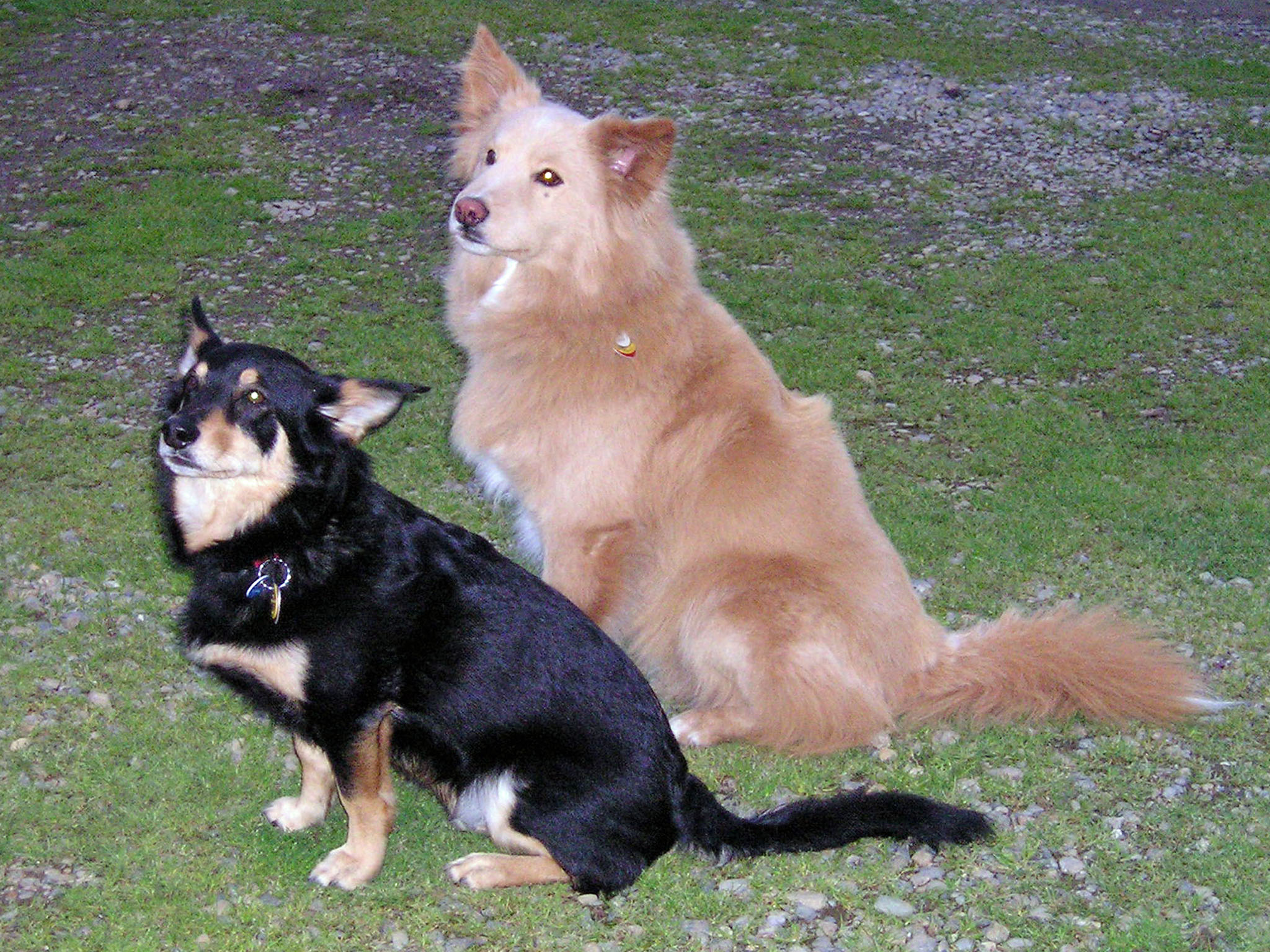
These littermates were born to an Australian Shepherd mother.

=== Semen collection ===
An artificial vagina is prepared, which is a conical thin latex sleeve ending in a sterile collection tube. The inside of the latex sleeve is lightly lubricated. The male is allowed to sniff a female in estrus. Experienced studs cooperate readily in the process. New studs often require encouragement in the form of manual stimulation. Generally the male will mount the female, and the collector quickly directs the male's penis into the latex sleeve. The male ejaculates and the semen is collected in the tube. The semen is then drawn up into a long thin pipette.

== Cross breeding ==
Designer breed dogs are mixed-breed dogs intentionally bred from parents of two established breeds. Studies have shown that cross-bred dogs have a number of desirable reproductive traits. Scott and Fuller found that cross-bred females were superior mothers compared to purebred females, producing more milk and giving better care. These advantages led to decreased mortality in the offspring; however, the qualities of such dogs are not predictable. For example, Labrador x Poodle ("Labradoodle") can inherit the coat of either a Labrador, a poodle, or a remix.

== Spaying and neutering ==
Spaying (females) and neutering (males) refers to the sterilization of animals—usually by castration (removal of the male's testicles) or ovariohysterectomy (removal of the female's ovaries and uterus)—to eliminate the ability to procreate, and reduce sex drive. Castration has also been known to reduce aggression in male dogs (in some cases), but spaying has been shown to occasionally increase aggression in female dogs.

Animal control agencies in the United States and the ASPCA advise that dogs not intended for further breeding should be spayed or neutered so that they do not have undesired puppies. Spaying and castrating can decrease the risk of hormone-driven diseases such as mammary cancer, as well as undesired hormone-driven behaviors. However, certain medical problems are more likely after neutering, such as urinary incontinence in females and prostate cancer in males.

Dogs shown in the conformation ring are not allowed to be either neutered or spayed. It disqualifies them from being shown as they must be intact and unaltered.

Female cats and dogs are seven times more likely to develop mammary tumors if they are not spayed before their first heat cycle.

Studies have shown that spaying or neutering may be associated with increasing some serious health and behavioural consequences while reducing others. The American Veterinary Association (AVMA) position provides no single recommendation to spay or neuter nor for one single age for spay or neuter that is more or less optimal than another. Rather, the AVMA position is that spay or neuter be determined on a case-by-case basis to assess risks for orthopedic disease, neoplasia, reproductive disease, longevity, and population control for each individual.

Altered females:

Increased aggression can be shown in altered females if they have previously displayed aggression prior to surgical alteration. In a study by O'Farrell and Peachy, female dogs less than 11 months of age that had previously shown signs of aggression are more likely to have an increase in aggression after being spayed. These increases in aggression may be due to the sudden change in hormone concentrations that are the result of alteration. While spaying female dogs does not "induce" aggression, it can increase aggression and facilitate indiscriminate appetite in young altered females and can include them rapidly eating meals or eating food-associated items such as trash.

Altered males:

In nearly 2/3 of the cases that involve inter-dog aggression, castration can help decrease aggression. Castration also decreases other male-typical behavioral traits such as mounting, roaming, and urine marking. But a few studies have shown that male behavioral issues of mounting, roaming and urine marking still exist in altered males. Some people have reported after altering their male dogs that behavior such as roaming, mounting and urine marking has not changed the behavior. Aggression may increase, as the decrease in testosterone may lead to emotional issues and become more likely to react aggressively when feeling under threat. Male puppies that are neutered between 7 and 10 weeks are three times less likely to display behavioral problems, compared to canines neutered at 6 months or older. Most dominantly aggressive dogs are male, which causes many people to neuter their male canine companions. Removing testosterone can decrease the intensity of a canine's reaction to stimulus. Testosterone does not cause a behavior to occur, but its absence may decrease the occurrence of a "bad" behavior.

== See also ==
- Animal husbandry
- Canine reproductive behavior
- Canine transmissible venereal tumor
- Puppy mill
- Sexual behavior of coyotes
- Sexual behavior of golden jackals
- Sexual behavior of red foxes
