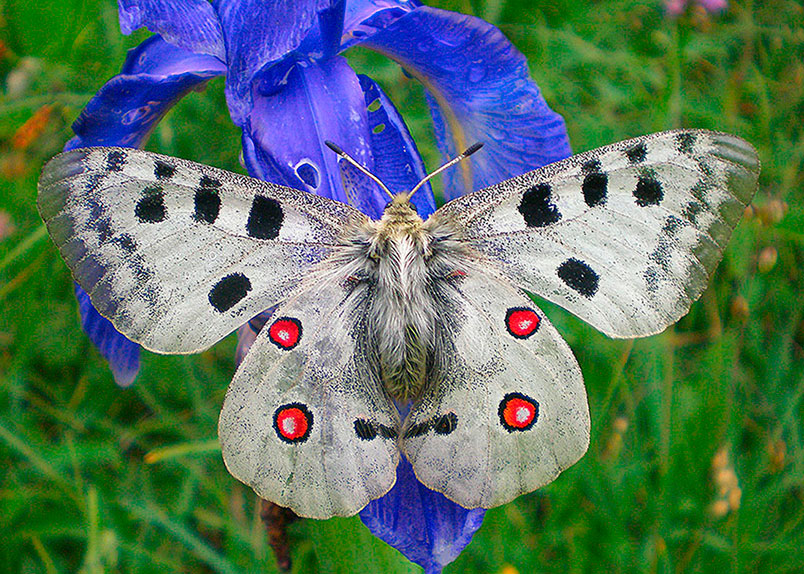
- Parnassius apollo. Upperside
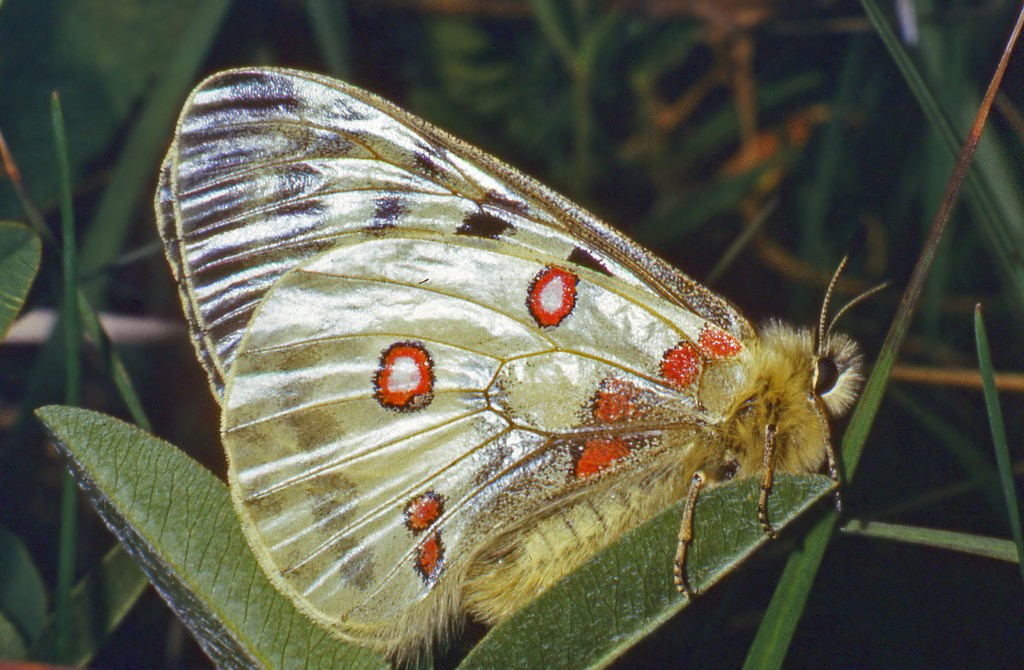
- Underside

Conservation status
- Least Concern (IUCN 3.1)
- CITES Appendix II

Scientific classification
- Kingdom: Animalia
- Phylum: Arthropoda
- Clade: Pancrustacea
- Class: Insecta
- Order: Lepidoptera
- Family: Papilionidae
- Genus: Parnassius
- Species: P. apollo

Binomial name
- Parnassius apollo (Linnaeus, 1758)
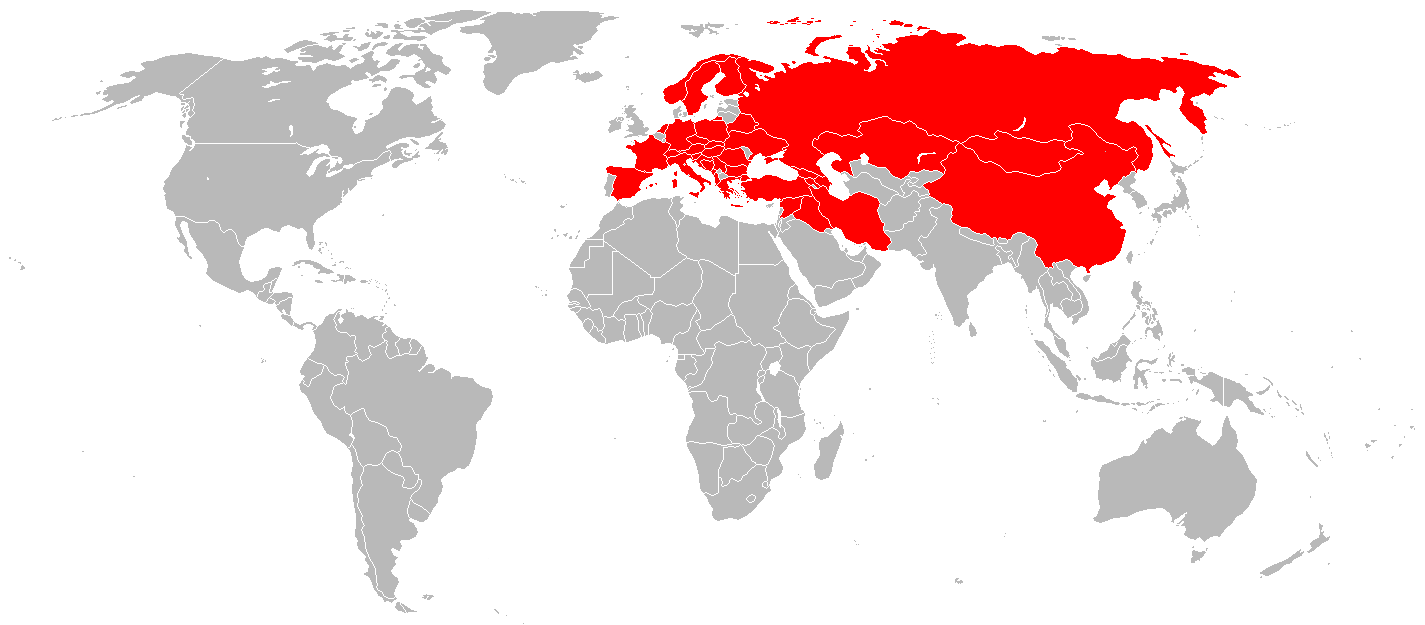
- Distribution map

= Apollo (butterfly) =

Species of butterfly

The Apollo (Parnassius apollo), also called the mountain Apollo, is a butterfly of the family Papilionidae.

== Etymology ==
The species is named in the classical tradition for the deity Apollo.

== Subspecies ==
Subspecies include:

- Parnassius apollo apollo L.
- Parnassius apollo alpherakyi Krulikowsky, 1906
- Parnassius apollo bartholomaeus Stichel, 1899
- Parnassius apollo democratus Kulikowsky, 1906
- Parnassius apollo filabricus Sagarra, 1933
- Parnassius apollo gadorensis Rougeot & Capdeville, 1969 (Sierra de Gádor). Extinct.
- Parnassius apollo geminus Schawerda, 1907
- Parnassius apollo graecus Ziegler, 1901
- Parnassius apollo hesebolus Nordmann, 1851
- Parnassius apollo hispanicus Oberthür, 1909 Central (Spain)
- Parnassius apollo limicola Stichel, 1906
- Parnassius apollo merzbacheri Fruhstorfer, 1906
- Parnassius apollo nevadensis Oberthür, 1891 (Sierra Nevada)
- Parnassius apollo provincialis Kheil, 1905
- Parnassius apollo pyrenaica Harcourt-Bath, 1896
- Parnassius apollo rhodopensis Markowitsch, 1910 (Greece, Balkans)
- Parnassius apollo rhaeticus Fruhstorfer, 1906
- Parnassius apollo rhea (Poda, 1761)
- Parnassius apollo rubidus Fruhstorfer, 1906
- Parnassius apollo sibiricus Nordmann, 1851
- Parnassius apollo sicilae Oberthür, 1891
- Parnassius apollo valesiacus Fruhstorfer, 1906
- Parnassius apollo vinningensis Stichel, 1899 (Moselle, Duitsland)

For a more complete list of subspecies and type details of specimens in the British Museum (Natural History) see Ackery, P. R. (1973) A list of the type-specimens of Parnassius (Lepidoptera: Papilionidae) in the British Museum (Natural History). Bulletin of the British Museum (Natural History) Entomology 29 (1) (9.XI.1973): 1—35, 1 pl. online here

== Distribution and habitat ==
This mountain butterfly species prefers hills and flowery alpine meadows, and pastures of the continental European mountains, in Spain, Scandinavia and Central Europe, in the Balkans up to northern Greece, and in the Alps between Italy and France.

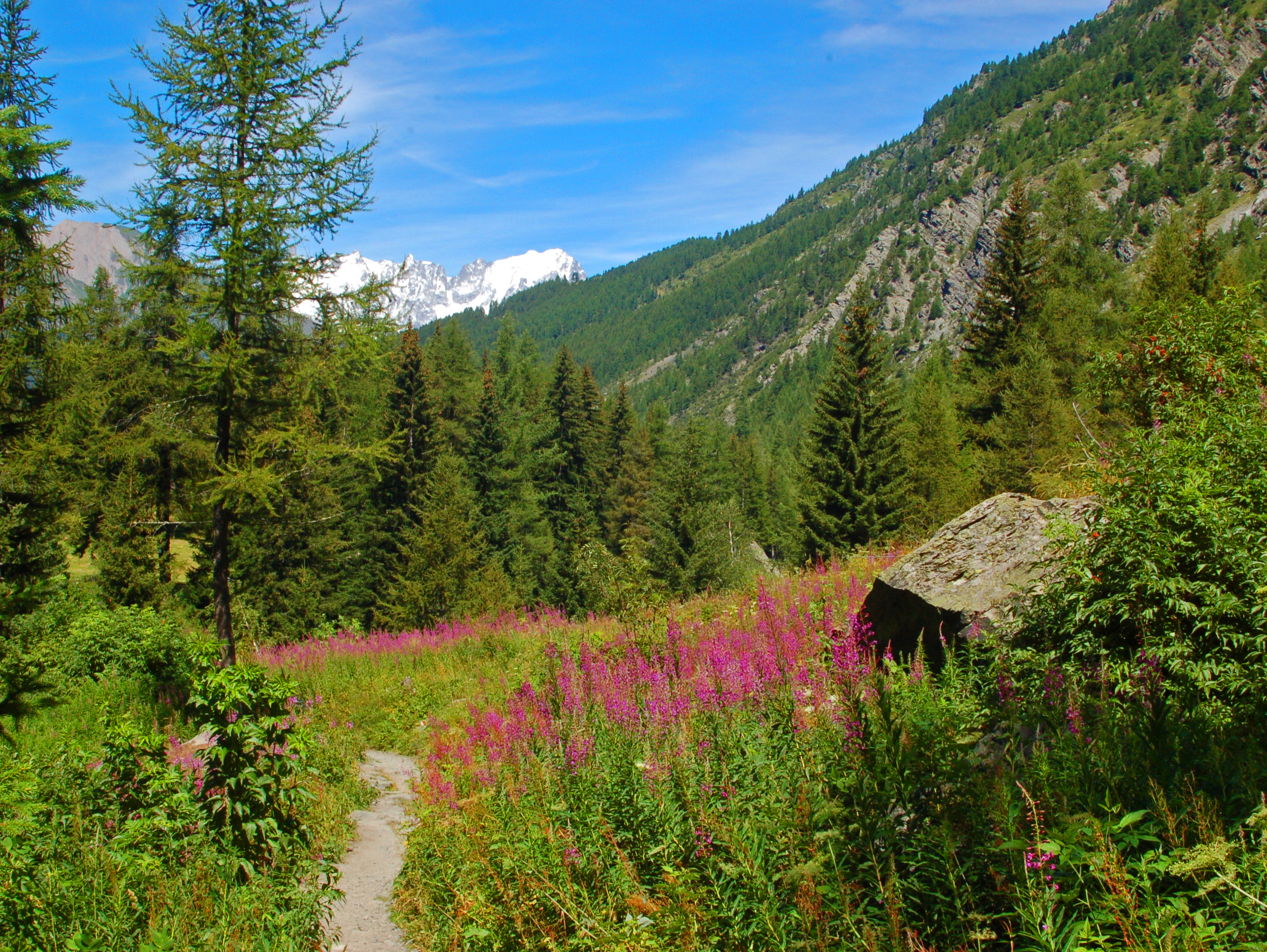
Habitat of Parnassius apollo in La Thuile, Italy, at about 2700 m above sea level

It is also present in some areas of central Asia (Sakha). Typical of high altitudes, its mountain habitat ranges from 400 metres (1,300 ft) up to 2,300 metres (7,500 ft), although it is far more present above 1,000 metres (3,300 ft).

The species requires specific climatic conditions, of cold winters and sunny summers. It also requires wide open spaces, with a cover of shrubs less than 5%, and a large surface of lawns (at least 50%). The presence of the host plant for their caterpillars is critical.

== Description ==
Parnassius apollo has a wingspan of 62–86 millimetres (2.4–3.4 in) in males, of 65–95 millimetres (2.6–3.7 in) in females. The Apollo butterfly shows a great deal of individual variation in appearance, with an evident colour polymorphism. These very large, beautiful and conspicuous white butterflies are decorated with five large black eyespots on the forewing and two bright red or sometimes orange eyespots on the hindwing. These striking red eyespots can vary in size and form depending on the geographic location of the Apollo butterfly, and the bright red colour often fades in the sun, causing the eyespots of older individuals to appear more orange. The wings are shiny, with slightly transparent edges; some individuals are darker (sphragismelanistic), a general phenomenon common in many butterflies. The caterpillars of this species are velvety black with orange-red spots along the sides.

Related species can be found all over the world. The clouded Apollo (Parnassius mnemosyne) lives in valleys. while the small Apollo (Parnassius phoebus) is found in high mountain habitats. The latter has strongly marked black and white antennae, with presence of two red spots near the apex of its forewings.

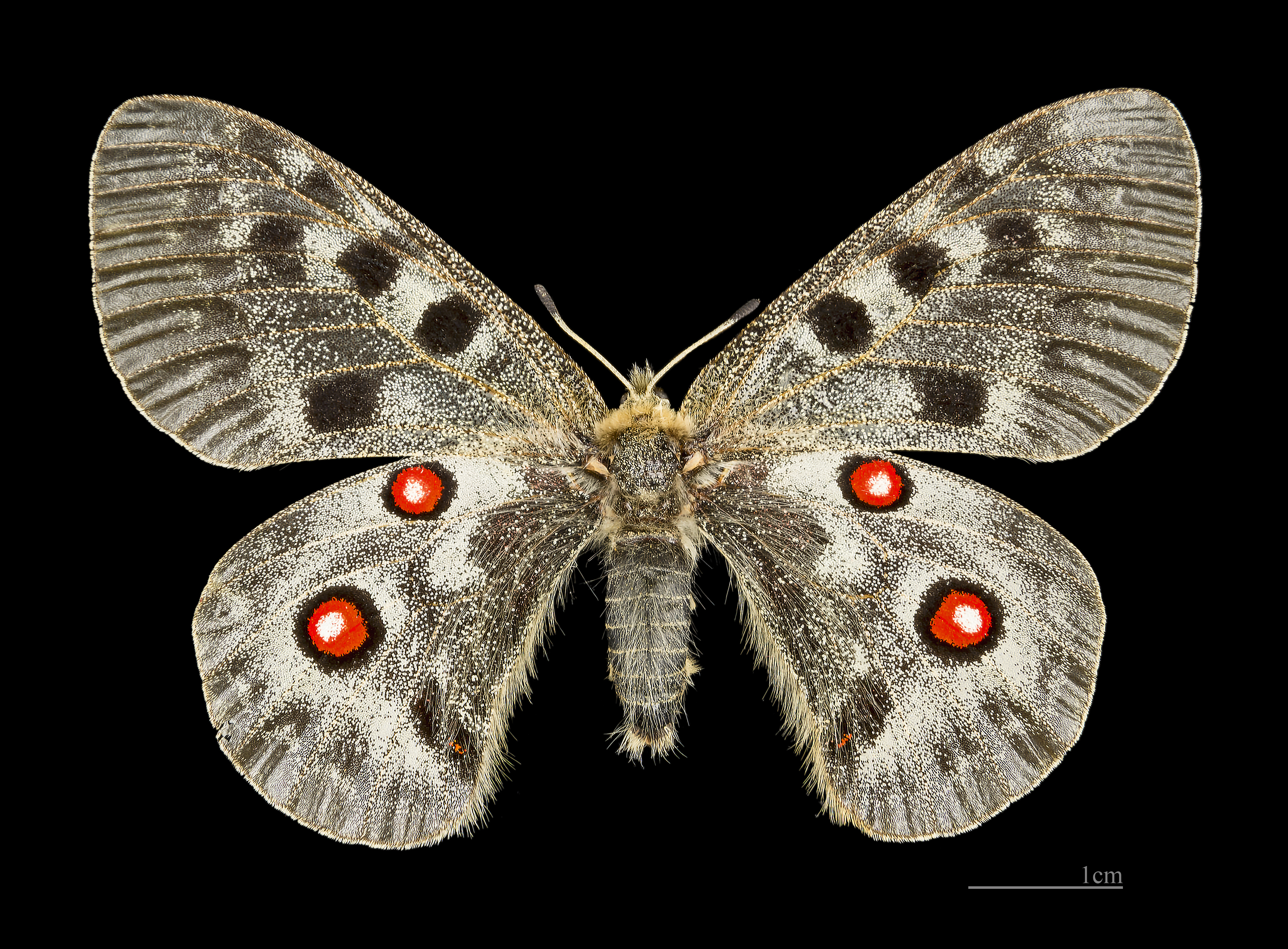
Female

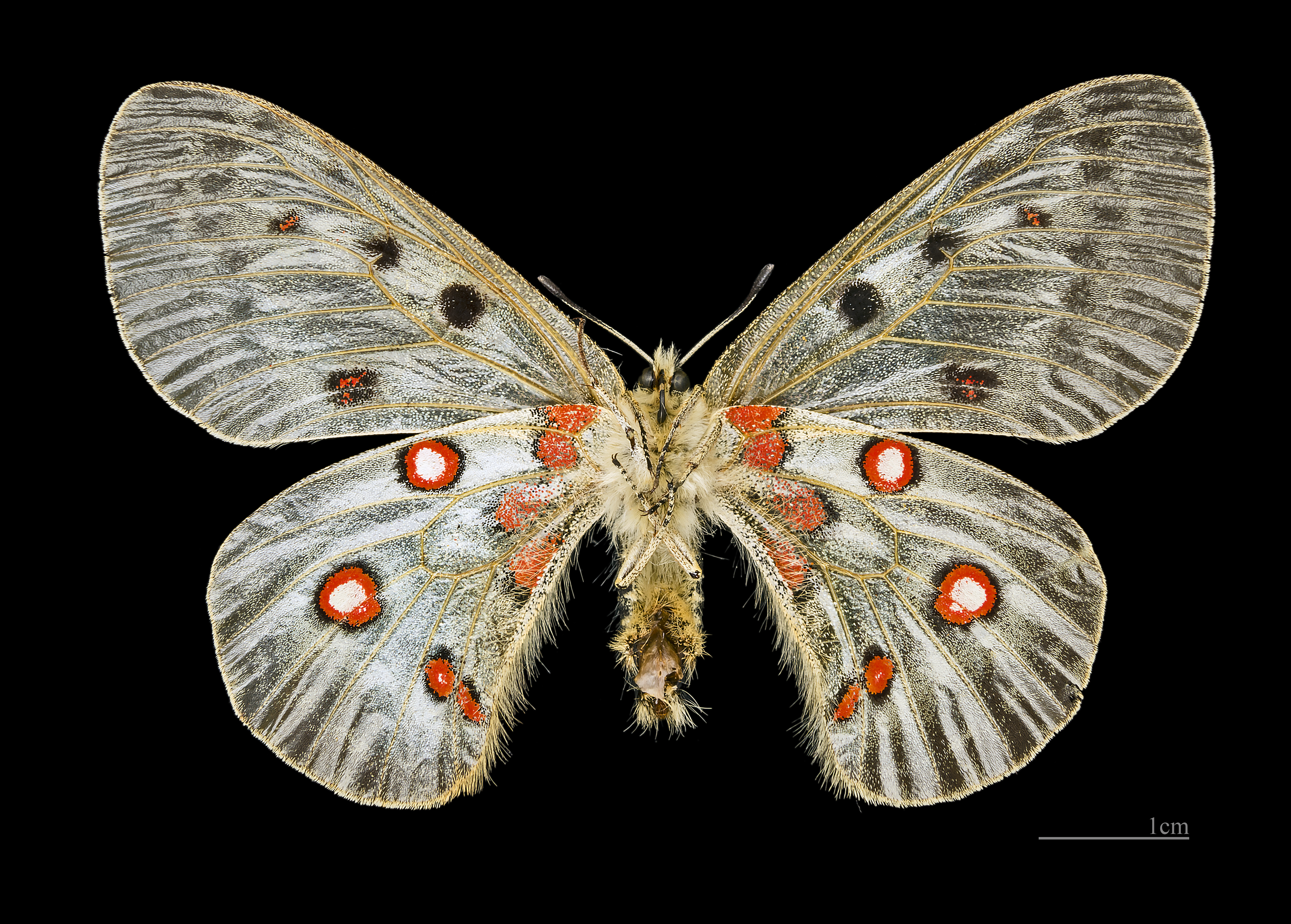
Female, bottom

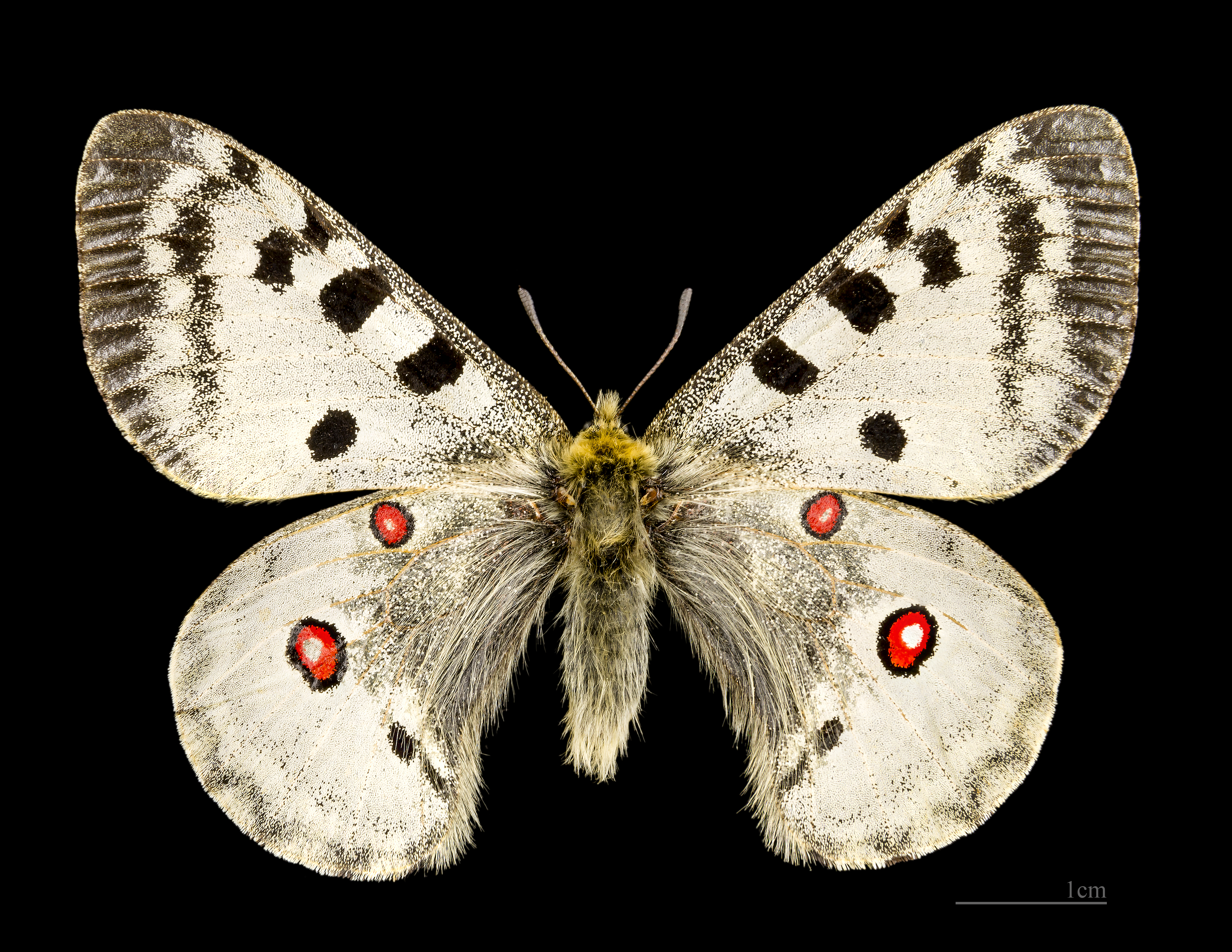
Male

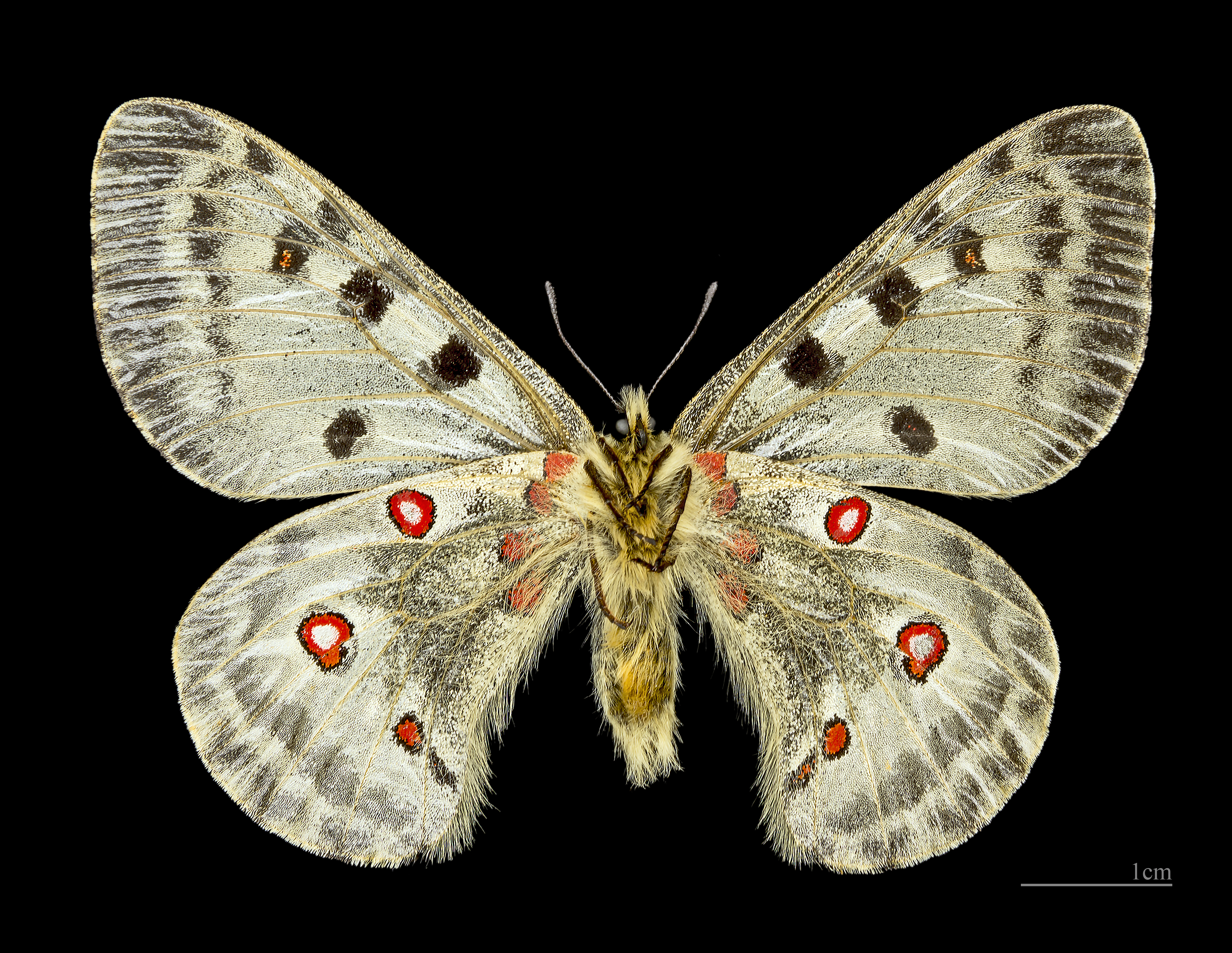
Male, bottom

=== Distribution of colour variation ===
The drastic climate change of the Pleistocene era forced a separation of the red Apollo butterfly population. This in turn played a role in creating the distinct colour changes seen in the species. The Parnassius apollo became divided and isolated in the Eurasian region during the glacial period. The large glaciers created a physical barrier between the population, barring interaction between the groups. Still within these isolated populations the butterflies migrated westward into portions of southern Europe where they settled and reproduced. Within all of these particular isolated populations there is also variation in the wing colour allele. There is variation in size between the isolated populations. With the larger separated populations of butterflies these habitats are used to sustain populations with larger amount of resources. These larger populations are called metapopulations and with the smaller separated sub-populations they create a mainland-island system. The Parnassius apollo can migrate from habitats and thus create a variation seen in each isolated population.

=== Distribution pattern effects on survival rate ===
New environmental pressures lead to the selection of a better suited colour variant within these isolated populations. With this variety there is a correlation with extinction. In high variation environments there is cause for extinction in greater numbers of individuals. For example, there is high variation in the Swiss Alps and presently there is a high rate of individuals becoming extinct. One of the probable causes of extinction is the warming of the climate. It is said that the red Apollo is an "atypical glacial invader" and that with the warming of the climate in mountainous regions is causing the butterfly to not readily adapt to such an uncomfortable environment. Another possible cause of extinction is the interesting connection between nectar plant distribution and the Parnassius apollo. If there was present a constraint of migration from nectar plant populations to another the red Apollo's population would slowly dissipate and reproduction might seize. This is because the outcrop of the nectar plants are the sight of reproduction and if the spatial structure is too far for the butterfly to migrate to the dynamics of the population is in danger.

== Ecology ==
This species has a single brood. Adult Apollo butterflies are seen on the wing from May to September, feeding on nectar produced by flowers. During mating males deposit on the female's abdomen a gelatinous secretion called sphragis, that prevents the female mating a second time. The females lay eggs, which over-winter and hatch in spring the following year. The Apollo caterpillar has a velvety blue black with small orange spots. These caterpillars feed on stonecrop (Sedum species, mainly Sedum telephium, Sedum album, Sedum rupestre and Sedum ropsea), Hylotelephium caucasicum and houseleek (Sempervivum species). When the caterpillar is fully grown it will pupate on the ground, forming a loose cocoon from which the adult butterfly emerges following metamorphosis.

Life cycle of Parnassius apollo

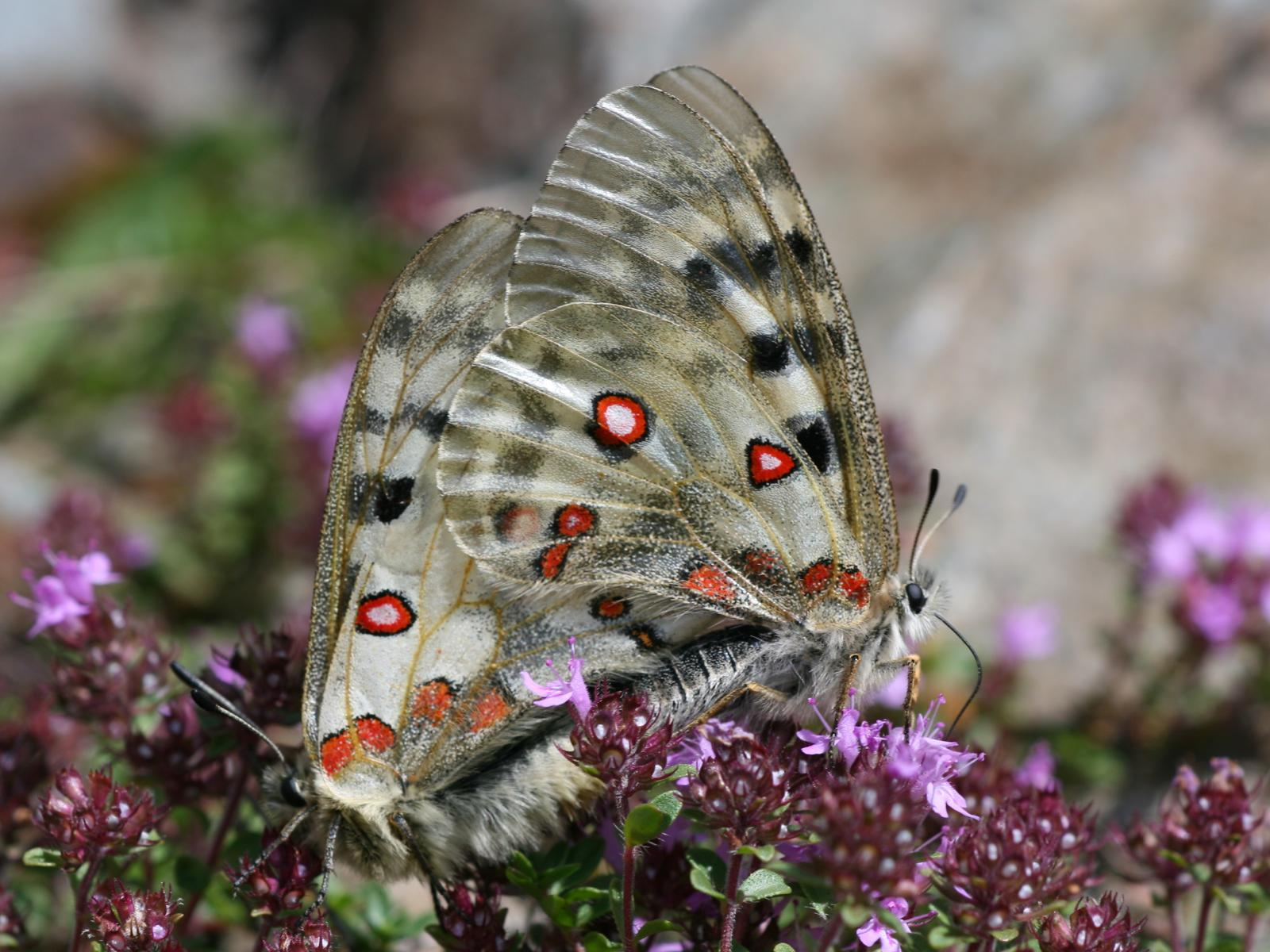
Mating pair

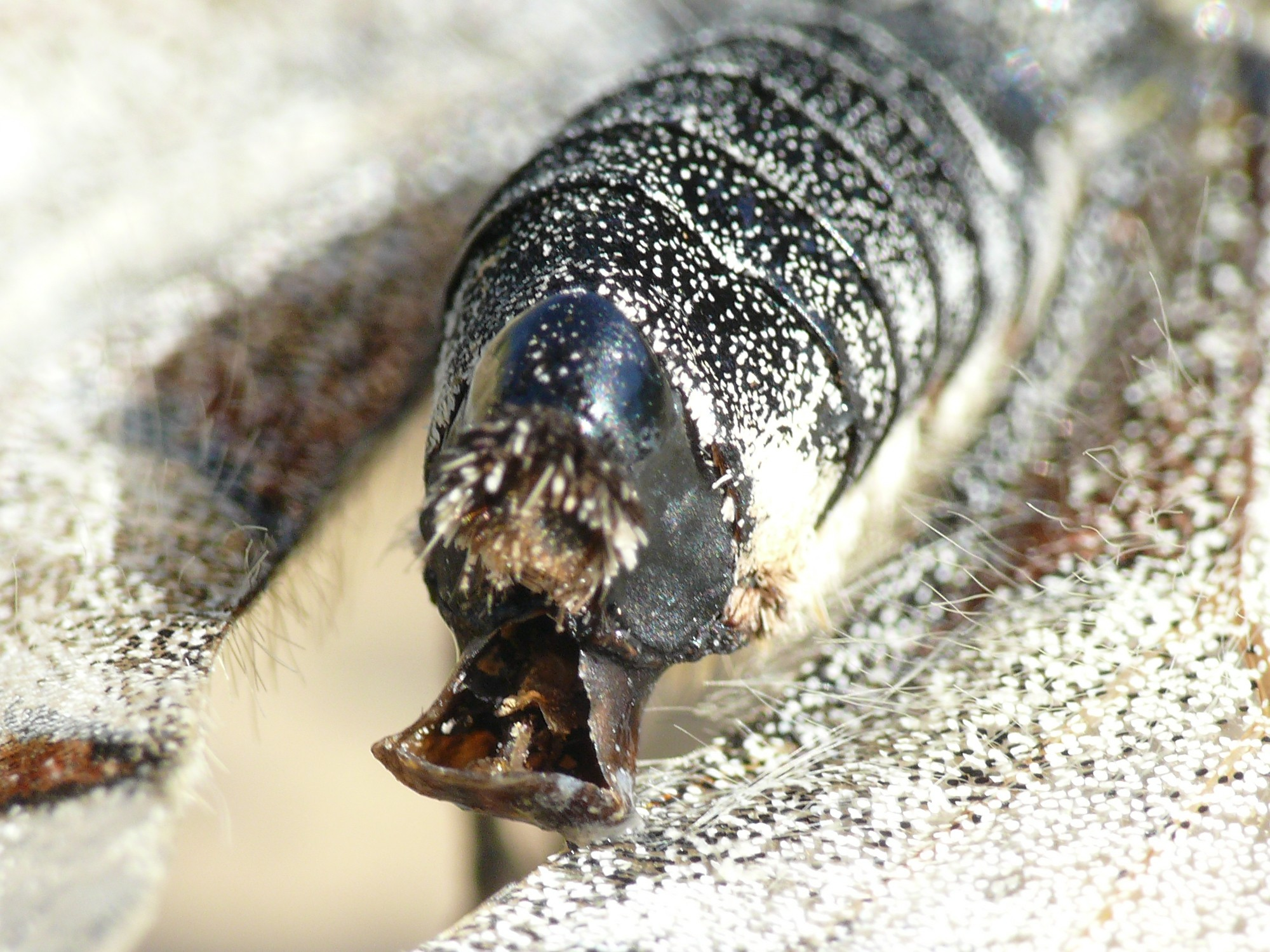
Sphragis on a female

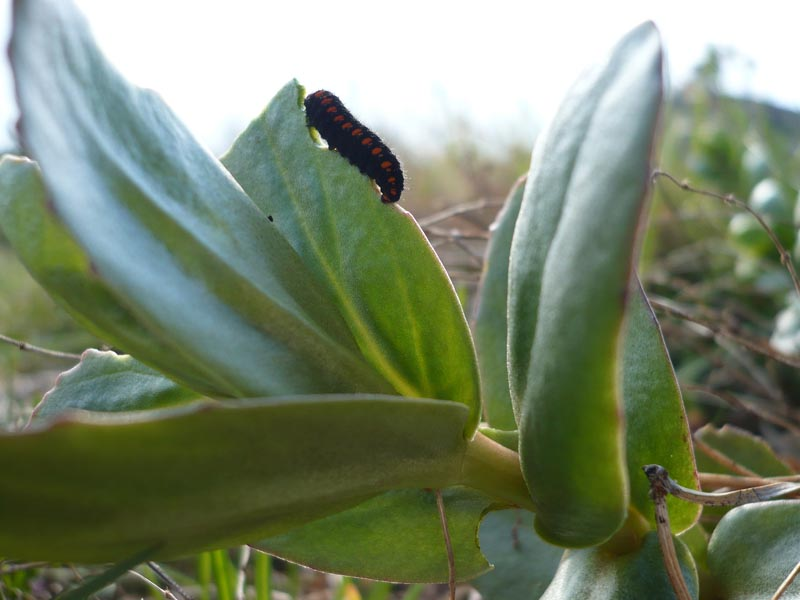
Caterpillar

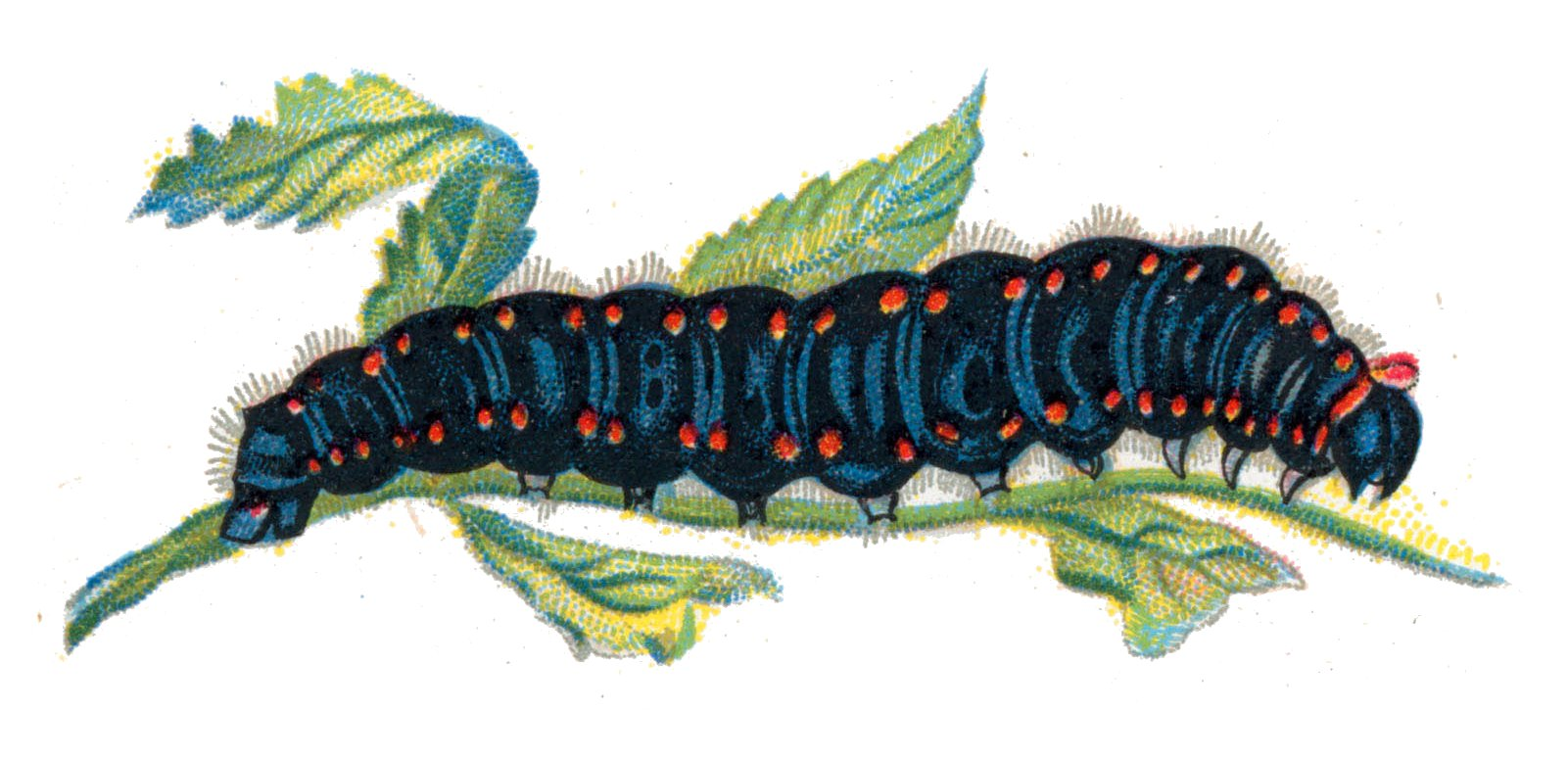
Caterpillar

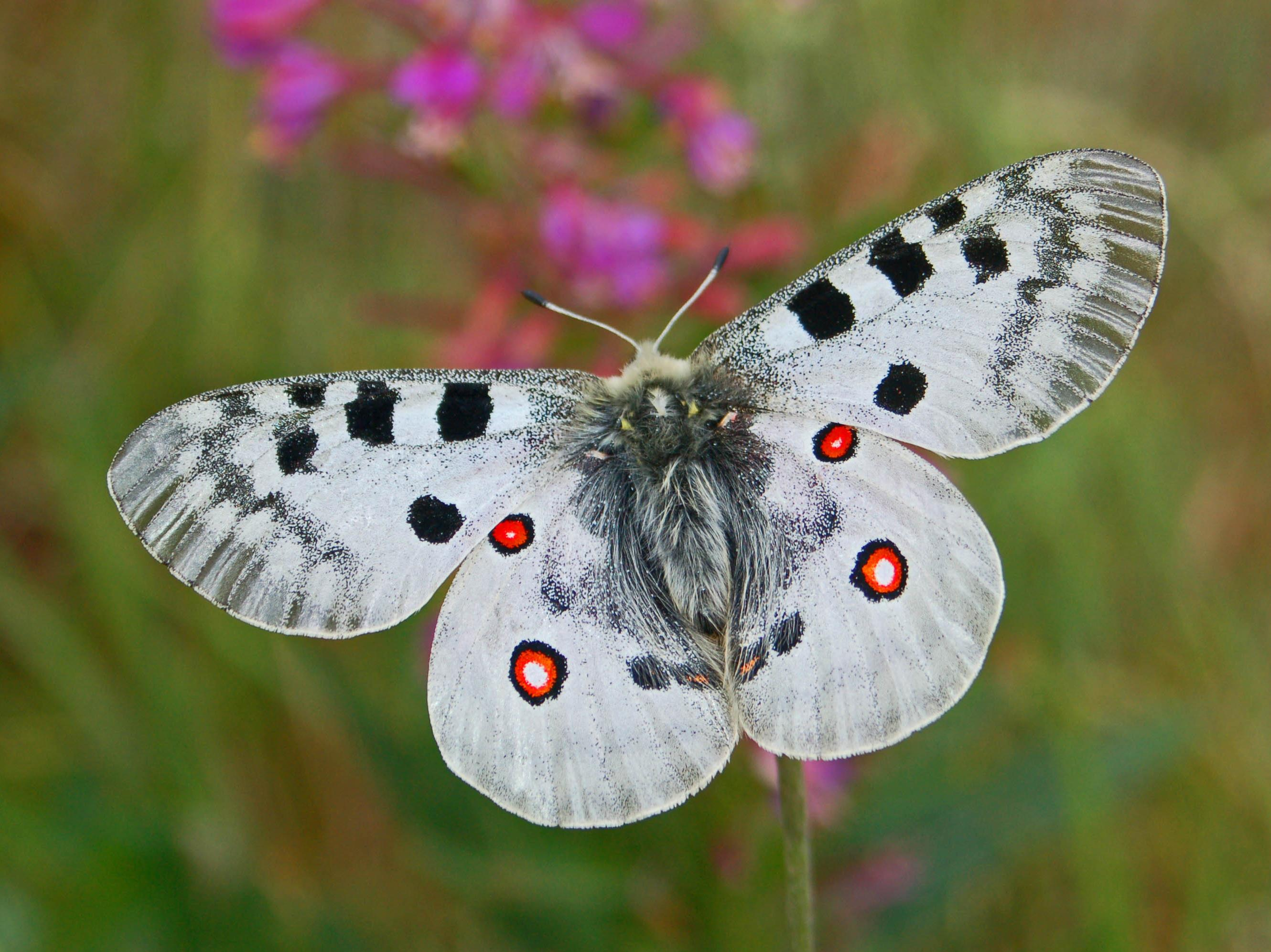
Imago

== Predation and defensive strategy ==
The Apollo butterfly shares a variety of defensive strategies with quite a few species of butterflies. Even from a young age larva exhibit camouflage by being entirely black. This solid colour helps them avoid detection even at a close distance. However, as they mature, they lose this advantage by developing two rows of orange dots. These dots greatly decrease the amount of crypsis. In addition to this larval camouflage, the larva also shares in a form of Müllerian mimicry with a type of millipede, Glomeris (Glomeris guttata). Both animals share the characteristic orange spots and black body and a common habitat. The millipedes and caterpillars secrete a foul smelling odour to repel predators.

Once the butterfly completes its metamorphosis, it has a number of defensive mechanisms in place to avoid predation. One of the most easily identifiable traits is the bright eyespots found on the wings. These eyespots are essentially concentric circle of a wide variety of colours. Apart from the wide range of colours, eyespots are very limited in their plasticity. There are three main hypothesis to why these spots may have developed; they resemble the eyes of an enemy of the predator in order to intimidate them, they draw the attention of the predator to less vital components of the butterfly's body, or the spots are there simply to surprise the predator. The only disadvantage to these spots is that they cause the butterfly to be a great deal more conspicuous.

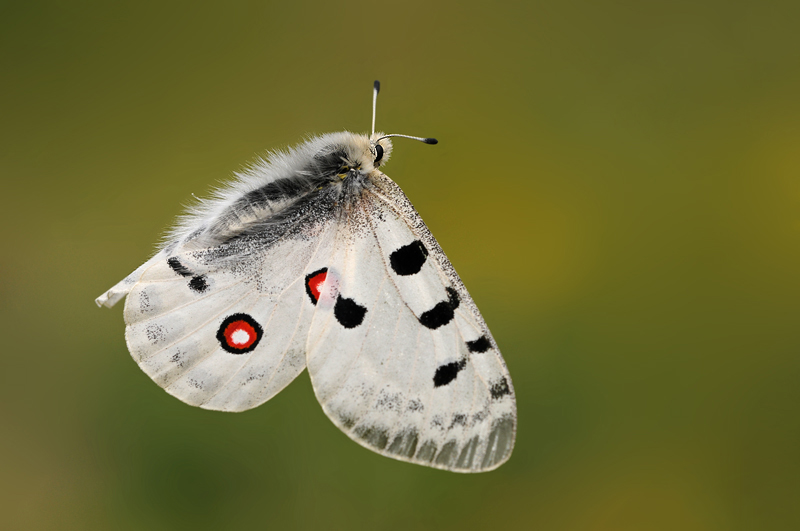
In flight

Another form of defence is the taste of the butterfly. Similar to the monarch butterfly, the Apollo butterfly produces a repulsive taste to its predator. The butterfly seems to get this foul taste from its plant host, the Sedum stenopetalum. There is a bitter tasting cyanoglucoside, sarmentonsin, which is found in both the butterfly and the plant. There is a much higher concentration of sarmentonsin in the wings as opposed to the rest of the body. The high concentration in the wings indicates that the wings of the butterfly would taste much worse comparatively. A common predator, nesting water pipits, have evolved a strategy to avoid the poor taste of the butterfly; the bird will remove the wings before consuming the body. In theory, this will get rid of the poor tasting elements of the butterfly, leaving only the nutritious body.

== Conservation ==
This species is of interest to entomologists due to the variety of subspecies, often only restricted to a specific valley in the Alps. The beautiful Apollo butterfly has long been prized by collectors, who aim to possess as many of the variants as possible. While over-collecting is believed to have caused populations to decline in some areas, such as in Spain and Italy, habitat change is thought to be a far more significant threat to this species' survival. Plantations of conifers, the succession of suitable habitat to scrubland, agriculture, and urbanization have all reduced the habitat of the Apollo butterfly. Climate change and acid rain have also been implicated in this species decline in Fennoscandia. In addition, motor vehicles have been cited as a cause of Apollo butterfly mortalities; vehicles on a motorway system near Bolzano in South Tyrol, Italy, are said to have nearly wiped out a race of the Apollo.

In Finland, the Apollo was one of the first species of insects declared endangered. The Apollo population in Finland and Sweden decreased drastically during the 1950s. The reason for this is not known, but it is commonly thought to be because of a disease. In Sweden, it is now restricted to areas that have limestone in the ground, suggesting that the decrease could hypothetically be related to acid rain.

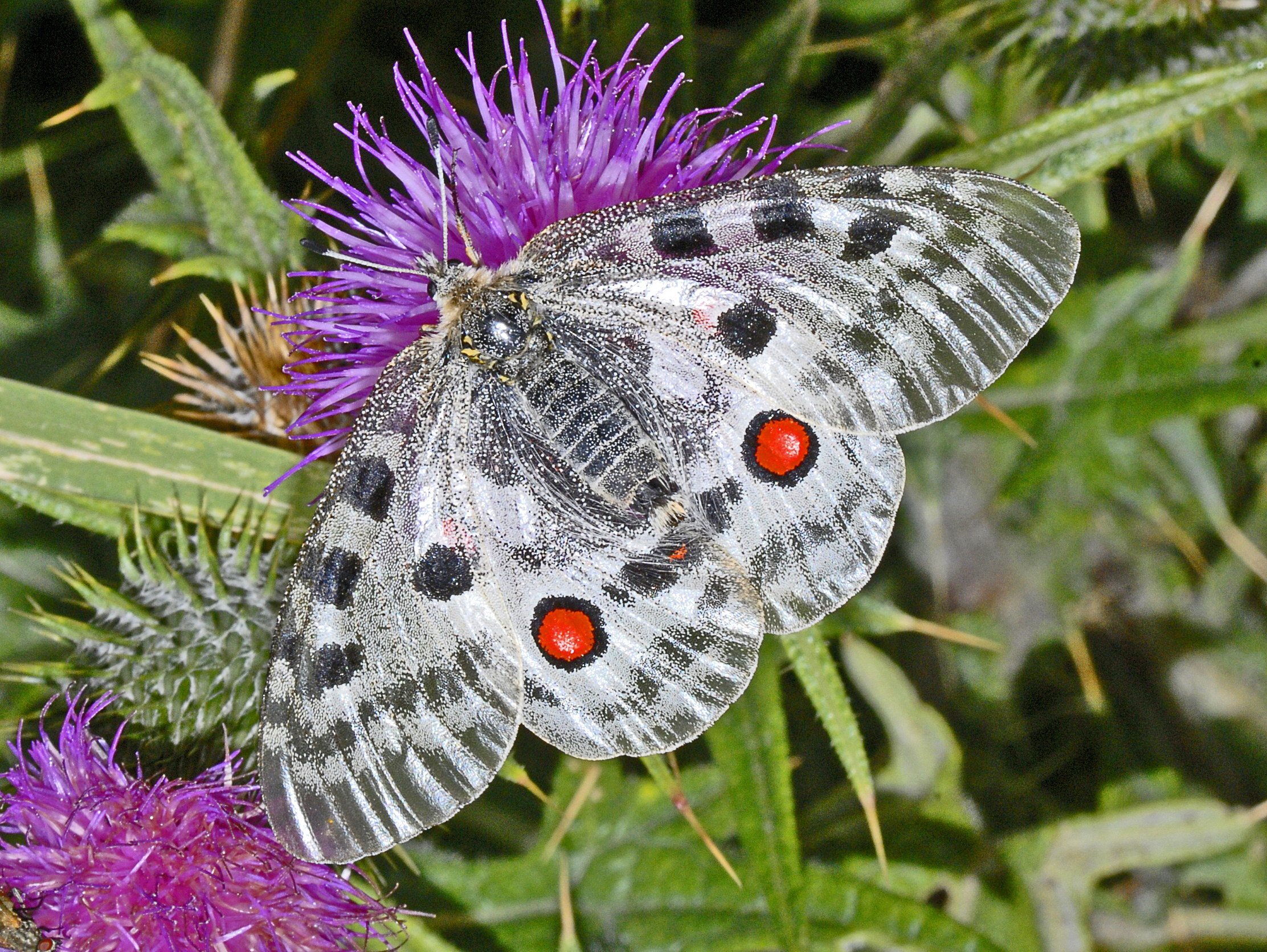
The Apollo

Laws exist to protect the Apollo butterfly in many countries. It was the first butterfly to be protected by law; the German Emperor Wilhelm I leading efforts to secure the species. The Apollo is on the IUCN Red List of Threatened Species, in Appendix II in CITES, and is mentioned in annex IV of Habitats Directive. It is protected in other states: the Principality of Liechtenstein, Czech Republic (as critically threatened species in Czech code, Decree for implementation, No. 395/1992 Sb., and No. 175/2006 Sb.), Turkey and Poland.

However, these laws focus on the protection of individuals, rather than their habitat, and so may do little to mitigate the greatest threat that populations face. Fortunately, there are a number of projects specifically working to save this vulnerable insect. A conservation programme in Pieniny National Park saved a subspecies of the Apollo butterfly that had declined to just 20 individuals in the early 1990s, through a combination of captive breeding and habitat protection. In south-west Germany, conservationists are working with shepherds to ensure favourable conditions for the butterflies, which share their grassland habitat with sheep. For example, grazing periods have been shifted to avoid the Apollo butterfly larvae stage, which is vulnerable to being trampled.

The Apollo butterfly has many subspecies around the world, and some European subspecies are showing an alarming decline in numbers. This is mainly caused by habitat destruction, air pollution affecting the insect's food plants, and butterfly collectors. The Apollo butterfly is also more vulnerable to predators as it spends two years as a caterpillar.
