= Lactobacillus delbrueckii subsp. lactis =

Scientific classification
- Domain: Bacteria
- Kingdom: Bacillati
- Phylum: Bacillota
- Class: Bacilli
- Order: Lactobacillales
- Family: Lactobacillaceae
- Genus: Lactobacillus
- Species: L. delbrueckii
- Subspecies: L. d. subsp. lactis

Trinomial name
- Lactobacillus delbrueckii subsp. lactis (Orla-Jensen 1919) Rogosa & Hansen 1971 Weiss et al. 1984

Subspecies of bacteria, used in cobalamin quantification

Lactobacillus delbrueckii subsp. lactis is a subspecies of Lactobacillus delbrueckii that is generally used to measure the amount of cobalamin in food. Its growth rate is proportional to the amount of cobalamin in the growth medium. However, lactis has been demonstrated to have the option to utilize pseudocobalamin, which is inactive for humans, as well as "alkali-resistant factors" (deoxyribosides and deoxynucleotides), leading to an overestimation of the amount of cobalamine in food. As such, new methods using HPTLC or LC-MS/MS have also been developed.
