= 5,6-Dimethylbenzimidazole =

Names
- Preferred IUPAC name 5,6-Dimethyl-1H-1,3-benzimidazole

Identifiers
| CAS Number | 582-60-5 |
| 3D model (JSmol) | Interactive image |
| Beilstein Reference | 116595 |
| ChEBI | CHEBI:15890 |
| ChEMBL | ChEMBL351132 |
| ChemSpider | 655 |
| DrugBank | DB02591 |
| ECHA InfoCard | 100.008.627 |
| EC Number | 209-488-1 |
| Gmelin Reference | 279255 |
| KEGG | C03114 |
| PubChem CID | 675 |
| UNII | 553XI1DS20 |
| CompTox Dashboard (EPA) | DTXSID70870631 |
- InChI: InChI=1S/C9H10N2/c1-6-3-8-9(4-7(6)2)11-5-10-8/h3-5H,1-2H3,(H,10,11) Key: LJUQGASMPRMWIW-UHFFFAOYSA-N; InChI=1/C9H10N2/c1-6-3-8-9(4-7(6)2)11-5-10-8/h3-5H,1-2H3,(H,10,11) Key: LJUQGASMPRMWIW-UHFFFAOYAV
- SMILES: CC1=CC2=C(C=C1C)N=CN2

Properties
| Chemical formula | C_{9}H_{10}N_{2} |
| Molar mass | 146.193 g·mol^{−1} |

Hazards
- GHS labelling
| Pictograms | (GHS07: Exclamation mark) |
| Signal word | Warning |
| Hazard statements | H302, H315, H319, H335, H412 |
| Precautionary statements | P261, P264, P270, P271, P273, P280, P301+P312, P302+P352, P304+P340, P305+P351+P338, P312, P321, P330, P332+P313, P337+P313, P362, P403+P233, P405, P501 |
- Except where otherwise noted, data are given for materials in their standard state (at 25 °C [77 °F], 100 kPa). Infobox references

5,6-Dimethylbenzimidazole (DMB) is a naturally occurring derivative of benzimidazole with two methyl groups as substituents on the benzene ring.

5,6-Dimethylbenzimidazole is biosynthesized from flavin mononucleotide by the enzyme 5,6-dimethylbenzimidazole synthase.

== Occurrence and uses ==
=== Biological significance ===
5,6-Dimethylbenzimidazole is a substructure of true vitamin B_{12}, where it serves as one of the ligands for the cobalt atom. In part of one of the pathways for cobalamin biosynthesis, DMB is a substrate for nicotinate-nucleotide—dimethylbenzimidazole phosphoribosyltransferase. One form of pseudovitamin B_{12}, i.e. a compound usable by B_{12}-dependent lactic acid bacteria but not by humans, has this group replaced with adenyl. Despite production of pseudo B_{12} in groups as distantly related as lactic acid bacteria and Cyanobacteria, DMB is preferred over adenine by the vast majority of versions of CobT, the enzyme responsible for making the active phosphoribosylated "lower group" of cobalamin.

=== Medicinal chemistry ===
Researchers have explored the pharmacological properties of benzimidazole derivatives, with some displaying antimicrobial, antiviral, anticancer, and antifungal activities. The specific medicinal properties of 5,6-dimethylbenzimidazole may vary based on its structural features and substituents.
