= 5,6-dimethylbenzimidazole synthase =

Class of enzymes

Identifiers
- EC no.: 1.14.99.40

Databases
- IntEnz: IntEnz view
- BRENDA: BRENDA entry
- ExPASy: NiceZyme view
- KEGG: KEGG entry
- MetaCyc: metabolic pathway
- PRIAM: profile
- PDB structures: RCSB PDB PDBe PDBsum
Search
- PMC: articles
- PubMed: articles
- NCBI: proteins

5,6-dimethylbenzimidazole synthase (EC 1.14.99.40, BluB) is an enzyme with systematic name FMNH_{2} oxidoreductase (5,6-dimethylbenzimidazole forming). This enzyme catalyses the following chemical reaction

FMNH_{2} + NADH + H^{+} + O_{2} $\rightleftharpoons$ 5,6-dimethylbenzimidazole + D-erythrose 4-phosphate + NAD^{+} + other product

The C-2 of 5,6-dimethylbenzimidazole is derived from C-1' of the ribityl group of FMNH_{2} and 2-H from the ribityl 1'-pro-S hydrogen. This enzyme is part of the biosynthetic pathway to cobalamin (vitamin B_{12}) in bacteria.

== See also ==
- Cobalamin biosynthesis
