= Nicotinate-nucleotide—dimethylbenzimidazole phosphoribosyltransferase =

Class of enzymes

Nicotinate-nucleotide-dimethylbenzimidazole phosphoribosyltransferase

Identifiers
- EC no.: 2.4.2.21
- CAS no.: 37277-76-2

Databases
- BRENDA: enzyme data
- ExPASy: NiceZyme view
- KEGG: enzyme entry
- MetaCyc: metabolic pathway
- Rhea: reactions
- PDB structures: RCSB PDB PDBe PDBsum
- Gene Ontology: AmiGO / QuickGO
Search
- PMC: articles
- PubMed: articles
- NCBI: proteins

Phosphoribosyltransferase
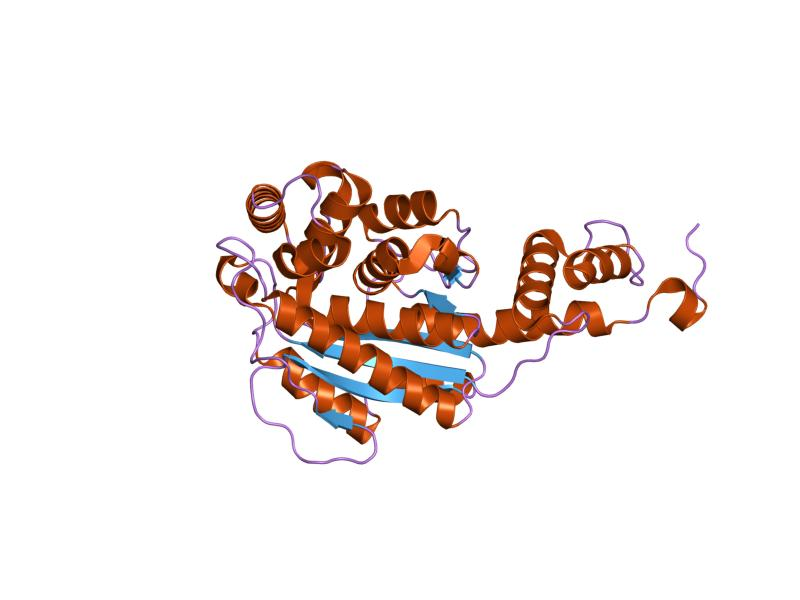
- crystal structure of cobt from thermus thermophilus hb8

Identifiers
- Symbol: DBI_PRT
- Pfam: PF02277
- InterPro: IPR003200
- SCOP2: 1d0s / SCOPe / SUPFAM
- CDD: cd02439
Available protein structures:
- PDB: IPR003200 PF02277 (ECOD; PDBsum)
- AlphaFold: IPR003200; PF02277

Nicotinate-nucleotide-dimethylbenzimidazole phosphoribosyltransferase (EC 2.4.2.21) is an enzyme that catalyzes the chemical reaction

nicotinate mononucleotide + 5,6-dimethylbenzimidazole $\rightleftharpoons$ nicotinic acid + α-ribazole 5'-phosphate

The reaction is part of the biosynthesis of cobalamin (a form of vitamin B_{12}) in bacteria.

This enzyme is a glycosyltransferase, specifically a pentosyltransferase. The systematic name of this enzyme class is nicotinate-nucleotide:5,6-dimethylbenzimidazole phospho-D-ribosyltransferase. Other names in common use include CobT, nicotinate mononucleotide-dimethylbenzimidazole phosphoribosyltransferase, nicotinate ribonucleotide:benzimidazole (adenine) phosphoribosyltransferase, nicotinate-nucleotide:dimethylbenzimidazole phospho-D-ribosyltransferase, and nicotinate mononucleotide (NaMN):5,6-dimethylbenzimidazole phosphoribosyltransferase.

== Function ==
This enzyme plays a central role in the synthesis of α-ribazole 5'-phosphate, an intermediate for the lower ligand of cobalamin. It is one of the enzymes in the anaerobic pathway of cobalamin biosynthesis, and one of the four proteins (CobU, CobT, CobC, and CobS) involved in the synthesis of the lower ligand and the assembly of the nucleotide loop. The reaction replaces the nicotinic acid group in nicotinate mononucleotide by reaction with 5,6-dimethylbenzimidazole (5,6-DMB), with inversion of stereochemistry.

5,6-DMB
+
nicotinate mononucleotide
Nicotinic acid
+
α-ribazole 5'-phosphate

== Biosynthesis of cobalamin ==
Vitamin B_{12} (cobalamin) is used as a cofactor in a number of enzyme-catalysed reactions in bacteria, archaea and eukaryotes. The biosynthetic pathway to adenosylcobalamin from its five-carbon precursor, 5-aminolaevulinic acid, can be divided into three sections: (1) the biosynthesis of uroporphyrinogen III from 5-aminolaevulinic acid; (2) the conversion of uroporphyrinogen III into the ring-contracted, deacylated intermediate precorrin 6 or cobalt-precorrin 6; and (3) the transformation of this intermediate to form adenosylcobalamin. Cobalamin is synthesised by bacteria and archaea via two alternative routes that differ primarily in the steps of section 2 that lead to the contraction of the macrocycle and excision of the extruded carbon molecule (and its attached methyl group). One pathway (exemplified by Pseudomonas denitrificans) incorporates molecular oxygen into the macrocycle as a prerequisite to ring contraction, and has consequently been termed the aerobic pathway. The alternative, anaerobic, route (exemplified by Salmonella typhimurium) takes advantage of a chelated cobalt ion, in the absence of oxygen, to set the stage for ring contraction.

== Structural studies ==
As of late 2007, 28 structures have been solved for this class of enzymes, with PDB accession codes PDB: 1D0S, PDB: 1D0V, PDB: 1JH8, PDB: 1JHA, PDB: 1JHM, PDB: 1JHP, PDB: 1JHQ, PDB: 1JHR, PDB: 1JHU, PDB: 1JHV, PDB: 1JHX, PDB: 1JHY, PDB: 1L4B, PDB: 1L4E, PDB: 1L4F, PDB: 1L4G, PDB: 1L4H, PDB: 1L4K, PDB: 1L4L, PDB: 1L4M, PDB: 1L4N, PDB: 1L5F, PDB: 1L5K, PDB: 1L5L, PDB: 1L5M, PDB: 1L5N, PDB: 1L5O, and PDB: 1WX1.
