= COS cells =

Cell lines derived from monkey kidney tissue

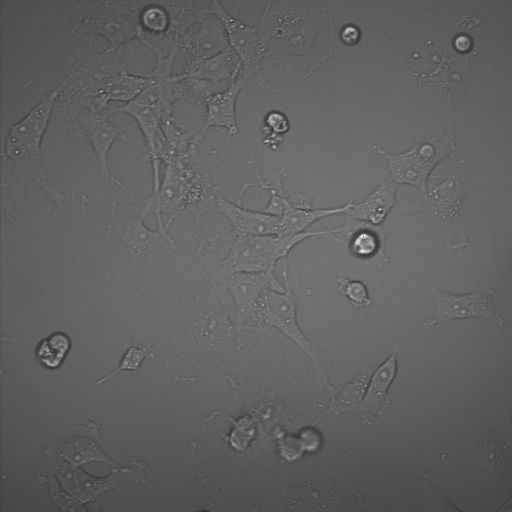
COS-7 cells, 40X magnification

COS are fibroblast-like cell lines derived from monkey kidney tissue. COS cells are obtained by immortalizing CV-1 cells with a version of the SV40 virus that can produce large T antigen but has a defect in genomic replication. The CV-1 cell line in turn was derived from the kidney of the African green monkey.

The acronym "COS" is derived from the cells being CV-1 (simian) in Origin, and carrying the SV40 genetic material. Three COS lines were created (COS-1, COS-3 and COS-7), of which two are commonly used (COS-1 and COS-7).

== Applications ==
The COS cell lines are often used by biologists when studying the monkey virus SV40. Cells from these lines are also often transfected to produce recombinant proteins for molecular biology, biochemistry, and cell biology experiments.

When an expression construct with an SV40 origin of replication is introduced into COS cells, the vector can be replicated substantially by the large T antigen. These COS cells are genetically modified to produce the T antigen from their own genome.
