= Cycloprolylproline =

Organic compound

Cyclo(prolylprolyl)
- Skeletal formula of cyclo(prolylprolyl)

Names
- Preferred IUPAC name (3S,9S)-1,7-diazatricyclo[7.3.0.03,7]dodecane-2,8-dione

Identifiers
| CAS Number | 19943-27-2 |
| 3D model (JSmol) | Interactive image |
| ChEMBL | ChEMBL4473867 |
| ChemSpider | 643859 |
| PubChem CID | 736756 |
| UNII | XGU973420W |
| CompTox Dashboard (EPA) | DTXSID201313224 |
- InChI: InChI=InChI=1S/C10H14N2O2/c13-9-7-3-1-5-11(7)10(14)8-4-2-6-12(8)9/h7-8H,1-6H2/t7-,8-/m0/s1 Key: BKASXWPLSXFART-YUMQZZPRSA-N
- SMILES: C1C[C@H]2C(=O)N3CCC[C@H]3C(=O)N2C1

Properties
| Chemical formula | C_{10}H_{14}N_{2}O_{2} |
| Molar mass | 194.234 g·mol^{−1} |
- Except where otherwise noted, data are given for materials in their standard state (at 25 °C [77 °F], 100 kPa). Infobox references

Cycloprolylproline is an organic compound with the formula C_{10}H_{14}N_{2}O_{2}. It is made of two proline amino acids.

== Occurrence ==
Cycloprolylproline is found naturally in the fungus Aspergillus fumigatus.
