= Bulbus glandis =

Male canine erectile tissue

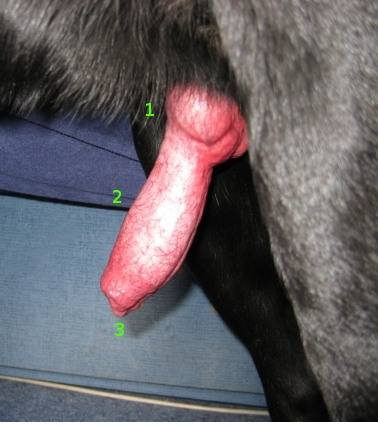
Erect bulbus glandis (1) in a Labrador Retriever

The bulbus glandis (also called a bulb or knot) is an erectile tissue structure on the penis of canid mammals. During mating, immediately before ejaculation the tissues swell up to lock (tie) the male's penis inside the female. The locking is completed by circular muscles just inside the female's vagina; this is called "the knot" tightening thus preventing the male from withdrawing. The circular muscles also contract intermittently, which has the effect of stimulating ejaculation of sperm, followed by prostatic fluid, as well as maintaining the swelling of the penis and therefore the tie, for some time. For domestic dogs the tie may last up to half an hour or more, though usually less. When male canines are sexually excited, the bulbus glandis may swell up inside the penile sheath, even if the dog has been neutered.

The bulbus glandis also occurs in the penises of some pinnipeds, including South American fur seals.

== See also ==
- Canine reproduction
- Mating plug
