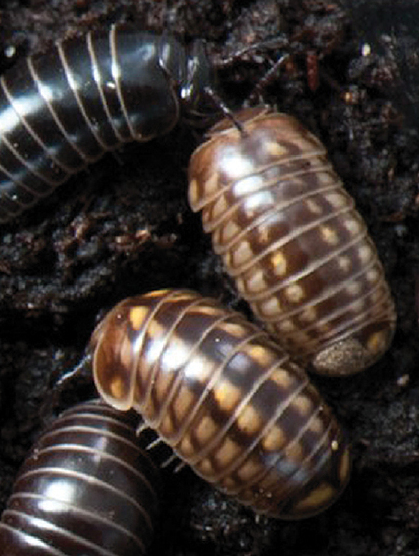
- Glomeris intermedia alongside Glomeris marginata

Scientific classification
- Domain: Eukaryota
- Kingdom: Animalia
- Phylum: Arthropoda
- Subphylum: Myriapoda
- Class: Diplopoda
- Order: Glomerida
- Family: Glomeridae
- Genus: Glomeris
- Species: G. intermedia

Binomial name
- Glomeris intermedia Latzel, 1884

Synonyms
- List: Glomeris connexa alpina var. tenebrosa Latzel, 1884; Glomeris europaea hexasticha var. intermedia Latzel, 1884; Glomeris hexasticha intermedia var. intermedia Latzel, 1884; Glomeris hexasticha var. intermedia Latzel, 1884; Glomeris intermedia intermedia Latzel, 1884; Glomeris intermedia intermedia var. flavolineata Verhoeff, 1908; Glomeris intermedia largesulcata (Attems, 1927); Glomeris intermedia trisulcata var. beatensis Verhoeff, 1906; Glomeris intermedia trisulcata var. gallicorum Verhoeff, 1906; Glomeris intermedia trisulcata var. largesulcata Attems, 1927; Glomeris intermedia trisulcata var. ribauti Verhoeff, 1906; Glomeris intermedia var. biguttata Verhoeff, 1891; Glomeris intermedia var. bonnensis Verhoeff, 1906; Glomeris intermedia var. pallida Verhoeff, 1891; Glomeris intermedia var. palliofera Verhoeff, 1906; Glomeris intermedia var. tenebrosa (Latztel, 1884); Glomeris intermedia var. transversosulcata Verhoeff, 1891

= Glomeris intermedia =

Species of millipede

Glomeris intermedia, also known as the western six-striped pill millipede, is a species of pill millipede within the genus Glomeris and family Glomeridae.

== Description ==
Glomeris intermedia exhibits a range of colours, with individuals displaying a base colour of black, brown, grey or yellow on their body. Additionally, the tergites, which are the hardened dorsal plates covering the segments of the millipede's body, bear several spots that vary in coloration from beige to red in colour. Among the spots present, the middle spot is generally the largest, although it can be smaller or even absent in some individuals. The lateral-most spot extends further forward compared to the middle spot and both spots are sharply demarcated at their anterior boundaries. Notably, the posterior edges of the segments are outlined by a narrow, lightly coloured line, creating a distinct visual pattern. Within the northern distribution range of G. intermedia, the medial row of spots are usually absent.

The final segment of Glomeris intermedia, known as the preanal tergite, exhibits two large bright spots that do not reach the edge of the segment. In males, the pre-anal tergite is slightly lobed, potentially serving as a distinguishing feature between males and females. Furthermore, the second segment, known as the breastplate, displays two to three major furrows, occasionally only one, along with the possibility of having 0 to 2 anterior furrows and 1 to 5 minor furrows.

== Distribution and habitat ==
Glomeris intermedia is native to Western Europe, where it can be found within the countries of: Belgium, France, Germany, Luxembourg, Spain, Switzerland and the Netherlands. The species occurs in elevated forest habitats distributed on hills and mountains. The species is a detritivore, feeding on rotten wood and dead leaves. G. intermedia has a preference for acidic soils.

== Subspecies ==
The following subspecies are recognised:

- Glomeris intermedia trisulcata Rothenbühler, 1899
