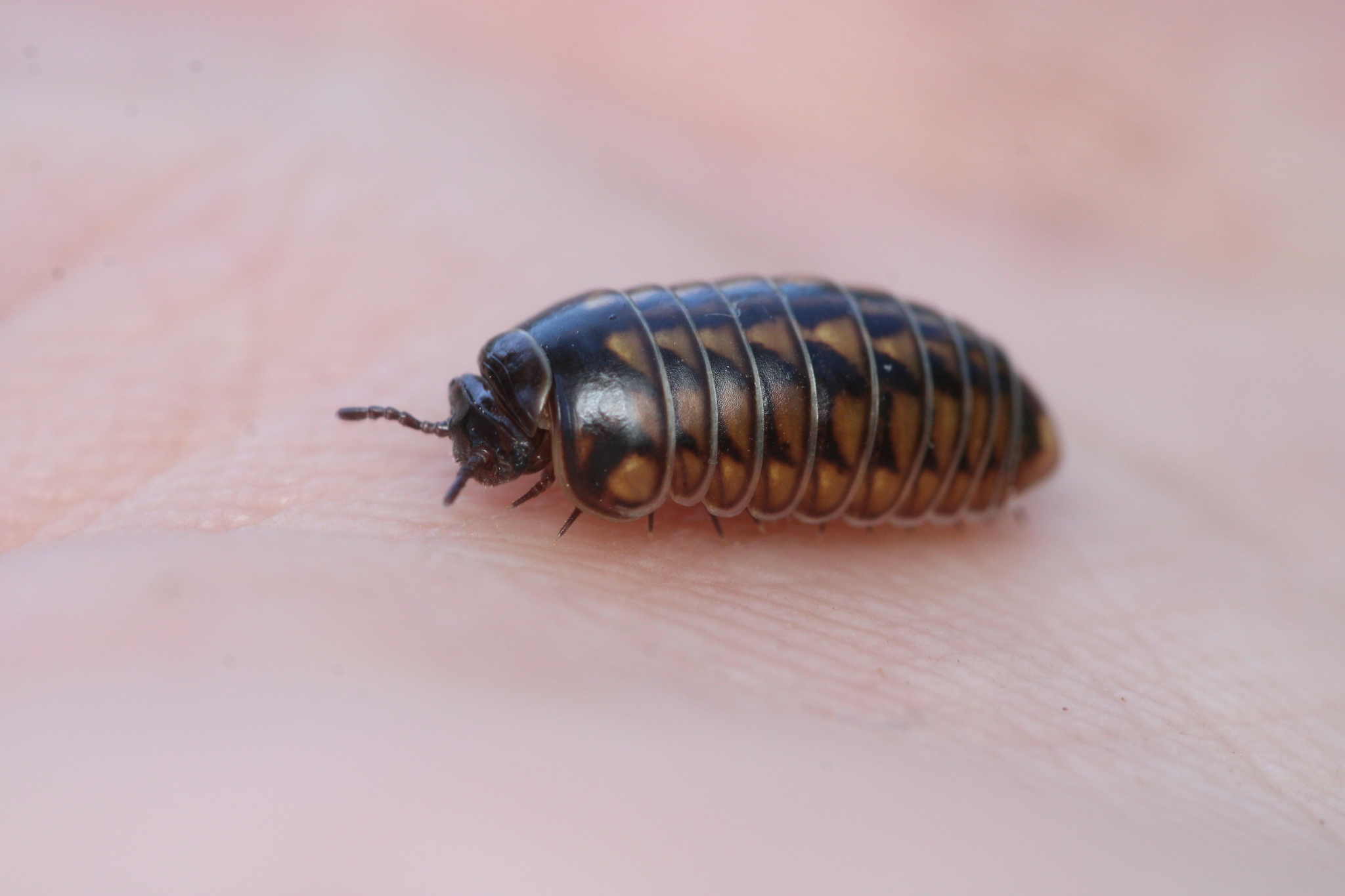

Scientific classification
- Kingdom: Animalia
- Phylum: Arthropoda
- Subphylum: Myriapoda
- Class: Diplopoda
- Order: Glomerida
- Family: Glomeridae
- Genus: Glomeris
- Species: G. hexasticha

Binomial name
- Glomeris hexasticha Brandt, 1833

Synonyms
- List: Eurypleuroglomeris hexasticha (Brandt, 1833); Eurypleuroglomeris hexasticha hexasticha (Brandt, 1833); Glomeris ambigua (Haase, 1886); Glomeris europaea hexasticha (Brandt, 1833); Glomeris hexasticha bavarica var. hungarica (Verhoeff, 1906); Glomeris hexasticha bavarica var. septemseriata (Verhoeff, 1906); Glomeris hexasticha boleti var. austriaca (Attems, 1927); Glomeris hexasticha boleti var. bifurcata (Attems, 1927); Glomeris hexasticha boleti var. boleti (Verhoeff, 1906); Glomeris hexasticha boleti var. kalonota (Attems, 1927); Glomeris hexasticha boleti var. maculosa (Attems, 1927); Glomeris hexasticha boleti var. taeniata (Attems, 1927); Glomeris hexasticha hexasticha (Brandt, 1833); Glomeris hexasticha hexasticha var. ambigua (Haase, 1886); Glomeris hexasticha hexasticha var. analis (Verhoeff, 1906); Glomeris hexasticha hexasticha var. continens (Attems, 1927); Glomeris hexasticha hexasticha var. eremita (Verhoeff, 1906); Glomeris hexasticha hexasticha var. hexasticha (Brandt, 1833); Glomeris hexasticha hexasticha var. jablanicensis (Verhoeff, 1906); Glomeris hexasticha hexasticha var. luctuosa (Attems, 1927); Glomeris hexasticha hexasticha var. marcomannia (Verhoeff, 1906); Glomeris hexasticha hexasticha var. mniszechii (Nowicki, 1870); Glomeris hexasticha hexasticha var. popinacina (Attems, 1927); Glomeris hexasticha hexasticha var. pseudoambigua (Verhoeff, 1906); Glomeris hexasticha hexasticha var. quadrimaculata (Latzel, 1884); Glomeris hexasticha hexasticha var. quadristriata (Haase); Glomeris hexasticha hexasticha var. saxonicorum (Verhoeff, 1906); Glomeris hexasticha hexasticha var. scutoatrata (Verhoeff, 1906); Glomeris hexasticha hexasticha var. szeklerana (Verhoeff, 1906); Glomeris hexasticha hexasticha var. vallicola (Verhoeff, 1906); Glomeris hexasticha marcomannia var. baernsteinensis (Verhoeff, 1927); Glomeris hexasticha marcomannia var. boleti (Verhoeff, 1906); Glomeris hexasticha marcomannia var. graniticola (Verhoeff, 1906); Glomeris hexasticha marcomannia var. marcomannia (Verhoeff, 1906); Glomeris hexasticha marcomannia var. pseudosuevica (Verhoeff, 1911); Glomeris hexasticha marcomannia var. vidovecina (Attems, 1927); Glomeris hexasticha markomannica (Verhoeff, 1906); Glomeris hexasticha rabensteinensis var. medioatrata (Verhoeff, 1906); Glomeris hexasticha rabensteinensis var. pannonica (Verhoeff, 1906); Glomeris hexasticha var. divisa (Haase, 1886); Glomeris hexasticha var. formosa (Latzel, 1884); Glomeris hexasticha var. hexasticha (Brandt, 1833); Glomeris hexasticha var. mniszechii (Nowicki, 1870); Glomeris hexasticha var. obscura (Haase, 1886); Glomeris hexasticha var. quadrimaculata (Latzel, 1884); Glomeris hexasticha var. rubiginosa (Latzel, 1884); Glomeris mniszechi (Nowicki, 1875); Glomeris mniszechii (Nowicki, 1870)

= Glomeris hexasticha =

Species of pill millipede within the genus Glomeris

Glomeris hexasticha, also known as the eastern six-striped pill millipede or the diagonal-striped pill millipede, is a species of pill millipede within the family Glomeridae and order Glomerida. The pill millipede is widely distributed within many European countries, with the species consisting of over twenty subspecies.

== Description ==
The body length of Glomeris hexasticha ranges from 6 to 17 mm long. Its exoskeleton displays a base colour ranging from brown to black, adorned with 7 rows (typically 6 in the eastern populations) of yellow-brown to red-brown spots. These lateral spots on the thoracic plate are large and always well-defined. The 2nd tergite of the species usually possesses a main furrow, accompanied by 0–1 pre-furrow and 2–4 subsidiary furrows. In males, the pre-anal tergite exhibits a prominent bulging of the rear margin, while in females, this bulge is less pronounced. Additionally, the male individuals exhibit a cross bulge above the rear margin.

== Distribution ==
Glomeris hexasticha possess a widespread European distribution where it can be found in the countries of: Albania, Austria, Bosnia and Herzegovina, Bulgaria, Croatia, Czech Republic, Germany, Hungary, Italy, North Macedonia, Poland, Romania, Serbia, Slovakia, Slovenia, Switzerland, Ukraine. The species is also native to Central European Russia, European Turkey and the transcontinental region of the Near East.

== Habitat ==
Glomeris hexasticha mainly inhabitants forests located within montane and subalpine altitudes. Forests can be both deciduous or coniferous, exhibiting tree species such as the common hornbeam (C. betulus) and black pine (Pinus nigra). G. hexasticha has also been discovered to live on forest edges and within meadow habitat, where it is found living alongside wild wheat grasses (Agropyron sp.) and common rosehip (R. canina). G. hexasticha is a detritivore feeding on decaying plant matter such as dead wood and leaves.

== Subspecies ==
Glomeris hexasticha contains 27 distinct subspecies:

- Glomeris hexasticha bavarica Verhoeff, 1906
- Glomeris hexasticha boleti Verhoeff, 1906
- Glomeris hexasticha bosniensis Verhoeff, 1906
- Glomeris hexasticha calcivaga Verhoeff, 1906
- Glomeris hexasticha chiemensis Verhoeff, 1941
- Glomeris hexasticha eimeri Verhoeff, 1906
- Glomeris hexasticha hexasticha Verhoeff
- Glomeris hexasticha intermedia Latzel, 1884
- Glomeris hexasticha marcomannia Verhoeff, 1906
- Glomeris hexasticha quercivora Verhoeff, 1906
- Glomeris hexasticha rabensteinensis Verhoeff, 1906
- Glomeris hexasticha ruscorum Verhoeff, 1929
- Glomeris hexasticha suevica Verhoeff, 1911
- Glomeris hexasticha szeklerana Verhoeff, 1906
- Glomeris hexasticha theresiae Verhoeff, 1906
- Glomeris hexasticha trisulcata Rothenbühler, 1899
