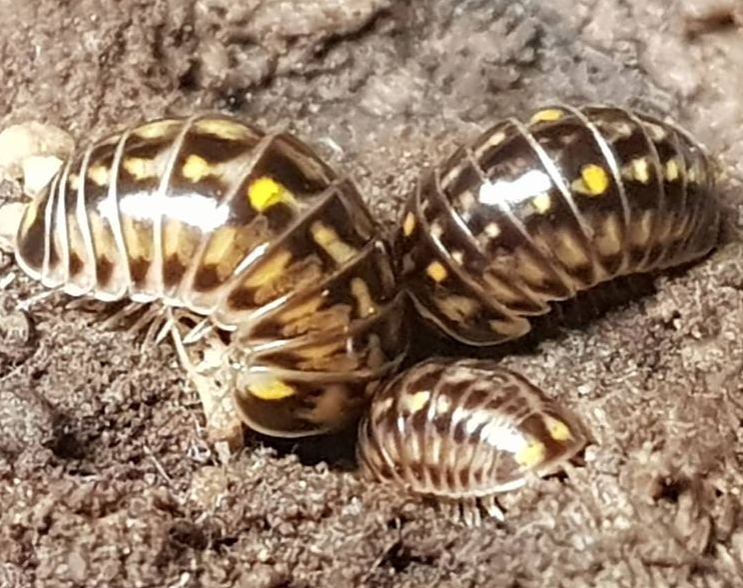

Scientific classification
- Kingdom: Animalia
- Phylum: Arthropoda
- Subphylum: Myriapoda
- Class: Diplopoda
- Order: Glomerida
- Family: Glomeridae
- Genus: Glomeris
- Species: G. ornata

Binomial name
- Glomeris ornata C.L.Koch, 1847

Synonyms
- List: Glomeris europaea ornata C. L. Koch, 1847; Glomeris malmivaga Verhoeff, 1912; Glomeris ornata malmivaga Verhoeff, 1912; Glomeris ornata var. malmivaga Verhoeff, 1912; Stenopleuromeris ornata C. L. Koch, 1847

= Glomeris ornata =

Species of millipede

Glomeris ornata, is a species of pill millipede within the genus Glomeris and family Glomeridae.

== Description ==
Glomeris ornata is a medium-sized pill-millipede, measuring between 7 and 12 mm in length. The head of G. ornata possesses 7 or 8 ocelli which are arranged in a 1 + 6 or 1 + 7 pattern. The colour pattern of G. ornata is variable. The general body colour is dark brown with light spots. The spots can vary in colour from beige, yellow or orange. The thoracic shield has one or two main striae, which are longitudinal ridges or grooves. Additionally, there are one or rarely two anterior striae and 2–5 posterior striae present on the thoracic shield. The anal shield of G. ornata has two spots that are elongated longitudinally and do not touch each other. Both male and females have an anal shield with a sclerotized spot, which is a characteristic only shared with one other species within the genus G. helvetica.

== Distribution and habitat ==
Glomeris ornata is a mostly Central European species, native to the countries of: Austria, Croatia, Hungary, Italy and Slovenia. G. ornata can be found living in humid valleys containing mixed species forests, rich in Acer, Carpinus, Fagus, Fraxinus and Picea trees. The species is frequently encountered in proximity to decaying wood and has a preference for calcareous soils. G. ornata can be found at elevations of 560 meters above sea level.
