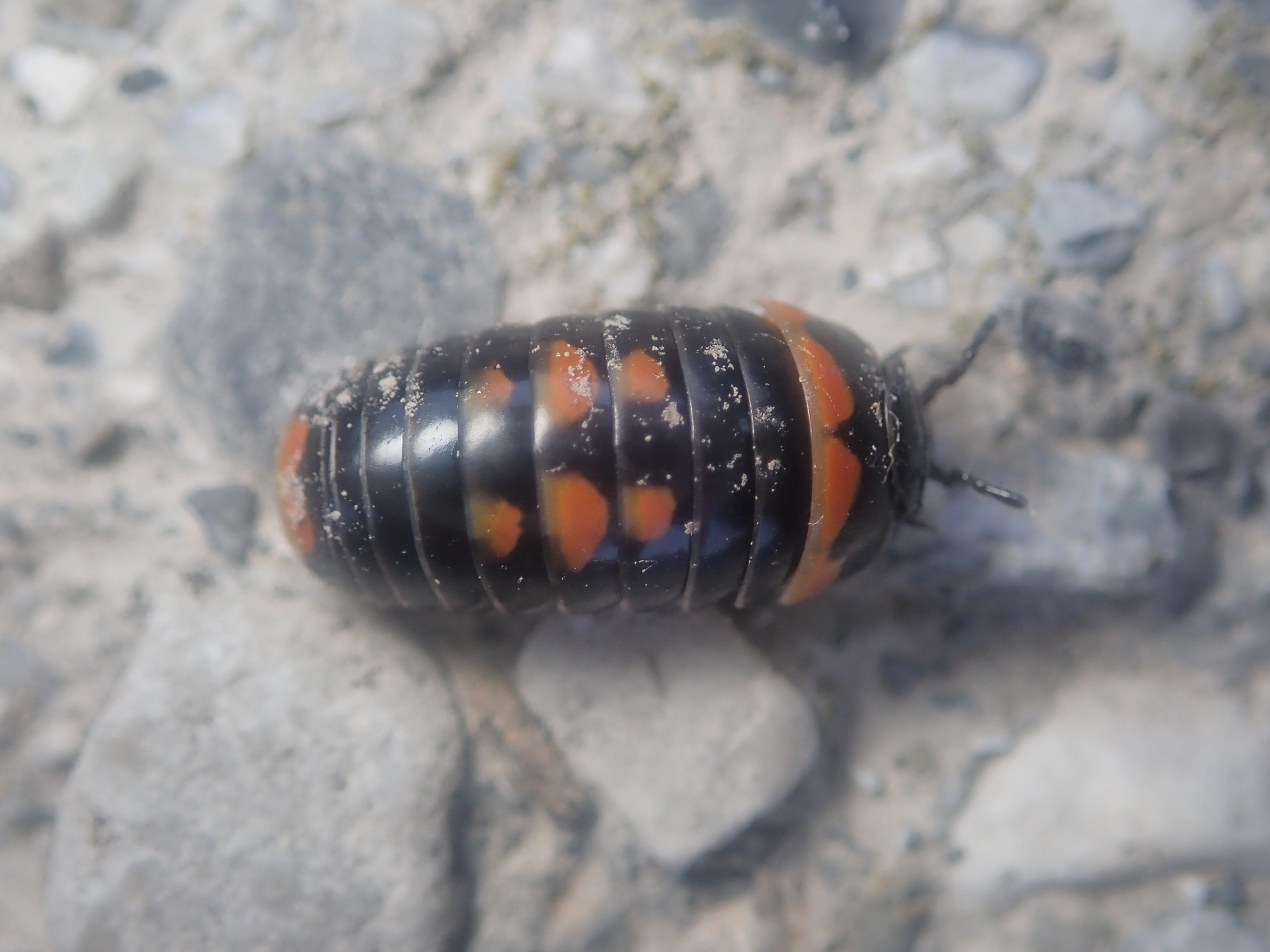

Scientific classification
- Kingdom: Animalia
- Phylum: Arthropoda
- Subphylum: Myriapoda
- Class: Diplopoda
- Order: Glomerida
- Family: Glomeridae
- Genus: Glomeris
- Species: G. pulchra

Binomial name
- Glomeris pulchra C. L. Koch, 1847

Synonyms
- List: Glomeris dalmatina AmStein, 1859; Glomeris hexasticha bavarica var. verhoeffi Attems, 1927; Glomeris kratochvili Lang, 1939; Glomeris pulchra kochi Attems, 1927; Glomeris pulchra pulchra var. conjuncta Attems, 1927; Glomeris pulchra pulchra var. discreta Attems, 1927; Glomeris pulchra pulchra var. giselae Attems, 1927; Glomeris pulchra pulchra var. hercegovinensis Attems, 1927; Glomeris pulchra pulchra var. kochi Attems, 1927; Glomeris pulchra pulchra var. kochii Attems, 1927; Glomeris pulchra pulchra var. lapadina Attems, 1927; Glomeris pulchra pulchra var. maura Attems, 1927; Glomeris pulchra pulchra var. monosticha Attems, 1927; Glomeris pulchra pulchra var. obscurata Attems, 1927; Glomeris pulchra pulchra var. photopyga Attems, 1927; Glomeris pulchra pulchra var. pulchra C. L. Koch, 1847; Glomeris pulchra pulchra var. slavophila Attems, 1927; Glomeris pulchra pulchra var. verhoeffi Attems, 1927; Glomeris pulchra pulchra var. wohlberedti Verhoeff, 1909; Glomeris pulchra var. wohlberedti Verhoeff, 1909; Glomeris sicula de Haan sec. Brandt, 1841; Glomeris sinuata Kollar sec. Brandt, 1841; Stenopleuromeris pulchra (Koch, C. L., 1847)

= Glomeris pulchra =

Species of pill millipede

Glomeris pulchra is a species of pill millipede within the genus Glomeris and the family Glomeridae. The species is native to South-eastern Europe, where it can be found in the countries of: Albania, Bosnia and Herzegovina, Croatia, Italy, Montenegro and North Macedonia.

== Subspecies ==
The following subspecies are recognised:

- Glomeris pulchra bukkariensis Verhoeff, 1924
- Glomeris pulchra garganensis Verhoeff, 1932
- Glomeris pulchra hispanica C. L. Koch, 1847
- Glomeris pulchra pulchra C. L. Koch, 1847
- Glomeris pulchra quarnerona Attems
