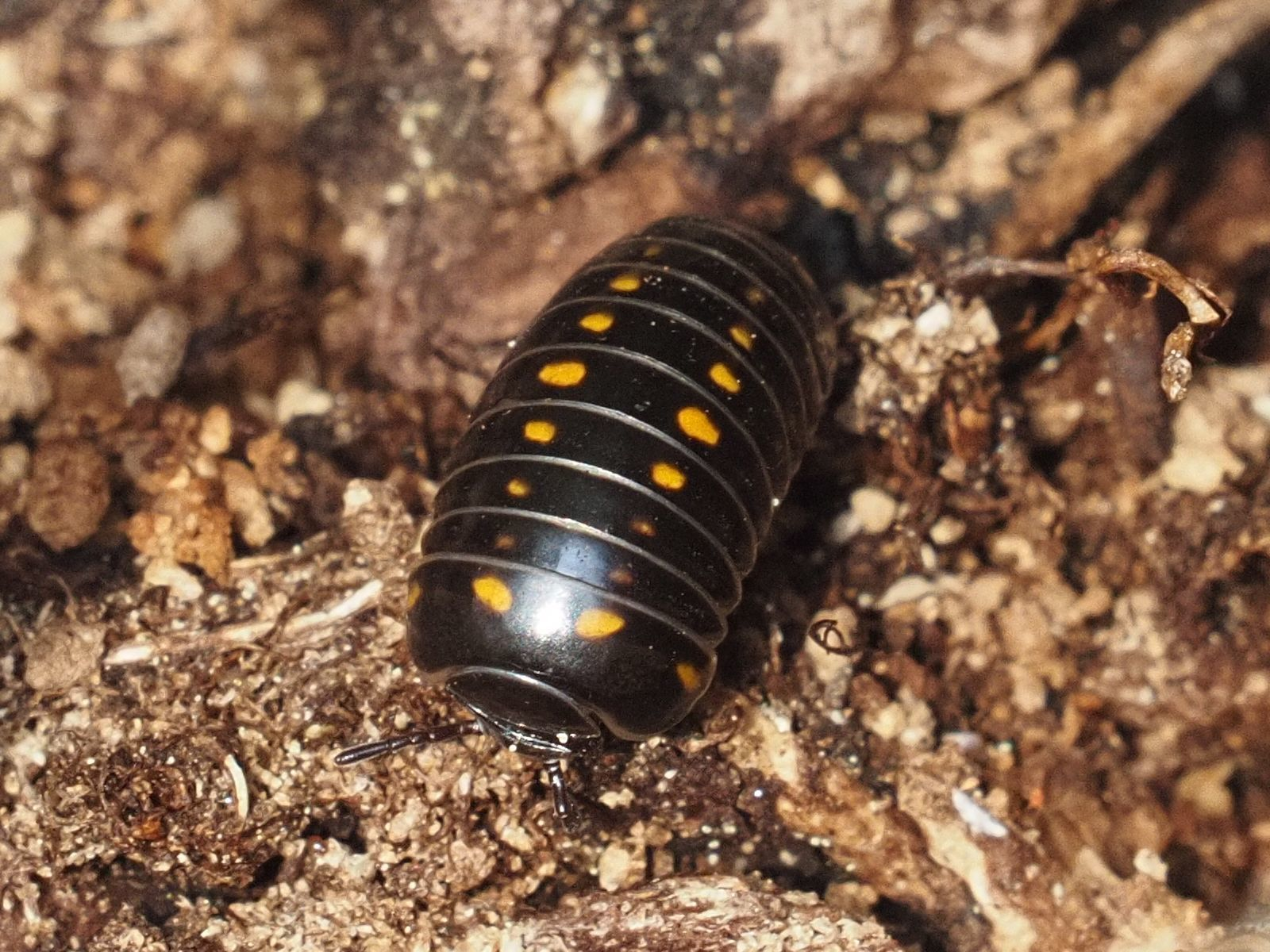

Scientific classification
- Kingdom: Animalia
- Phylum: Arthropoda
- Subphylum: Myriapoda
- Class: Diplopoda
- Order: Glomerida
- Family: Glomeridae
- Genus: Glomeris
- Species: G. pustulata

Binomial name
- Glomeris pustulata (Fabricius, 1781)

= Glomeris pustulata =

Species of pill millipede

Glomeris pustulata is a species of pill millipede belonging to the genus Glomeris and the family Glomeridae.

== Distribution ==
Glomeris pustulata possesses a central European distribution and has been recorded within the countries of Poland Germany and Switzerland. Within Poland the species has been found living within Ojców National Park, while in Germany the species has been recorded in North Rhine-Westphalia and Baden-Württemberg. In Switzerland the species has been recorded within the Jura Mountains.

== Habitat ==
Glomeris pustulata is a species that thrives in well-preserved deciduous and mixed forests abundant with decaying wood. Specifically, it can be found within mature Quercus and Fagus forests, inhabiting crevices beneath the bark of deceased trees, as well as within the leaf litter and moss surrounding the decaying wood. The species has a preference for high calcium carbonate soils provided by shell limestone areas.
