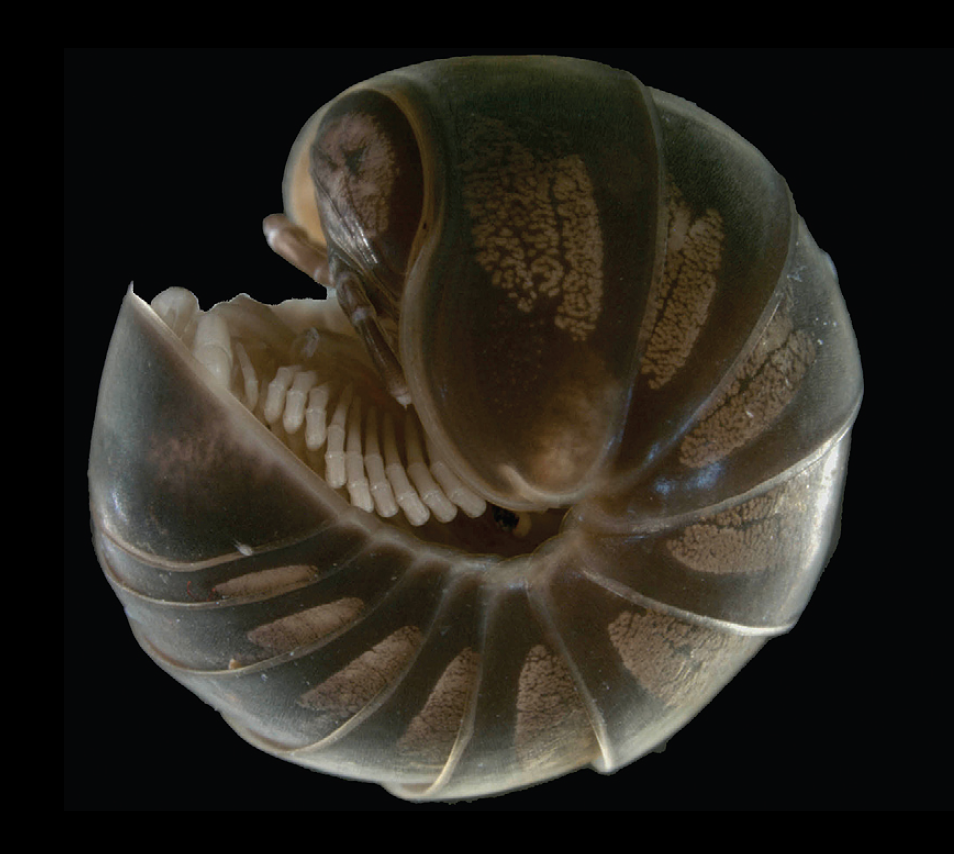

Scientific classification
- Kingdom: Animalia
- Phylum: Arthropoda
- Subphylum: Myriapoda
- Class: Diplopoda
- Order: Glomerida
- Family: Glomeridae
- Genus: Glomeris
- Species: G. sublimbata

Binomial name
- Glomeris sublimbata Lucas, 1846
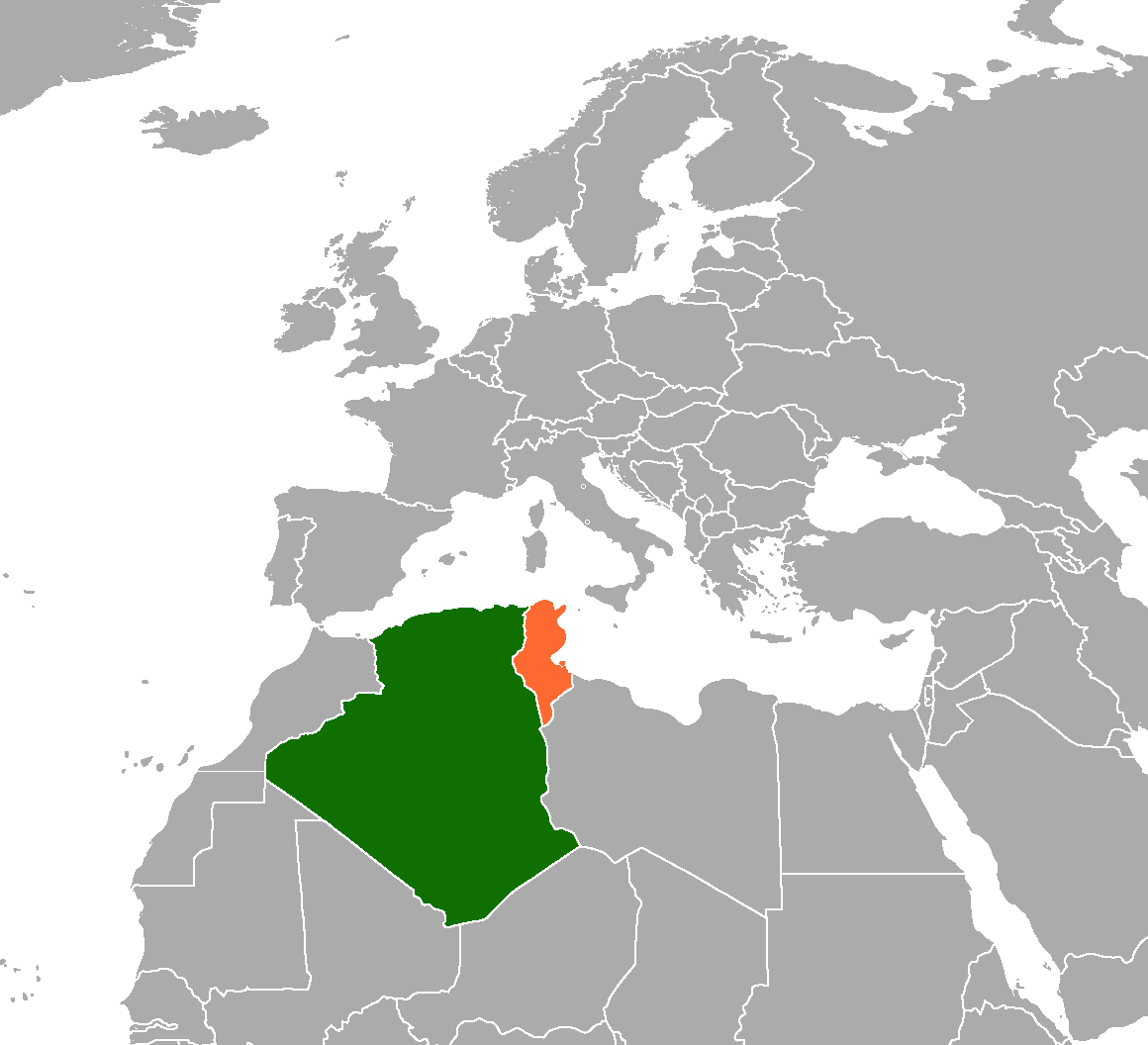
- Glomeris sublimbata is native to Algeria and Tunisia.

= Glomeris sublimbata =

Species of pill millipede

Glomeris sublimbata, also known as the marbled pill millipede, is a species of pill millipede belonging to the genus Glomeris and the family Glomeridae.

== Description ==
Glomeris sublimbata is a large arthropod with a body length reaching up to 20 mm and a width of approximately 10 mm. Individuals are grey and brown in colour possessing a marbled pattern. The specific range of terga segments where these lateral spots appear may vary among individuals. The marbled lateral spots can be observed on the terga starting from the second or third segment and continuing up to either the eleventh or twelfth segment, depending on the individual. Male individual's legs numbered 17, 18, and 19 possess distinct and well-defined telopods. Much like G. klugii, there is a potential for intraspecific variation in the degree of development between the anterior and posterior parts of the third tergum, therefore individuals may exhibit different levels of growth or characteristics within the same species. When G. sublimbata is preserved within alcohol over long periods of time the individual markings and colouration of specimens can completely fade, with fresher specimens more likely to retain their coloration.

== Distribution and habitat ==
Glomeris sublimbata is native to the North African countries of Algeria and Tunisia. The two countries share a border, which means they have a direct land boundary that connects them. This border between them enhances their geographical proximity. Both Tunisia and Algeria share a Mediterranean climate, characterized by hot, dry summers and mild, wet winters. The species has been recorded at altitudes ranging from 150 to 690 meters above sea level.

Glomeris sublimbata exhibits a preference for diverse forest habitats within its range. It has been observed in mixed oak forests dominated by Quercus faginea and Quercus suber. It can also be found inhabiting humid Pinus forests or mixed species forest habitats containing Eucalyptus, Quercus', Erica and Pinus species. G. sublimbata can be found living under stones, logs, and within leaf litter on the forest floor. Its presence in forests consisting of varied tree species suggests a certain level of ecological flexibility.
