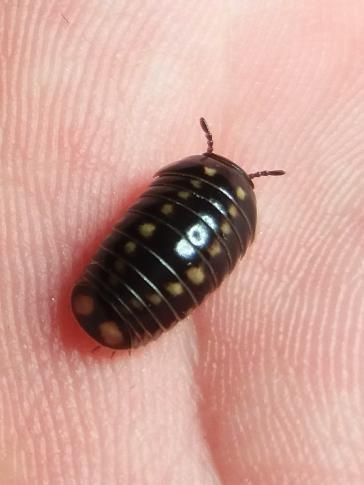

Scientific classification
- Kingdom: Animalia
- Phylum: Arthropoda
- Subphylum: Myriapoda
- Class: Diplopoda
- Order: Glomerida
- Family: Glomeridae
- Genus: Glomeris
- Species: G. tetrasticha

Binomial name
- Glomeris tetrasticha Brandt, 1833

Synonyms
- List: Glomeris carpathica Latzel, 1882; Glomeris connexa fagivora var. fagivora Verhoeff, 1906; Glomeris connexa var. abieticola Verhoeff, 1906; Glomeris connexa var. atrata Haase, 1886; Glomeris connexa var. carpathica Latzel, 1882; Glomeris connexa var. corylicomes Verhoeff, 1906; Glomeris connexa var. fagivora Verhoeff, 1906; Glomeris connexa var. odini Verhoeff, 1937; Glomeris connexa var. tenebrosa Latzel, 1884; Glomeris connexa var. tetrasticha (Brandt, 1833); Glomeris connexa var. thuringiaca Verhoeff, 1906

= Glomeris tetrasticha =

Species of pill millipede

Glomeris tetrasticha, is a species of pill millipede within the genus Glomeris and family Glomeridae.

== Description ==
The body length of Glomeris tetrasticha is 5–17 mm. The dorsal plates of the species are black or dark brown in colour, possessing yellow spots. The dorsal shield is evenly rounded from the side. G. tetrasticha possesses a thin cuticle that is highly permeable to water.

== Distribution and habitat ==
Glomeris tetrasticha possesses a widespread European distribution, where it can be found within the countries of: Austria, Belarus, Belgium, Czech Republic, France, Germany, Hungary, Italy, Poland, Romania, Slovakia, Switzerland and Ukraine. The species can also be found within European Russia.

Glomeris tetrasticha can be found in a broad range of forest and woodland habitats, including floodplain forests. The peak activity of Glomeris tetrasticha occurs at around 2300 hours, indicating a preference for nocturnal activities. This temporal pattern, with the species being primarily active between 2100 and 0900 hours, aligns with their behaviour of searching for food during the night and seeking shelter in the morning.
