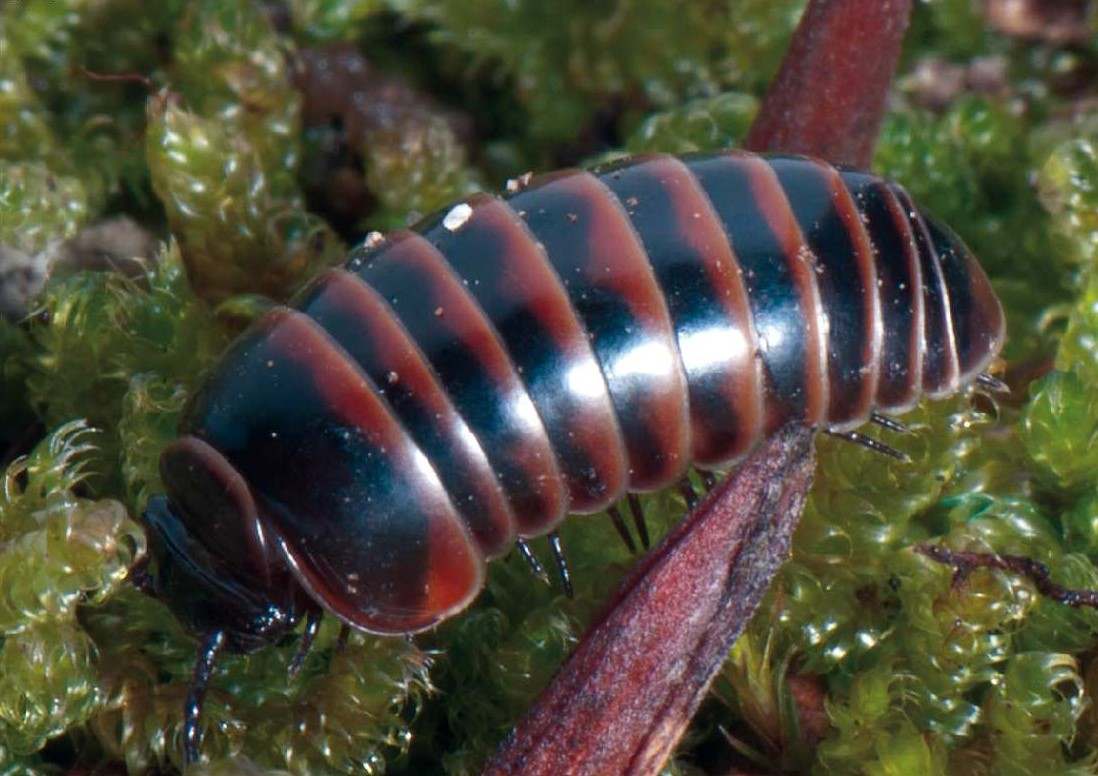

Scientific classification
- Kingdom: Animalia
- Phylum: Arthropoda
- Subphylum: Myriapoda
- Class: Diplopoda
- Order: Glomerida
- Family: Glomeridae
- Genus: Glomeris
- Species: G. transalpina

Binomial name
- Glomeris transalpina C. L. Koch, 1836

Synonyms
- List: Glomeris alpina Am Stein, 1855; Glomeris annulata transalpina C. L. Koch, 1836; Glomeris europaea striata var. transalpina (C. L. Koch, 1836); Glomeris transalpina var. didierensis Verhoeff, 1932; Glomeris transalpina var. transalpina C. L. Koch, 1836; Glomeris transalpina var. varallensis Verhoeff, 1936

= Glomeris transalpina =

Species of pill millipede

Glomeris transalpina, is a species of pill millipede within the genus Glomeris and family Glomeridae.

== Distribution and habitat ==
Glomeris transalpina is native to Europe, where it can be found within the countries of Austria, France, Germany, Italy and Switzerland. G. transalpina is a high-altitude species, inhabiting alpine habitats within the Alps mountain range.
