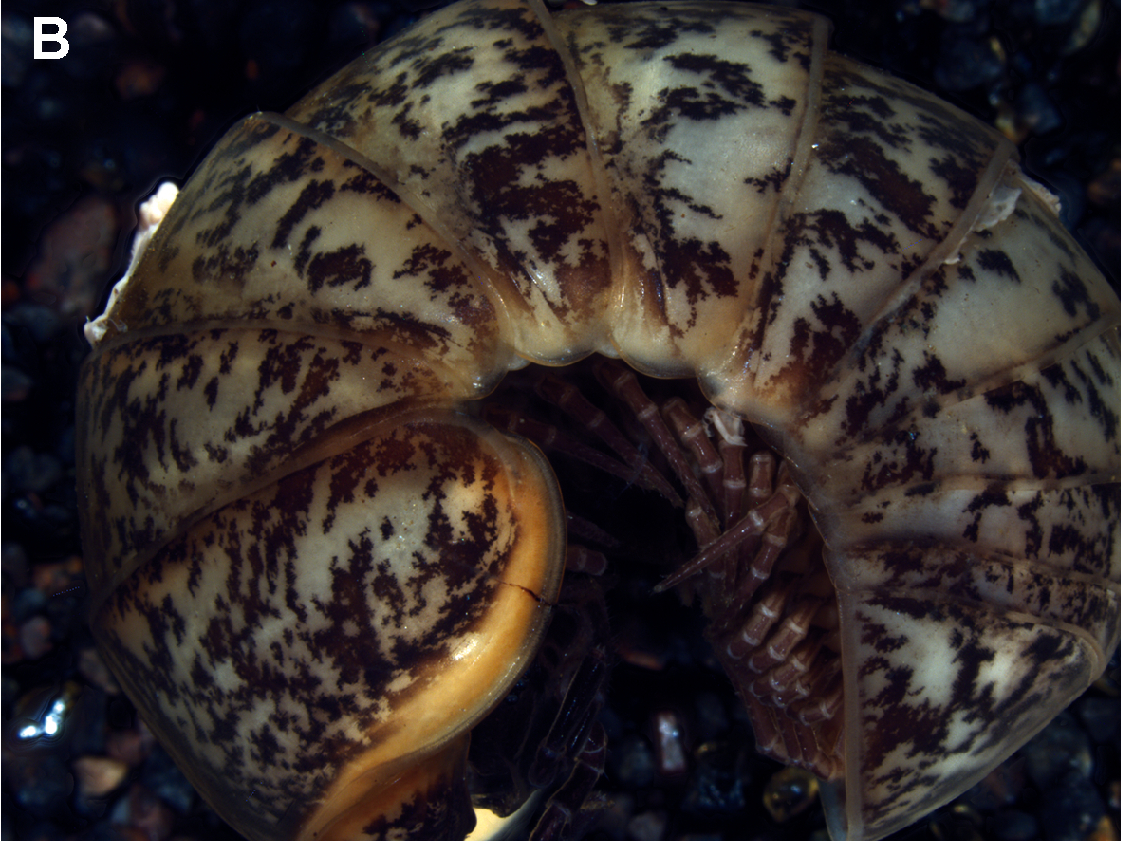

Scientific classification
- Kingdom: Animalia
- Phylum: Arthropoda
- Subphylum: Myriapoda
- Class: Diplopoda
- Order: Glomerida
- Family: Glomeridae
- Genus: Glomeris
- Species: G. primordialis

Binomial name
- Glomeris primordialis Verhoeff, 1930
- Glomeris primordialis is endemic to the region of Piedmont, Northern Italy.

Synonyms
- List: Glomeris primoridialis Verhoeff, 1930

= Glomeris primordialis =

Species of millipede

Glomeris primordialis, is a species of pill millipede within the genus Glomeris and family Glomeridae. The species is locally endemic to the Biellese Alps of Northern Italy.

== Distribution and habitat ==
Glomeris primordialis is endemic to the Biellese Alps of Northern Italy, where it can be found in the region of Piemonte, in the communes of Pollone and Favaro Veneto. G. primordialis has only ever been recorded on two sites North of Biella. The species inhabits elevated habitat and has been found at elevations over 620 meters above sea level. Habitat includes a valley, which contains a forest consisting of a variety of tree species such as Acer, Castanea and Fraxinus.
