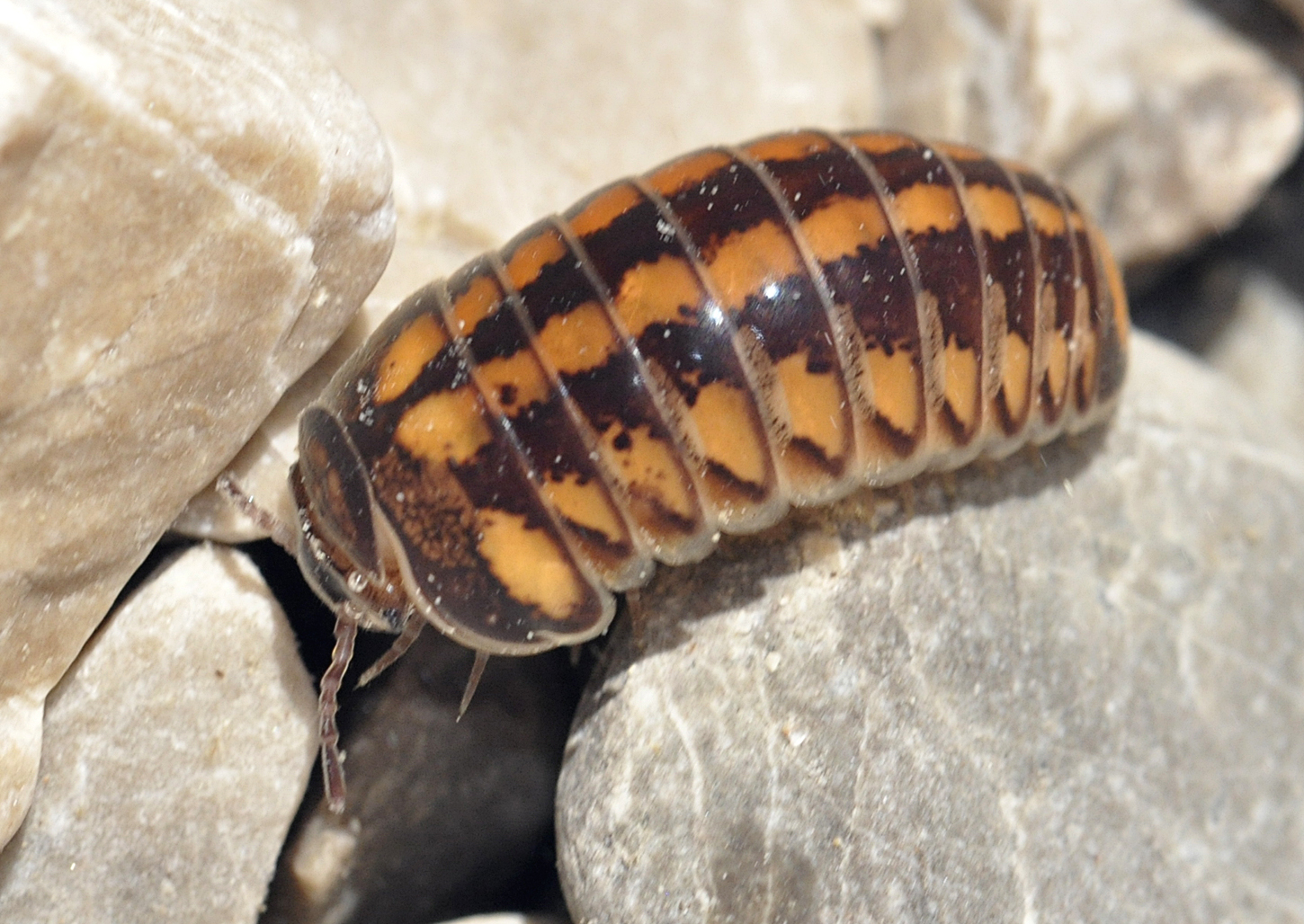

Scientific classification
- Kingdom: Animalia
- Phylum: Arthropoda
- Subphylum: Myriapoda
- Class: Diplopoda
- Order: Glomerida
- Family: Glomeridae
- Genus: Glomeris
- Species: G. connexa

Binomial name
- Glomeris connexa C. L. Koch, 1847

Synonyms
- List: Glomeris albocincta C.L. Koch, 1847; Glomeris fagivora Verhoeff, 1906; Glomeris humbertiana Saussure, 1893; Glomeris verhoeffi Brölemann, 1924

= Glomeris connexa =

Species of millipede

Glomeris connexa is a species of pill millipede within the genus Glomeris and family Glomeridae.

== Description ==
Glomeris connexa is a species of pill millipede which can reach a length of 7–15 millimetres (0.28–0.59 in) in females and 8–20 millimetres (0.31–0.79 in) in males. Colour of specimens can vary from a shiny brown to greyish black. Although lighter coloured specimens are far more common, darker colour forms sometimes appear.

== Distribution and habitat ==
Glomeris connexa is native to Europe, where it can be found from the Southern Alps to the Apennine Mountains. The species has been recorded to live in the following European countries: Austria, Czech Republic, France, Germany, Italy, Poland, Switzerland and Ukraine. The species has also been recorded to live in central European Russia.

Glomeris connexa inhabits forest habitats, where it is a dominant millipede species in many types of forest including Old-growth forest. Glomeris connexa thrives in poor soils and average humidity forests. The species can often be found alongside Polydesmus complanatus, however both populations decrease in forests which possess fertile soils and high humidity.

== Subspecies ==
The following subspecies are recognised:

- Glomeris connexa alpina Latzel, 1884
- Glomeris connexa carpathica Latzel, 1882
- Glomeris connexa connexa Latzel
- Glomeris connexa distichella Berlese
- Glomeris connexa paucistriata Silvestri, 1894
- Glomeris connexa scutolimbata Verhoeff, 1906
