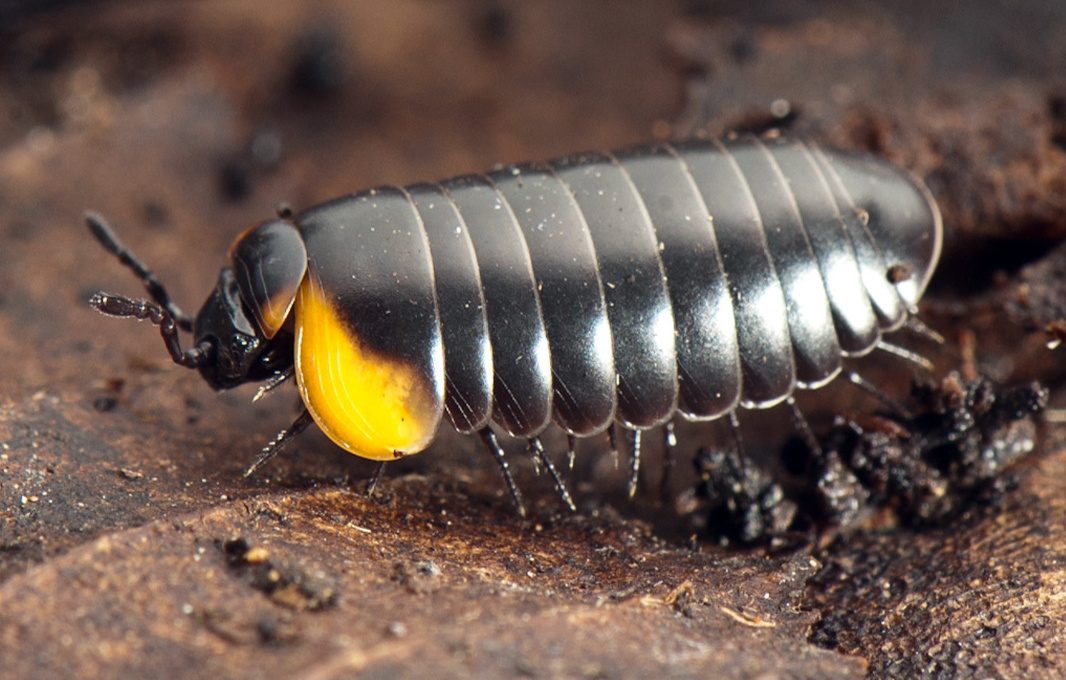
- Yellow morph
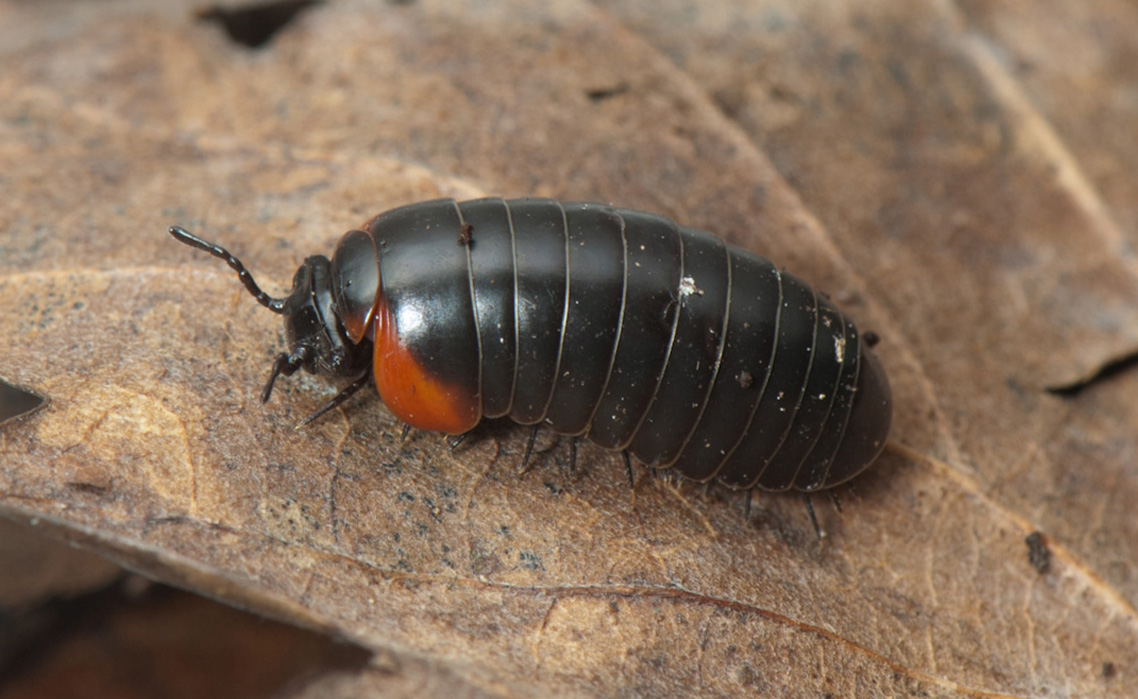
- Orange morph

Scientific classification
- Domain: Eukaryota
- Kingdom: Animalia
- Phylum: Arthropoda
- Subphylum: Myriapoda
- Class: Diplopoda
- Order: Glomerida
- Family: Glomeridae
- Genus: Glomeris
- Species: G. aurita

Binomial name
- Glomeris aurita C. L. Koch, 1847

= Glomeris aurita =

Species of millipede

Glomeris aurita, also known as the golden-eared pill millipede, is a species of pill millipede belonging to the genus Glomeris and the family Glomeridae.

== Description ==
Glomeris aurita exhibits polymorphism and individuals can be found together in two different colour morphs, either expressing a yellow or orange colouration on their thoracic shield. The rest of G. aurita's body, regardless of the morph, is black in colour. Glomeris aurita also possesses a prominent stria on its main thoracic shield, which is a feature not shared by other pill millipedes within its natural range.

== Distribution and ecology ==
Glomeris aurita is a microendemic species, native only to the Bergamasque Alps of Northern Italy. G. aurita is a high-altitude species, found inhabiting alpine meadows at altitudes ranging from 1400 to 2400 meters above sea level. The alpine meadow habitat is notable as it is an unusual habitat for pill millipedes, which usually inhabit forest habitats.

It is believed that the active period of Glomeris aurita on the surface, extends from June to the middle of September, encompassing only 3.5 out of 12 months of the year. It is also believed the species may inhabit the cool sheltered environments of mountain caves. G. aurita had previously been listed as a species encountered within caves east of Lago di Como by Manfredi (1932). Nevertheless, specimens of G. aurita from alpine meadow habitat in the Bergamasque Alps do not exhibit any indications of adaptations associated with cave environments.
