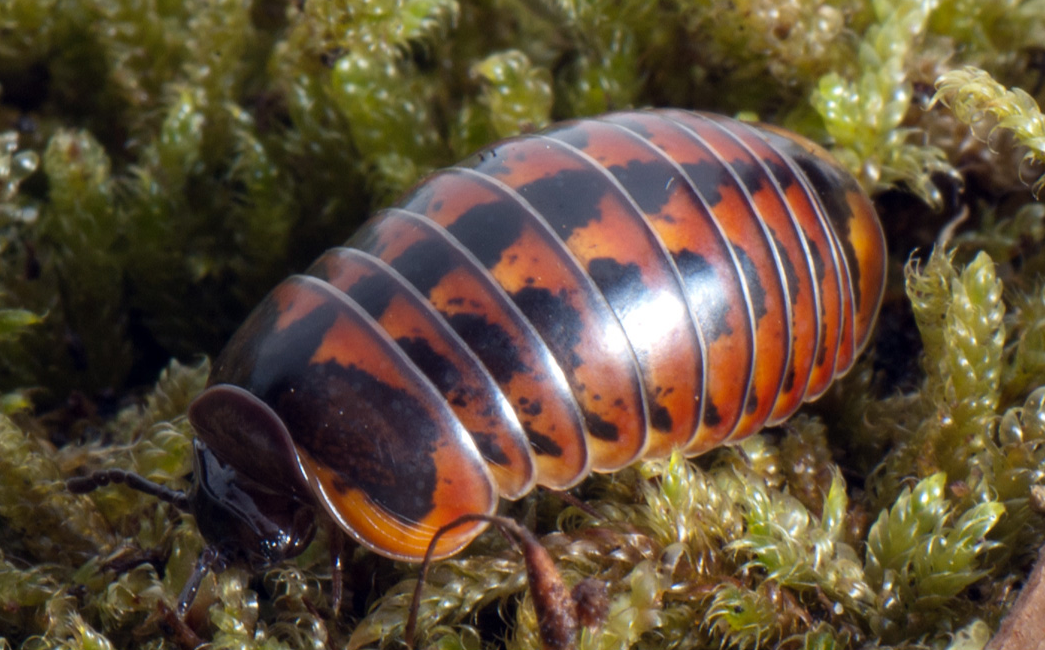

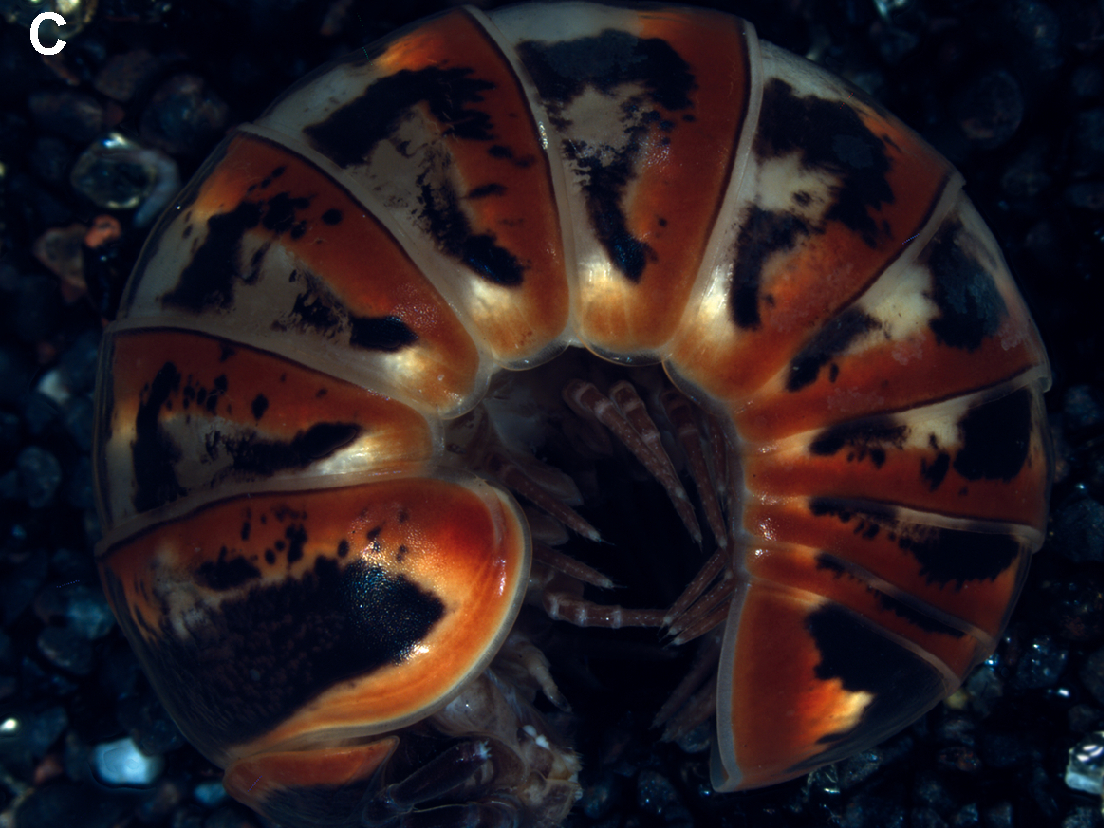

Scientific classification
- Domain: Eukaryota
- Kingdom: Animalia
- Phylum: Arthropoda
- Subphylum: Myriapoda
- Class: Diplopoda
- Order: Glomerida
- Family: Glomeridae
- Genus: Glomeris
- Species: G. oblongoguttata

Binomial name
- Glomeris oblongoguttata Verhoeff, 1894
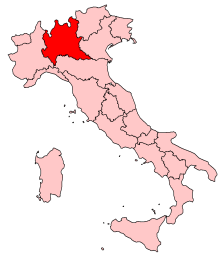
- Glomeris oblongoguttata is endemic to the Lombardy region of Northern Italy.

= Glomeris oblongoguttata =

Species of millipede

Glomeris oblongoguttata, also known as the painted lady pill millipede, is a species of pill millipede belonging to the genus Glomeris and the family Glomeridae.

== Distribution ==
The species is endemic to Northern Italy, where it can be found in Pisogne on the northern-east tip of Lake Iseo as well as Oltre il Colle in the province of Bergamo. Due to being an endemic species G. oblongoguttata can be found nowhere else in the world outside of Northern Italy.

== Etymology ==
The genus name Glomeris is a genitive form of the noun "glomus", which means "ball", in reference to the pill millipedes ability to roll into a ball when disturbed. The species name oblongoguttata, however is a combination of two words: "oblongus", meaning "oblong" or "elongated", and "guttata", meaning "spotted" or "stained" in reference to their oblong shape and colour stained appearance.
