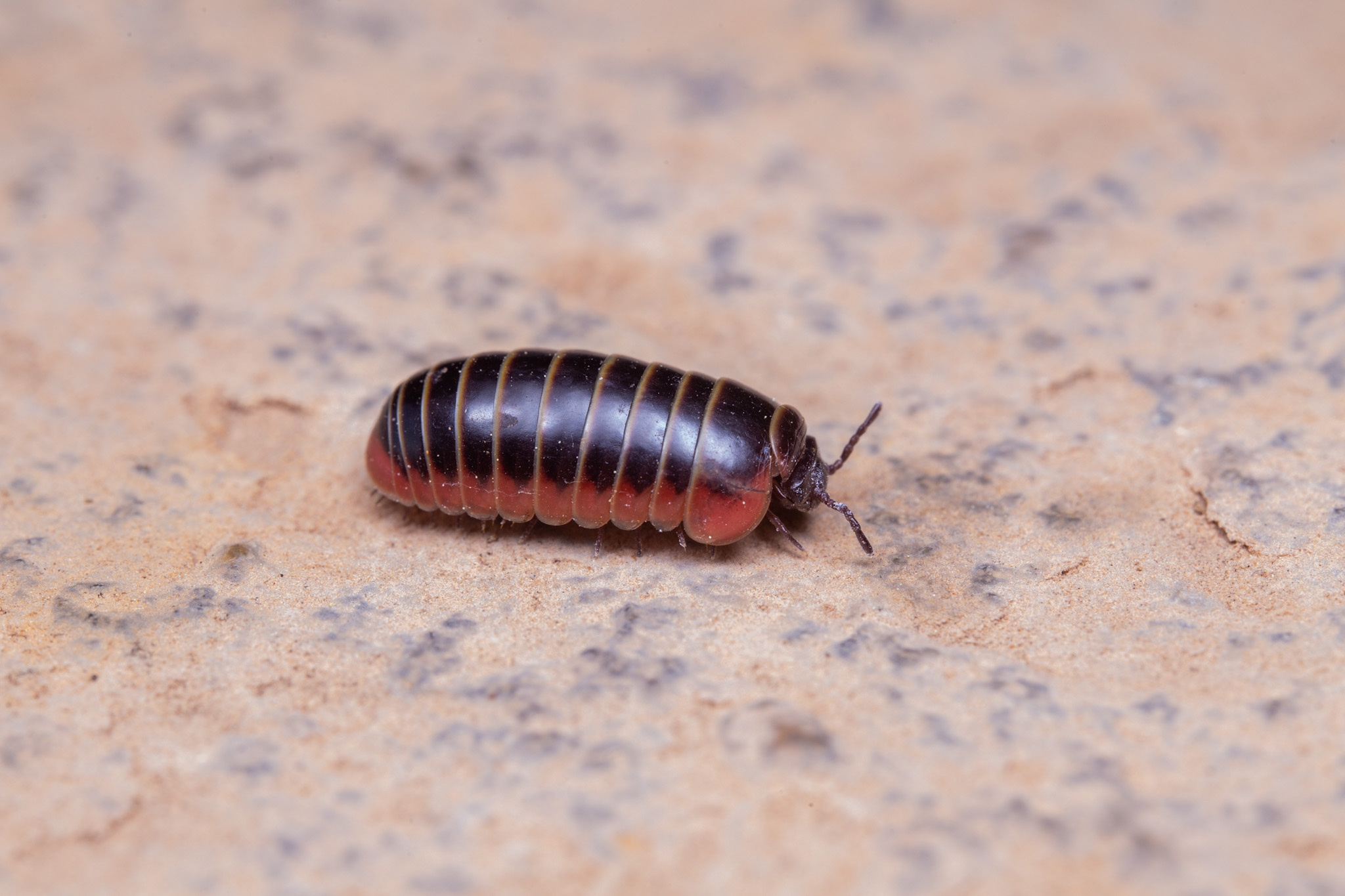

Scientific classification
- Kingdom: Animalia
- Phylum: Arthropoda
- Subphylum: Myriapoda
- Class: Diplopoda
- Order: Glomerida
- Family: Glomeridae
- Genus: Glomeris
- Species: G. balcanica

Binomial name
- Glomeris balcanica Verhoeff, 1906

Synonyms
- List: Glomeris balcanica latemarginata Attems, 1927; Glomeris bureschi Verhoeff, 1926; Glomeris bureschi latemarginata Attems; Glomeris bureschi var. olympiaca Verhoeff, 1926; Glomeris bureschi var. sakarensis Verhoeff, 1926; Glomeris hahni Lang, 1935; Glomeris latemarginata Attems, 1927; Glomeris rhodopina Verhoeff, 1937; Glomeris rhodopina kaloferensis Verhoeff, 1937

= Glomeris balcanica =

Species of pill millipede

Glomeris balcanica, also known as the Balkan pill millipede, is a species of pill millipede within the family Glomeridae and order Glomerida.

== Distribution and habitat ==
Glomeris balcanica possesses a limited range within South-eastern Europe, where the species can be found in Bulgaria, Italy, North Macedonia and European Turkey. G. balcanica lives in Mediterranean climates where it inhabits the leaf litter of Quercus coccifera forests.
