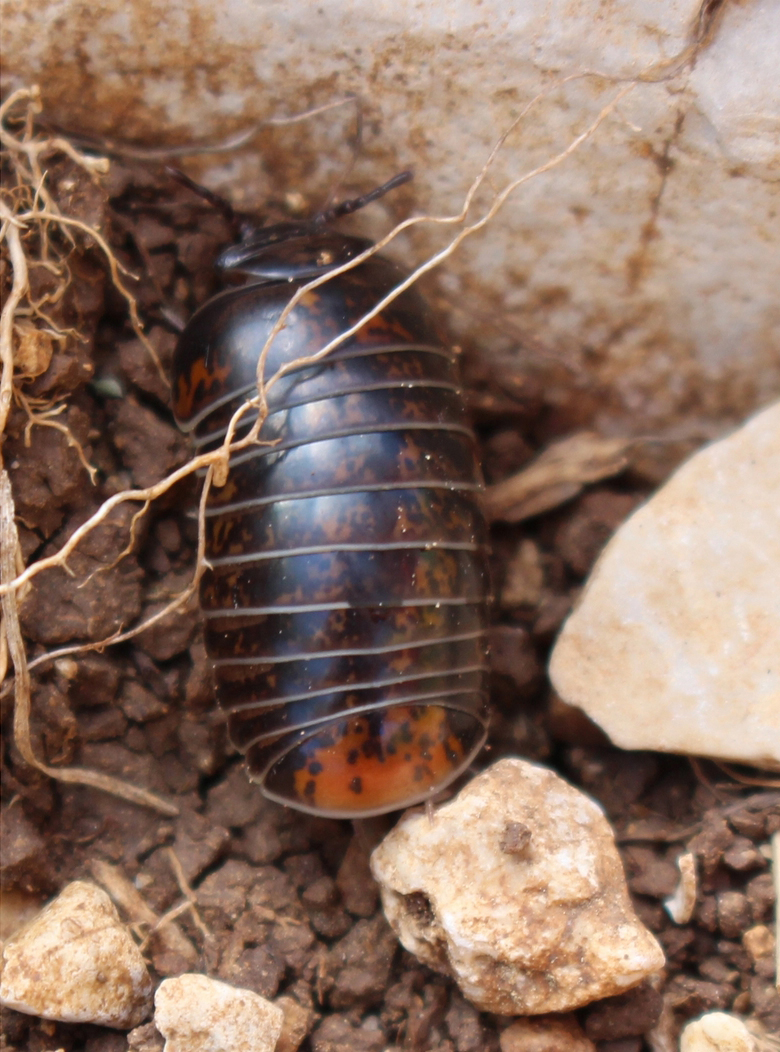

Scientific classification
- Kingdom: Animalia
- Phylum: Arthropoda
- Subphylum: Myriapoda
- Class: Diplopoda
- Order: Glomerida
- Family: Glomeridae
- Genus: Glomeris
- Species: G. ligurica

Binomial name
- Glomeris ligurica Latzel, 1886

Synonyms
- List: Glomeris connexa var. ligurica Latzel, 1886; Glomeris ligurica ligurica Latzel, 1886; Glomeris ligurica ligurica var. epimorphotica Verhoeff, 1911

= Glomeris ligurica =

Species of pill millipede

Glomeris ligurica is a species of pill millipede within the genus Glomeris and family Glomeridae.

== Distribution and habitat ==
Glomeris ligurica is native to Europe, where it can be found within the countries of France and Italy. G. ligurica occurs within mountainous habitat consisting of valleys, rubble and rocks, where it can be found within leaf litter and under stones. The species has been recorded to inhabit elevated terrain at altitudes of 811 meters above sea level. G. ligurica has been encountered alongside plant genera such as Quercus, Olea, Rubus and Hedera.

== Subspecies ==
The following subspecies are recognised:

- Glomeris ligurica genuina Latzel, 1886
- Glomeris ligurica levantina Verhoeff, 1909
