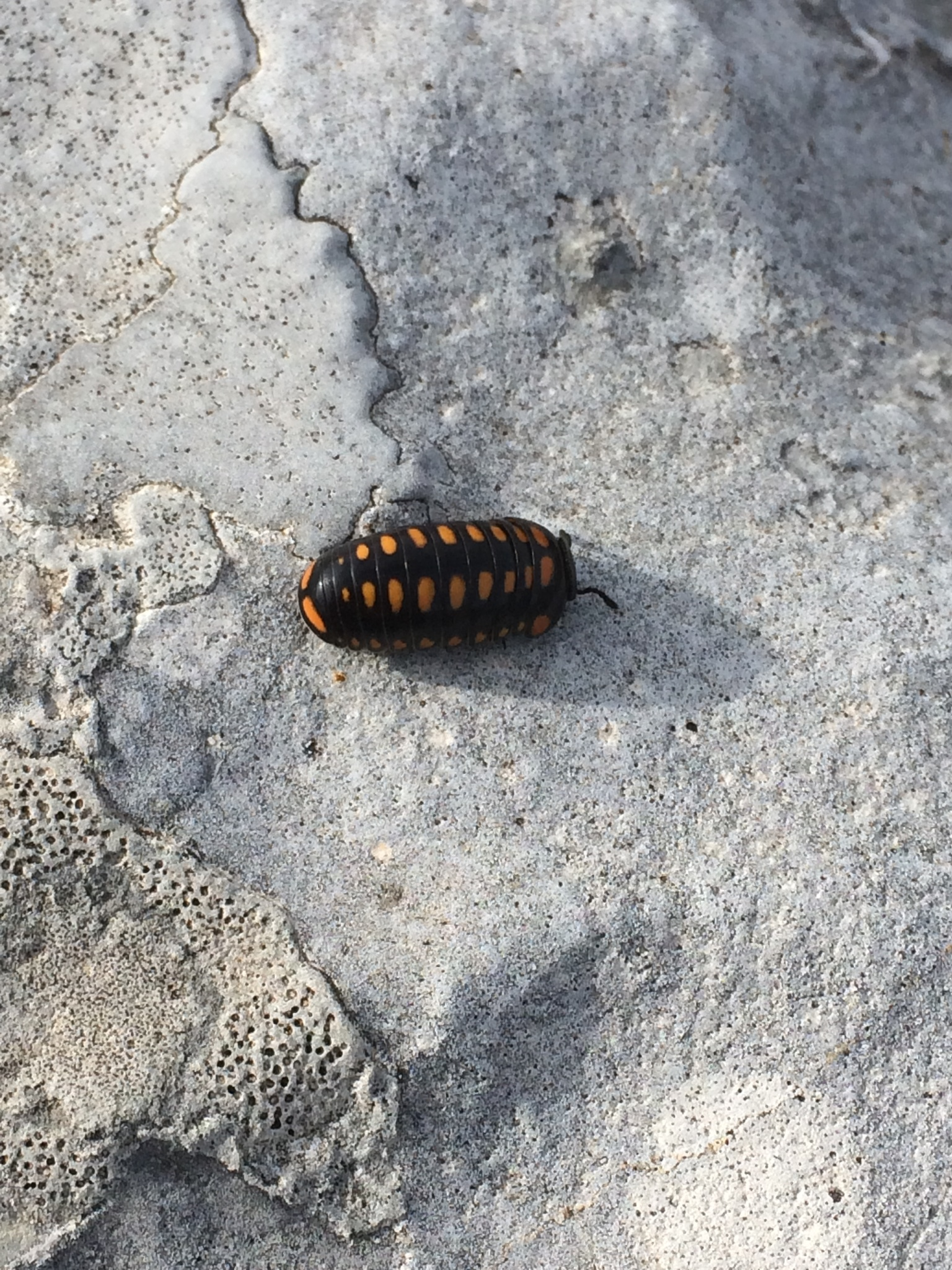

Scientific classification
- Kingdom: Animalia
- Phylum: Arthropoda
- Subphylum: Myriapoda
- Class: Diplopoda
- Order: Glomerida
- Family: Glomeridae
- Genus: Glomeris
- Species: G. guttata

Binomial name
- Glomeris guttata Risso, 1826

Synonyms
- List: Eurypleuroglomeris guttata (Risso, 1826); Glomeris connexa var. guttata Risso, 1826; Glomeris europaea guttata Risso, 1826; Glomeris guttata guttata Risso, 1826; Glomeris saussurei Verhoeff, 1911

= Glomeris guttata =

Species of pill millipede

Glomeris guttata is a species of pill millipede within the genus Glomeris and family Glomeridae.

== Description ==
The dorsal plates of Glomeris guttata are brown to black, possessing four rows of orange or reddish-orange spots. The head of G. guttata lacks spots and is brown to black in colour. Glomeris guttata expresses Müllerian mimicry, sharing a colour pattern with the caterpillar of the apollo butterfly (Parnassius apollo) of which they share a habitat.

== Distribution and habitat ==
Glomeris guttata is native to Southwest Europe, where it can be found within the countries of France, Italy and Monaco. The species can be found living within alpine habitats such as the Var basin in Southern France.
