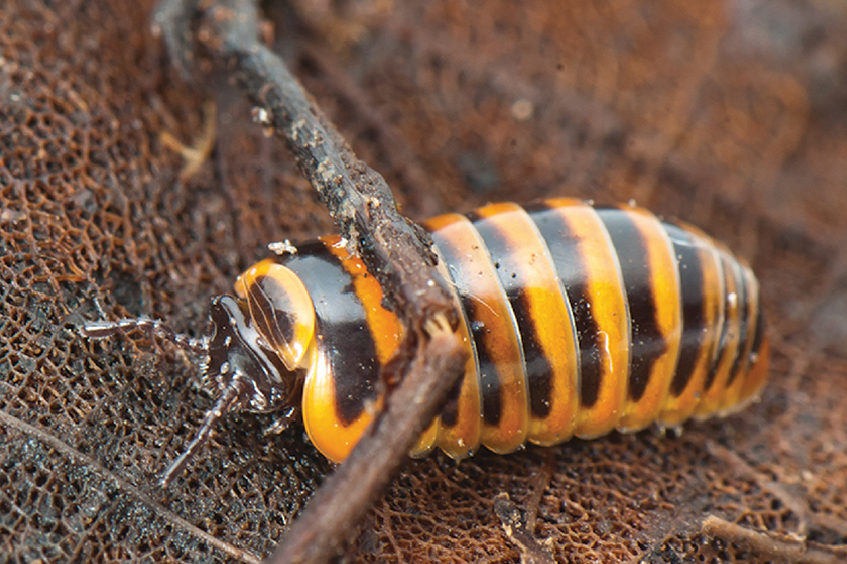

Scientific classification
- Kingdom: Animalia
- Phylum: Arthropoda
- Subphylum: Myriapoda
- Class: Diplopoda
- Order: Glomerida
- Family: Glomeridae
- Genus: Glomeris
- Species: G. annulata

Binomial name
- Glomeris annulata Brandt, 1833

Synonyms
- List: Glomeris annullata Brandt, 1833; Glomeris europaea annulata Brandt, 1833

= Glomeris annulata =

Species of millipede

Glomeris annulata, also known as the orange banded pill millipede, is a species of pill millipede within the genus Glomeris and family Glomeridae.

== Description ==
The dorsal plates of Glomeris annulata are black in colour, however the posterior edges of each segment possesses orange bands.

== Distribution and habitat ==
Glomeris annulata is an endemic species, native only to Southern France. The species has been discovered inhabiting forest habitats at altitudes ranging from 280 to 300 meters above sea level.
