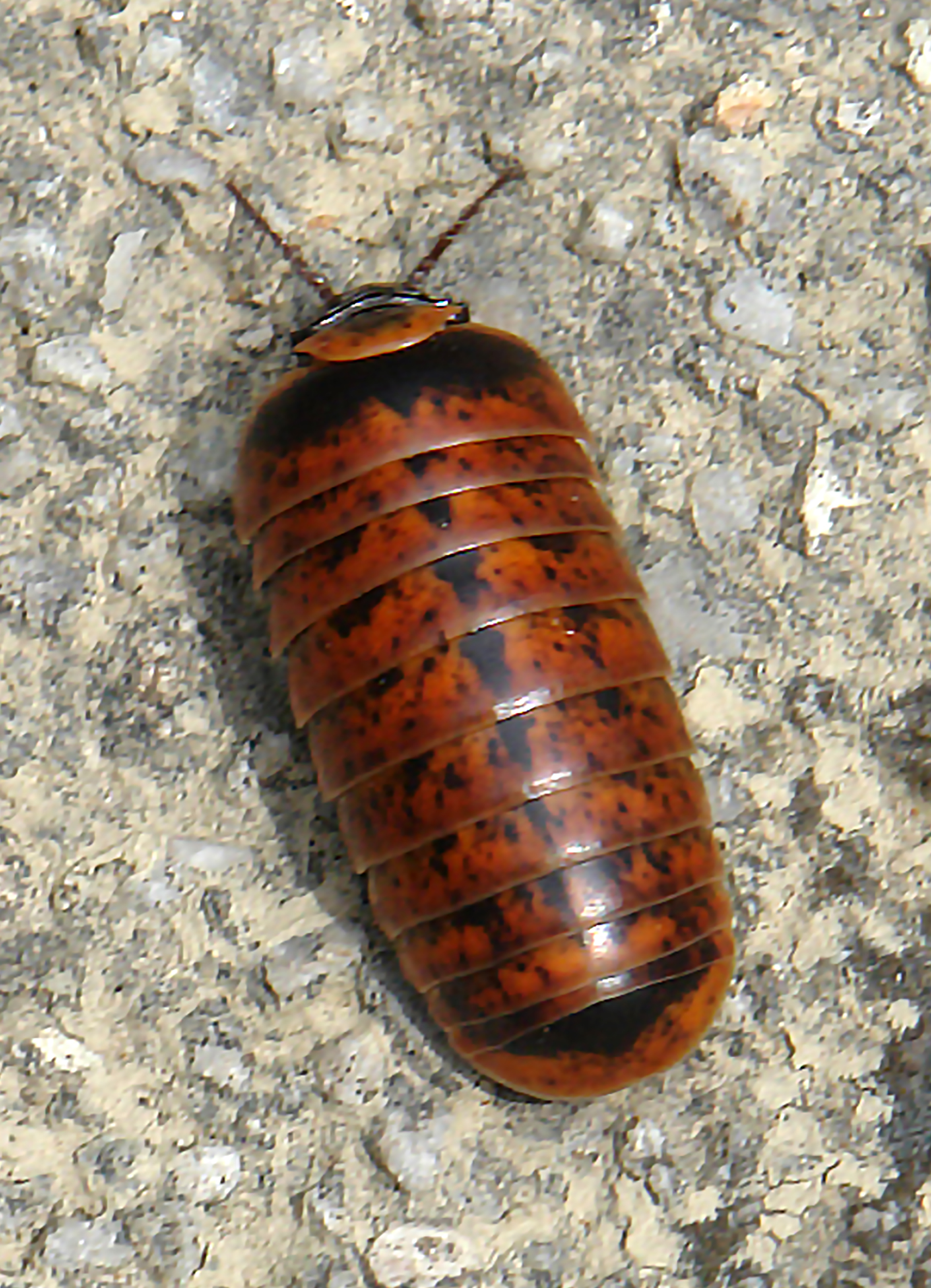
- Glomeris klugii morph conspersa

Scientific classification
- Kingdom: Animalia
- Phylum: Arthropoda
- Subphylum: Myriapoda
- Class: Diplopoda
- Order: Glomerida
- Family: Glomeridae
- Genus: Glomeris
- Species: G. klugii

Binomial name
- Glomeris klugii Brandt, 1833

Synonyms
- Glomeris conspersa C.L. Koch, 1847; Glomeris undulata C.L. Koch, 1844

= Glomeris klugii =

Species of pill millipede

Glomeris klugii is a species of pill millipede within the genus Glomeris and family Glomeridae. The species is highly variable in colouration, with more than 40 varieties and subspecies identified, each displaying unique colour patterns. The diverse colour patterns of G. klugii can be visually striking, and certain patterns are geographically restricted, leading to the species being associated with numerous taxonomic synonyms.

== Description ==
Glomeris klugii exhibits a wide range of colour variation. Many colour morphs and subspecies exist, each displaying unique colour patterns. The base colour of the species typically ranges from light brown to red, with many possessing vividly coloured chitin and a distinct marbled pattern. However, the presence of black freckles on their bodies varies, with some individuals having freckles that fuse into larger spots, while others are fully black in colour. Some individuals possess repeating patterns resembling arrows. G. klugii can reach a length of about 13.5 mm (0.53 inches) and a width of up to 6.25 mm (0.24 inches). Telopods exhibit syncoxite with slight variations in the central lobe shape and delicately bifurcated coxal horns. G. klugii also lacks a main stria on the thoracic shield.

== Distribution ==
Glomeris klugii can be found throughout Europe and North Africa. Within Europe it has been recorded to live within the countries of Austria, Croatia, Slovenia, Germany and Italy. Within North Africa the species can be found in the countries of Algeria and Tunisia.

== Habitat ==
Glomeris klugii inhabits sloped forest habitats where it has a preference for calcareous soils. Individuals can be found on the forest floor among leaf litter and under stones. Forest habitats are known to consist of trees within the genera Acer, Castanea, Fraxinus.

== Polymorphism ==
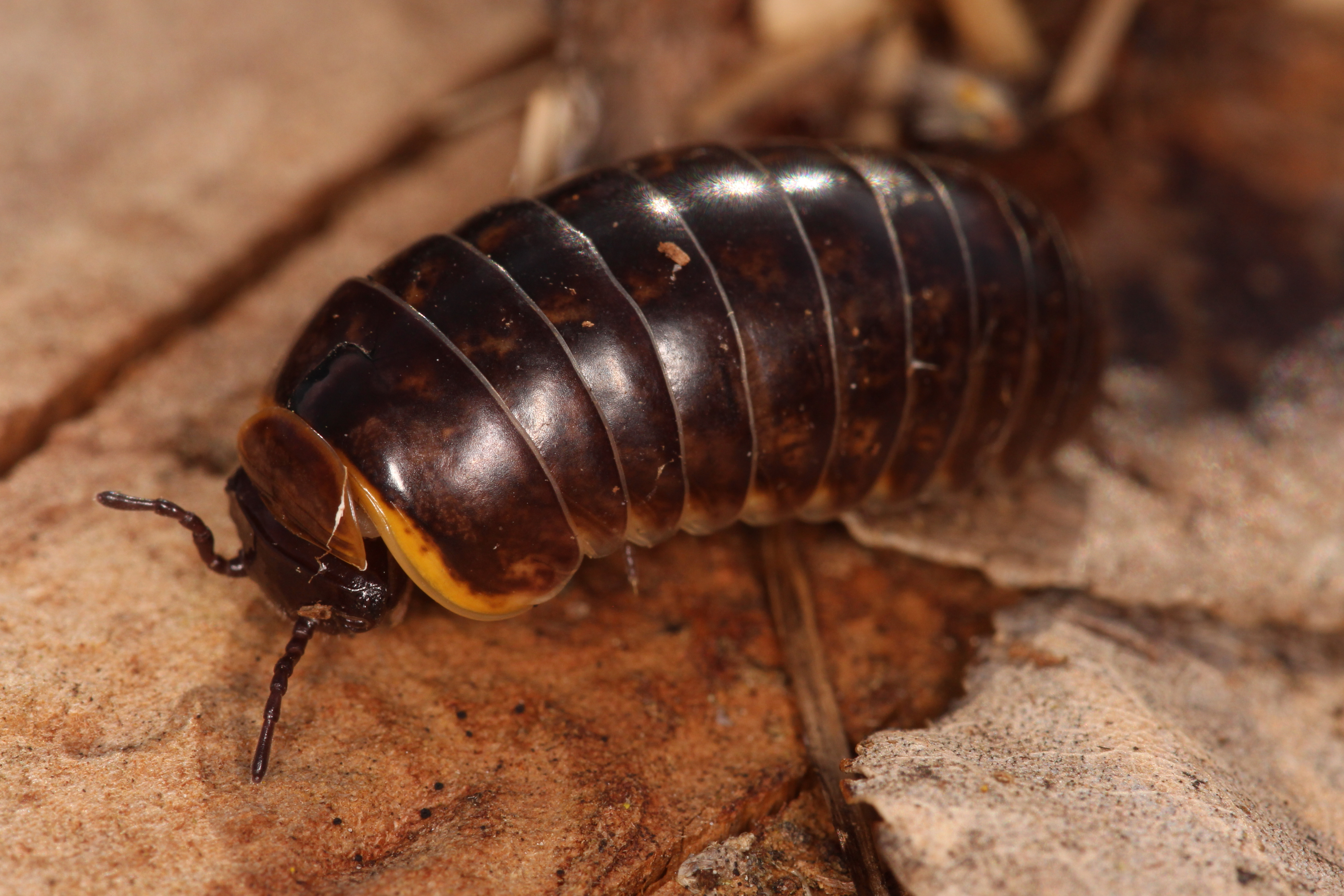
A darker colour variant.

Glomeris klugii possesses a high rate of polymorphism within the species due to exhibiting remarkable phenotypic plasticity, resulting in a wide range of colour variations. More than 40 subspecies and morphs have been identified, each displaying unique colour patterns. Some colour morphs currently known include the 'undulata' morph and the 'conspersa' morph. Although similar colour morphs of G. klugii can be found throughout their natural range, those morphs do not imply populations are closely related or from the same phylogenetically related group. G. klugii of the morph 'conspersa' and 'undulata' for instance are more closely related to each other within the same locality, than with those of the same morph in a different locality.

== Subspecies ==
- Glomeris klugii porphyrea Koch,1847 - from the Balkan Peninsula and Croatia.
