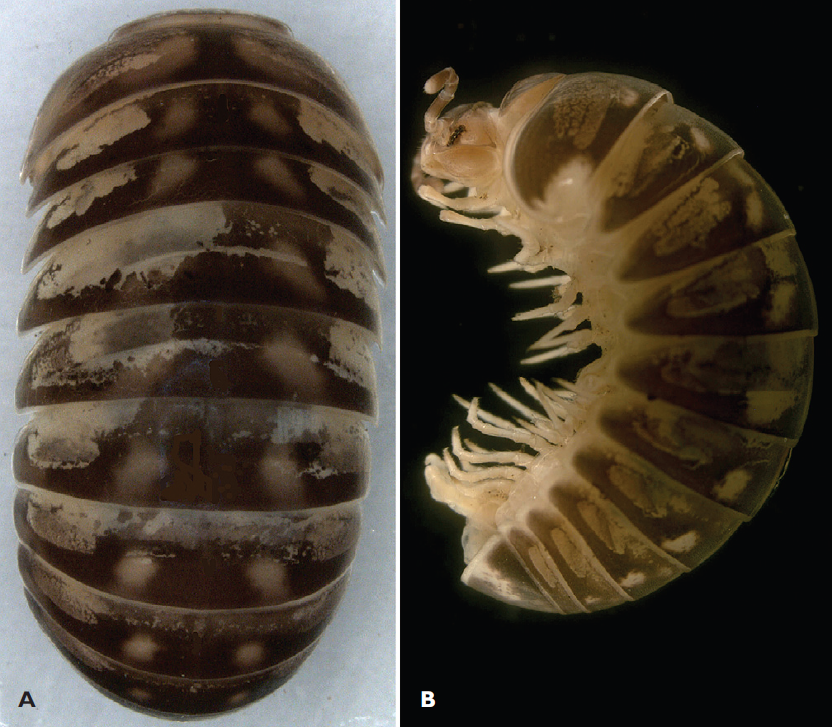

Scientific classification
- Kingdom: Animalia
- Phylum: Arthropoda
- Subphylum: Myriapoda
- Class: Diplopoda
- Order: Glomerida
- Family: Glomeridae
- Genus: Glomeris
- Species: G. punica

Binomial name
- Glomeris punica Attems, 1900
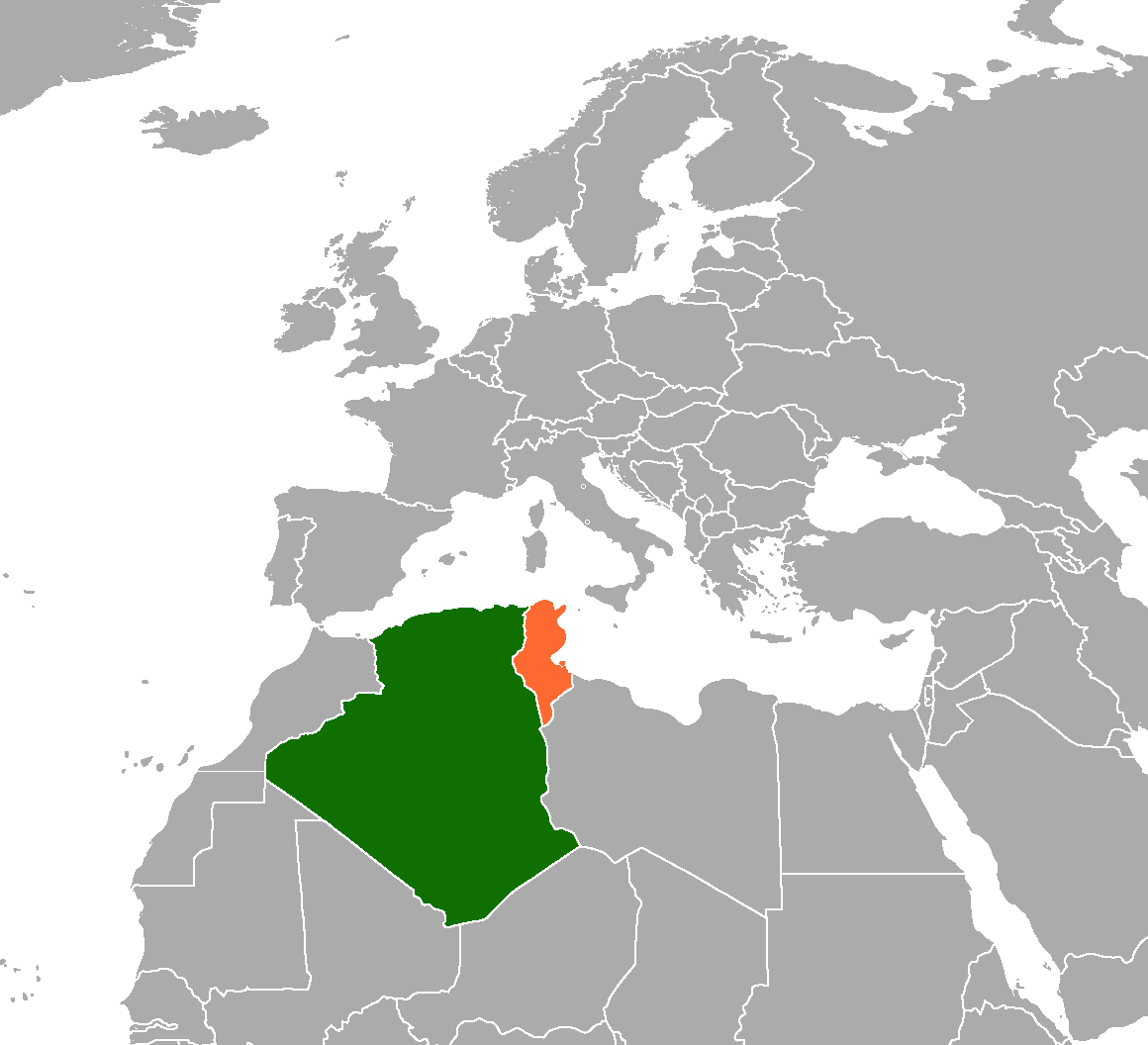
- Glomeris punica is native to Algeria and Tunisia.

Synonyms
- Glomeris connexa punica Attems, 1900; Glomeris connexa var. punica Attems, 1900; Glomeris europaea striata var. punica Attems, 1900; Glomeris numidia Verhoeff, 1920

= Glomeris punica =

Species of pill millipede

Glomeris punica, is a species of pill millipede belonging to the genus Glomeris and the family Glomeridae.

== Description ==
Adults of Glomeris punica exhibit a maximum length of 12 mm and a width of 6 mm. The millipede displays a varied colouration from a light brown to darker shades. The species possesses 2–11 tergites, which display a faded paramedian spot pattern. Male legs numbered 17, 18 and 19 possess well defined telopods. A distinctive feature of the species is the consistently prominent lateral lobe in the 17th coxite of the male.

== Distribution and habitat ==
Glomeris punica is native to North Africa, where it can be found within the countries of Tunisia and Algeria. Both countries share a border, which means they have a direct land boundary that connects them. Both Tunisia and Algeria possess a Mediterranean climate, which is characterized by dry hot summers and wet mild winters. The species inhabits humid Querus and Pinus forests, where G. punica can be found on the forest floor hiding beneath rocks, decaying wood and leaf litter.
