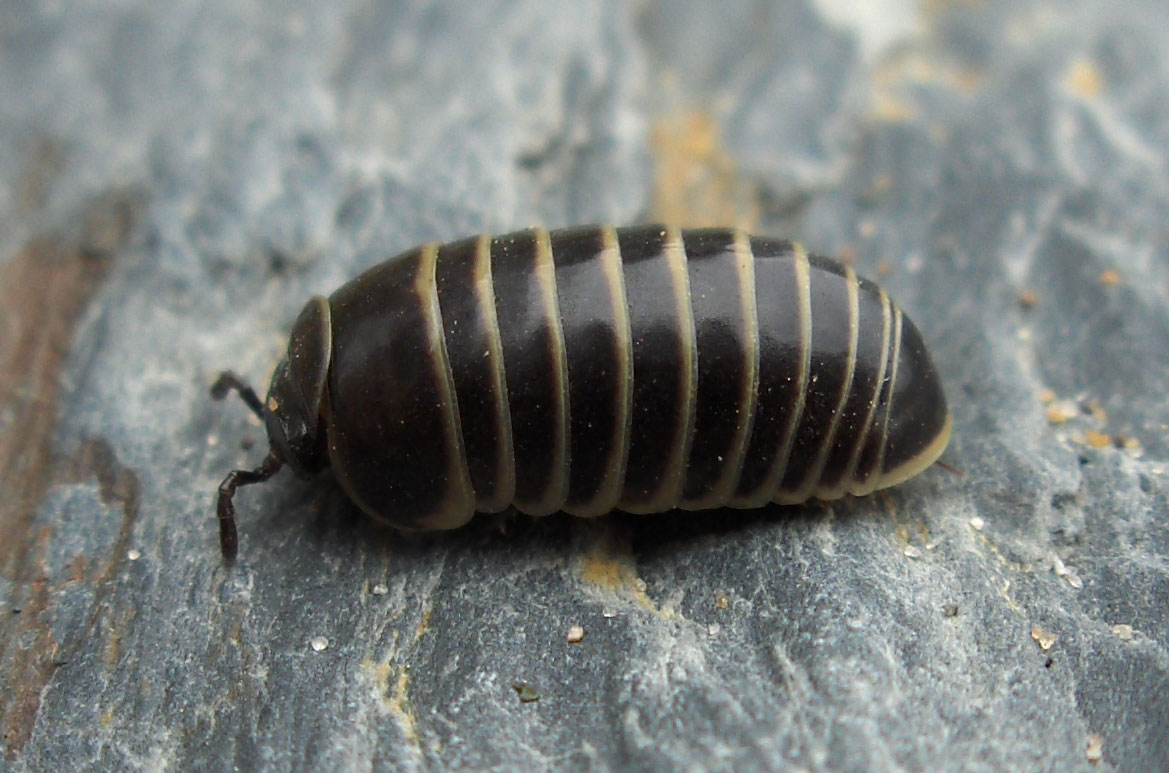
- Glomeris marginata

Scientific classification
- Kingdom: Animalia
- Phylum: Arthropoda
- Subphylum: Myriapoda
- Class: Diplopoda
- Order: Glomerida
- Family: Glomeridae
- Genus: Glomeris; Latreille, 1802

Type species
- Glomeris pustulata (Fabricius, 1781)

= Glomeris =

Genus of millipedes

Glomeris is a genus of pill millipedes that belongs to the family Glomeridae and order Glomerida. The genus Glomeris is the largest within the family Glomeridae, comprising about 100 species along with a few hundred subspecies, varieties, forms, or genetic aberrations. The genus is primarily distributed in Europe, but can also be found in the Canary Islands, North Africa, and North-western Anatolia.

== Description ==
Species within the genus Glomeris exhibit distinct anatomical traits, notably the subquadrate anatomy of the telopod femur, which does not display prominent hypertrophy relative to the adjacent podomeres. Additionally, the telopod femur is equipped with a broad distocaudal lobe rather than a distinct process.

== Distribution and habitat ==
Glomeris species are predominantly found in Europe, although they also occur marginally in other regions. In North Africa, eleven Glomeris species are known to be present, however they are limited to areas located north of the Sahara Desert, specifically along a relatively narrow strip of the Mediterranean coast.

== Ecology ==
Where the geographic range of both the genus Glomeris and Hyleoglomeris overlap, such as in the Balkans and Northwestern Anatolia, it has been observed that all Glomeris species exhibit epigeal behaviour, occupying terrestrial environments above ground level. In contrast, all Hyleoglomeris species display a subterranean lifestyle, dwelling below the surface of the soil.

== Species ==
Below is a list of some of the species within the genus Glomeris:

- Glomeris albida
- Glomeris albidonigra
- Glomeris alluaudi
- Glomeris annulata
- Glomeris aurita
- Glomeris balcanica
- Glomeris bicolor
- Glomeris bimaculata
- Glomeris bureschi
- Glomeris carpathica
- Glomeris castanea
- Glomeris cingulata
- Glomeris connexa
- Glomeris contraria
- Glomeris crassitarsis
- Glomeris dalmatina
- Glomeris dionysii
- Glomeris distichella
- Glomeris dorsosanguine
- Glomeris esterelana
- Glomeris euganeorum
- Glomeris flavolimbata
- Glomeris flavomaculata
- Glomeris formosa
- Glomeris fuscomarmorata
- Glomeris genuensis
- Glomeris gomerana
- Glomeris guttata
- Glomeris helvetica
- Glomeris hexasticha
- Glomeris hispanica
- Glomeris humbertiana
- Glomeris ibizana
- Glomeris inferorum
- Glomeris infuscata
- Glomeris intermedia
- Glomeris interrupta
- Glomeris irrorata
- Glomeris iudicaria
- Glomeris judicaria
- Glomeris klugii
- Glomeris kubana
- Glomeris larii
- Glomeris latemarginata
- Glomeris lepida
- Glomeris ligurica
- Glomeris limbata
- Glomeris longaronensis
- Glomeris lugubris
- Glomeris lunatosignata
- Glomeris lusitana
- Glomeris maculata
- Glomeris maculosa
- Glomeris maerens
- Glomeris malmivaga
- Glomeris marginata
- Glomeris marmorata
- Glomeris norica
- Glomeris numidia
- Glomeris oblongoguttata
- Glomeris obsoleta
- Glomeris occidentalis
- Glomeris occultocolorata
- Glomeris ornata
- Glomeris oropensis
- Glomeris pachytelopoda
- Glomeris perplexa
- Glomeris pielachiana
- Glomeris plumbea
- Glomeris primordialis
- Glomeris prominens
- Glomeris pulchra
- Glomeris punica
- Glomeris pustulata
- Glomeris quadrifasciata
- Glomeris quadripunctata
- Glomeris romana
- Glomeris rugifera
- Glomeris sanguinicolor
- Glomeris saussurei
- Glomeris schubarti
- Glomeris sinensis
- Glomeris solis
- Glomeris stammeri
- Glomeris stellifera
- Glomeris strasseri
- Glomeris sublimbata
- Glomeris tetrasticha
- Glomeris transalpina
- Glomeris tridentina
- Glomeris zonata
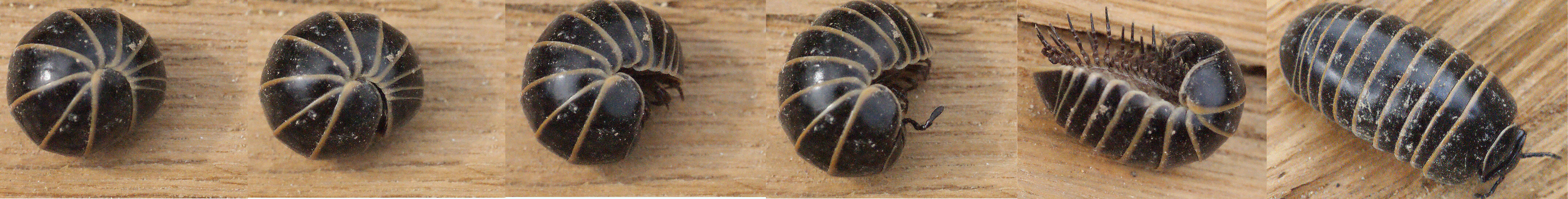
Glomeris marginata, unrolling
