= Glomeridellidae =

Scientific classification
- Kingdom: Animalia
- Phylum: Arthropoda
- Subphylum: Myriapoda
- Class: Diplopoda
- Order: Glomerida
- Family: Glomeridellidae

Family of millipedes

Glomeridellidae is a family of millipedes belonging to the order Glomerida. The adult males in this family have two pairs of telopods (leg pair 18 as well as leg pair 19) rather than the single pair (leg pair 19 only) found in other families in this order.

Genera:

- Albanoglomus Attems, 1926
- Glomeridella Brölemann, 1895
- Tonkinomeris Nguyen, Sierwald & Marek, 2019
- Typhloglomeris Verhoeff, 1898
