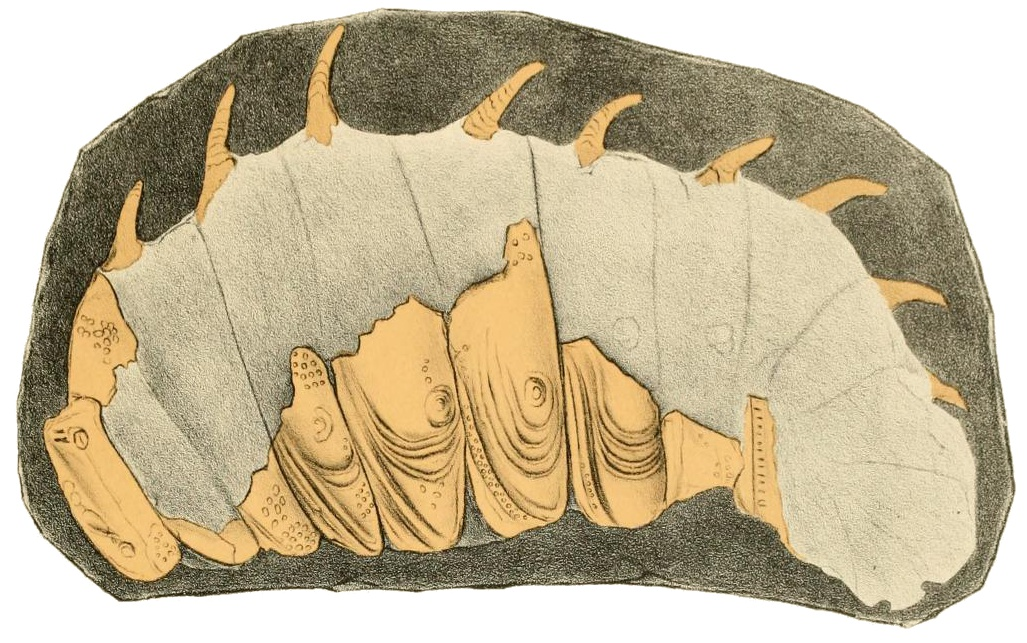
- Amynilyspes crescens

Scientific classification
- Kingdom: Animalia
- Phylum: Arthropoda
- Subphylum: Myriapoda
- Class: Diplopoda
- Superorder: Oniscomorpha
- Genus: †Amynilyspes; Scudder, 1882

Type species
- Amynilyspes wortheni Scudder, 1882

Species
- A. crescens; A. fatimae; A. typicus; A. wortheni

= Amynilyspes =

Extinct genus of millipedes

Amynilyspes is an extinct genus of pill millipedes characterized by fourteen tergites, large eyes, and prominent spines. Individuals measure up to 30 mm (1.2 in) in length.
