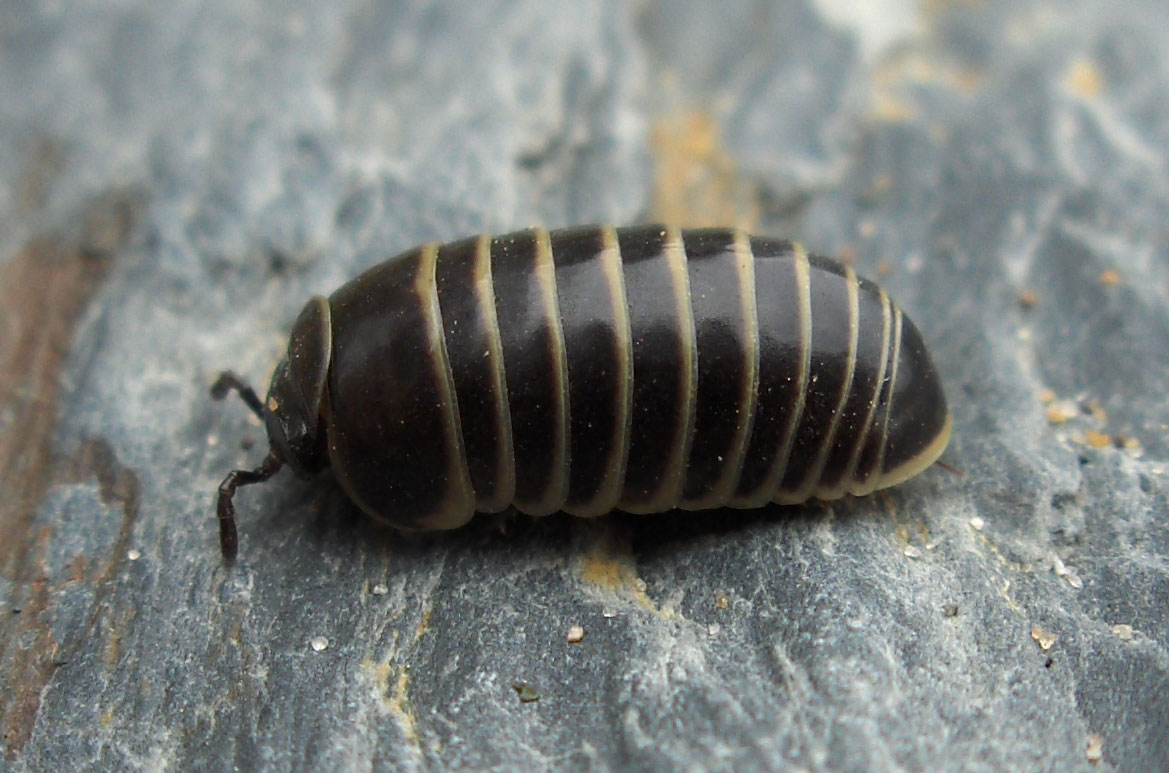

Scientific classification
- Kingdom: Animalia
- Phylum: Arthropoda
- Subphylum: Myriapoda
- Class: Diplopoda
- Order: Glomerida
- Family: Glomeridae
- Genus: Glomeris
- Species: G. marginata

Binomial name
- Glomeris marginata (Villers, 1789)

Synonyms
- Oniscus marginata Villers, 1789

= Glomeris marginata =

Species of millipede

Glomeris marginata is a European species of pill millipede in the family Glomeridae. Like other species in this family, this millipede is short and stout, rounded in cross section, and can roll into a ball when disturbed. This millipede is often confused with the pill woodlouse Armadillidium, which is also capable of rolling into a ball (volvation).

== Distribution ==
Glomeris marginata is found in Europe from the Pyrenees to the British Isles, southern Scandinavia, and the coastal plain of Poland. This species has been recorded in Spain, France, Belgium the Netherlands, Germany, Switzerland, Austria, and Denmark, as well as in Sweden south of Lake Vänern and along the east coast of southern Norway. In the British Isles, this millipede is common in England, Ireland, and Wales, but is found in Scotland only as far north as the Midland Valley. This species is most common in western Europe near the Atlantic. This millipede appears to be averse to prolonged cold and is rarely found more than 300 meters above sea level.

== Description ==
Females of this species range from 8 mm to 20 mm in length and from 4 mm to 8 mm in width, whereas males tend to be somewhat smaller, ranging from 7 mm to 15 mm in length and from 3.5 mm to 6 mm in width. Behind the head, the body of the adult is covered by 12 tergites (dorsal plates), counting the collum as the first and the anal plate (also called the telson) as the last. These tergites are arched like semicircles in cross section. The tergites are usually black with lighter rims but can also be brown, red, or yellow.

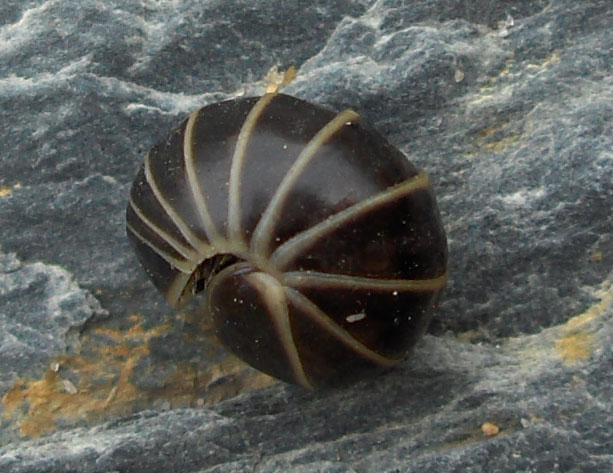
G. marginata just beginning to unroll from its defensive posture

As in other species in the order Glomerida, the collum is reduced in size in this species, whereas the second tergite (also called the thoracic shield) is enlarged to nearly twice the size of the following tergites. When fully rolled into a ball, these millipedes hide the head and collum inside the ball, with the anal shield covering the anterior margin of the thoracic shield. When fully enrolled, G. marginata forms a "pill" shaped like an oblate spheroid rather than a sphere, with the diameter in the vertical plane slightly larger than the width along the transverse axis.

As in other species in this order, the adult female of this species features 17 pairs of legs, and the adult male features 19 leg pairs. Juveniles grow and develop through a series of molts, adding tergites and legs until they reach the numbers observed in the adult stage. These millipedes then continue to molt, but they do not add more segments or legs. This mode of development is known as hemianamorphosis. In this species, the young begin in the first stage with only 8 tergites, 3 leg pairs, and 5 pairs of obvious leg buds. In the second stage, juveniles emerge with 8 tergites and 8 leg pairs; in the third, they emerge with 9 tergites and 10 leg pairs; in the fourth, they emerge with 10 tergites and 12 or 13 leg pairs; in the fifth, they emerge with 11 tergites and 15 leg pairs; and in the sixth, these millipedes emerge with the same numbers observed in adults.

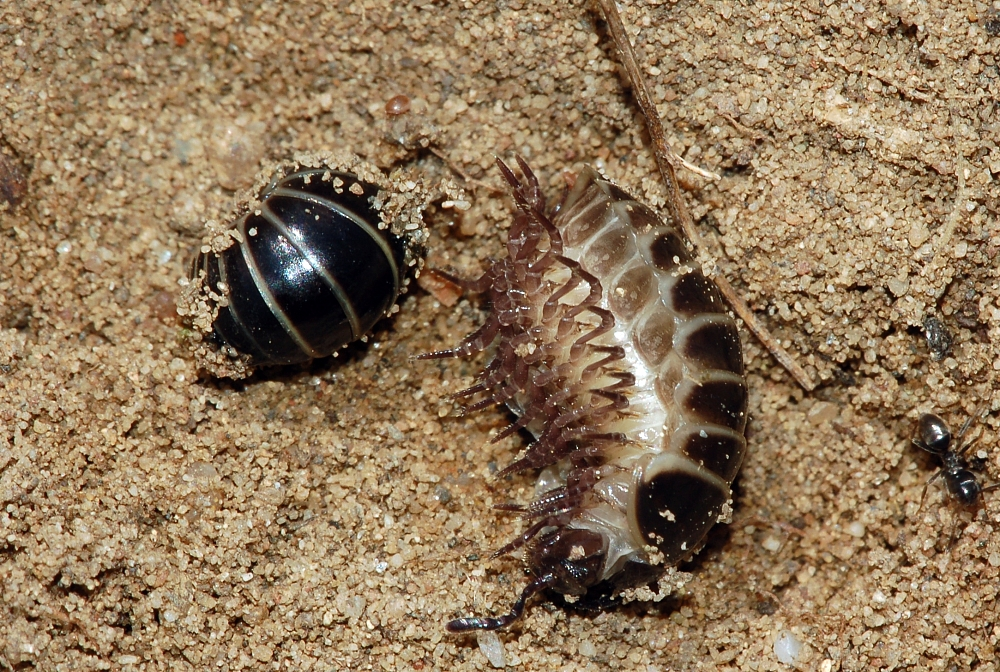
The underside of G. marginata, showing the millipede's many leg pairs

Pill millipedes can be distinguished from pill woodlice based on many differences in their traits. For example, adult woodlice have only 7 pairs of walking legs, whereas adult millipedes have many more leg pairs, and even juveniles of G. marginata have at least 8 pairs of legs or visible leg buds. Furthermore, the tail end of Glomeris is protected by a single large anal shield, whereas the tail end of a woodlouse features multiple smaller plates, including one uropod on each side of the telson. Moreover, when fully rolled into a ball, G. marginata can be distinguished from a fully enrolled pill woodlouse by the shape of the pill that results: pill woodlice roll into more perfect spheres. The cuticle of G. marginata is also darker and shinier than the surface of the pill woodlouse, and the antennae in G. marginata are club-shaped at their distal ends and shorter than those of a pill woodlouse, which features a flagellum at the distal end of each antenna.

== Ecology and habitats ==
Glomeris marginata lives in leaf litter as well as in grass and under stones, with a preference for calcareous soils. In domestic gardens, this millipede can be found along hedgerows and at the bases of old walls, where the mortar has started to crumble, leaching lime into the soil. This species is more tolerant of arid and inhospitable conditions than many other millipedes, and specimens can be found on dry hot sand in the middle of the day. Nevertheless, this species is more active at night and prefers more humid areas. This millipede feeds on old decaying leaves, despite the greater digestibility of freshly fallen leaves. This species can serve an important role in recycling the nutrients in the leaf litter.

Predators of Glomeris marginata include the starling, the common toad, and the woodlouse spider. As well as rolling up into a ball for protection, G. marginata produces noxious chemicals to ward off potential predators, as many millipedes do. When attacked, this species secretes one to eight drops of a viscid fluid containing the quinazolinone alkaloids (glomerin and homoglomerin) dissolved in a watery protein matrix. These chemicals act as antifeedants and toxins to spiders, insects and vertebrates, and the fluid is sticky enough to entrap the legs of ants. After completely discharging these chemical defenses, these millipedes can take up to four months to replenish their supplies.

== Reproduction and life cycle ==
Juveniles of G. marginata develop into mature adults over the course of multiple years. By the sixth stage of anamorphosis, these millipedes reach the adult number of tergites and legs, but they continue to develop through additional (epimorphic) molts. During these epimorphic molts, for example, the last three leg pairs in males differentiate and are modified for use in mating. The last pair are the largest and become telopods, while the other two pairs become paratelopods. Juveniles reach the second, third, or fourth stage of anamorphosis by their first winter. These millipedes reach the fifth, sixth, or seventh stage of development by their second winter, and the seventh, eighth, or ninth stage of life by their third winter. Males reach maturity in their seventh stage, so they are ready to breed by their second or third spring, whereas females reach maturity in their eighth stage, so they are not ready to breed until their third or fourth spring. Adults are present year round but collected most often in the spring and autumn.

The male of this species produces a pheromone from a gland behind his last pair of legs, using this pheromone to communicate with the female and to prepare a female for mating. During mating, the male grasps the female using his telopods, then produces a droplet of sperm from a genital opening behind his second leg pair. The male then passes a pellet with this sperm from leg to leg to the telopods, which place the sperm in the genital opening between the second and third leg pairs of the female. After fertilization, the female of this species produces about 50 eggs, each measuring 0.8 mm in size. The female does not make a nest for these eggs, but like other females in the order Glomerida, females of this species enclose each egg in a capsule of soil passed through the gut.

Females of this species survive after laying eggs to breed again in later years. After first reaching maturity, these females can live long enough to produce seven or eight more annual broods. These millipedes can live as long as ten or eleven years, molting once per year as adults and reaching as many as 15 or 16 stages during their life spans.
