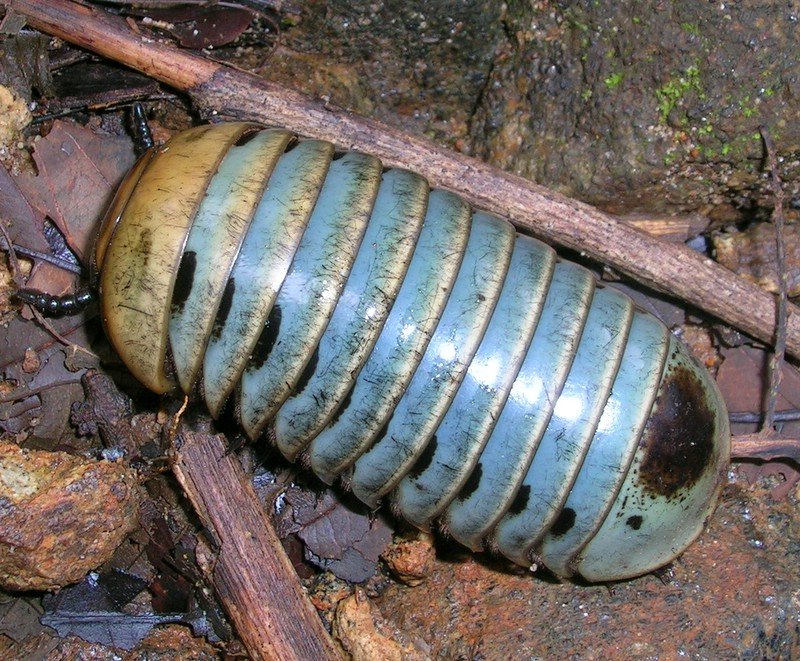
- An Arthrosphaera fumosa giant pill millipede from India.

Scientific classification
- Kingdom: Animalia
- Phylum: Arthropoda
- Subphylum: Myriapoda
- Class: Diplopoda
- Subclass: Chilognatha
- Infraclass: Pentazonia
- Superorder: Oniscomorpha; Pocock, 1887

Orders
- Glomerida; Sphaerotheriida; †Amynilyspedida

Synonyms
- Armadillomorpha Verhoeff, 1915

= Pill millipede =

Pill millipedes

Superorder of millipedes

Pill millipedes are any members of two living (and one extinct) orders of millipedes, often grouped together into a single superorder, Oniscomorpha. The name Oniscomorpha refers to the millipedes' resemblance to a certain woodlouse (Oniscidea), also called pillbug or roly-poly. However, millipedes and woodlice are not closely related (belonging to the subphyla Myriapoda and Crustacea, respectively); rather, this is a case of convergent evolution.

== Description ==
Pill millipedes are relatively short-bodied compared to most other millipedes, with only eleven to thirteen body segments, and are capable of rolling into a ball (volvation) when disturbed, as a defense against predators. This ability evolved separately in each of the two orders, making it a case of convergent evolution, rather than homology. They can also exude a noxious liquid, which may be both caustic and toxic among other millipede taxa, but is not in pill millipedes——Glomerida secretes a clear, odorless liquid from the midline of the back that contains toxic alkaloids and has a sedative effect to repel predators. Sphaerotheriida lack such adaptation, relying purely on their shell to deter predation. Pill millipedes are detritivorous, feeding on decomposing plant matter, usually in woodlands.

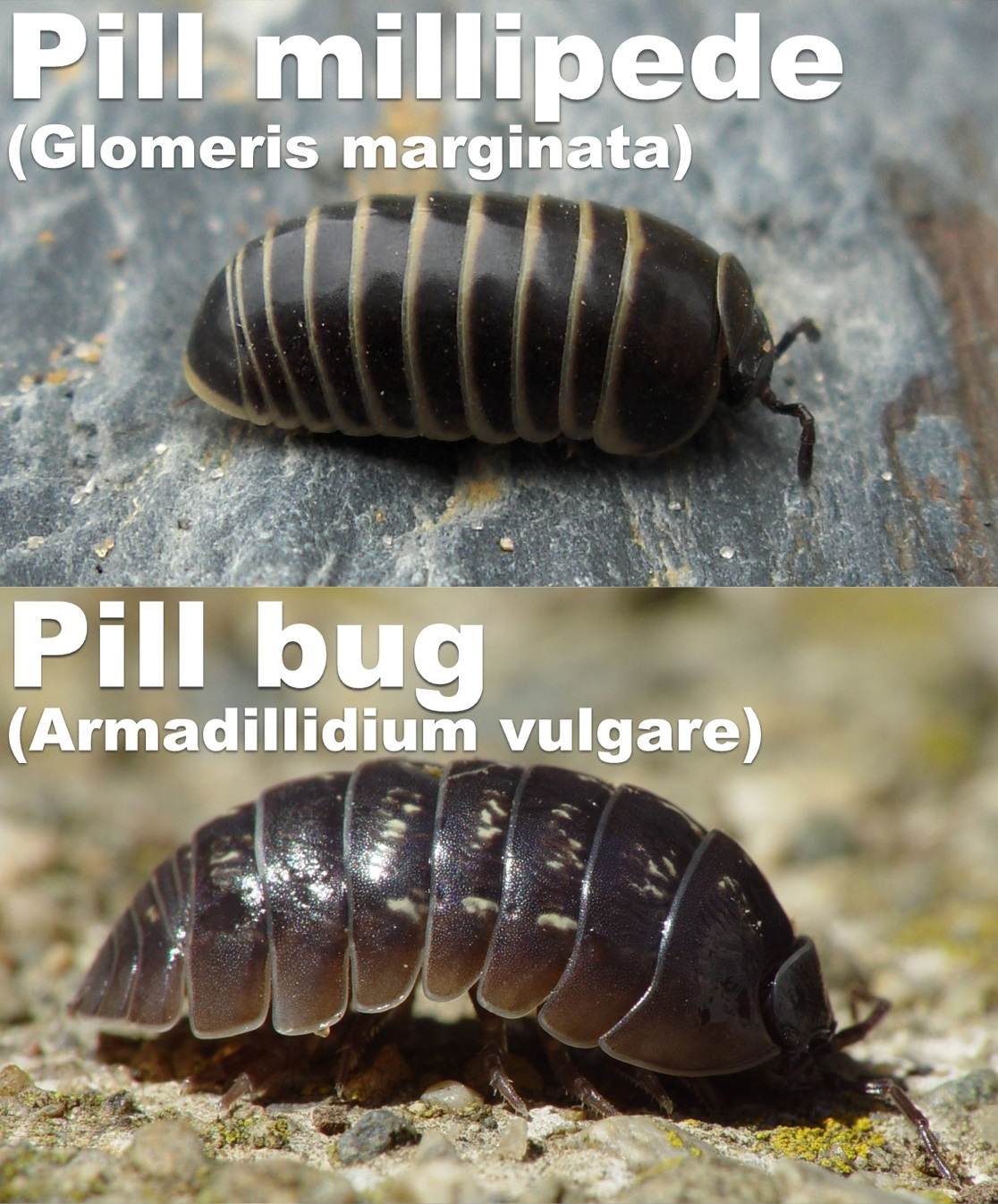
Comparison of a pill millipede (above: Glomeris marginata) and a pillbug (below: Armadillidium vulgare)

== Orders ==
=== Glomerida ===
The order Glomerida is predominantly found in the Northern Hemisphere and includes species such as Glomeris marginata, the common European pill millipede. They have from eleven to twelve body segments, and possess dorsal ozopores (openings of the repugnatorial glands) rather than the lateral ozopores found on many other millipedes. Glomeridans reach maximum lengths of 20 mm (0.79 in), and eyes, if present, are in a single row of ocelli. The order contains approximately 450 species found in Europe, South-east Asia and the Americas from California to Guatemala. Four species are present in the British Isles.

=== Sphaerotheriida ===
The order Sphaerotheriida is a Gondwana-distribution taxon, with around 350 species in southern Africa, Madagascar, Australasia and South East Asia. Five species, all in the genus Procyliosoma are present in New Zealand, and around thirty species are present in Australia. Sphaerotheriidans have thirteen body segments, and do not possess repugnatorial glands. Spherotheriidans reach larger size than Glomeridans (up to 10 cm (3.9 in)), and always possess large, kidney-shaped eyes.

=== Amynilyspedida ===
Oniscomorpha also includes the extinct order Amynilyspedida from the upper Carboniferous of North America and Europe. Amynilyspedida differs from the other Oniscomorph orders in having 14–15 segments. The order contains the genus Amynilyspes with unique spines on the tergites, as well as Glomeropsis, Archiscudderia, and Palaeosphaeridium.
