= List of non-marine molluscs of Guatemala =

Non-marine molluscs of Guatemala

The non-marine molluscs of Guatemala are a part of the molluscan wildlife of Guatemala. A number of species of non-marine molluscs are found in the wild in Guatemala.

== Freshwater gastropods ==
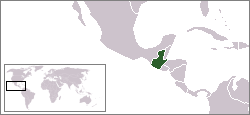
Location of Guatemala

Pachychilidae

- Pachychilus oerstedii Mörch, 1861
- Pachychilus corvinus Morelet, 1849
- Pachychilus immanis Morelet, 1851
- Pachychilus lacustris Morelet, 1849

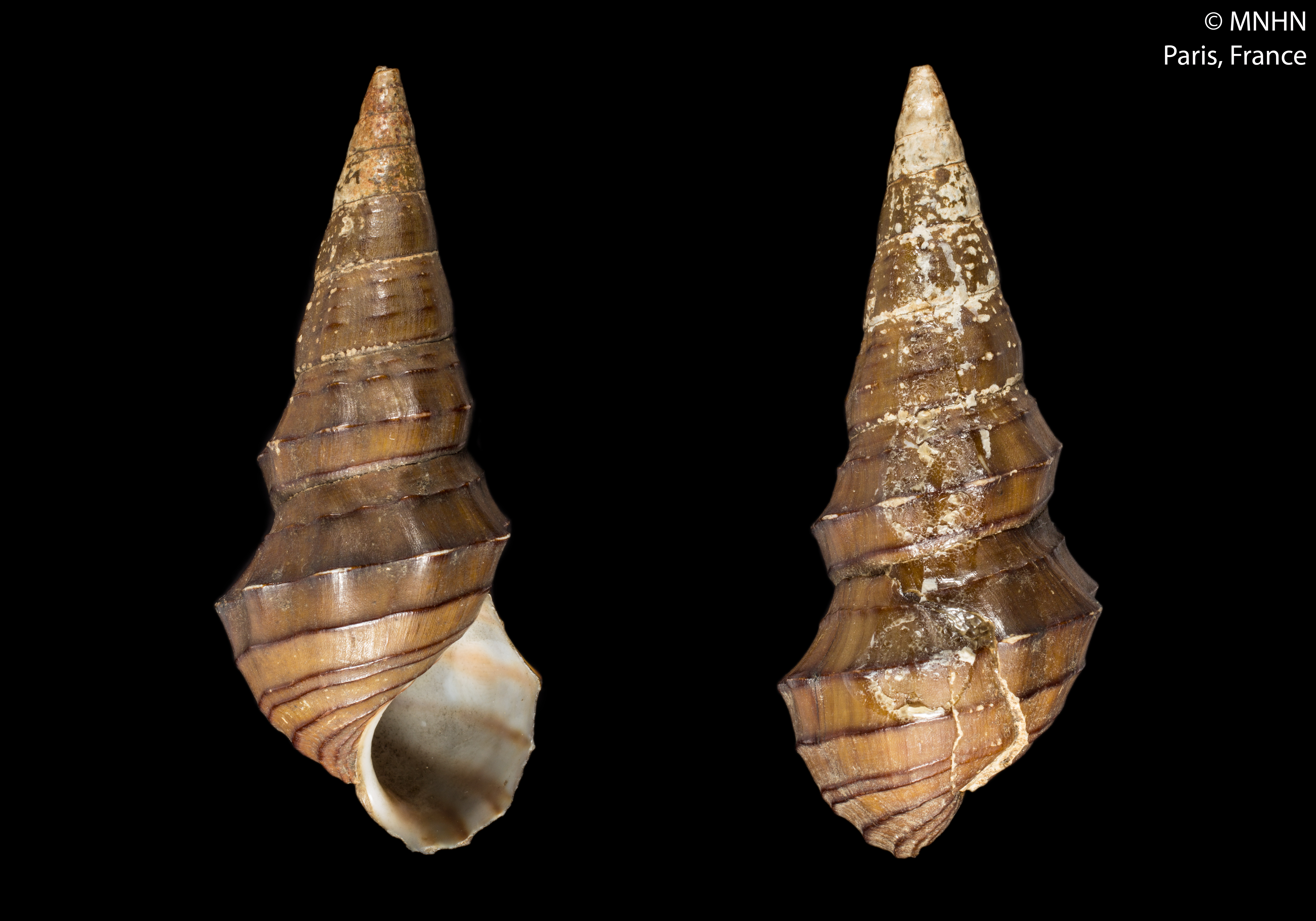
Pachychilus glaphyrus

- Pachychilus liebmanni R.A.Philippi, 1848
- Pachychilus pilsbryi E.von Martens, 1899
- Pachychilus pasionensis Pilsbry, 1956
- Pachychilus glaphyrus Morelet, 1849
- Pachychilus pyramidalis Morelet, 1849
- Pachychilus indiorum Morelet, 1849
- Pachychilus hinkleyi W.B.Marshall, 1920
- Pachychilus obeliscus Reeve, 1861
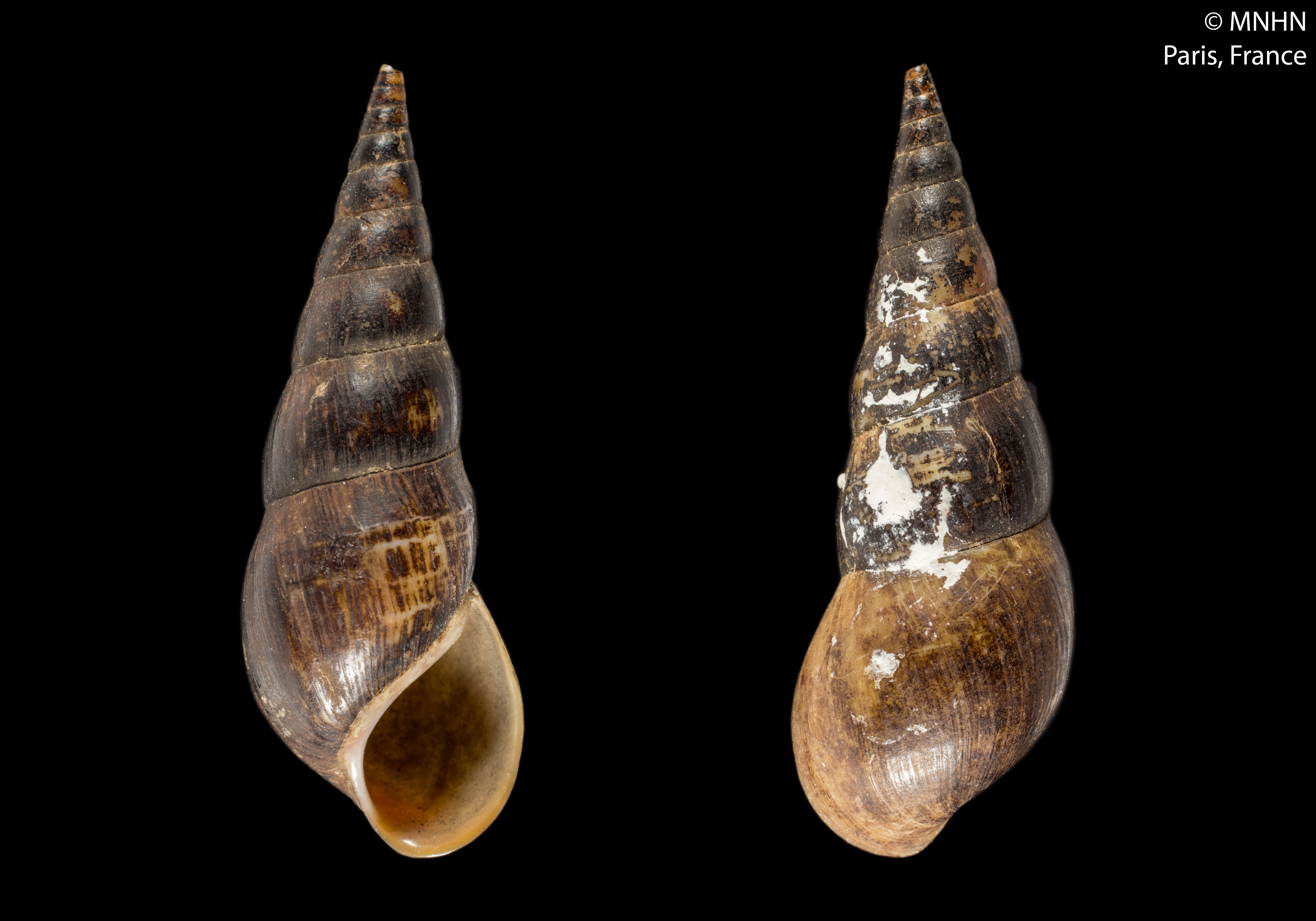
  Pachychilus graphium
- Pachychilus pottsianus Hinkley, 1920
- Pachychilus cinereus Morelet, 1849
- Pachychilus largillierti R.A.Philippi, 1843
- Pachychilus graphium Morelet, 1849
- Pachychilus panucula Morelet, 1851
- Pachychilus sargi Crosse & P.Fischer, 1875
- Pachychilus schumoi Pilsbry, 1931
- Pachychilus olssoni Pilsbry, 1950
- Pachychilus laevissimus G.B.Sowerby I, 1824
- Pachychilus intermedius Busch, 1844
- Pachychilus gassiesii Reeve, 1860
- Pachychilus planensis I.Lea, 1858
- Pachychilus subexaratus Crosse & P.Fischer, 1891
- Pachychilus cumingii I.Lea & H.C.Lea, 1851
- Pachychilus polygonatus I.Lea & H.C.Lea, 1851
- † Melania inquinata Defrance, 1823

Planorbidae

- Biomphalaria helophila d'Orbigny, 1835
- Biomphalaria orbicula Morelet, 1849
- Biomphalaria subprona E.von Martens, 1899
- Biomphalaria prona E.von Martens, 1873
- Biomphalaria obstructa Morelet, 1849
- Biomphalaria havanensis L.Pfeiffer, 1839
- Drepanotrema kermatoides d'Orbigny, 1835
- Drepanotrema depressissimum Moricand, 1839
- Drepanotrema lucidum L.Pfeiffer, 1839
- Drepanotrema anatinum d'Orbigny, 1835
- Drepanotrema cultratum d'Orbigny, 1841
- Planorbella fovealis Menke, 1830

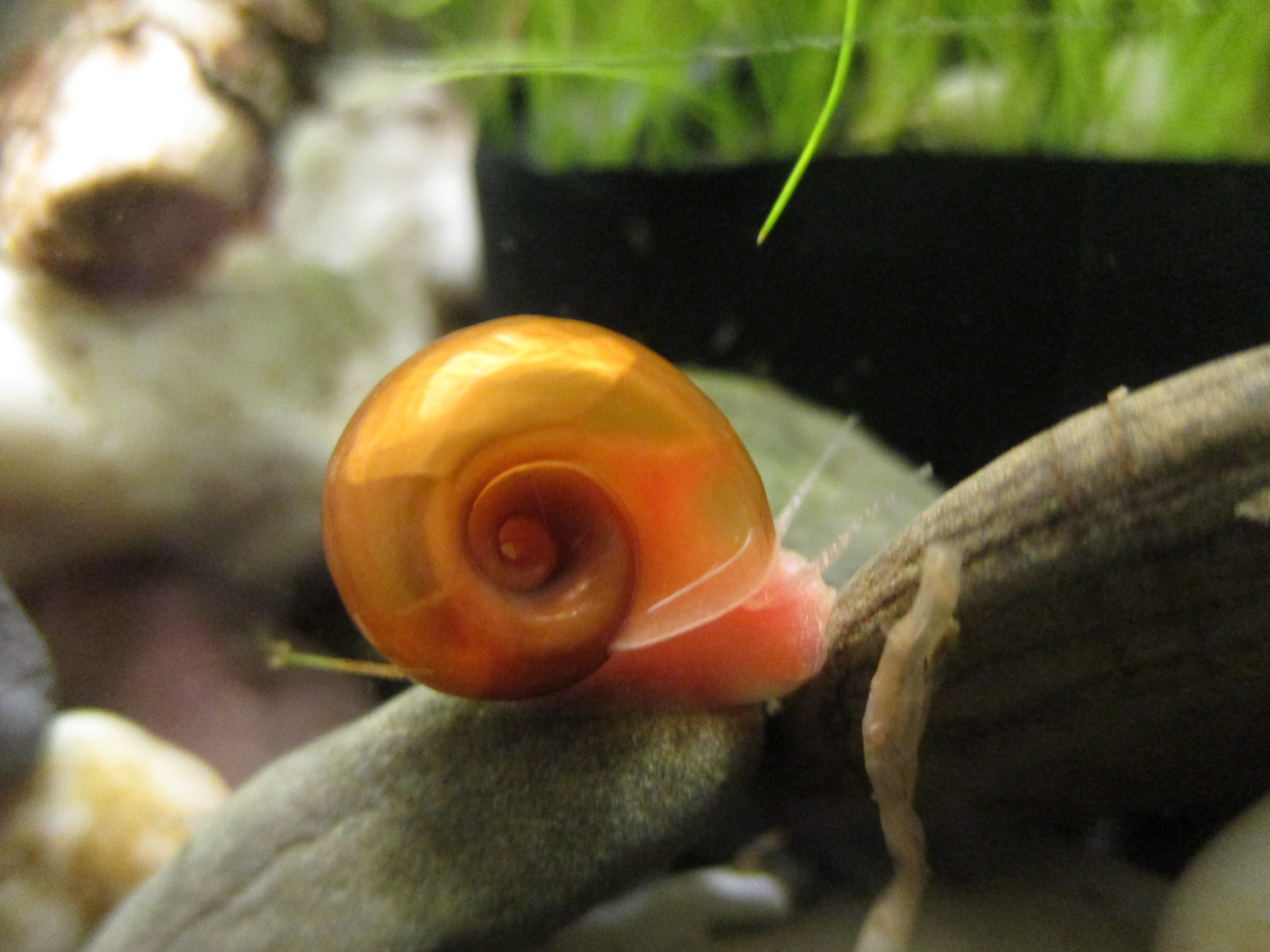
Planorbella duryi

- Planorbella trivolvis Say, 1817
- Planorbella tenuis Dunker, 1850
- Planorbella caloderma Pilsbry, 1923
- Planorbella duryi Wetherby, 1879
- Gundlachia radiata Guilding, 1828
- Gundlachia hinkleyi B.Walker, 1917
- Gundlachia hjalmarsoni L.Pfeiffer, 1858
- Planorbis wyldi Tristram, 1861
- Planorbis yzabalensis Crosse & P.Fischer, 1879
- Laevapex aguadae C.Goodrich & van der Schalie, 1937
- Laevapex papillaris E.von Martens, 1899
- Uncancylus concentricus d'Orbigny, 1835
- Hebetoncylus excentricus Morelet, 1851

Cochliopidae

- Aroapyrgus stolli E.von Martens,1901
- Aroapyrgus petenensis Morelet,1851
- Aroapyrgus pasionensis C.Goodrich & Van der Schalie, 1937
- Aroapyrgus panzosensis B.Walker, 1919
- Aroapyrgus chefinesnoel Rolán, 2010
- Aroapyrgus hinkleyi B.Walker, 1919
- Aroapyrgus cisterninus B.Walker, 1919
- Aroapyrgus clenchi C.Goodrich & Van der Schalie, 1937
- Aroapyrgus guatemalensis P.Fischer & Crosse, 1891
- Aroapyrgus panamensis Tryon, 1863
- Aroapyrgus conchensensis B.Walker, 1919
- Cochliopina guatemalensis Morelet, 1851
- Cochliopina infundibulum E.von Martens, 1899
- Cochliopina dulcensis W.B.Marshall, 1920
- Cochliopina izabal Pilsbry, 1920
- Cochliopina hinkleyi Pilsbry, 1920
- Cochliopina minor Pilsbry, 1920
- Cochliopina francesae C.Goodrich & Van der Schalie, 1937
- Pyrgophorus coronatus L.Pfeiffer, 1840
- Pyrgophorus parvulus Guilding, 1828
- Pyrgophorus vulcani E.von Martens, 1901
- Pyrgophorus wrighti Ancey, 1888
- Tryonia clathrata W.Stimpson, 1865
- Tryonia exiguus Morelet, 1851

Physidae

- Mexinauta gracilentus P.Fischer & Crosse, 1886
- Mexinauta impluviatus Morelet, 1849
- Mexinauta nicaraguanus Morelet, 1851
- Mexinauta peruvianus J.E.Gray, 1828
- Mexinauta nitens R.A.Philippi, 1841
- Mexinauta princeps Phillips, 1846
- Mexinauta laetus E.von Martens, 1898

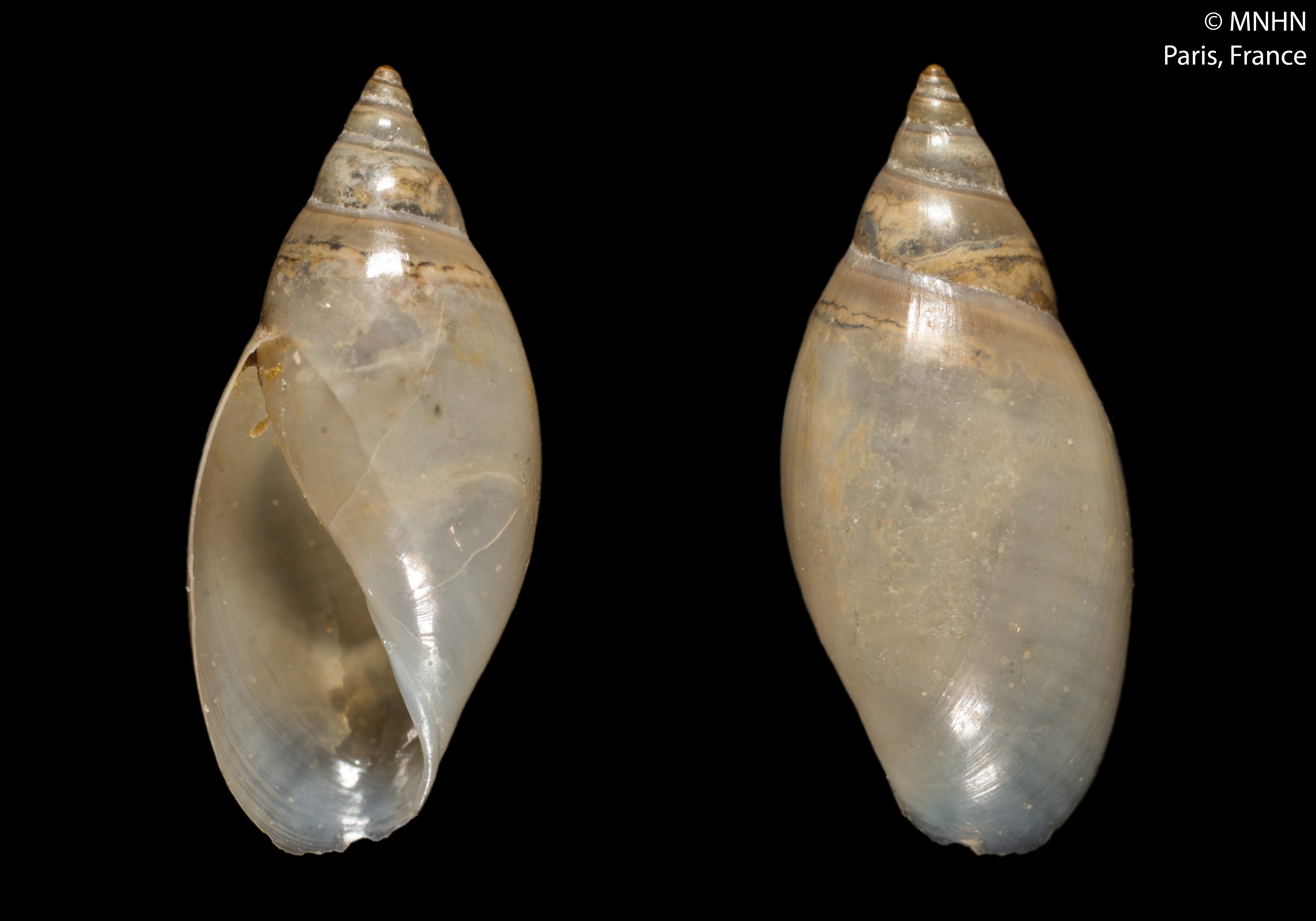
Mayabina spiculata

- Mayabina petenensis D.W. Taylor, 2003
- Mayabina pliculosa E.von Martens, 1898
- Mayabina tapanensis Crosse & P.Fischer, 1882
- Mayabina spiculata Morelet, 1849
- Physella acuta Draparnaud, 1805
- Physella squalida Morelet, 1851
- Physella moreleti D.W.Taylor, 2003
- Stenophysa marmorata Guilding, 1828
- Stenophysa maugeriae J.E.Gray, 1837
- Austrinauta elatus A.Gould, 1853

Neritidae

- Vitta virginea Linnaeus, 1758
- Vitta usnea Röding, 1798
- Vitta piratica H.D.Russell, 1940
- Vitta clenchi H.D.Russell, 1940
- Vitta luteofasciata K.Miller, 1879
- Nereina punctulata Lamarck, 1816
- Clypeolum latissimum Broderip, 1833
- Neritina gagates Lamarck, 1822

Ampullariidae

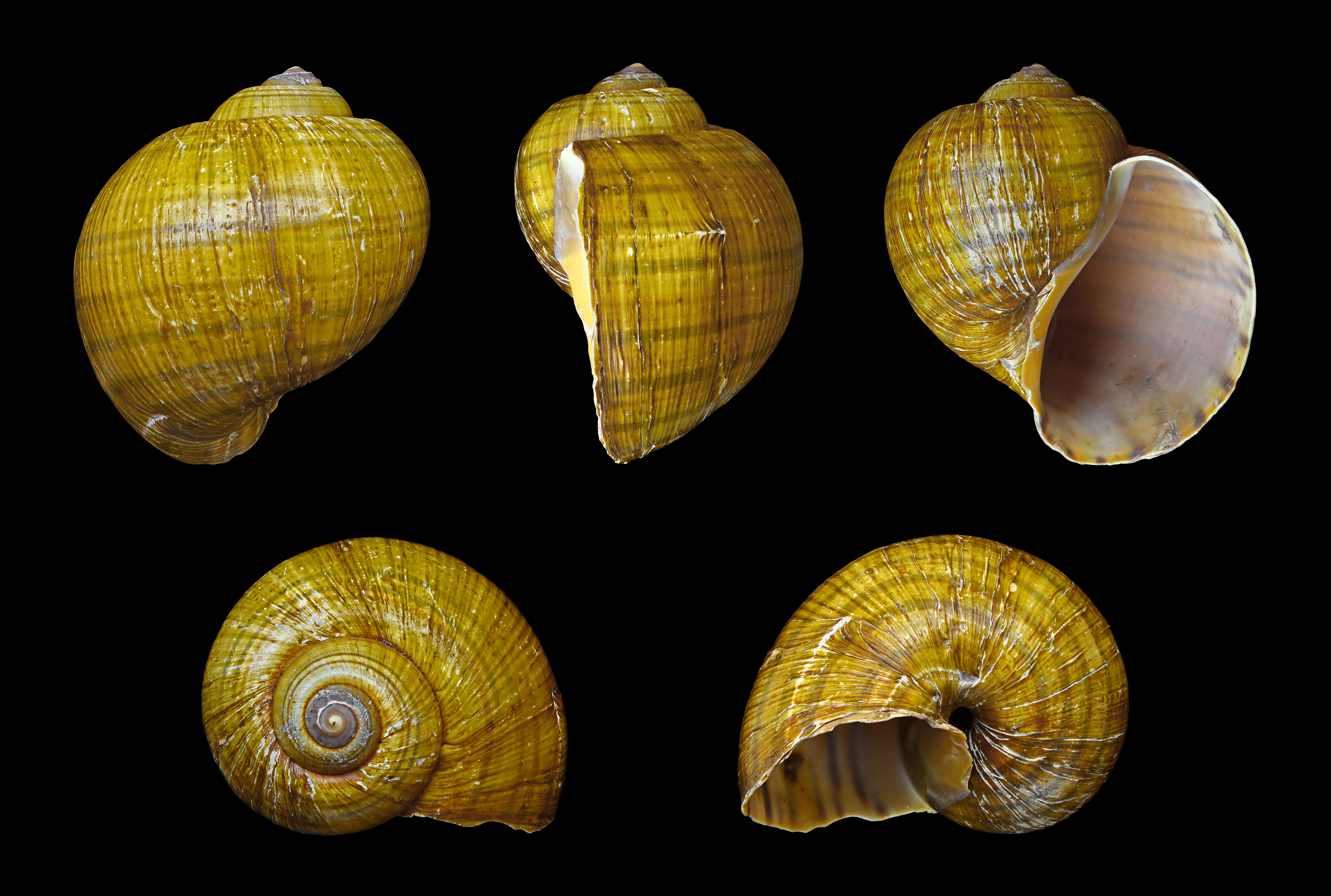
Pomacea canaliculata

- Pomacea flagellata Say, 1829
- Pomacea lattrei Reeve, 1856
- Pomacea paludosa Say, 1829
- Pomacea canaliculata Lamarck, 1822
- Pomacea gigantea Barbosa Rodrigues, 1892

Thiaridae

- Melanoides tuberculata O.F.Müller, 1774
- Melania murrea Reeve, 1860
- Melania opiparis Morelet, 1851

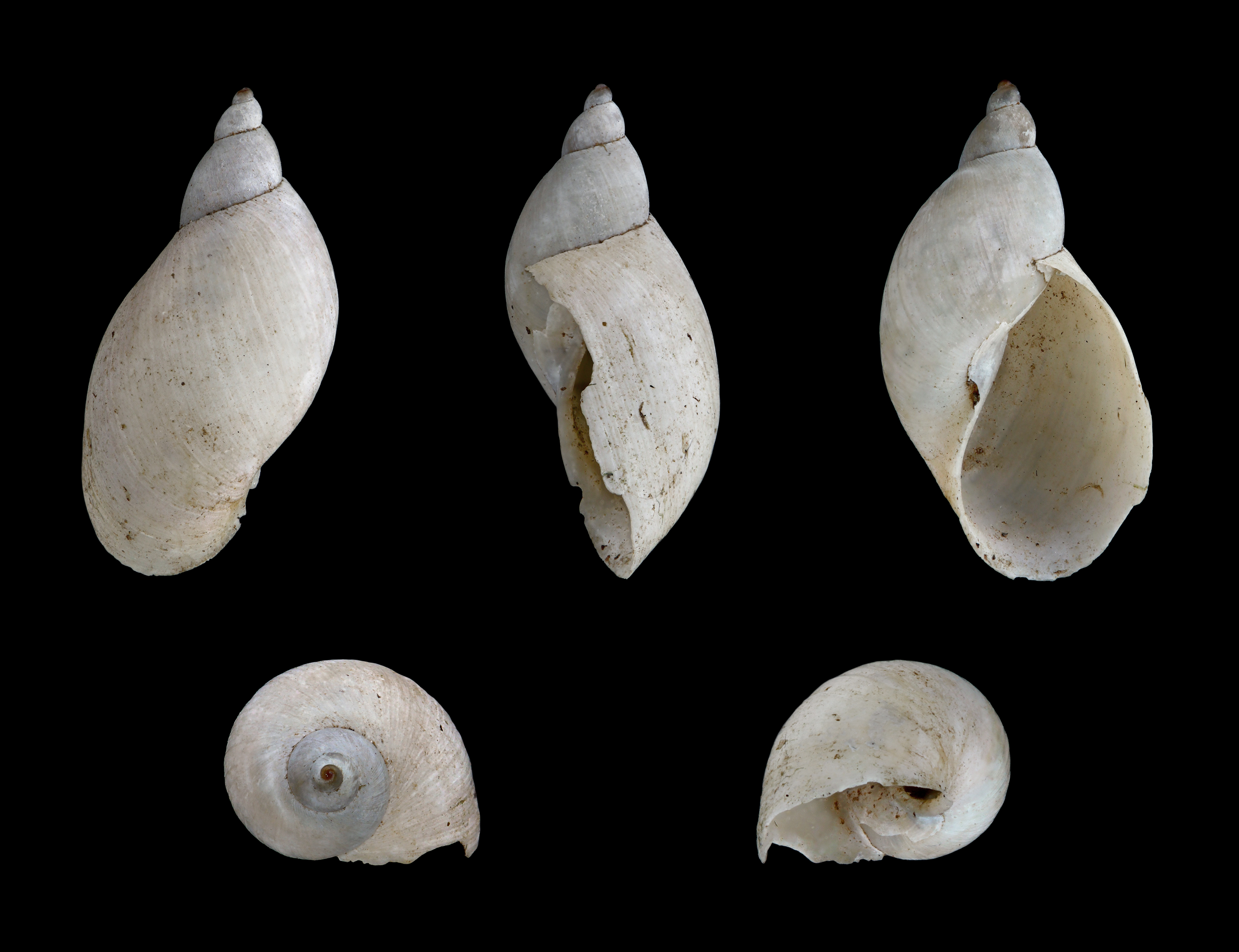
Pseudosuccinea columella

- Tarebia granifera Lamarck, 1816

Lymnaeidae

- Pseudosuccinea columella Say, 1817
- Galba cubensis L.Pfeiffer, 1839

Pleuroceridae

- Pleurocera acuta Rafinesque, 1824

Acroloxidae

- Acroloxus culicoides d'Orbigny, 1835

Viviparidae

- Paludina hyalina Morelet, 1851

== Land gastropods ==
Spiraxidae

- Euglandina carminensis Morelet, 1849
- Euglandina pilsbryi Bartsch, 1909
- Euglandina ghiesbreghti L.Pfeiffer, 1856
- Euglandina aurata Morelet, 1849
- Euglandina striata O.F.Müller, 1774
- Euglandina decussata Deshayes, 1840
- Euglandina cylindracea Phillips, 1846

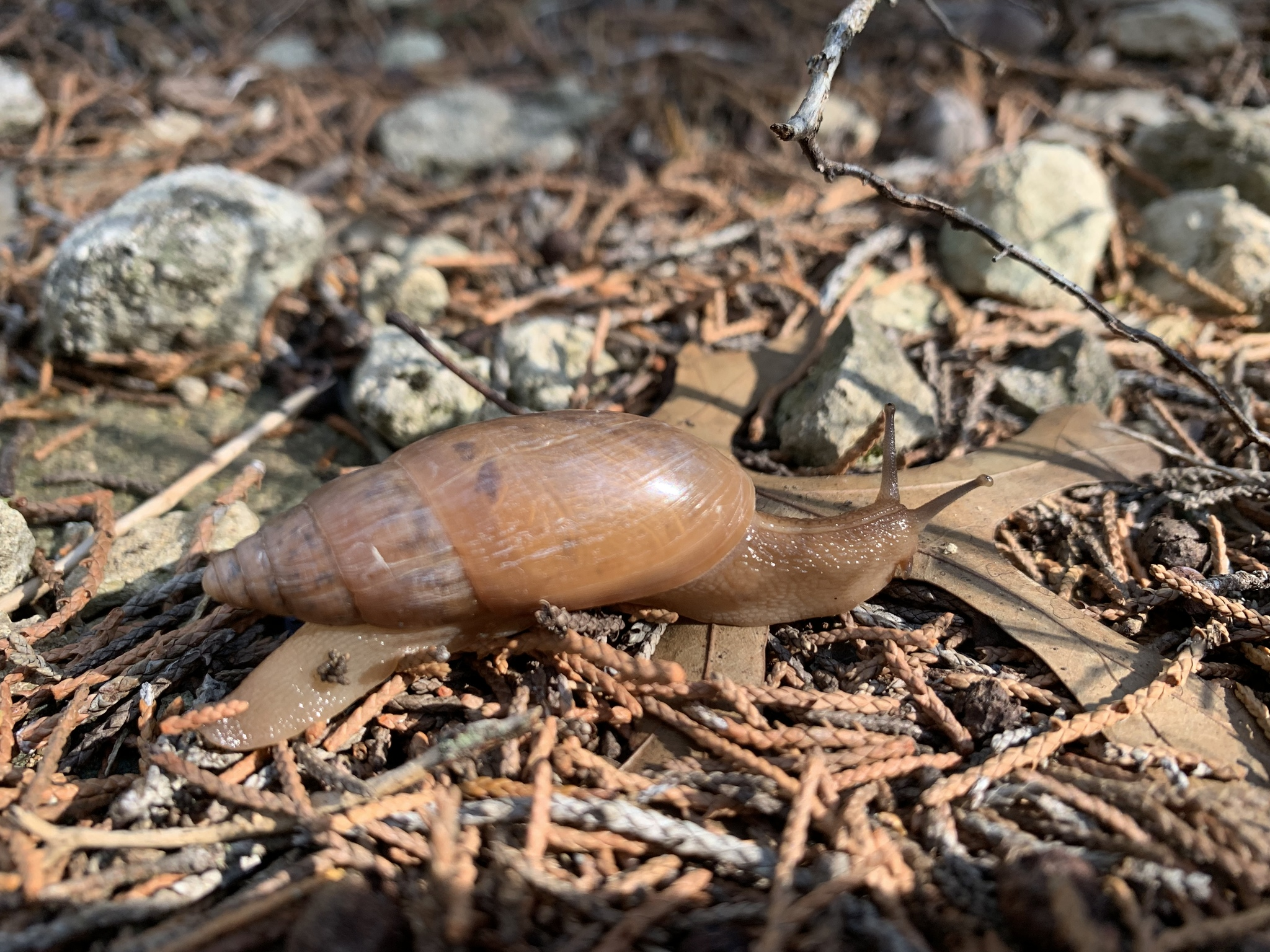
Euglandina singleyana

- Euglandina binneyana L.Pfeiffer, 1845
- Euglandina sowerbyana L.Pfeiffer, 1846
- Euglandina singleyana W.G.Binney, 1892
- Euglandina vanuxemensis I.Lea, 1834
- Euglandina huehuetenangoensis F.G.Thompson, 1995
- Euglandina pinicola P.Fischer & Crosse, 1870
- Euglandina titan F.G.Thompson, 1987
- Euglandina pan F.G.Thompson, 1987
- Euglandina cumingi H.Beck, 1837
- Euglandina dactylus Broderip, 1832
- Streptostyla physodes Shuttleworth, 1852
- Streptostyla mitraeformis Shuttleworth, 1852
- Streptostyla glandiformis Crosse & P.Fischer, 1868
- Streptostyla sololensis Crosse & P.Fischer, 1869
- Streptostyla turgidula L.Pfeiffer, 1857
- Streptostyla binneyana Crosse & P.Fischer, 1869
- Streptostyla meridana Morelet, 1849
- Streptostyla lurida Shuttleworth, 1852
- Streptostyla crassa Strebel, 1878

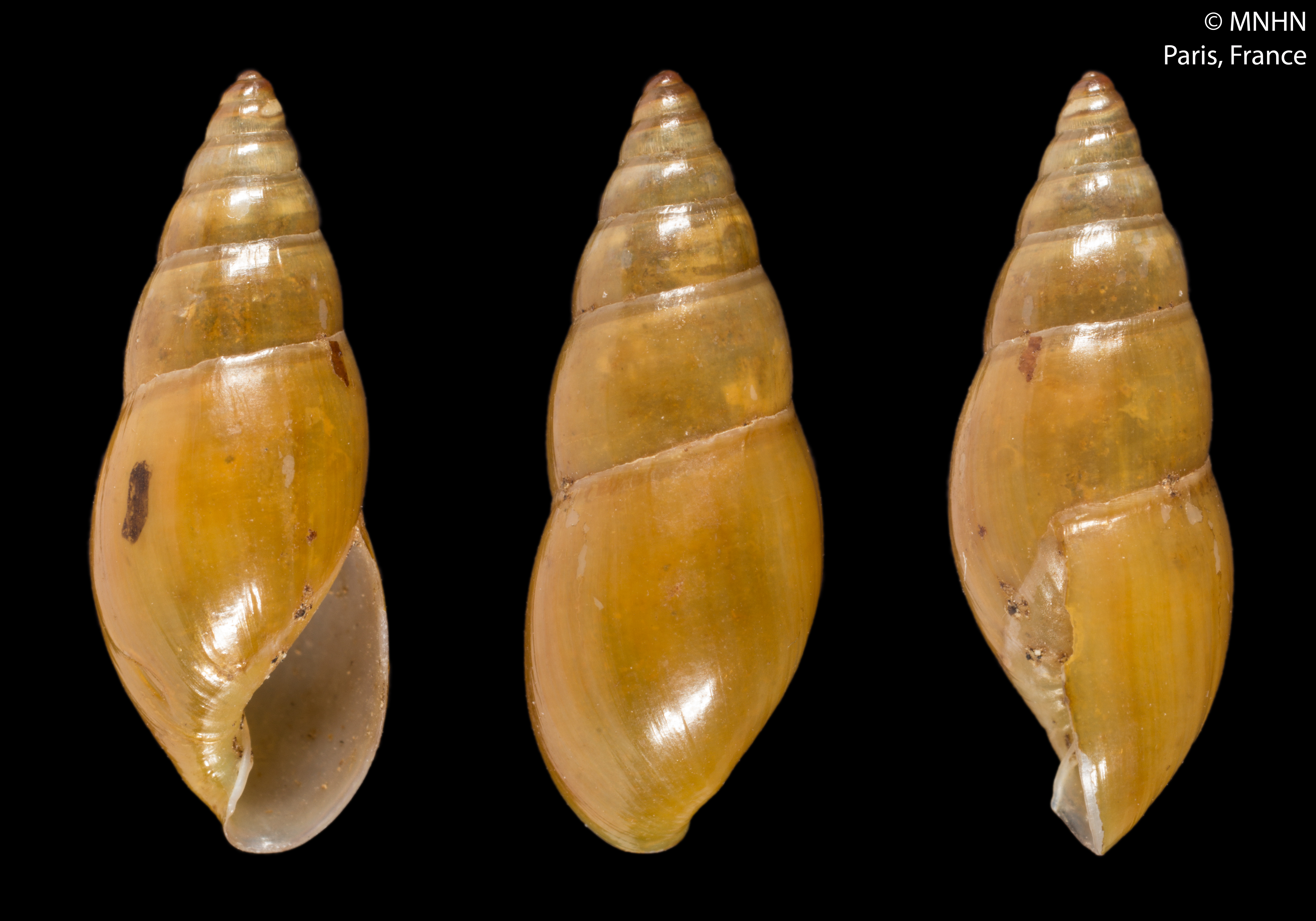
Streptostyla sargi

- Streptostyla irrigua Shuttleworth, 1852
- Streptostyla ligulata Morelet, 1849
- Streptostyla nigricans L.Pfeiffer, 1845
- Streptostyla sargi Crosse & P.Fischer, 1875
- Streptostyla dysoni L.Pfeiffer, 1846
- Streptostyla lattrei L.Pfeiffer, 1846
- Streptostyla delibuta Morelet, 1851
- Pseudosubulina martensiana Pilsbry, 1920
- Pseudosubulina fortis E.von Martens, 1898
- Pseudosubulina berendti L.Pfeiffer, 1862
- Pseudosubulina salvini E.von Martens, 1898
- Pseudosubulina splendens F.G.Thompson, 1959
- Pseudosubulina mitescens E.von Martens, 1898
- Volutaxis sulciferus Morelet, 1851
- Volutaxis nitidus Strebel, 1882
- Volutaxis scalariopsis Morelet, 1851
- Volutaxis livingstonensis Pilsbry, 1920
- Volutaxis longior Pilsbry, 1920
- Salasiella hinkleyi Pilsbry, 1920
- Salasiella modesta L.Pfeiffer, 1862
- Salasiella margaritacea L.Pfeiffer, 1857
- Salasiella guatemalensis Pilsbry, 1920
- Rectaxis funibus Goodrich & van der Schalie, 1937
- Rectaxis alvaradoi Goodrich & van der Schalie, 1937
- Varicoglandina monilifera L.Pfeiffer, 1845
- Varicoglandina rubiginosa F.G.Thompson, 1995
- Subulina stolli E.von Martens, 1898
- Subulina sargi Crosse & P.Fischer, 1877
- Myxastyla pycnota F.G.Thompson, 1995
- Myxastyla hyalina F.G.Thompson, 1995
- Guillarmodia cordovana L.Pfeiffer, 1857
- Achatina lirifera Morelet, 1851
- Poiretia dilatata R.A.Philippi, 1836

Bulimulidae

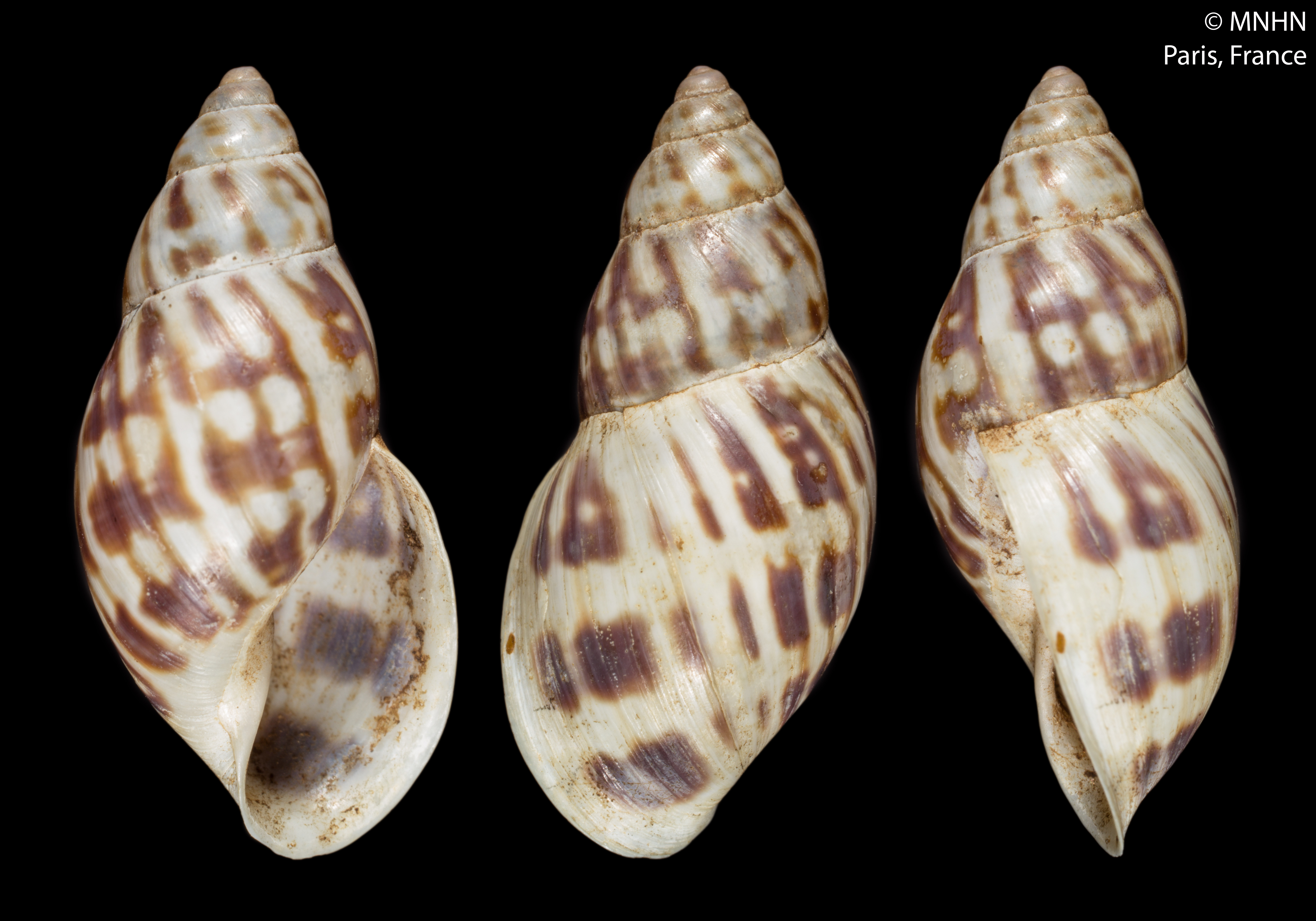
Drymaeus sargi

- Drymaeus sargi Crosse & P.Fischer, 1875
- Drymaeus championi E.von Martens, 1893
- Drymaeus lilacinus Reeve, 1849
- Drymaeus semipellucidus Tristram, 1861
- Drymaeus moricandi L.Pfeiffer, 1847
- Drymaeus tripictus Albers, 1857
- Drymaeus emeus Say, 1829
- Drymaeus castus L.Pfeiffer, 1847
- Drymaeus aurifluus L.Pfeiffer, 1857
- Drymaeus hepatostomus L.Pfeiffer, 1861
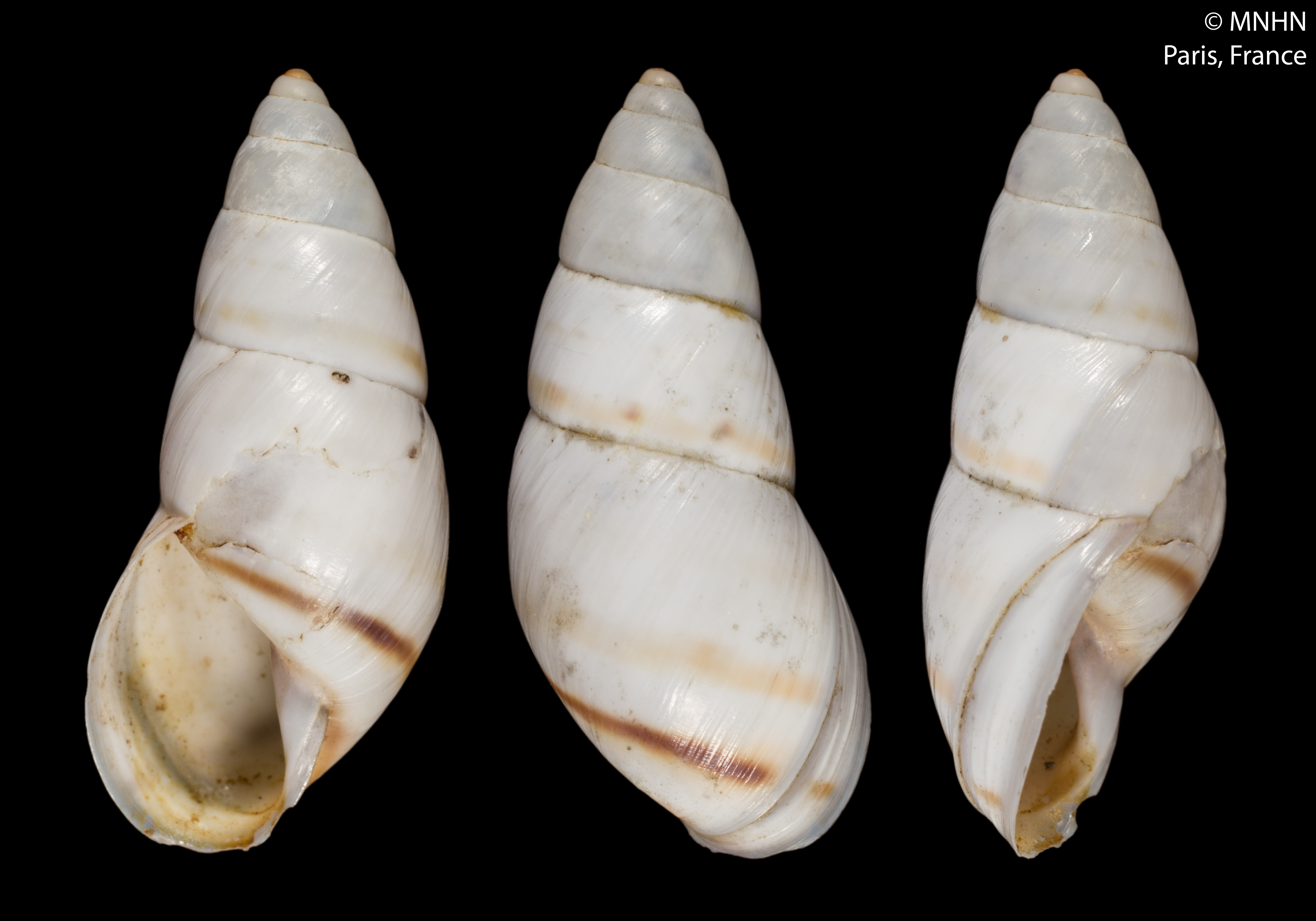
- Drymaeus tropicalis
  Drymaeus lattrei L.Pfeiffer, 1846
- Drymaeus discrepans G.B.Sowerby I, 1833
- Drymaeus zhorquinensis Angas, 1879
- Drymaeus tropicalis Morelet, 1849
- Drymaeus chiapasensis L.Pfeiffer, 1866
- Drymaeus liliaceus A.Férussac, 1832
- Drymaeus translucens Broderip, 1832
- Drymaeus hondurasanus L.Pfeiffer, 1846
- Drymaeus colombianus I.Lea, 1838
- Drymaeus sulcosus L.Pfeiffer, 1841
- Drymaeus trigonostomus Jonas, 1844
- Drymaeus serperastrum Say, 1829
- Drymaeus ghiesbreghti L.Pfeiffer, 1866
- Drymaeus jonasi L.Pfeiffer, 1846
- Drymaeus shattucki Bequaert & Clench, 1931
- Drymaeus sulphureus L.Pfeiffer, 1857
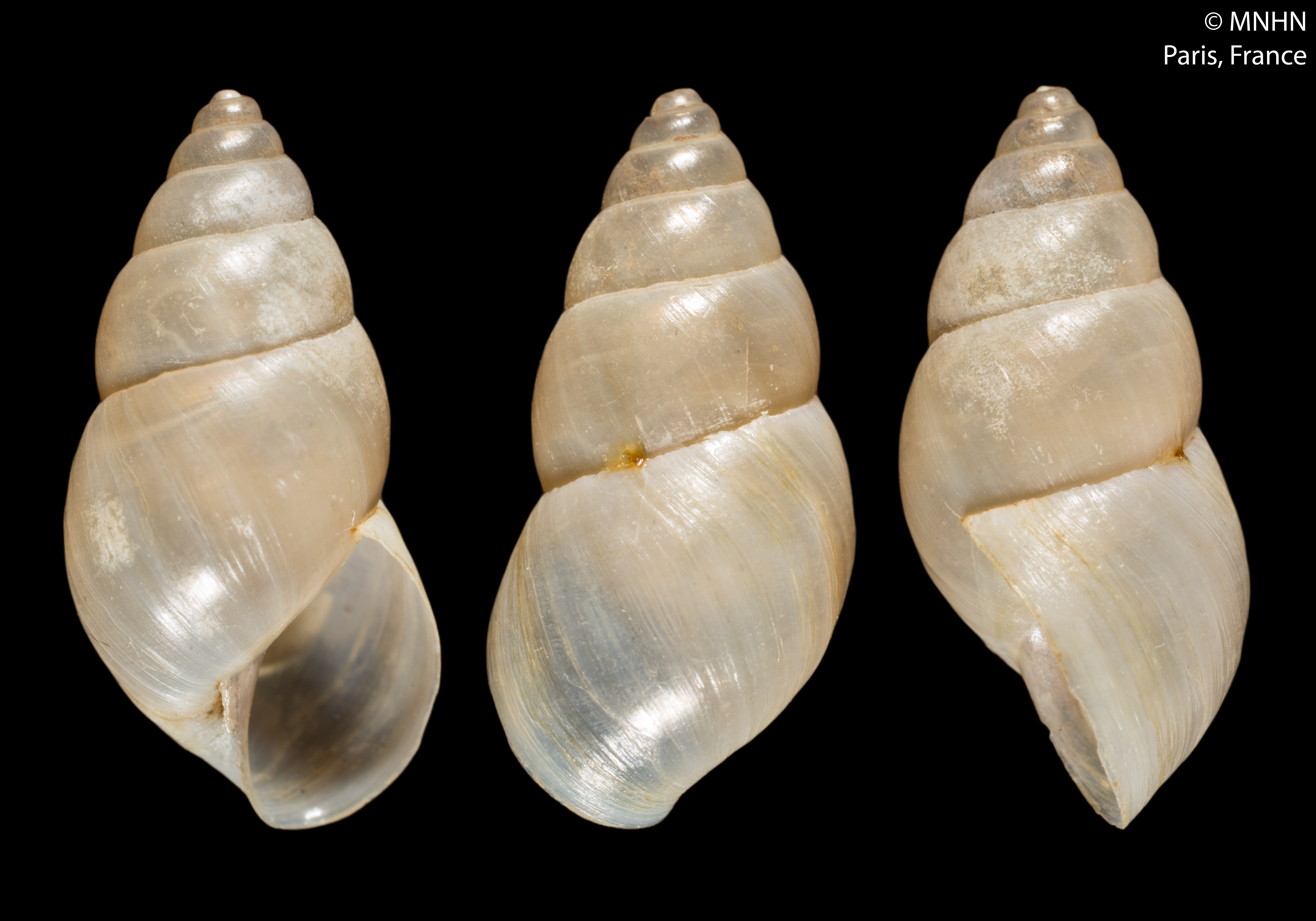
  Bulimulus unicolor
- Bulimulus corneus G.B.Sowerby I, 1833
- Bulimulus unicolor G.B.Sowerby I, 1833
- Bulimulus istapensis Crosse & Fischer, 1873
- Bulimulus dysoni L.Pfeiffer, 1846
- Bulimulus coriaceus L.Pfeiffer, 1857
- Bulimulus inermis Morelet, 1851
- Antidrymaeus sulphureus L.Pfeiffer, 1857

Achatinidae

- Lamellaxis martensi L.Pfeiffer, 1857
- Lamellaxis guatemalensis Crosse & P.Fischer, 1877
- Lamellaxis micrus d'Orbigny, 1835
- Lamellaxis mexicanus L.Pfeiffer, 1866
- Lamellaxis gracilis T.Hutton, 1834
- Lamellaxis filicostatus Strebel, 1882
- Leptopeas bocourtianum Crosse & P.Fischer, 1869
- Leptopeas gladiolus Crosse & P.Fischer, 1877
- Leptopeas semistriatus Morelet, 1851
- Leptopeas guatemalense Strebel, 1882
- Leptinaria livingstonensis Hinkley, 1920
- Leptinaria elisae Tristram, 1861
- Leptinaria stolli E.von Martens, 1898
- Leptinaria unilamellata d'Orbigny, 1838
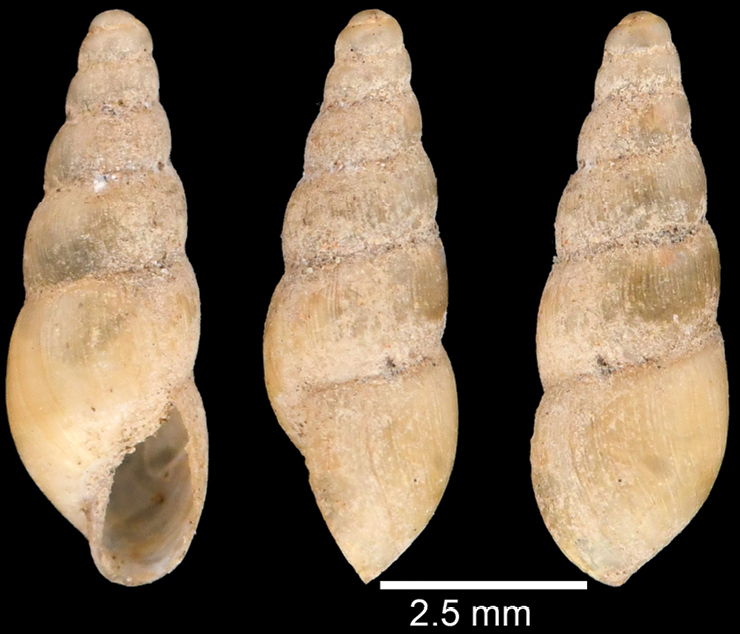
  Allopeas gracile
- Opeas beckiana L.Pfeiffer, 1846
- Opeas hannense Rang, 1831
- Opeas gladiolus Crosse & Fischer, 1877
- Allopeas gracile T.Hutton, 1834
- Allopeas micra d'Orbigny, 1835
- Paropeas achatinaceum L.Pfeiffer, 1846
- Rumina decollata Linnaeus, 1758
- Subulina octona Bruguière, 1789
- Beckianum beckianum L.Pfeiffer, 1846

Helicinidae

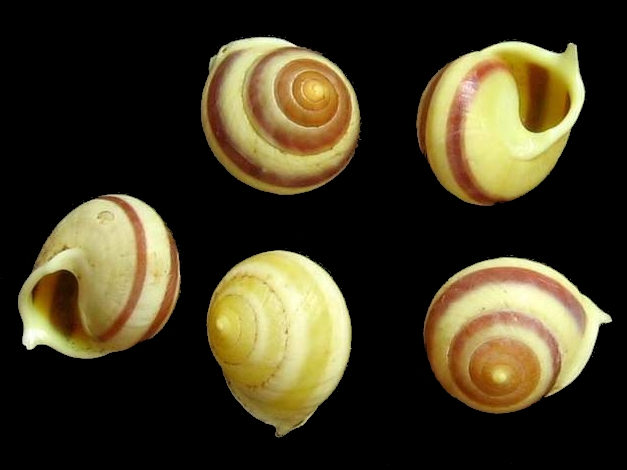
Helicina rostrata

- Helicina rostrata Morelet, 1851
- Helicina turbinata L.Pfeiffer, 1848
- Helicina punctisulcata E.von Martens, 1890
- Helicina ghiesbreghti L.Pfeiffer, 1856
- Helicina pterophora Sykes, 1902
- Helicina sowerbyana L.Pfeiffer, 1849
- Helicina trossula Morelet, 1849
- Helicina oaxacana Pilsbry, 1920
- Helicina arenicola Morelet, 1849
- Helicina fragilis Morelet, 1851
- Helicina tenuis L.Pfeiffer, 1849
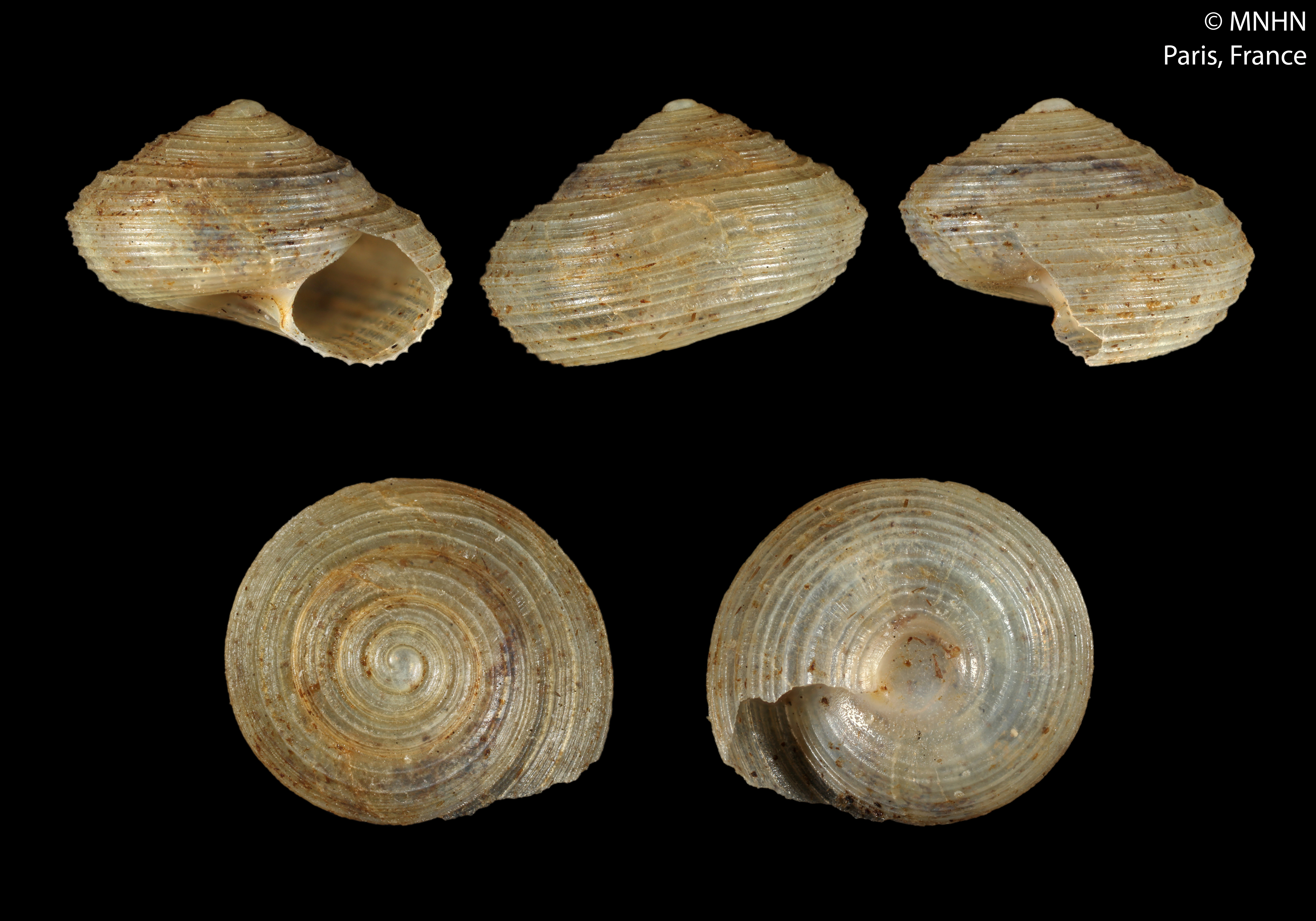
  Lucidella lirata
- Helicina flavida Menke, 1828
- Helicina amoena L.Pfeiffer, 1849
- Helicina oweniana L.Pfeiffer, 1849
- Lucidella lirata L.Pfeiffer, 1847
- Lucidella undulata L.Pfeiffer, 1861
- Schasicheila hinkleyi Pilsbry, 1920
- Schasicheila minuscula L.Pfeiffer, 1859
- Schasicheila pannucea Morelet, 1849
- Sturanya gallina Gassies, 1870

Eucalodiidae

- Eucalodium walpoleanum Crosse & P.Fischer, 1872
- Eucalodium decollatum Nyst, 1841
- Eucalodium cervinum F.G.Thompson, 2014
- Eucalodium huehuetenangoense F.G.Thompson, 2014
- Eucalodium mexicanum L.Pfeiffer, 1860
- Eucalodium smithi F.G.Thompson, 2014
- Eucalodium blandianum Crosse & P.Fischer, 1868
- Eucalodium guatemalense Bartsch, 1906
- Eucalodium speciosum Dunker, 1844

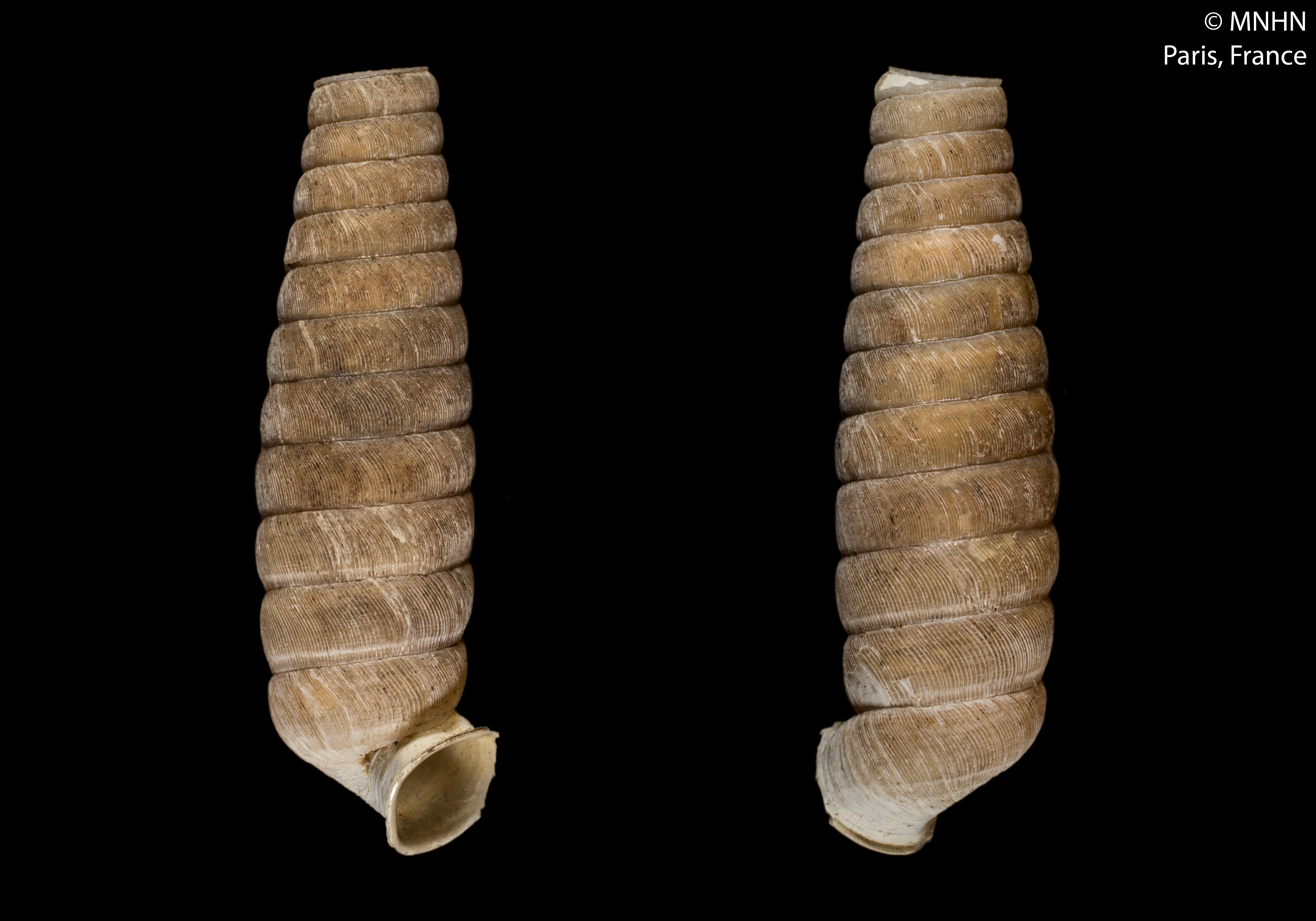
Coelocentrum fistulare

- Eucalodium australe F.G.Thompson, 1963
- Coelocentrum gigas E.von Martens, 1897
- Coelocentrum fistulare Morelet, 1849
- Coelocentrum championi E.von Martens, 1897
- Coelocentrum badium D.S.Dourson, Caldwell & J.A.Dourson, 2018
- Coelocentrum clathratum E.von Martens, 1887
- Coelocentrum pittieri Bartsch, 1906
- Coelocentrum anomalum Strebel, 1880
- Coelocentrum dispar Pilsbry, 1902
- Coelocentrum turris L.Pfeiffer, 1856

Thysanophoridae

- Thysanophora impura L.Pfeiffer, 1866
- Thysanophora conspurcatella Morelet, 1851
- Thysanophora incrustata Poey, 1852
- Lyroconus rhoadsi Pilsbry, 1920
- Lyroconus caecoides Tate, 1870
- Lyroconus plagioptycha Shuttleworth, 1854
- Setidiscus intonsus Pilsbry, 1891
- Setidiscus impurus L.Pfeiffer, 1866
- Microconus rufus F.G.Thompson, 1958
- Microconus wilhelmi L.Pfeiffer, 1866
- Itzamna sigmoides Morelet, 1851

Annulariidae

- Halotudora gruneri L.Pfeiffer, 1846
- Halotudora gaigei Bequaert & Clench, 1931
- Halotudora kuesteri L.Pfeiffer, 1852
- Gouldipoma rubicundum Morelet, 1849
- Gouldipoma coltrorum Watters, 2014
- Diplopoma rigidulum Morelet, 1851
- Diplopoma osberti Tristram, 1861
- Parachondrops acerbulus Morelet, 1851
- Parachondria cordovana L.Pfeiffer, 1857

Neocyclotidae

- Amphicyclotus ponderosus L.Pfeiffer, 1853
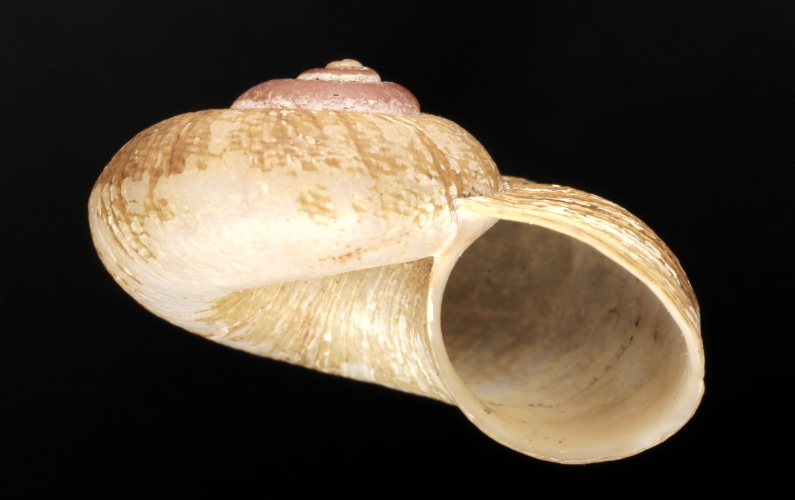
  Amphicyclotus maleri
- Amphicyclotus texturatus G.B.Sowerby I, 1850
- Amphicyclotus maleri Crosse & P.Fischer, 1883
- Amphicyclotus boucardi L.Pfeiffer, 1857
- Amphicyclotulus beauianus Petit de la Saussaye, 1853
- Neocyclotus dysoni L.Pfeiffer, 1851
- Neocyclotus bisinuatus E.von Martens, 1864
- Neocyclotus simplicostus F.G.Thompson, 1969
- Incidostoma confusum Sykes, 1901

Orthalicidae

- Orthalicus princeps Broderip, 1833
- Orthalicus ponderosus Strebel, 1882
- Orthalicus pulchellus Spix, 1827
- Orthalicus ferussaci E.von Martens, 1863
- Orthalicus livens Shuttleworth, 1856
- Orthalicus decolor Strebel, 1882
- Orthalicus melanocheilus Valenciennes, 1827
- Orthalicus undatus Bruguière, 1789

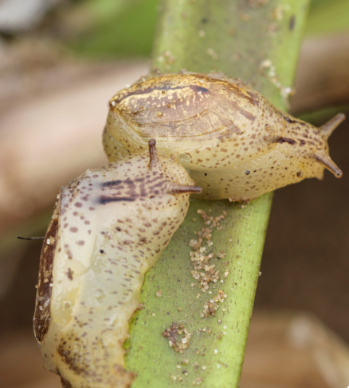
Omalonyx unguis

Succineidae

- Succinea recisa Morelet, 1851
- Succinea virgata E.von Martens, 1865
- Succinea luteola A.Gould, 1848
- Succinea hortulana Morelet, 1851
- Succinea carmenensis P.Fischer & Crosse, 1878
- Succinea guatemalensis Morelet, 1849
- Succinea brevis Dunker, 1850
- Omalonyx unguis d'Orbigny, 1836

Euconulidae

- Habroconus elegantulus Pilsbry, 1920
- Habroconus championi E.von Martens, 1892
- Habroconus trochulinus Morelet, 1851
- Habroconus elegans Strebel, 1880
- Habroconus pittieri E.von Martens, 1892
- Guppya gundlachii L.Pfeiffer, 1840
- Euconulus trochulus Reinhardt, 1883

Urocoptidae

- Brachypodella subtilis Morelet, 1849
- Brachypodella morini Morelet, 1849
- Brachypodella speluncae Morelet, 1852
- Microceramus concisus Morelet, 1849
- Microceramus mexicanus E.von Martens, 1897
- Gongylostoma lirata L.Pfeiffer, 1863

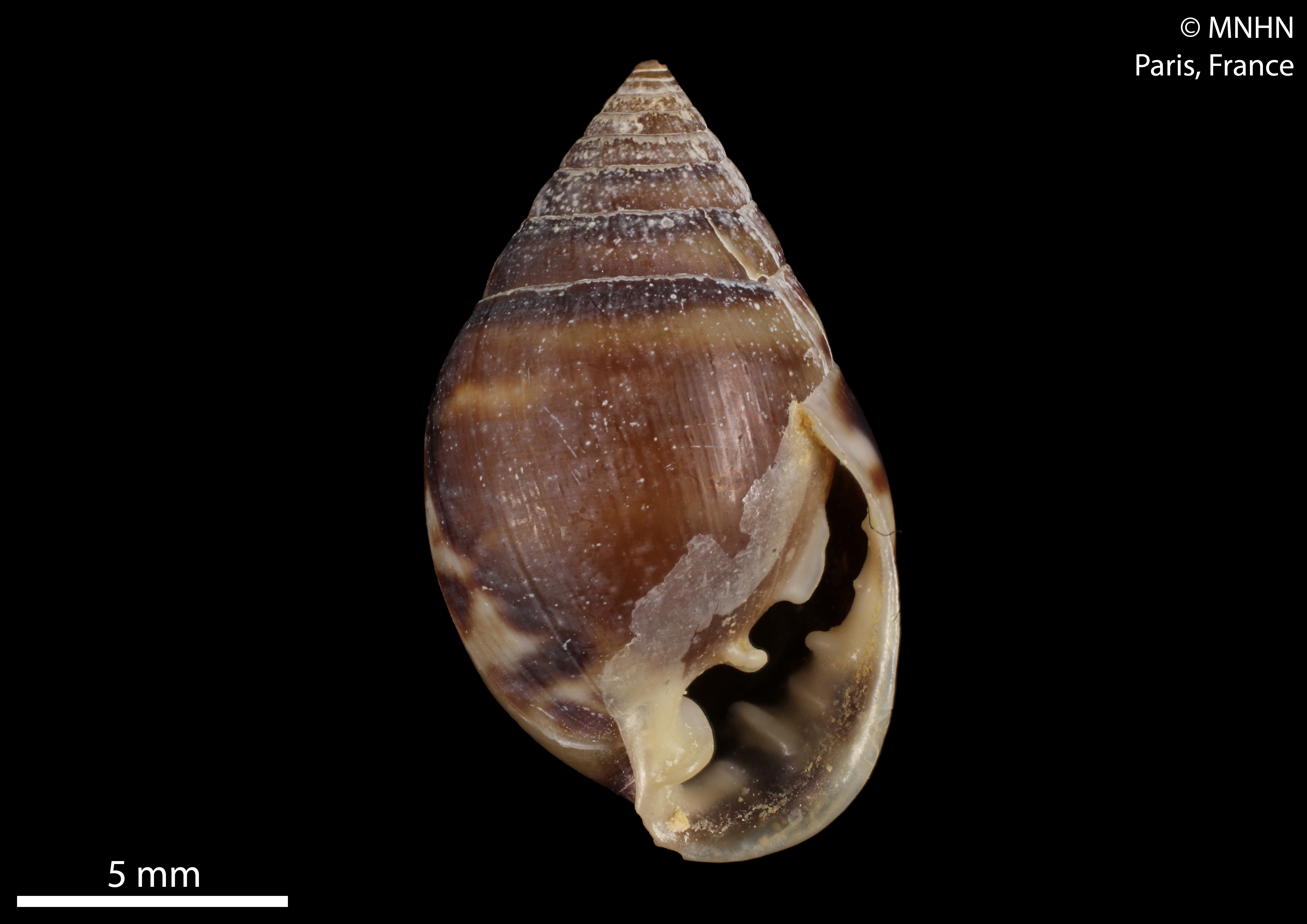
Pythia pyramidata

Ellobiidae

- Carychium costaricanum E.von Martens, 1898
- Carychium mexicanum Pilsbry, 1891
- Carychium exile H.C.Lea, 1842
- Pythia pyramidata Reeve, 1842
- Melampus coffea Linnaeus, 1758

Megalomastomatidae

- Tomocyclus simulacrum Morelet, 1849
- Tomocyclus gealei Crosse & P.Fischer, 1872
- Tomocyclus guatemalensis L.Pfeiffer, 1851
- Aperostoma translucidum G.B.Sowerby I, 1843

Scolodontidae

- Miradiscops puncticipitis Pilsbry, 1926
- Miradiscops maya Pilsbry, 1920
- Drepanostomella stolli E.von Martens, 1892
- Happia flora Reeve, 1852

Trichodiscinidae

- Trichodiscina suturalis L.Pfeiffer, 1846
- Trichodiscina coactiliata Deshayes, 1839
- Trichodiscina hinkleyi Pilsbry, 1920
- Miraverellia sargi Crosse & P.Fischer, 1872

Gastrocoptidae

- Gastrocopta pentodon Say, 1822
- Gastrocopta servilis A.Gould, 1843
- Gastrocopta pellucida L.Pfeiffer, 1841
- Gastrocopta prototypus Pilsbry, 1899

Punctidae

- Thysanophora textilis Pilsbry, 1920
- Thysanophora jaliscoensis Pilsbry, 1926
- Punctum burringtoni Pilsbry, 1930
- Punctum baschi F.G.Thompson, 1962

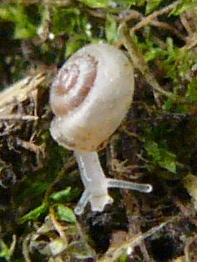
Vallonia pulchella

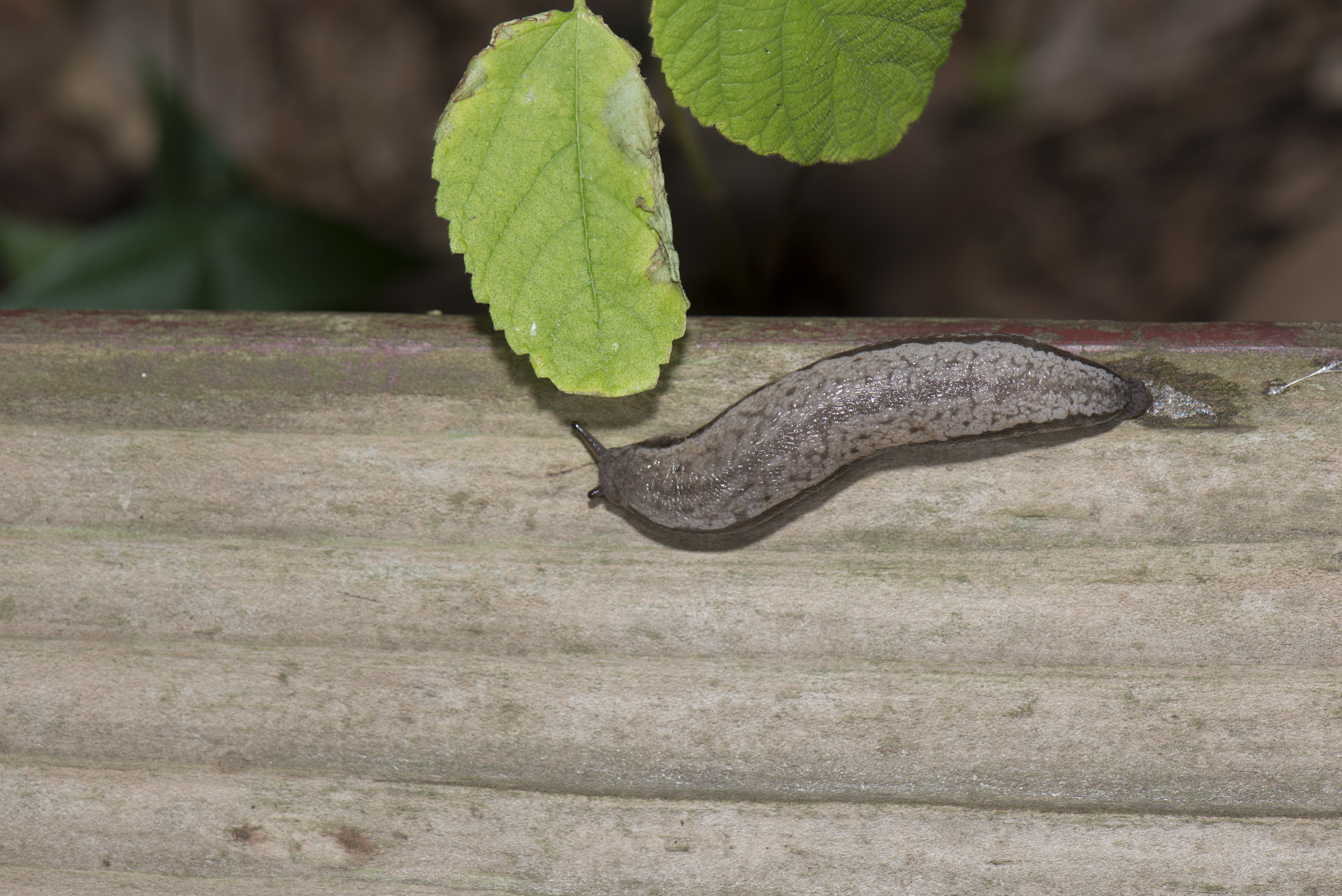
Meghimatium bilineatum

Valloniidae

- Pupisoma dioscoricola C.B.Adams, 1845
- Pupisoma mediamericanum Pilsbry, 1920
- Pupisoma macneilli G.H.Clapp, 1918
- Vallonia pulchella O.F.Müller, 1774

Xanthonychidae

- Lysinoe ghiesbreghti Nyst, 1841
- Lysinoe eximia L.Pfeiffer, 1844
- Lysinoe sebastiana Dall, 1897
- Leptarionta trigonostoma L.Pfeiffer, 1844

Philomycidae

- Pallifera costaricensis Mörch, 1858
- Pallifera fosteri F.C.Baker, 1939
- Meghimatium bilineatum W.H.Benson, 1842

Limacidae

- Limacus flavus Linnaeus, 1758
- Ambigolimax valentianus A.Férussac, 1821
- Ambigolimax parvipenis Hutchinson, Reise & Schlitt, 2022

Vertiginidae

- Bothriopupa breviconus Pilsbry, 1917
- Bothriopupa leucodon Morelet, 1851
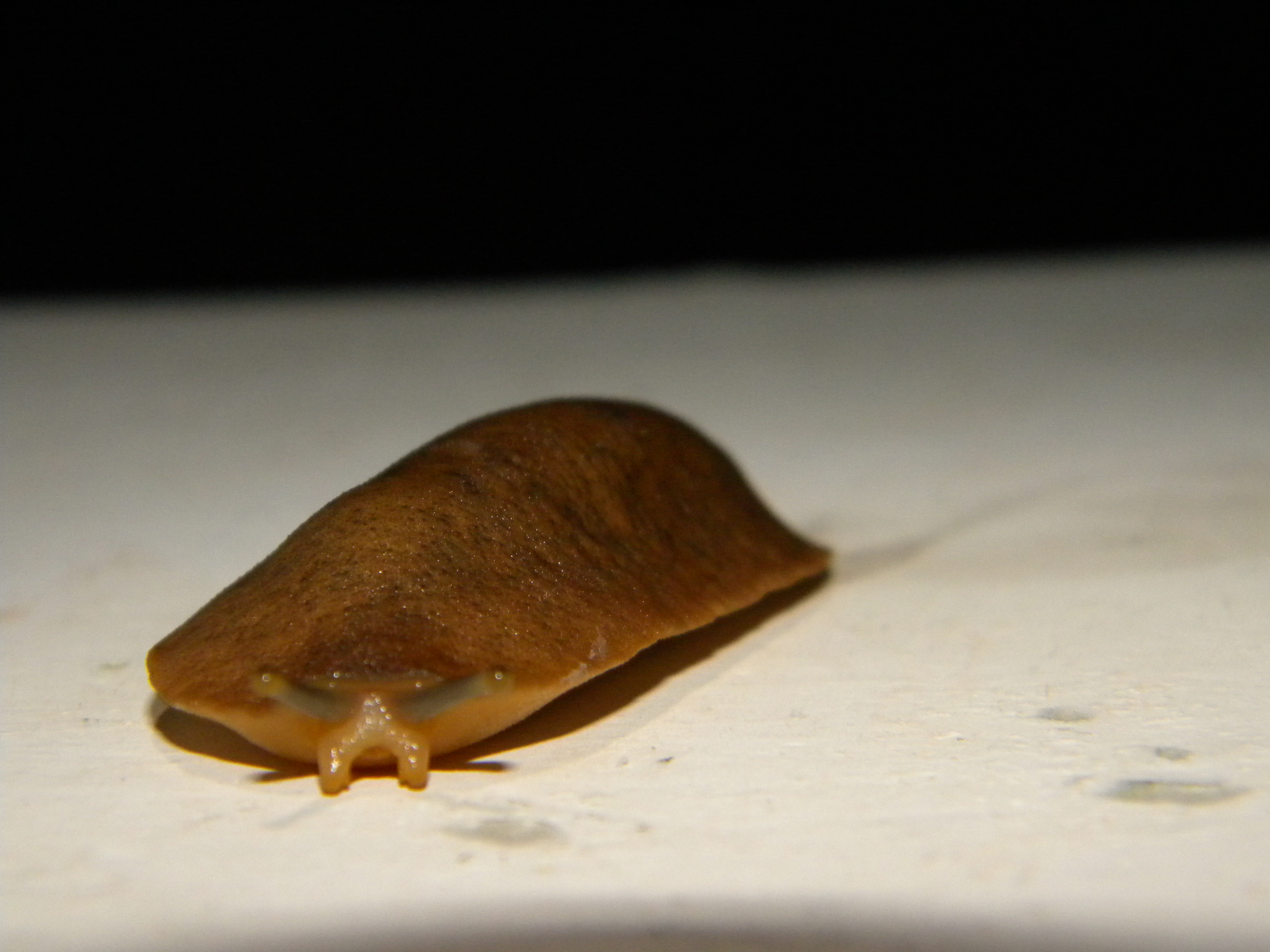
  Sarasinula plebeia
- Sterkia eyriesii Drouët, 1859

Veronicellidae

- Sarasinula plebeia P.Fischer, 1868
- Leidyula moreleti Crosse & P.Fischer, 1872
- Diplosolenodes occidentalis Guilding, 1824

Sagdidae

- Xenodiscula taintori Goodrich & Schalie, 1937
- Xenodiscula venezuelensis Pilsbry, 1919
- Lacteoluna selenina A.Gould, 1848

Ferussaciidae

- Karolus consobrinus d'Orbigny, 1841

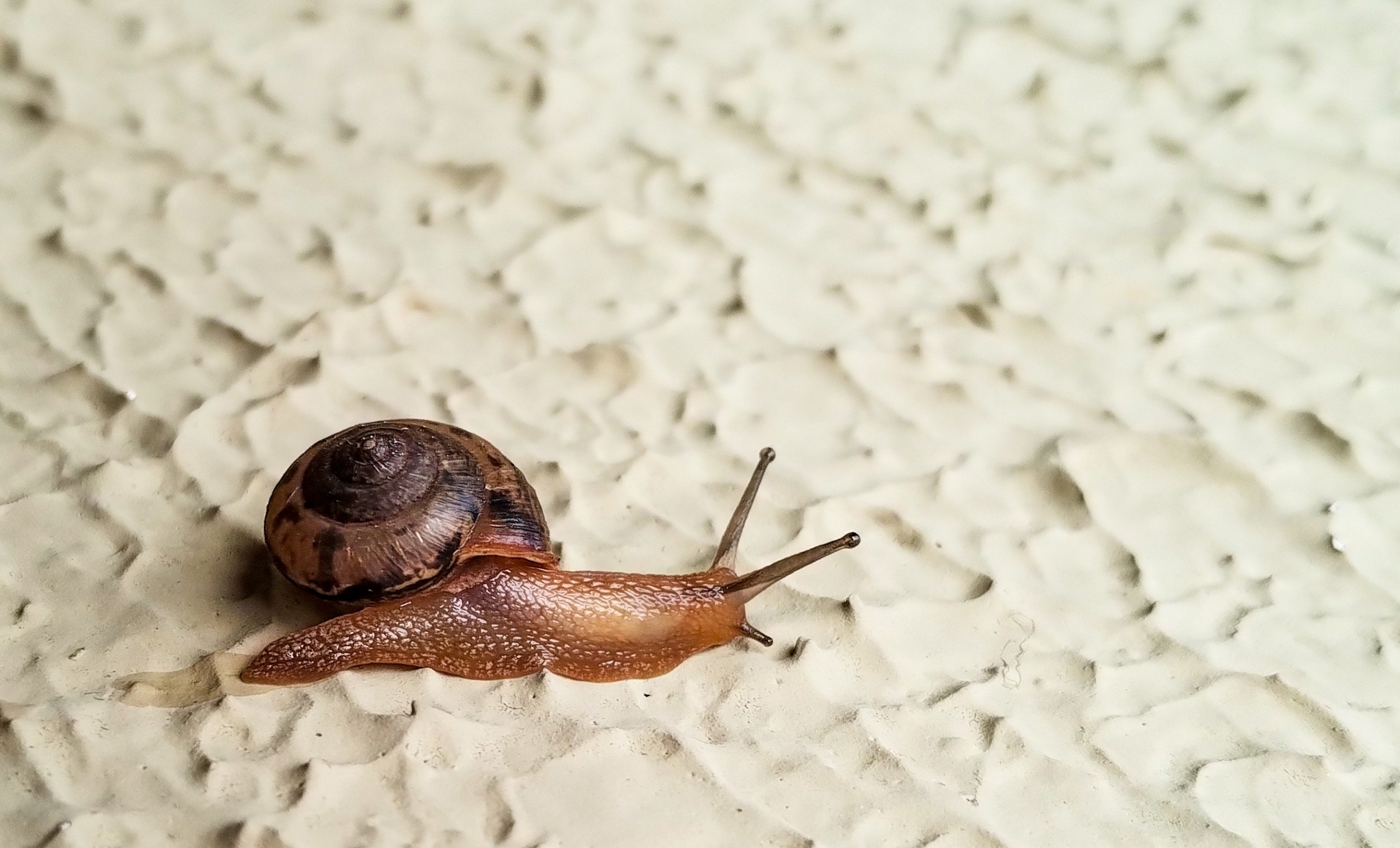
Bradybaena similaris

- Geostilbia aperta Swainson, 1840

Camaenidae

- Bradybaena similaris A.Férussac, 1822
- Chloraea puella Reeve, 1853

Epirobiidae

- Epirobia polygyrella E.von Martens, 1876
- Epirobia polygyra L.Pfeiffer, 1856

Polygyridae

- Polygyra yucatanea Morelet, 1849
- Praticolella griseola L.Pfeiffer, 1841

Charopidae

- Rotadiscus saqui D.S.Dourson, Caldwell & J.A.Dourson, 2018
- Rotadiscus hermanni L.Pfeiffer, 1866

Strobilopsidae

- Strobilops salvini Tristram, 1863
- Strobilops strebeli L.Pfeiffer, 1861

Labyrinthidae

- Labyrinthus otis Lightfoot, 1786
- Labyrinthus uncigerus Petit de la Saussaye, 1838

Helicodiscidae

- Chanomphalus pilsbryi H.B.Baker, 1922

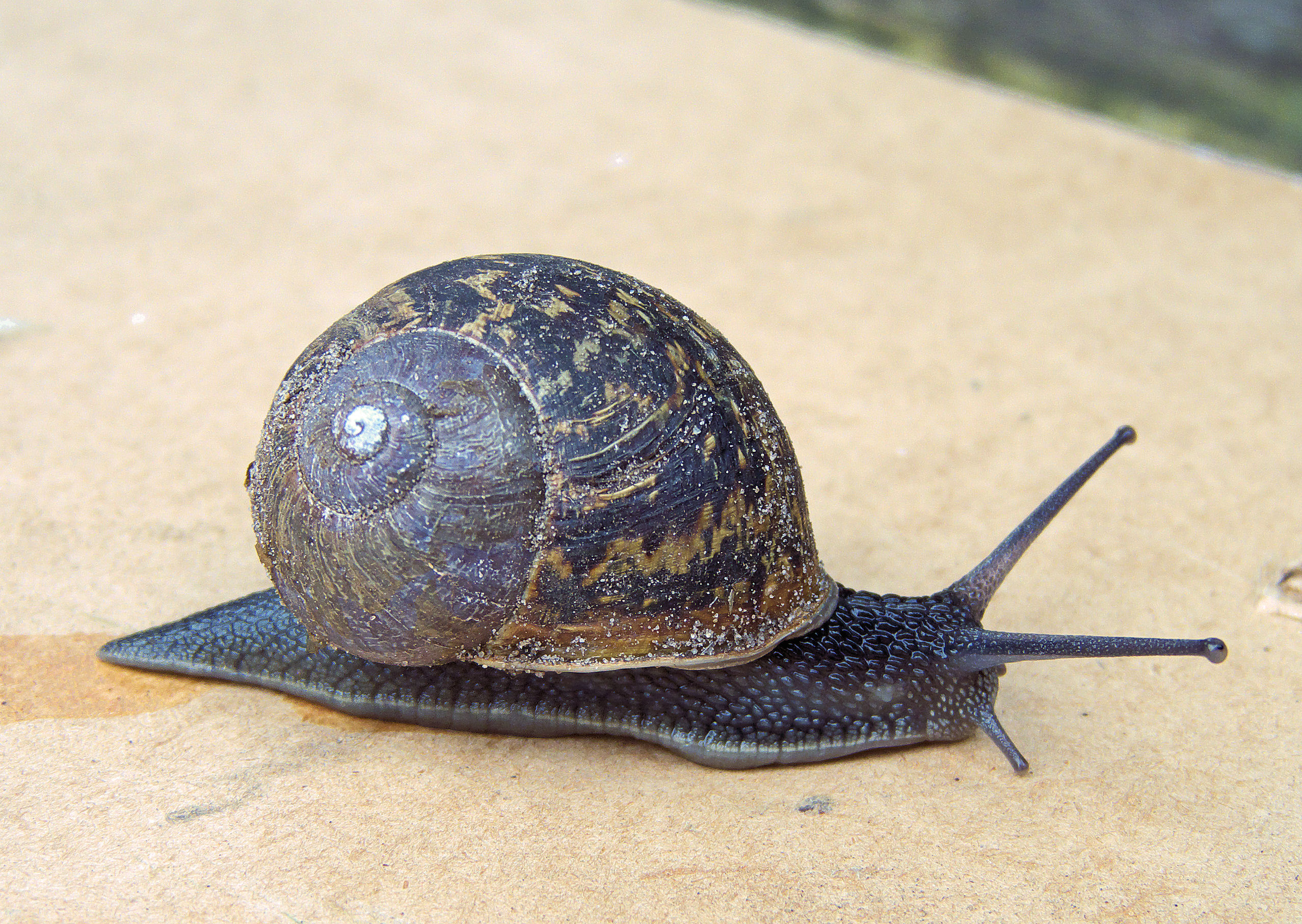
Cornu aspersum

- Lucilla singleyana Pilsbry, 1889

Helicidae

- Cornu aspersum O.F.Müller, 1774

Helicarionidae

- Ovachlamys fulgens Gude, 1900

Hydrocenidae

- Hydrocena cattaroensis L.Pfeiffer, 1841

Bothriembryontidae

- Callistocharis malleatus Jay, 1842

Diplommatinidae

- Adelopoma stolli E.von Martens, 1890

Agriolimacidae

- Deroceras laeve O.F.Müller, 1774
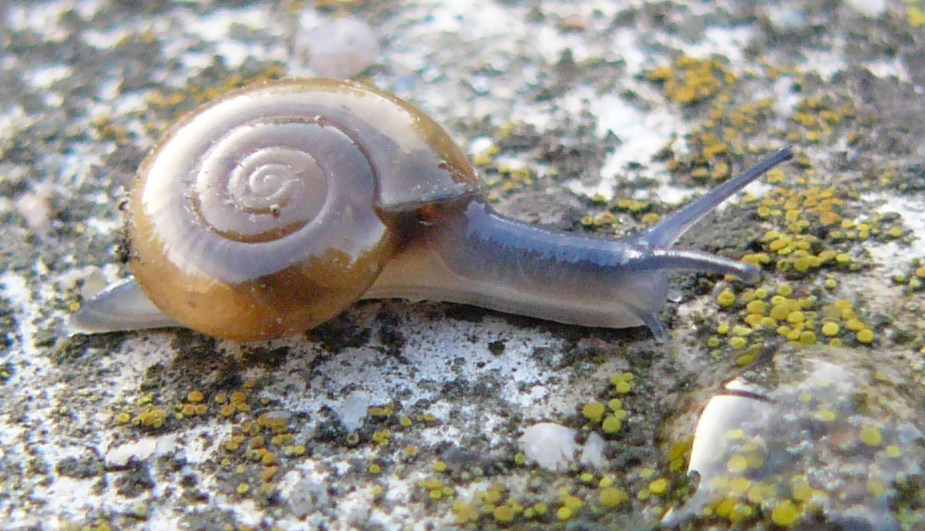
  Oxychilus draparnaudi

Oxychilidae

- Oxychilus draparnaudi H.Beck, 1837

Pristilomatidae

- Hawaiia minuscula A.Binney, 1841

Streptaxidae

- Huttonella bicolor T.Hutton, 1834

Solaropsidae

- Caracolus marginella Gmelin, 1791

Simpulopsidae

- Simpulopsis simula Morelet, 1851

== See also ==
Lists of molluscs of surrounding countries:

- List of non-marine molluscs of Mexico, Wildlife of Mexico
- List of non-marine molluscs of Belize, Fauna of Belize
- List of non-marine molluscs of Honduras, Wildlife of Honduras
- Wildlife of El Salvador
