= List of non-marine molluscs of Belize =

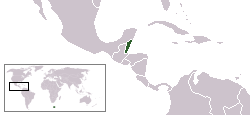
Location of Belize

The non-marine molluscs of Belize are a part of the molluscan fauna of Belize (wildlife of Belize). A number of species of non-marine molluscs are found in the wild in Belize.

== Land gastropods ==
Cyclophoridae

- Neocyclotus dysoni (Pfeiffer 1849)

Helicinidae

- Lucidella lirata (Pfeiffer 1847)
- Helicina arenicola (Morelet 1849)
- Helicina oweniana (Pfeiffer 1849)
- Helicina amoena (Pfeiffer 1849)
- Pyrgodomus microdinus (Morelet 1851)

Sagdidae

- Xenodiscula taintori (Goodrich & Van der Schalie 1973)

Subulinidae

- Beckianum beckianum (Pfeiffer 1846)

Helicarionidae

- Guppya gundlachi (Pfeiffer 1846)

Orthalicidae

- Orthalicus princeps (Broderip 1833)
- Bulimulus unicolor (Sowerby 1833)
- Drymaeus sulfureus (Pfeiffer 1856)

Zonitidae

- Hawaiia minuscula (A. Binney 1840)

Urocoptidae

- Brachypodella speluncae (Morelet 1852)
- Microceramus concisus (Morelet 1849)

Eucalodiidae

- Eucalodium belizensis Thompson & Dourson, 2013

Helicodiscidae

- Chanomphalus pilsbryi (H.B. Baker 1927)

Carychiidae

- Carychium belizeense Jochum & Weigand in Jochum et al., 2017

Thysanophoridae

- Thysanophora plagioptycha (Shuttleworth 1854)

Pupillidae

- Sterkia eyriesii (Drouet 1859)

Pomatiidae

- Chondropoma rubicundum (Morelet 1849)

Spiraxidae

- Euglandina ghiesbreghti (Pfeiffer 1846)

Vertiginidae

- Gastrocopta pentodon (Say 1822)

Helminthoglyptidae

- Trichodiscina coactiliata (Fèrussac 1838)

== See also ==
- List of marine molluscs of Belize
- List of non-marine molluscs of Mexico
- List of non-marine molluscs of Guatemala
