= List of non-marine molluscs of Honduras =

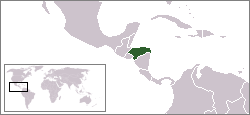
Location of Honduras

The non-marine molluscs of Honduras are a part of the molluscan wildlife of Honduras. A number of species of non-marine molluscs are found in the wild in Honduras.

There were no molluscs listed in the 2010 IUCN Red List of Threatened Species in Honduras, however, 4 species of freshwater snails and 2 species of freshwater bivalves were listed in the 2013 Red List.

== Freshwater gastropods ==
Ampullariidae

- Pomacea auriformis (Reeve, 1856)
- Pomacea flagellata dysoni (Hanley, 1854)

Pachychilidae

- Pachychilus oerstedi oerstedi Mörch, 1860 and Pachychilus oerstedi planensis (Lea, 1858)
- Pachychilus obeliscus obeliscus (Reeve, 1861)

Hydrobiidae

- Mesobia pristina Thompson & Hershler, 1991

Lymnaeidae

- Pseudosuccinea columella (Say, 1817) - introduced

Planorbidae

- Biomphalaria havanensis (Pfeiffer, 1839)

Physidae

- Mayabina obtusa Clessin, 1885

== Land gastropods ==
Helicinidae

- Helicina amoena Pfeiffer, 1849
- Helicina bocourti Crosse & Fischer, 1869
- Helicina sanguinea Pfeiffer, 1849
- Helicina flavida Menke, 1828
- Helicina diaphana Pfeiffer, 1852
- Helicina hondurana Richards, 1938
- Helicina rostrata denticulata Pfeiffer, 1955
- Helicina tenuis Pfeiffer, 1849
- Alcadia exigua (Pfeiffer, 1849)
- Lucidella lirata (Pfeiffer, 1847)
- Lucidella midyetti Richards, 1938
- Lucidella pilsbryi pilsbryi Clapp, 1914 and Lucidella pilsbryi indecora Pilsbry, 1930
- Pyrgodomus fischeri Pilsbry, 1930
- Pyrgodomus micordinus (Morelet, 1851) - probably
- Pyrgodomus simpsoni (Ancey, 1886)

Neocyclotidae

- Neocyclotus dysoni dysoni (Pfeiffer, 1851) and Neocyclotus dysoni dyeri (Bartsch & Morrison, 1942) and Neocyclotus dysoni ruatanensus (Bartsch & Morrison, 1942)
- Amphicyclotus texturatus goldfussi (Boettger, 1892)

Pomatiidae

- Chondropoma rubicundum (Morelet, 1849)
- Choanopoma andrewsae (Ancey, 1886)
- Chondropoma turritum Pfeiffer, 1853 - doubtful
- Cistula pleurophorum (Pfeiffer, 1852) - doubtful

Subulinidae

- Beckianum beckianum (L. Pfeiffer, 1846)

Spiraxidae

- Streptostyla sp.

== Bivalvia ==
Sphaeriidae

- Eupera cubensis Prime, 1865

Mycetopodidae

- Anodontites trigonus Spix & Wagner, 1827

== See also ==
Lists of molluscs of surrounding countries:

- List of non-marine molluscs of Guatemala
- List of non-marine molluscs of Nicaragua
