= List of non-marine molluscs of Nicaragua =

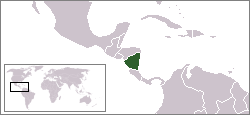
Location of Nicaragua

The non-marine molluscs of Nicaragua are a part of the molluscan wildlife of Nicaragua. A number of species of non-marine molluscs are found in the wild in Nicaragua.

There are ?? species of gastropods (?? species of freshwater gastropods, at least 79 species of land gastropods) and ?? species of freshwater bivalves living in the wild.

A field study by Pérez & Aburto (2008) has shown that the primary forest had highest biodiversity of molluscs in comparison to other land use types.

== Land gastropods ==
Pomatiidae

- Chondropoma callipeplum Solem, 1961

Cyclophoridae

- Adelopoma stolli Martens, 1890

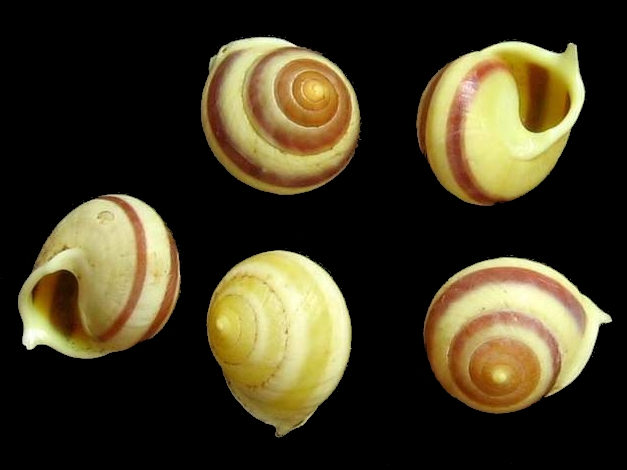
Five shells of Helicina rostrata

Helicinidae

- Helicina rostrata Morelet, 1851
- Helicina tenuis (Pfeiffer, 1847)
- Lucidella lirata (Pfeiffer, 1847)

Neocyclotidae

- Neocyclotus dysoni, subspecies Neocyclotus dysoni nicaraguense Bartsch & Morrison, 1942 is endemic subspecies of Nicaragua

Strobilopsidae

- Strobilops sp. – an endemic species of the genus Strobilops

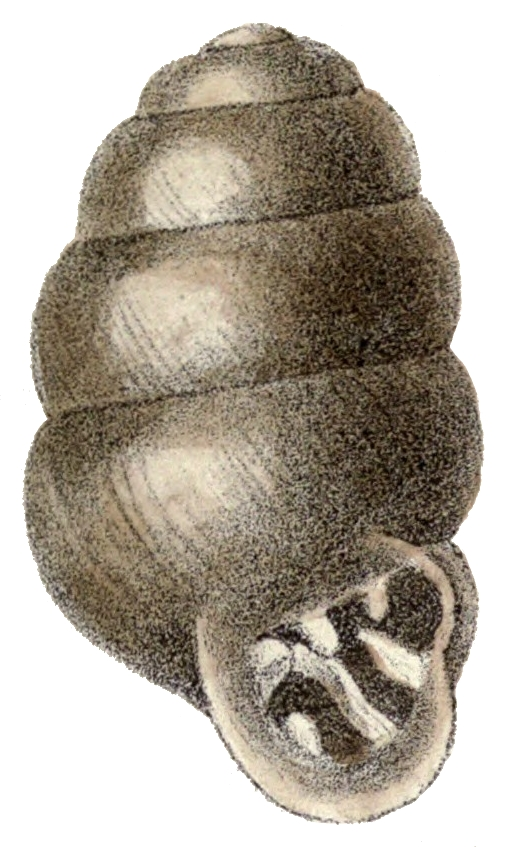
Drawing of the shell of Vertigo milium

Vertiginidae

- Bothriopupa conoidea (Newcomb, 1853)
- Bothriopupa tenuidens (C. B. Adams, 1845)
- Pupisoma dioscoricola (C. B. Adams, 1845)
- Pupisoma minus Pilsbry, 1920
- Pupisoma mediomericana
- Sterkia antillensis Pilsbry, 1920
- Vertigo milium (Gould, 1840)

Pupillidae

- Gastrocopta geminidens (Pilsbry, 1917)
- Gastrocopta gularis Thompson & López, 1996
- Gastrocopta servilis (Gould, 1843)
- Gastrocopta pellucida (Pfeiffer, 1841)
- Gastrocopta pentodon (Say, 1821)

Succineidae

- Succinea guatemalensis Morelet, 1849
- Succinea recisa (Morelet, 1851)

Ferussaciidae

- Caeciliodes consobrinus (Orbigny, 1849) or Cecilioides consobrinus Orbigny, 1855
- Cecilioides gundlachi (Pfeiffer, 1850)

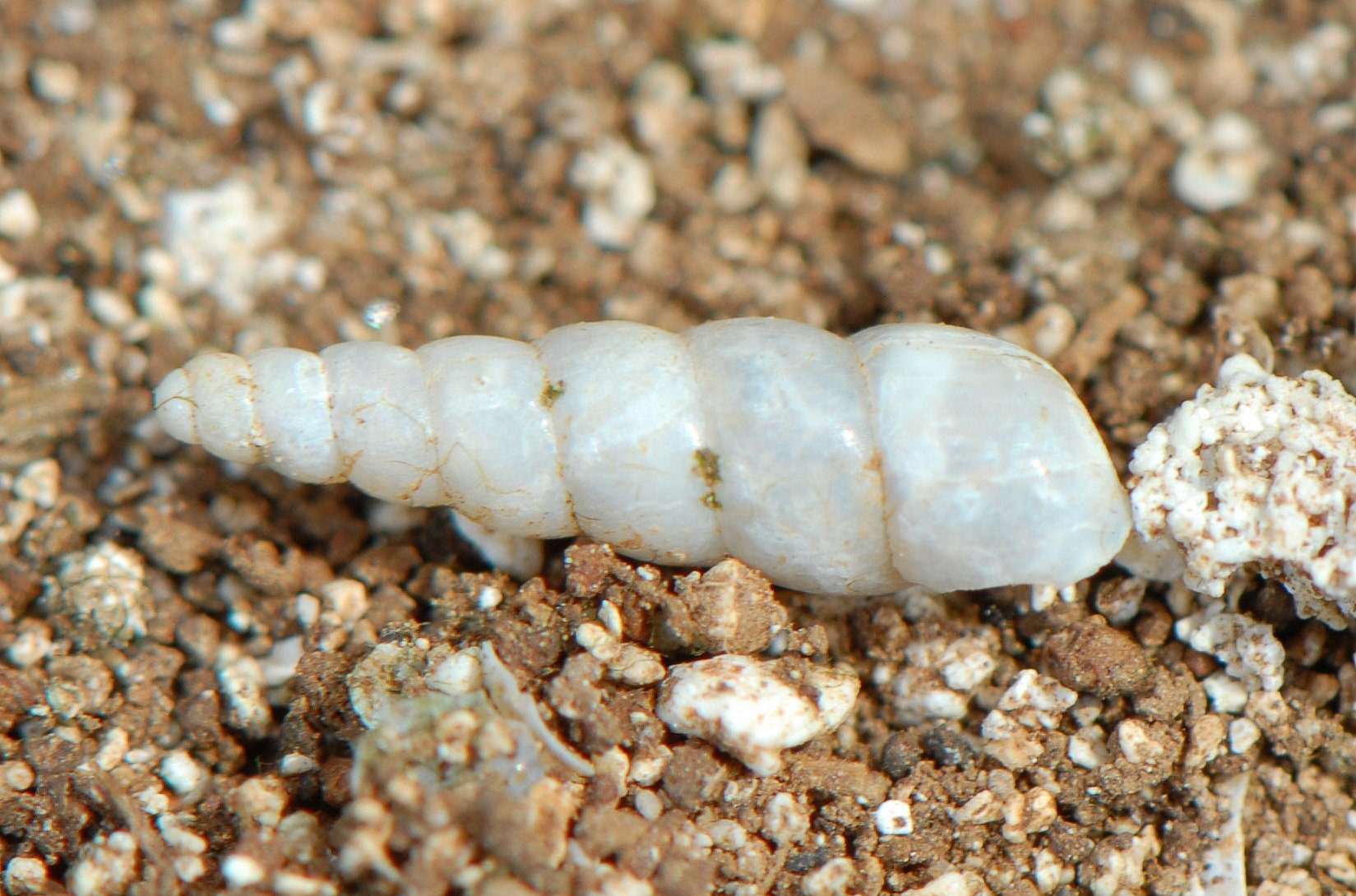
A shell of Subulina octona

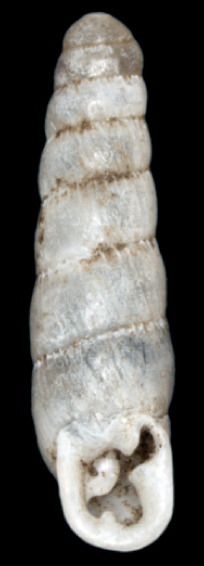
A shell of Huttonella bicolor

Subulinidae

- Beckianum beckianum (Pfeiffer, 1846)
- Beckianum sinistrum (Martens, 1898) – Near Threatened
- Beckianum sp. – endemic
- Lamellaxis gracilis (Hutton, 1834)
- Lamellaxis micra (Orbigny, 1835)
- Leptinaria guatemalensis (Crosse & Fischer, 1877)
- Leptinaria insignis (Smith, 1898)
- Leptinaria interstriata (Tate, 1870)
- Leptinaria lamellata (Potiez & Michaud, 1838)
- Leptinaria strebeliana Pilsbry, 1907
- Leptinaria tamaulipensis Pilsbry, 1903
- Leptinaria sp. – endemic
- Opeas pumillum (Pfeiffer, 1840)
- Pseudopeas sp. – endemic
- Subulina octona (Bruguière, 1792)

Streptaxidae

- Huttonella bicolor (Hutton, 1834)

Spiraxidae

- Euglandina cumingii (Beck, 1837)
- Euglandina obtusa (Pfeiffer, 1844) – endemic
- Euglandina wani (Jaconson, 1968) – synonym: Streptostyla wani Jaconson, 1968 – endemic
- Pittieria underwoodi (Fulton, 1897)
- Salasiella guatemalensis Pilsbry, 1919
- Salasiella hinkleyi Pilsbry, 1919
- Salasiella perpusilla (Pfeiffer, 1880)
- Spiraxis sp. – endemic
- Streptostyla turgidula Pfeiffer, 1856

Agriolimacidae

- Deroceras laeve (Müller, 1774)

Euconulidae

- Euconulus pittieri (Martens, 1892)
- Guppya gundlachi (Pfeiffer, 1880)
- Habroconus championi (Martens, 1892)
- Habroconus selenkai (Pfeiffer, 1866)
- Habroconus trochulinus (Morelet, 1851)

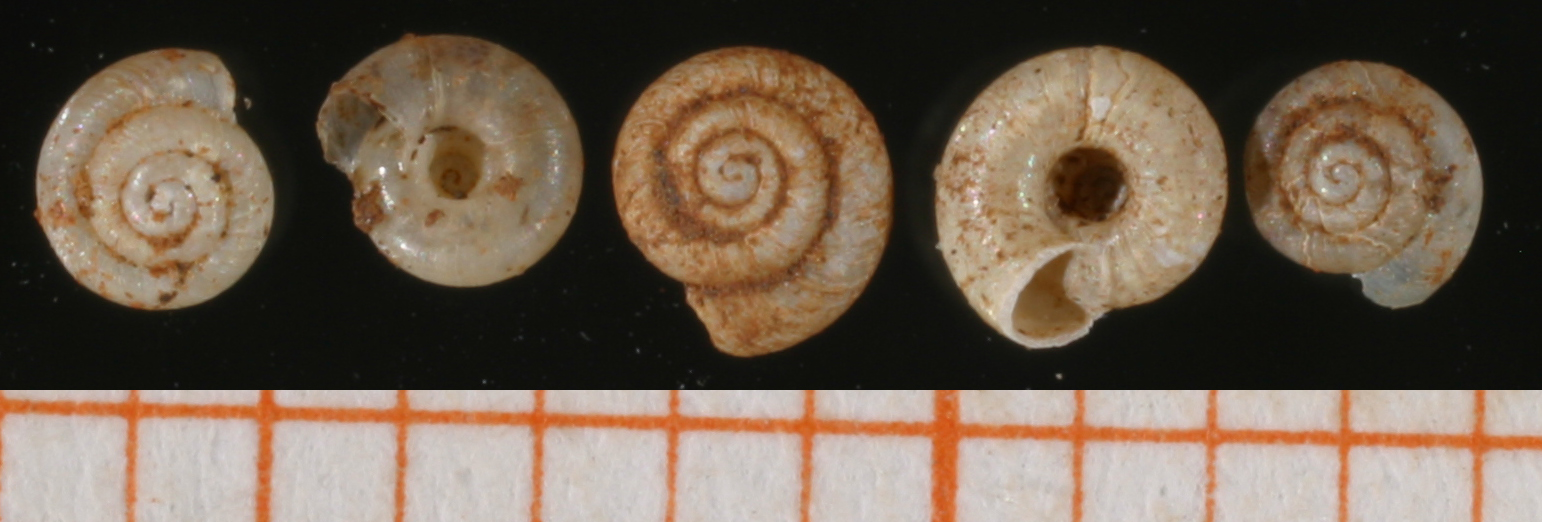
Five shells of Hawaiia minuscula

Pristilomatidae

- Hawaiia minuscula (Binney, 1840)

Zonitidae

- Glyphyalinia indentata (Say, 1822)
- Glyphyalinia sp. – endemic
- Striatura meridionalis (Pilsbry & Ferriss, 1906)

Helminthoglyptidae

- Trichodiscina coactiliata (Deshayes, 1838)

Polygyridae

- Praticollela griseola (Pfeiffer, 1841)

Thysanophoridae

- Thysanophora caecoides (Tate, 1870)
- Thysanophora costaricensis Rehder, 1942
- Thysanophora crinita (Fulton, 1917)
- Thysanophora hornii (Gabb, 1866)
- Thysanophora plagioptycha (Shuttleworth, 1854)

Sagdidae

- Xenodiscula taintori (Goodrich & Schalie, 1937)

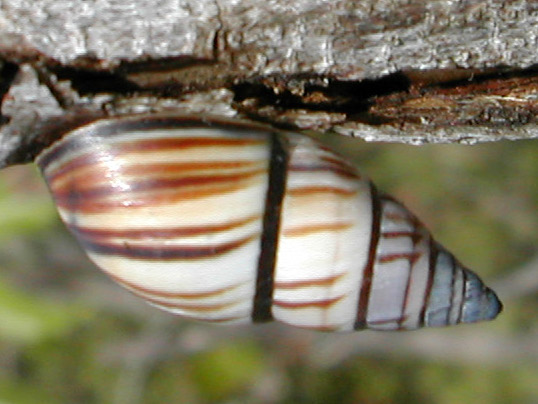
Drymaeus multilineatus

Orthalicidae

- Orthalicus ferussaci Martens, 1863
- Orthalicus princeps (Broderip, 1833)
- Bulimulus corneus (Sowerby, 1833)
- Drymaeus alternans (Beck, 1837)
- Drymaeus attenuatus (Pfeiffer, 1851)
- Drymaeus discrepans (Sowerby, 1833)
- Drymaeus dominicus Reeve, 1850
- Drymaeus multilineatus (Say, 1825)
- Drymaeus translucens (Broderip, 1832)

Systrophiidae

- Drepanostomella pinchoti Pilsbry, 1930
- Miradiscops opal (Pilsbry, 1916) – endemic
- Miradiscops panamensis Pilsbry, 1930

Punctidae

- Punctum burringtoni Pilsbry, 1930

Charopidae

- Chanomphalus pilsbryi (Baker, 1922)
- Radiodiscus millecostatus Pilsbry & Ferris, 1906
- Radiodiscus sp. – endemic

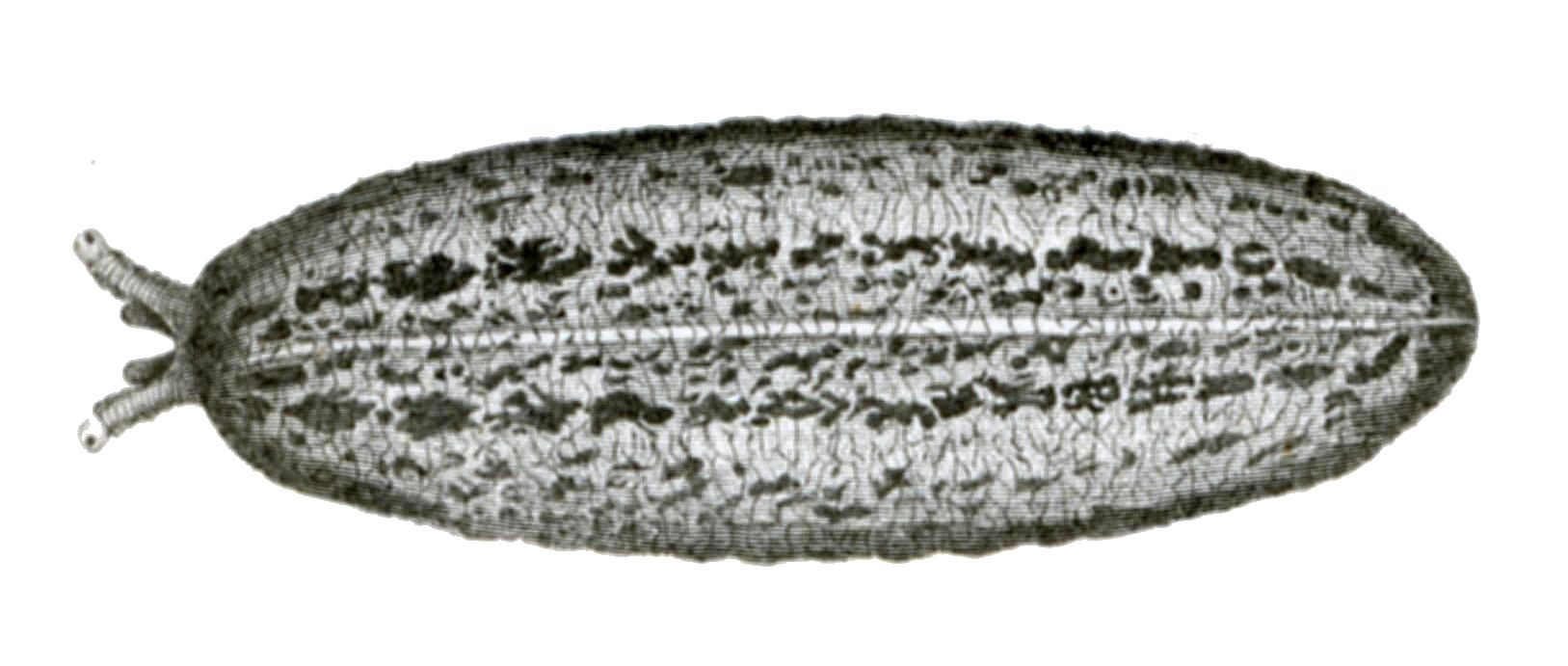
A drawing of Leidyula floridana

Veronicellidae

- Diplosolenodes occidentalis (Guilding, 1825)
- Leidyula floridana (Leidy & Binney, 1851)

== See also ==
Regional:

- List of non-marine molluscs of Honduras
- List of non-marine molluscs of Costa Rica

General:

- Fauna of Nicaragua
