= Streptostyla turgidula =

Conservation status
- Data Deficient (IUCN 2.3)

Scientific classification
- Kingdom: Animalia
- Phylum: Mollusca
- Class: Gastropoda
- Order: Stylommatophora
- Family: Spiraxidae
- Genus: Streptostyla
- Species: S. turgidula

Binomial name
- Streptostyla turgidula (Pfeiffer, 1856)

Synonyms
- Spiraxis turgidula Pfeiffer, 1856

Species of gastropod

Streptostyla turgidula is a species of predatory, air-breathing, land snail, a terrestrial pulmonate gastropod mollusc in the family Spiraxidae. This species is found in Costa Rica, Guatemala, and Nicaragua.
