= Euglandina wani =

Streptostyla wani

Conservation status
- Data Deficient (IUCN 2.3)

Scientific classification
- Kingdom: Animalia
- Phylum: Mollusca
- Class: Gastropoda
- Order: Stylommatophora
- Family: Spiraxidae
- Genus: Euglandina
- Species: E. wani

Binomial name
- Euglandina wani (Jacobson, 1968)

Synonyms
- Streptostyla (Chersomitra) wani Jacobson, 1968

Species of gastropod

Euglandina wani is a species of predatory, air-breathing, land snail, a terrestrial pulmonate gastropod mollusk in the family Spiraxidae. This species is endemic to Nicaragua.
