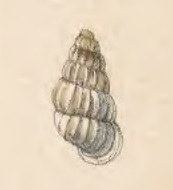

Conservation status
- Endangered (IUCN 2.3)

Scientific classification
- Kingdom: Animalia
- Phylum: Mollusca
- Class: Gastropoda
- Subclass: Caenogastropoda
- Order: Architaenioglossa
- Superfamily: Cyclophoroidea
- Family: Diplommatinidae
- Genus: Adelopoma
- Species: A. stolli

Binomial name
- Adelopoma stolli Martens, 1890

Synonyms
- Diplommatina stolli E. von Martens, 1890 (original combination)

= Adelopoma stolli =

Species of gastropod

Adelopoma stolli is a species of land snail with an operculum, a terrestrial gastropod mollusk in the family Diplommatinidae.

This species is found in Guatemala and Nicaragua.
