= Xenodiscula =

Scientific classification
- Domain: Eukaryota
- Kingdom: Animalia
- Phylum: Mollusca
- Class: Gastropoda
- Order: Stylommatophora
- Family: Sagdidae
- Subfamily: Sagdinae
- Genus: Xenodiscula

Genus of gastropods

Xenodiscula is a genus of air-breathing land snails, terrestrial pulmonate gastropod mollusks in the family Sagdidae.

== Species ==
There are currently two known species in the genus Xenodiscula:

- Xenodiscula taintori
- Xenodiscula venezuelensis
