= Xenodiscula taintori =

Conservation status
- Data Deficient (IUCN 2.3)

Scientific classification
- Kingdom: Animalia
- Phylum: Mollusca
- Class: Gastropoda
- Order: Stylommatophora
- Family: Sagdidae
- Genus: Xenodiscula
- Species: X. taintori

Binomial name
- Xenodiscula taintori Goodrich & Schalie, 1937

Species of gastropod

Xenodiscula taintori is a species of air-breathing land snail, a gastropod in the family Sagdidae. This species is found in Guatemala and Nicaragua.
