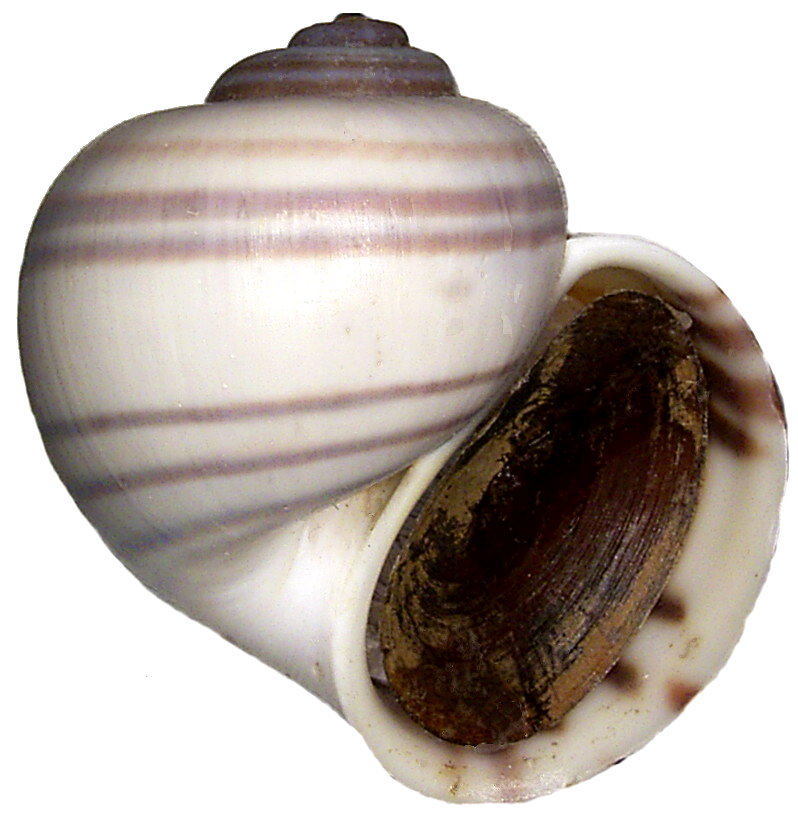
- Pomacea flagellata shell

Scientific classification
- Kingdom: Animalia
- Phylum: Mollusca
- Class: Gastropoda
- Subclass: Caenogastropoda
- Order: Architaenioglossa
- Family: Ampullariidae
- Genus: Pomacea
- Species: P. flagellata

Binomial name
- Pomacea flagellata (Say, 1827)

= Pomacea flagellata =

Species of gastropod

Pomacea flagellata is a species of freshwater snail with a gill and an operculum, an aquatic gastropod mollusk in the family Ampullariidae. In older literature this species was known as ghiesbrechti and today is still poorly understood.

The shell is nearly globular, often reaching almost 100 mm in height, but distinctly narrower with a large aperture. The shell surface often appears dimpled or hammered, and can range in color from olive-green to reddish-brown with colored bands.

== Distribution ==
Pomacea flagellata is found in Southern Mexico and northern Guatemala.
