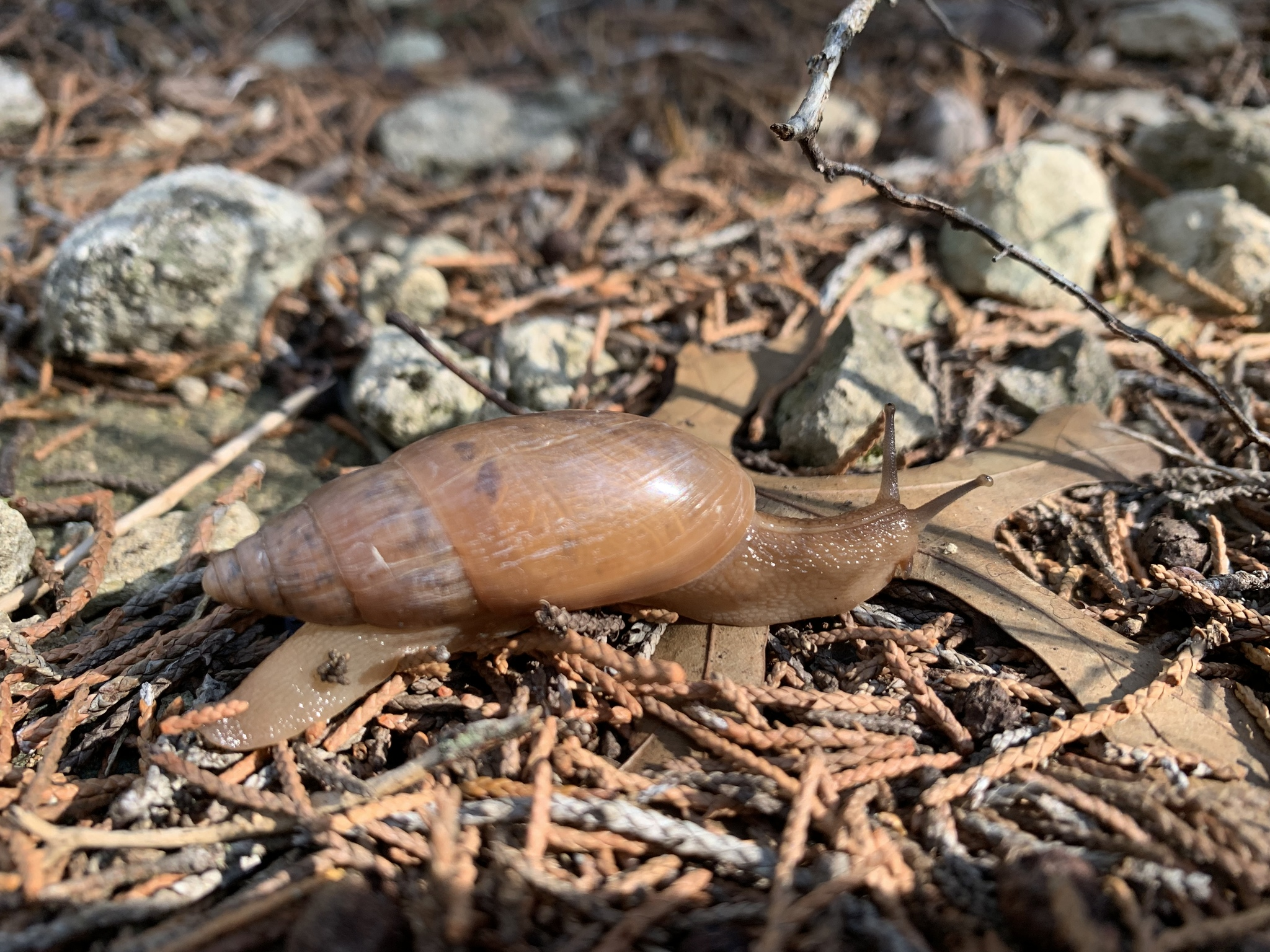

Conservation status
- Vulnerable (NatureServe)

Scientific classification
- Kingdom: Animalia
- Phylum: Mollusca
- Class: Gastropoda
- Order: Stylommatophora
- Family: Spiraxidae
- Genus: Euglandina
- Species: E. singleyana

Binomial name
- Euglandina singleyana (Binney, 1892)

= Euglandina singleyana =

Species of gastropod

Euglandina singleyana, the striate glandina or striate wolfsnail, is a species of predatory air-breathing land snail, a terrestrial pulmonate gastropod mollusk in the family Spiraxidae.

== Description ==
This snail has a golden-tan coloration, specially adapted mouthparts, and sensitive chemical receptors. It hunts and feeds in the same fashion as its larger congener, the rosy wolf snail, Euglandina rosea.

Euglandina singleyana is typically found in West Texas. It prefers areas of prairie and forest, under substrate of dead wood.
