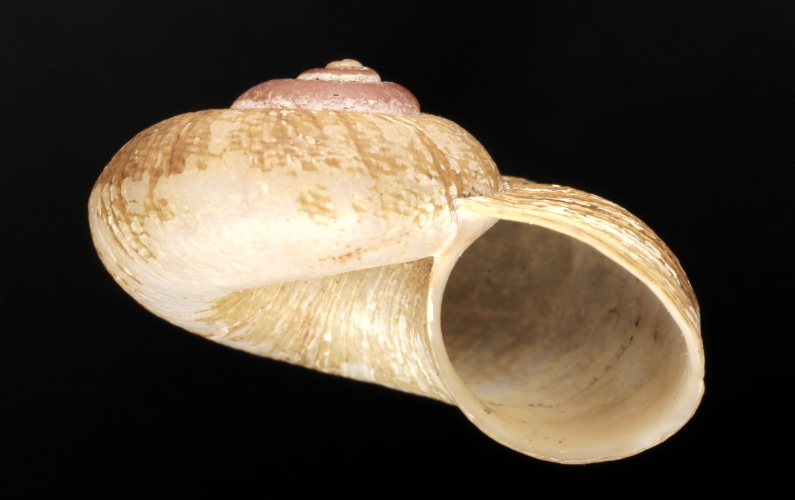
- Shell of Amphicyclotus maleri (specimen at MNHN, Paris)

Scientific classification
- Kingdom: Animalia
- Phylum: Mollusca
- Class: Gastropoda
- Subclass: Caenogastropoda
- Order: Architaenioglossa
- Family: Neocyclotidae
- Genus: Amphicyclotus
- Species: A. maleri

Binomial name
- Amphicyclotus maleri Crosse & P. Fischer, 1883

= Amphicyclotus maleri =

Species of gastropod

Amphicyclotus maleri is a species of tropical land snails with gills and an operculum, terrestrial gastropod mollusks in the family Neocyclotidae.

== Description ==
The height of the shell attains 13 mm, its diameter 26 mm.

The shell is broadly umbilicate, depressed-conical and displaying all whorls. It exhibits fine, obsolete malleations and a dirty white ground color beneath a thin, persistent, pellicle-like, olive-tawny periostracum. The spire is briefly conical, terminating in a somewhat obtuse apex. The suture is distinct. There are five weakly convex, rapidly expanding whorls. The first 2.5 whorls lack the periostracum, are nearly smooth, and display a rather intense purplish-pink hue. The body whorl is non-descending, wide, subdepressed, and bears an obsolete, barely visible peripheral angulation, slightly flattened basally. The aperture is oblique, subcircular, slightly angular superiorly, and livid white internally. The peristome is simple, subcontinuous, weakly thickened, and livid white, matching the aperture. The edges are joined by a thick callus deposit. The columellar edge is arched and subdilated, the basal edge is rounded, and the outer edge is attenuated, extending beyond the columellar edge at its insertion point, where it forms an angle.

The operculum is subcircular, thin and of membranous-corneous texture. The outer surface is polygyrate, concave, particularly centrally where it is tightly coiled and brownish-yellow. The inner surface is moderately convex, smooth, polished, corneous, and features a central obtuse, flattened mammilla. The nucleus is central.

== Distribution ==
This species was found in the state of Tabasco, Mexico and in Guatemala.
