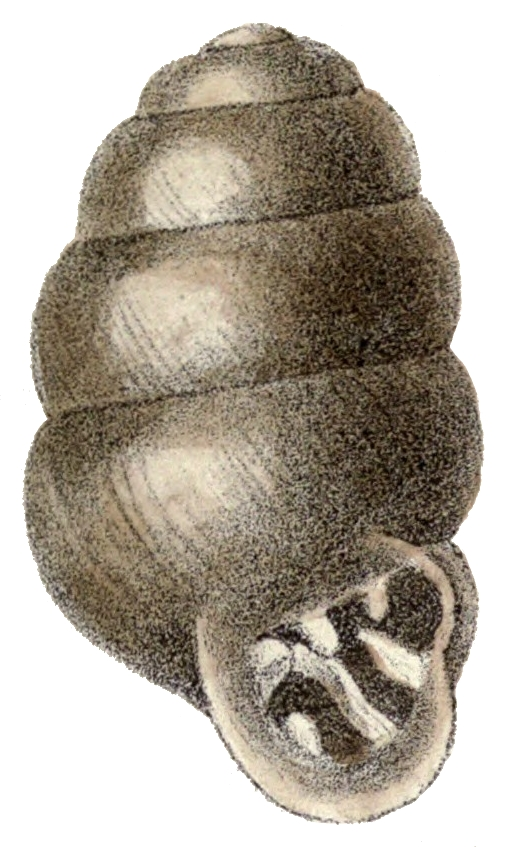
- Drawing of a shell of Vertigo milium

Scientific classification
- Domain: Eukaryota
- Kingdom: Animalia
- Phylum: Mollusca
- Class: Gastropoda
- Order: Stylommatophora
- Family: Vertiginidae
- Subfamily: Vertigininae
- Genus: Vertigo
- Species: V. milium

Binomial name
- Vertigo milium (Gould, 1840)

Synonyms
- Angustula milium (A.A. Gould, 1840); Pupa milium Gould, 1840; Vertigo (Alaea) milium (A. Gould, 1840) · alternate representation; Vertigo (Angustula) milium (A. Gould, 1840)

= Vertigo milium =

Species of gastropod

Vertigo milium, common name the blade vertigo, is a species of small air-breathing land snail, a terrestrial pulmonate gastropod mollusk in the family Vertiginidae, the whorl snails.

The variety Vertigo milium var. antillarum Pilsbry, 1934 is a taxon inquirendum.

== Shell description ==
The shell is small, subcylindrical, smooth shining. Growth lines are very fine, a little oblique. Apex is smooth. The color of the shell is dark chest-nut. The shell has 5 rounded whorls, that are somewhat regularly increasing and decreasing to a bluntly rounded apex. Sutures are impressed.

The aperture is obscurely semicircular, lateral and truncated above. The "circumference" of the aperture is "made up of two curves of different radius uniting in the peristome, where the junction causes an angle projecting inwards, the smaller curve comprising about one-fourth part and forming the superior portion of the peristome. The aperture has six teeth as follows: two sharp, projecting teeth of about equal size placed on the parietal wall and dividing that region into three nearly equal parts; one on the columella, large, massive, broad; a third placed on the outer lip above or at the junction of the two radii, long, curved, ridge-like, pointing directly between the two parietal teeth; a fourth on the base of the lip, small, conical, tubercular; and one large, entering, elevated, long lamina, which begins on the base of the lip and curves backward until it disappears behind the columella tooth (this is the "gular lamina" of Sterki). Peristome is white or brownish-white, reflected, the terminations separated, but joined by a prominent callus. The umbilicus is well marked, open, deep. Base of the shell is rounded.

The width of the shell is 0.80–0.90 mm. The height of the shell is 0.90–1.40 mm. The height of aperture is 0.25–0.30 mm.

== Anatomy ==
The animal is similar in form to the other species of Vertigo. The color is dirty white, darker on the upper surface. The foot is very broad, posterior of the center, from whence it tapers rapidly to a point. The foot is thick and fleshy and well able to support the light shell. Eye-peduncles are of medium length, somewhat enlarged at the tips, where the eyes are placed.

The jaw is very slightly arcuate, the ends a trifle rounded. Concave margin is notched and anterior surface lightly striated. The jaw is of equal width throughout its length.

The formula of the radula is like this: _{2} ^{7} _{7} + 4/2 + 1/3 + 4/2 + _{2} ^{7} _{7}

Teeth are as in the other members of the genus. There are four perfect lateral teeth and the first marginal tooth is similar but with a second outer cusp. From this point the marginals become wider, the inner cusp remains always the larger, and the outer cusp develops from five to seven small cusps or denticles.

== Distribution ==
Distribution of Vertigo milium include Illinois, Maine to Minnesota, Ontario and Quebec, Canada, to Florida and Texas, USA.

== Habitat ==
Baker (1902) described habitat like this: "Gregarious. Found plentifully under leaves, stones and sticks, in moist situations."
