= Xenodiscula venezuelensis =

Scientific classification
- Kingdom: Animalia
- Phylum: Mollusca
- Class: Gastropoda
- Order: Stylommatophora
- Family: Sagdidae
- Genus: Xenodiscula
- Species: X. venezuelensis

Binomial name
- Xenodiscula venezuelensis H.A. Pilsbry, 1919

Snail in the family Sagdidae

Xenodiscula venezuelensis is a species of air-breathing land snail, a gastropod in the family Sagdidae. This species is found in Venezuela.
