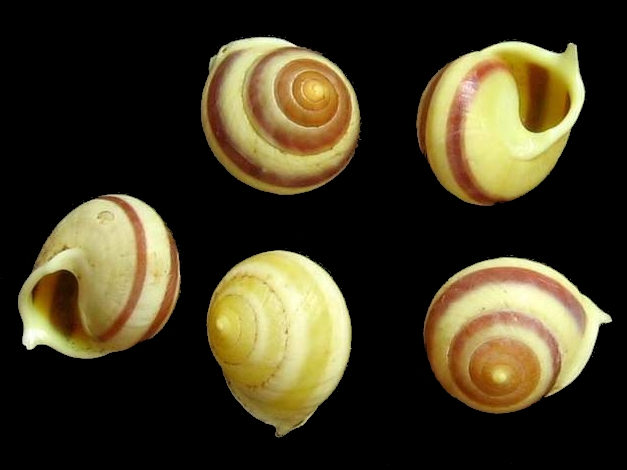
- Five shells of Helicina rostrata

Conservation status
- Endangered (IUCN 2.3)

Scientific classification
- Kingdom: Animalia
- Phylum: Mollusca
- Class: Gastropoda
- Order: Cycloneritida
- Family: Helicinidae
- Genus: Helicina
- Species: H. rostrata

Binomial name
- Helicina rostrata Morelet, 1851

= Helicina rostrata =

Species of mollusc

Helicina rostrata is a species of tropical land snail with an operculum, a terrestrial gastropod mollusc in the family Helicinidae.

This is an endangered species.

== Distribution ==
This land snail is found in Guatemala and Nicaragua.
