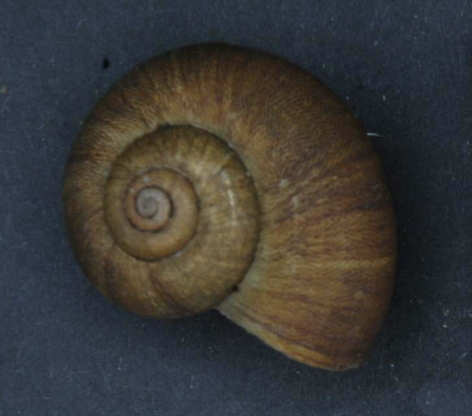
- Shell of Amphicyclotus texturatus (specimen at Naturalis Biodiversity Center)

Scientific classification
- Kingdom: Animalia
- Phylum: Mollusca
- Class: Gastropoda
- Subclass: Caenogastropoda
- Order: Architaenioglossa
- Family: Neocyclotidae
- Genus: Amphicyclotus
- Species: A. texturatus

Binomial name
- Amphicyclotus texturatus (G. B. Sowerby I, 1850)

Synonyms
- Cyclostoma texturatum G. B. Sowerby I, 1850 ·

= Amphicyclotus texturatus =

Species of gastropod

Amphicyclotus texturatus is a species of tropical land snails with gills and an operculum, terrestrial gastropod mollusks in the family Neocyclotidae.

Subspecies

- Amphicyclotus texturatus goldfussi (O. Boettger, 1892)
- Amphicyclotus texturatus spiralis F. G. Thompson, 1969
- Amphicyclotus texturatus texturatus (G. B. Sowerby I, 1850)

== Description ==
The height of the shell attains 18 mm, its diameter 41 mm.

(Original description in French) The shell is broadly umbilicate, depressed, and quite solid, despite being moderately thick. It is adorned with an elegant network of undulating, branching, and confluent longitudinal folds.

The shell's base color is whitish, beneath a thin, persistent, pellicle-like, olivaceous-tawny periostracum.

The spire is very briefly conical, terminating in an obtuse, purplish-pink apex. The suture is deeply impressed and slightly concave. There are five convex, rapidly expanding whorls, with the body whorl rounded. The aperture is nearly vertical, subcircular, and bluish-white internally. The peristome is simple, straight, of the same colour with the aperture, and barely subangular at the superior margin. The margins are joined by a thin, bluish-white callus deposit. The columellar margin is slightly thickened and arched, the basal margin is rounded, and the outer margin is thin and nearly sharp, with the upper margin almost horizontal.

The operculum is thin, somewhat flattened, and cartilaginous-corneous. The outer surface consists of numerous distinct whorls, the last of which terminates abruptly, tightly coiled towards the slightly concave central region, and is corneous in color.

The inner surface is glossy and corneous-tawny, convex centrally, featuring an obtuse, flattened mammilla. Distant, faint concentric striae are visible, blending, through transparency, with the outer spiral system.

== Distribution ==
This species was found in Guatemala and in the state Oaxaca, Mexico.
