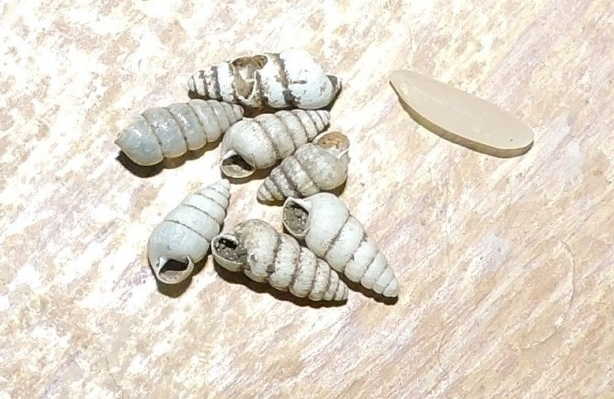

Conservation status
- Secure (NatureServe)

Scientific classification
- Kingdom: Animalia
- Phylum: Mollusca
- Class: Gastropoda
- Order: Stylommatophora
- Family: Achatinidae
- Genus: Beckianum
- Species: B. beckianum

Binomial name
- Beckianum beckianum (L. Pfeiffer, 1846)

Synonyms
- Synopeas beckianum (Pfeiffer)

= Beckianum beckianum =

Species of gastropod

Beckianum beckianum is a species of air-breathing land snail, a terrestrial pulmonate gastropod mollusc in the family Achatinidae.

== Subspecies ==
Subspecies of Beckianum beckianum include:

- Beckianum beckianum beckianum (L. Pfeiffer, 1846)
- Beckianum beckianum gabbianum (Angas, 1879)

== Description ==
Beckianum beckianum is a small snail.

== Distribution ==
Beckianum beckianum is believed to be native to the Caribbean Basin.

The distribution of Beckianum beckianum includes the Venezuela, West Indies, and Central America.

- Nicaragua
- Honduras
- Costa Rica
- USA - introduced:
  - Miami-Dade County, Florida – it has been reported since 2003
  - Broward County, Florida – it has been reported since 2003
- Cuba - probably introduced

Lesser Antilles

- Saint Martin – first reported in 2001
- Saint Barthélemy
- Saba – first collected in 1949
- Saint Kitts and Nevis – first collected in 1949
- Antigua – first collected in 1955
- Guadeloupe – possibly introduced. First reported in 1867
- Dominica – introduced. First reported in 2009
- Martinique – introduced. First reported in 1874
- Trinidad – first collected in 1948
- Margarita – first collected in 1936

This species was introduced with horticultural shipments to the Hawaiian Islands in the early 1900s.

This snail can occasionally be spread via trade of cut flowers and beans (Phaseolus sp.).

== Ecology ==
Beckianum beckianum is considered to be a detritivore (eats detritus) and/or phytophagous (eats plants).
