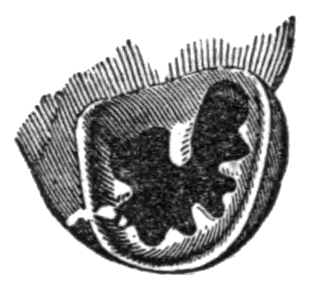
- View of the aperture of a shell of Gastrocopta pentodon

Conservation status
- Secure (NatureServe)

Scientific classification
- Kingdom: Animalia
- Phylum: Mollusca
- Class: Gastropoda
- Order: Stylommatophora
- Family: Gastrocoptidae
- Genus: Gastrocopta
- Species: G. pentodon

Binomial name
- Gastrocopta pentodon (Say, 1821)

Synonyms
- Bifidaria pentodon

= Gastrocopta pentodon =

Species of gastropod

Gastrocopta pentodon, the comb snaggletooth, is a species of small air-breathing land snail, a terrestrial pulmonate gastropod mollusc or micromollusc in the family Gastrocoptidae.
