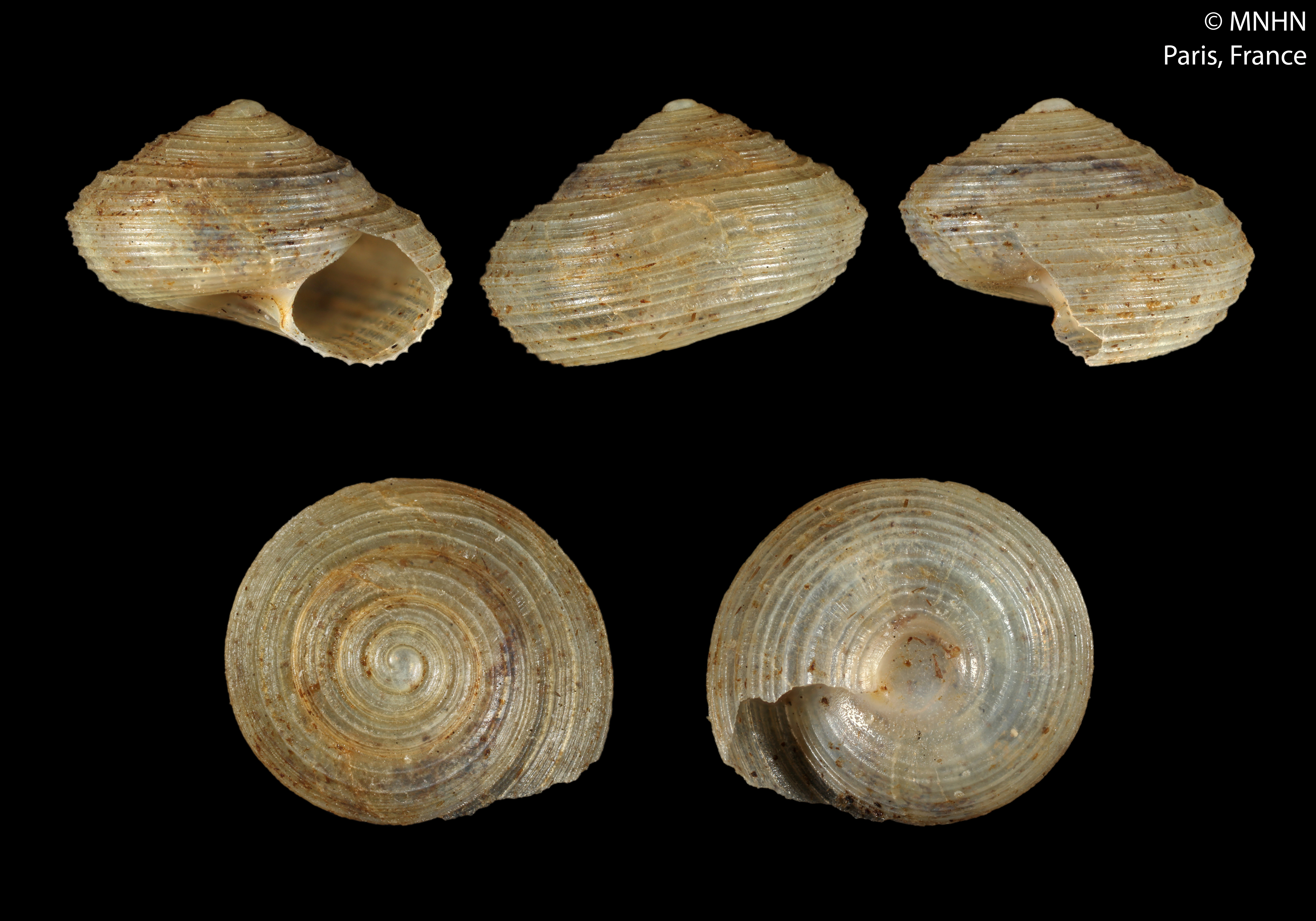

Scientific classification
- Kingdom: Animalia
- Phylum: Mollusca
- Class: Gastropoda
- Order: Cycloneritida
- Family: Helicinidae
- Genus: Lucidella
- Species: L. lirata

Binomial name
- Lucidella lirata (Pfeiffer, 1847)

= Lucidella lirata =

Species of gastropod

Lucidella lirata is a species of gastropods belonging to the family Helicinidae.

The species is found in America.
