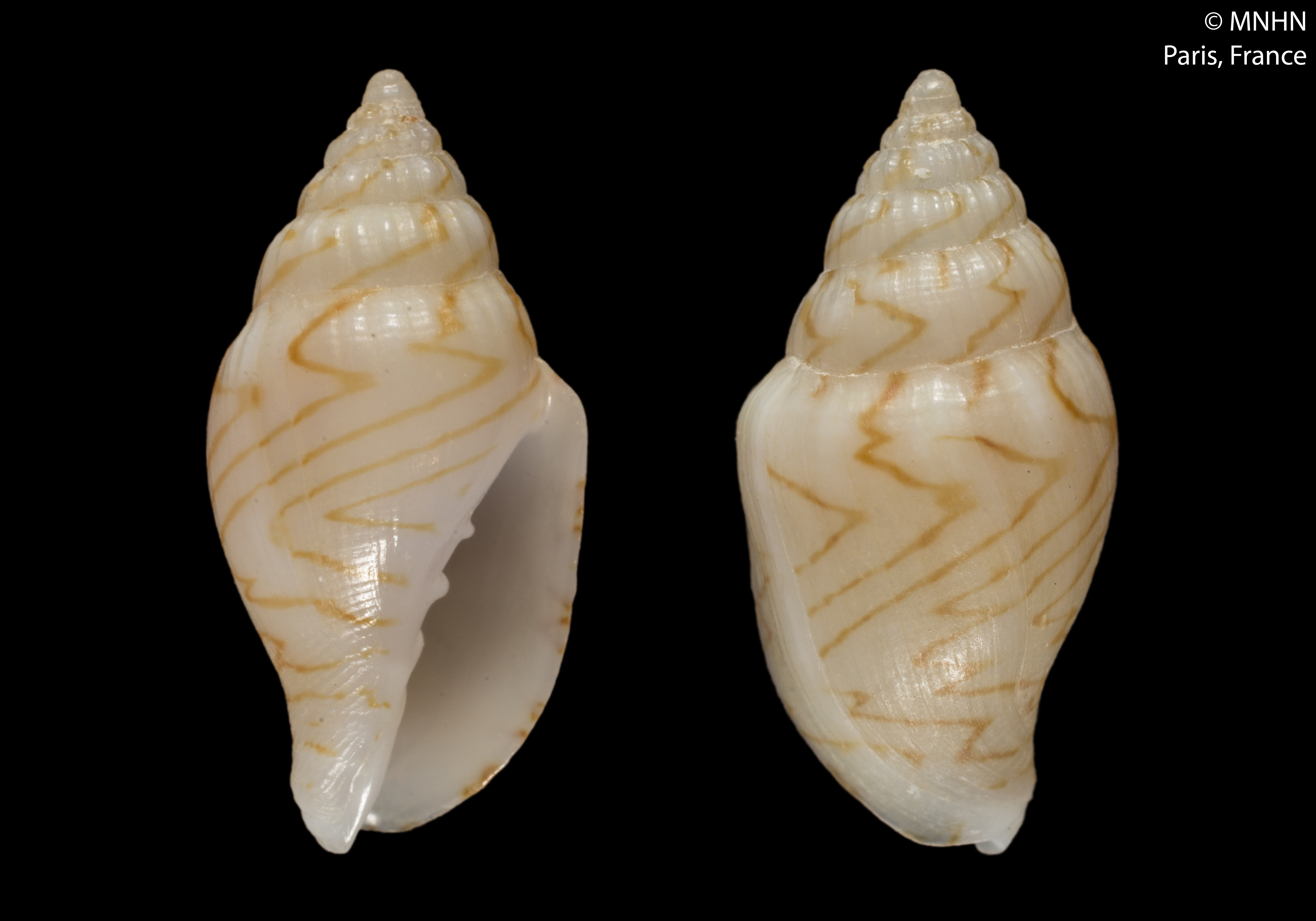
- Volutomitra ziczac

Scientific classification
- Kingdom: Animalia
- Phylum: Mollusca
- Class: Gastropoda
- Subclass: Caenogastropoda
- Order: Neogastropoda
- Superfamily: Turbinelloidea
- Family: Volutomitridae
- Genus: Volutomitra; H. Adams & A. Adams, 1853

Type species
- Volutomitra groenlandica groenlandica Beck, H.H. in Möller, H.P.C., 1842

Synonyms
- Compsomitra Marwick, 1942; Mitra (Volutomitra) H. Adams & A. Adams, 1853; Volutomitra (Waimatea) Finlay, 1926; Waimatea Finlay, 1873

= Volutomitra =

Volutomitra Temporal range: Upper Cretaceous to Recent

Genus of sea snails

Volutomitra is a genus of sea snails, marine gastropod molluscs in the family Volutomitridae, the mitres, with global distribution.

== Description ==
The smooth shell is ovate or fusiform, covered with an epidermis. The whorls are simple. The columella shows oblique plaits. The outer lip is thin, simple and arcuated.

== Species ==
Species in the genus Volutomitra include:

- † Volutomitra amplexa (Finlay, 1930) †
- Volutomitra andreiae R. Salisbury & Gori, 2019
- † Volutomitra antarctmella (Stilwell, Zinsmeister & Oleinik, 2004)
- Volutomitra bairdii (Dall, 1889)
- Volutomitra banksi (Dell, 1951)
- Volutomitra bayeri Okutani, 1982
- Volutomitra blanfordi (Melvill & Standen, 1901)
- Volutomitra carlosbranai R. Salisbury & Gori, 2019
- † Volutomitra cernohorskyi (Stilwell & Zinsmeister, 1992)
- † Volutomitra dennanti (Tate, 1889)
- Volutomitra erebus Bayer, 1971 - Erebus mitre-volute
- Volutomitra filippoi R. Salisbury & Gori, 2019
- Volutomitra francescae R. Salisbury & Gori, 2019
- Volutomitra geoffreyana (Melvill, 1910)
- Volutomitra glabella Bouchet & Kantor, 2000
- Volutomitra groenlandica (Moller, 1842) - false Greenland mitre
- Volutomitra hottentota Thiele, 1925
- † Volutomitra incisa (Marwick, 1942)
- † Volutomitra inconspicua (Hutton, 1885)
- † Volutomitra iredalei (Stilwell & Zinsmeister, 1992)
- † Volutomitra lornensis (Marwick, 1926)
- Volutomitra obscura (Hutton, 1873)
- † Volutomitra othone (Tenison Woods, 1879)
- † Volutomitra othoniana (Finlay, 1924)
- Volutomitra pailoloana (J. Cate, 1963)
- Volutomitra persephone Bayer, 1971
- Volutomitra rosadoi R. Salisbury & Gori, 2019
- † Volutomitra subcrenularis (Tate, 1889)
- Volutomitra tenella Golikov & Sirenko, 1998
- † Volutomitra transilis (Finlay, 1930)
- Volutomitra vaubani Cernohorsky, 1982
- † Volutomitra vitilevensis Ladd, 1982
- Volutomitra ziczac Bouchet & Kantor, 2004

Species brought into synonymy

- Volutomitra alaskana Dall, 1902 : synonym of Volutomitra groenlandica (Beck in Möller, 1842)
- Volutomitra cinnamomea A. Adams, 1855: synonym of Austromitra cinnamomea (A. Adams, 1855) (original combination)
- Volutomitra curta (Strebel, 1908): synonym of Paradmete curta (Strebel, 1908)
- Volutomitra digna A. Adams, 1855: synonym of Isara carbonaria (Swainson, 1822)
- Volutomitra fragillima R. B. Watson, 1882: synonym of Paradmete fragillima (R. B. Watson, 1882) (original combination)
- Volutomitra porcellana (Melvill & Standen, 1912): synonym of Volvarina porcellana (Melvill & Standen, 1912)
- Volutomitra vincta A. Adams, 1855: synonym of Austromitra analogica (Reeve, 1845)
- Volutomitra wandoensis Holmes, 1860: synonym of Vexillum wandoense (Holmes, 1860) (superseded combination)
