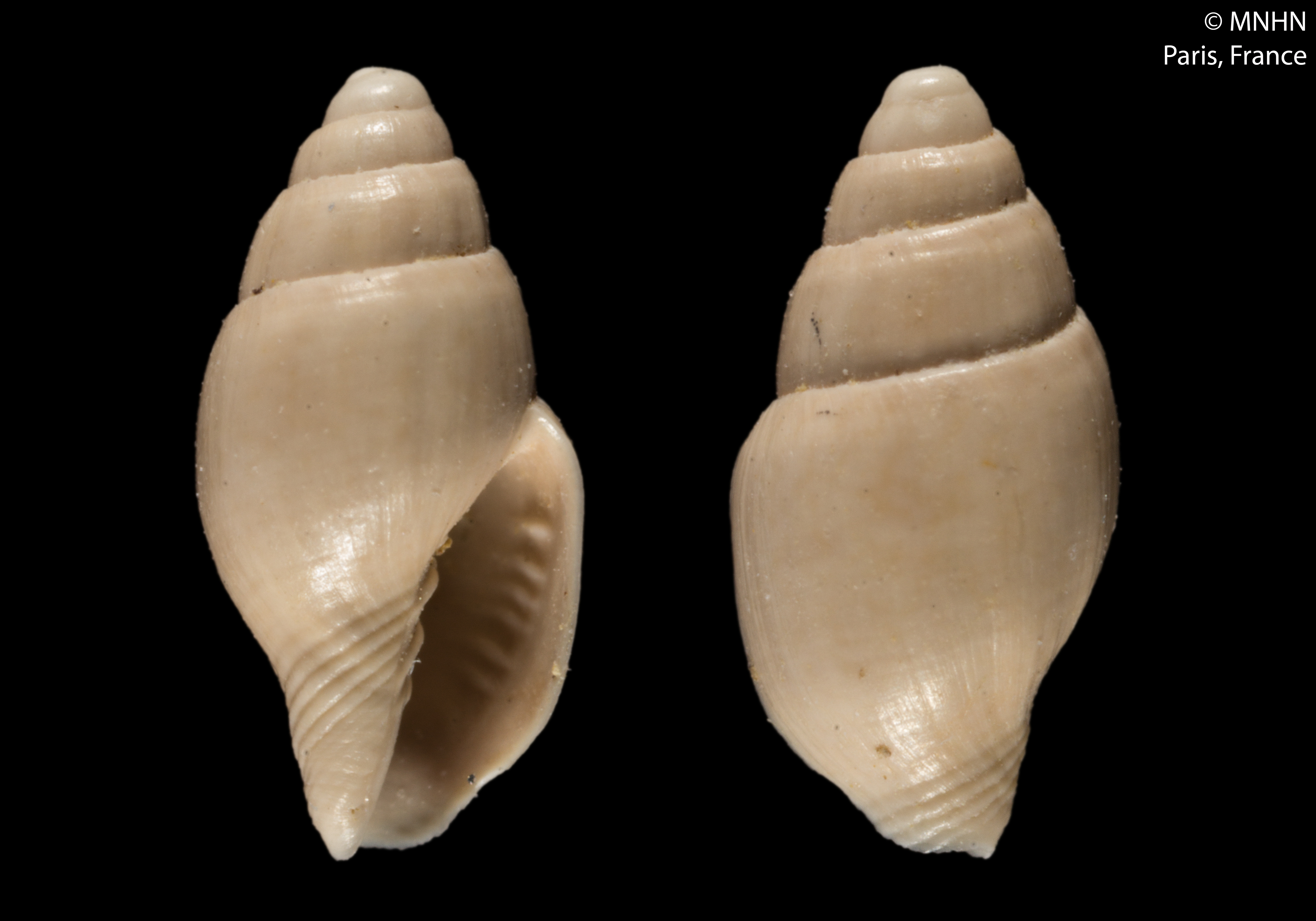
- Shell of † Conomitra praepinguis

Scientific classification
- Kingdom: Animalia
- Phylum: Mollusca
- Class: Gastropoda
- Subclass: Caenogastropoda
- Order: Neogastropoda
- Superfamily: Turbinelloidea
- Family: Volutomitridae
- Genus: Conomitra; Conrad, 1865

Type species
- † Mitra fusoides I. Lea, 1833

Synonyms
- Mitra (Conomitra) Conrad, 1865; Turricula (Conomitra) Conrad, 1865 superseded rank; Vexillum (Conomitra) Conrad, 1865 superseded rank

= Conomitra (gastropod) =

Genus of sea snails

Conomitra is a genus of sea snails, marine gastropod mollusks in the family Volutomitridae.

== Species ==
Species within the genus Conomitra include:

- † Conomitra alabaster (G. B. Sowerby III, 1900)
- † Conomitra anderidensis Périer, 1941
- † Conomitra angystoma (Deshayes, 1865)
- † Conomitra antarctolirata Stilwell & Zinsmeister, 1992
- † Conomitra antigua Doncieux, 1908
- † Conomitra apalachee J. A. Gardner, 1937
- † Conomitra artata Lozouet, 1999
- Conomitra biokoensis S.-I Huang & M.-H. Lin, 2023
- Conomitra boyeri R. Salisbury & Gori, 2019
- † Conomitra cancellina (Lamarck, 1803)
- † Conomitra capitolina Squires & Goedert, 1996
- Conomitra caribbeana Weinsbord, 1929
- † Conomitra eurycolpa Cossmann, 1907
- † Conomitra flexuosa Lozouet, 1999
- Conomitra floris S.-I Huang & M.-H. Lin, 2023
- † Conomitra fusellina (Lamarck, 1803)
- † Conomitra fusoides (I. Lea, 1833)
- † Conomitra godini (Cossmann, 1892)
- † Conomitra graniformis (Lamarck, 1803)
- † Conomitra hammakeri (G. D. Harris, 1894)
- † Conomitra hordeola (Deshayes, 1865)
- † Conomitra hortiensis Lozouet, 1999
- † Conomitra inaspecta (Deshayes, 1865)
- † Conomitra jacksonensis W. Cooke, 1926
- † Conomitra karamanensis Landau, Harzhauser, İslamoğlu & C. M. Silva, 2013
- † Conomitra lavelana F. Hodson, 1931 †
- † Conomitra lehneri Jung, 1971
- Conomitra leonardhilli Petuch, 1987
- Conomitra lindae Petuch, 1987
- † Conomitra marginata (Lamarck, 1803)
- † Conomitra mixta (Lamarck, 1803)
- † Conomitra nincki Cossmann, 1913
- † Conomitra peyreirensis Peyrot, 1928
- Conomitra picturata S.-I Huang & M.-H. Lin, 2023
- † Conomitra polita Vaughan, 1896
- † Conomitra praepinguis Lozouet, 1999
- † Conomitra primornata Lozouet, 1999
- † Conomitra prisca (Deshayes, 1865)
- † Conomitra ruellensis (Gougerot, 1968)
- † Conomitra sheldonae H. I. Tucker & D. Wilson, 1933
- Conomitra sibuyanensis (G. B. Sowerby III, 1914)
- † Conomitra strombodiformis Darragh, 2017
- † Conomitra subpontis (G. D. Harris, 1896)
- † Conomitra tetraptycta (Cossmann, 1885)
- † Conomitra texana (G. D. Harris, 1895)
- † Conomitra traceyi G. D. Harris, 1899
- † Conomitra vandervlerki K. Martin, 1931
- † Conomitra vernoniana Hickman, 1980
- † Conomitra vincentiana (Cossmann, 1881)
- † Conomitra vouastensis Périer, 1941
- † Conomitra washingtoniana (Weaver, 1912)
- † Conomitra wateleti (Briart & Cornet, 1870)
- † Conomitra weeksi F. Hodson, 1931

Species brought into synonymy

- Conomitra blakeana Dall, 1889: synonym of Microvoluta blakeana (Dall, 1889)
- † Conomitra cernohorskyi Stilwell & Zinsmeister, 1992: synonym of † Volutomitra cernohorskyi (Stilwell & Zinsmeister, 1992)
- Conomitra intermedia Dall, 1890: synonym of Microvoluta intermedia (Dall, 1890)
- † Conomitra iredalei Stilwell & Zinsmeister, 1992: synonym of † Volutomitra iredalei (Stilwell & Zinsmeister, 1992)
- † Conomitra othoniana Finlay, 1924: synonym of † Volutomitra othoniana (Finlay, 1924)
