= V. glabella =

V. glabella may refer to:

- Viola glabella, the stream violet or pioneer violet, a plant species found in northeastern Asia and northwestern North America
- Volutomitra glabella, a sea snail species

== See also ==
- Glabella (disambiguation)
