= M. intermedia =

M. intermedia may refer to:

- Mico intermedia, the Hershkovitz's marmoset or Aripuanã marmoset, a monkey species endemic to Brazil
- Microvoluta intermedia, a sea snail species
- Mitra intermedia, a sea snail species
- Mycalesis intermedia, a butterfly species found in Asia
- Myristica intermedia, a tree species in genus Myristica

== See also ==
- Intermedia (disambiguation)
