= Microvoluta hondana =

Scientific classification
- Kingdom: Animalia
- Phylum: Mollusca
- Class: Gastropoda
- Subclass: Caenogastropoda
- Order: Neogastropoda
- Family: Volutomitridae
- Genus: Microvoluta
- Species: M. hondana

Binomial name
- Microvoluta hondana (Yokoyama, 1922)

Synonyms
- Mitra hondana Yokoyama, 1922; Mitra pirula Yokoyama, 1922

Species of gastropod

Microvoluta hondana is a species of sea snail, a marine gastropod mollusk in the family Volutomitridae.
