= Microvoluta stadialis =

Scientific classification
- Kingdom: Animalia
- Phylum: Mollusca
- Class: Gastropoda
- Subclass: Caenogastropoda
- Order: Neogastropoda
- Family: Volutomitridae
- Genus: Microvoluta
- Species: M. stadialis

Binomial name
- Microvoluta stadialis (Hedley, 1911)

Synonyms
- Mitra stadialis Hedley, 1911

Species of gastropod

Microvoluta stadialis is a species of small sea snail, a marine gastropod mollusk in the family Volutomitridae.
