= Daffymitra lindae =

Scientific classification
- Kingdom: Animalia
- Phylum: Mollusca
- Class: Gastropoda
- Subclass: Caenogastropoda
- Order: Neogastropoda
- Family: Volutomitridae
- Genus: Daffymitra
- Species: D. lindae

Binomial name
- Daffymitra lindae Harasewych & Kantor, 2005

Species of gastropod

Daffymitra lindae is a species of sea snail, a marine gastropod mollusk in the family Volutomitridae.
