= Microvoluta teretiuscula =

Scientific classification
- Kingdom: Animalia
- Phylum: Mollusca
- Class: Gastropoda
- Subclass: Caenogastropoda
- Order: Neogastropoda
- Family: Volutomitridae
- Genus: Microvoluta
- Species: M. teretiuscula

Binomial name
- Microvoluta teretiuscula (Thiele, 1925)

Synonyms
- Mitra teretiuscula Thiele, 1925

Species of gastropod

Microvoluta teretiuscula is a species of sea snail, a marine gastropod mollusk in the family Volutomitridae.
