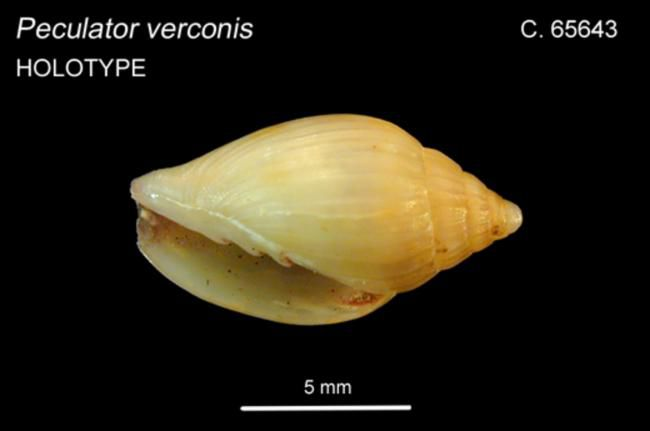

Scientific classification
- Kingdom: Animalia
- Phylum: Mollusca
- Class: Gastropoda
- Subclass: Caenogastropoda
- Order: Neogastropoda
- Family: Volutomitridae
- Genus: Peculator
- Species: P. verconis

Binomial name
- Peculator verconis Iredale, 1924

= Peculator verconis =

Species of gastropod

Peculator verconis is a species of sea snail in the family Volutomitridae.

== Description ==
The size of the shell attains 12 mm. The shell is very broad with an aperture measuring three-quarters of the total shell length. The whorls in the spire are rounded.

== Distribution ==
This marine species is endemic to Australia and occurs off New South Wales and Victoria. It is a rare species found at depths of 18–176 m (59–577 ft).
