= Volutomitra bayeri =

Scientific classification
- Kingdom: Animalia
- Phylum: Mollusca
- Class: Gastropoda
- Subclass: Caenogastropoda
- Order: Neogastropoda
- Superfamily: Turbinelloidea
- Family: Volutomitridae
- Genus: Volutomitra
- Species: V. bayeri

Binomial name
- Volutomitra bayeri Okutani, 1982

Species of gastropod

Volutomitra bayeri is a species of sea snail, a marine gastropod mollusk in the family Volutomitridae.

== Description ==
The length of the shell attains 28 mm.

== Distribution ==
This marine species occurs off Suriname.
