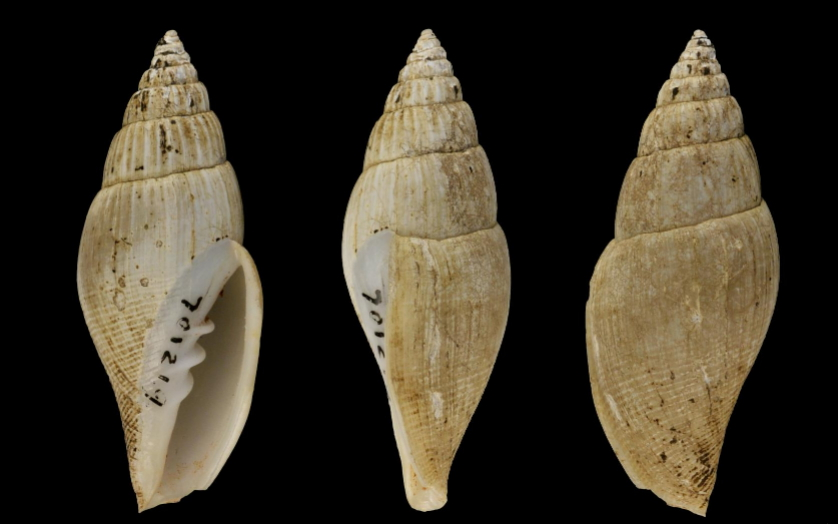
- Shell of Volutomitra erebus (holotype at the Smithsonian Institution)

Scientific classification
- Kingdom: Animalia
- Phylum: Mollusca
- Class: Gastropoda
- Subclass: Caenogastropoda
- Order: Neogastropoda
- Superfamily: Turbinelloidea
- Family: Volutomitridae
- Genus: Volutomitra
- Species: V. erebus

Binomial name
- Volutomitra erebus Bayer, 1971

= Volutomitra erebus =

Species of gastropod

Volutomitra erebus, common name the Erebus mitre volute, is a species of sea snail, a marine gastropod mollusk in the family Volutomitridae.

== Description ==
The length of the shell varies between 30 mm and 50 mm.

== Distribution ==
This marine species occurs off Colombia and in the Caribbean Sea off Trinidad and Tobago, and the Grenadines.
