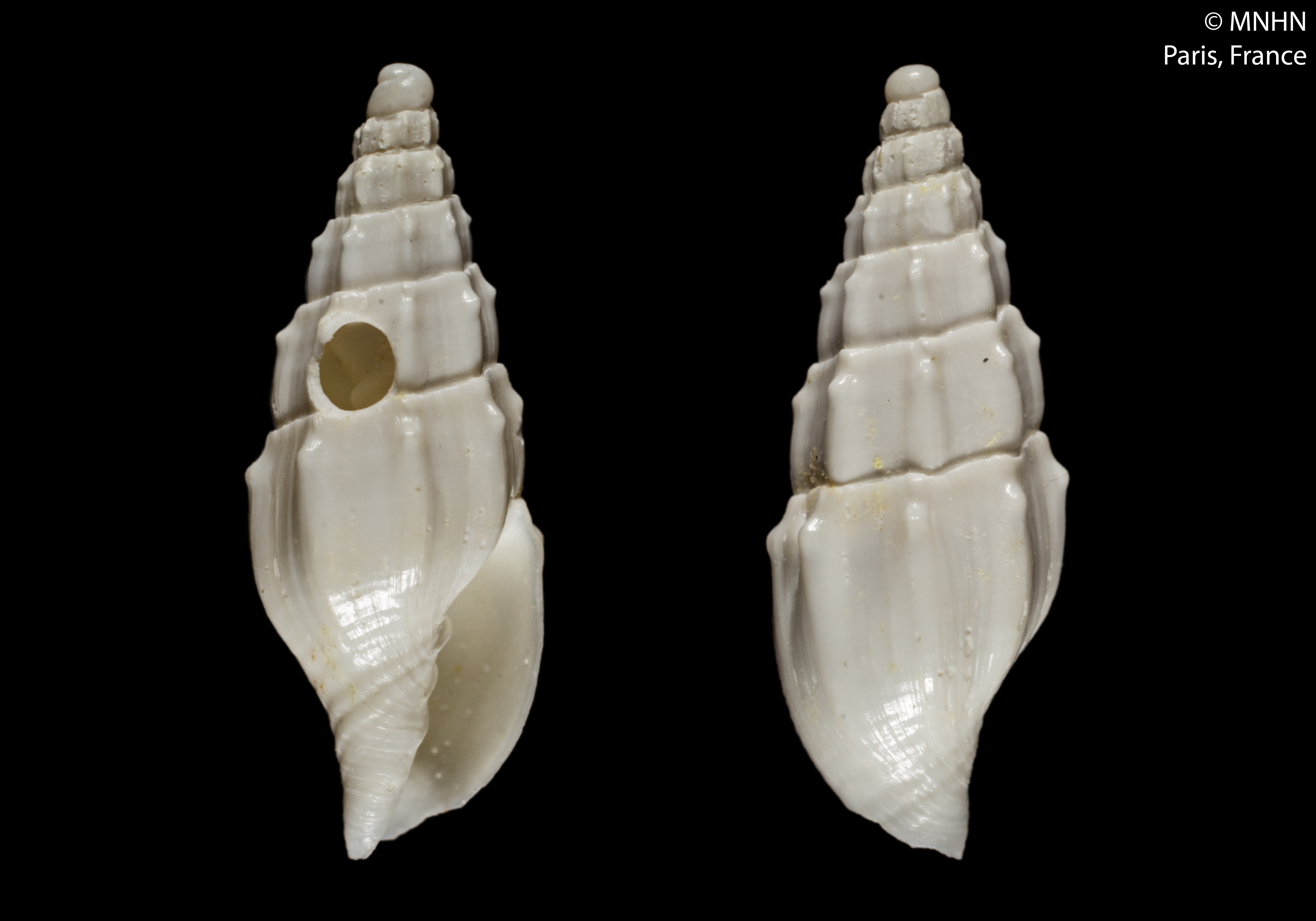
- Shell of Microvoluta cryptomitra (holotype at MNHN, Paris)

Scientific classification
- Kingdom: Animalia
- Phylum: Mollusca
- Class: Gastropoda
- Subclass: Caenogastropoda
- Order: Neogastropoda
- Family: Volutomitridae
- Genus: Microvoluta
- Species: M. cryptomitra

Binomial name
- Microvoluta cryptomitra Bouchet & Kantor, 2004

= Microvoluta cryptomitra =

Species of gastropod

Microvoluta cryptomitra is a species of sea snail, a marine gastropod mollusk in the family Volutomitridae.

== Description ==
The length of the shell attains 9.4 mm. It is a non broadcast spawner without a trocophere stage.

== Distribution ==
This marine species occurs in the Coral Sea, New Caledonia and Loyalty Islands found at a depth of 825-975 m.
