= Magdalemitra gilesorum =

Scientific classification
- Kingdom: Animalia
- Phylum: Mollusca
- Class: Gastropoda
- Subclass: Caenogastropoda
- Order: Neogastropoda
- Family: Volutomitridae
- Genus: Magdalemitra
- Species: M. gilesorum

Binomial name
- Magdalemitra gilesorum Kilburn, 1974

Species of gastropod

Magdalemitra gilesorum is a species of sea snail, a marine gastropod mollusk in the family Volutomitridae.
