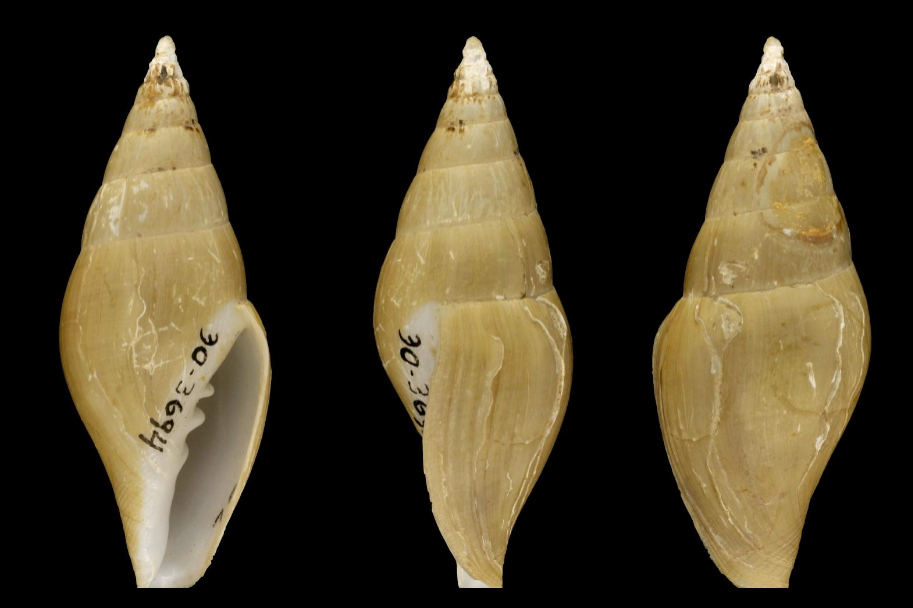
- Shell of Volutomitra persephone (holotype at the Smithsonian Institution)

Scientific classification
- Kingdom: Animalia
- Phylum: Mollusca
- Class: Gastropoda
- Subclass: Caenogastropoda
- Order: Neogastropoda
- Superfamily: Turbinelloidea
- Family: Volutomitridae
- Genus: Volutomitra
- Species: V. persephone

Binomial name
- Volutomitra persephone Bayer, 1971

= Volutomitra persephone =

Species of gastropod

Volutomitra persephone is a species of sea snail, a marine gastropod mollusk in the family Volutomitridae.

== Description ==
The length of the shell of the holotype is 40.7 mm; its diameter 16.1 mm.

== Distribution ==
This marine species occurs off Panama and Venezuela.
