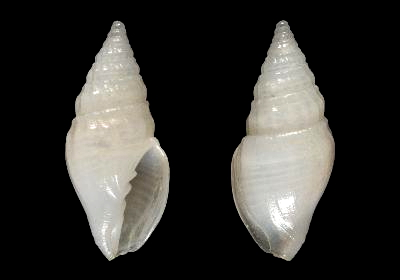
- Microvoluta cythara shell

Scientific classification
- Domain: Eukaryota
- Kingdom: Animalia
- Phylum: Mollusca
- Class: Gastropoda
- Subclass: Caenogastropoda
- Order: Neogastropoda
- Superfamily: Turbinelloidea
- Family: Volutomitridae
- Genus: Microvoluta; Angas, 1877

Type species
- Microvoluta australis Angas, 1877

Synonyms
- Vexillitra Marwick, 1931

= Microvoluta =

Microvoluta Temporal range: Lower Pliocene to Recent

Genus of sea snails

Microvoluta is a genus of very small sea snails, marine gastropod molluscs in the family Volutomitridae.

== Species ==
Species in the genus Microvoluta include:

- Microvoluta amphissa Bouchet & Kantor, 2004
- Microvoluta australis Angas, 1877
- † Microvoluta balteata (Marwick, 1931)
- Microvoluta blakeana (Dall, 1889)
- Microvoluta corona Simone & Cunha, 2012
- Microvoluta cryptomitra Bouchet & Kantor, 2004
- Microvoluta cythara Bouchet & Kantor, 2004
- Microvoluta dolichura Bouchet & Kantor, 2004
- Microvoluta echinata Bouchet & Kantor, 2004
- Microvoluta engonia Bouchet & Kantor, 2004
- † Microvoluta fracta (Marwick, 1926)
- Microvoluta garrardi Cernohorsky, 1975
- Microvoluta hondana (Yokoyama, 1922)
- Microvoluta intermedia (Dall, 1889)
- Microvoluta joloensis Cernohorsky, 1970
- Microvoluta marginata (Hutton, 1885)
- † Microvoluta marwicki (Vella, 1954)
- Microvoluta miranda (E. A. Smith, 1891)
- Microvoluta mitrella Bouchet & Kantor, 2004
- † Microvoluta nodulata P. A. Maxwell, 1988
- † Microvoluta pentaploca Finlay, 1927
- Microvoluta respergens Bouchet & Kantor, 2004
- Microvoluta royana Iredale, 1924
- Microvoluta stadialis (Hedley, 1911)
- Microvoluta superstes Bouchet & Warén, 1985
- Microvoluta teretiuscula (Thiele, 1925)
- Microvoluta veldhoveni deJong and Coomans, 1988
- † Microvoluta vetusta Laws, 1936
- † Microvoluta wainuioruensis (Vella, 1954)

Species brought into synonymy

- Microvoluta cuvierensis Finlay, 1930 synonym of Microvoluta marginata (Hutton, 1885)
- Microvoluta euzonata (G. B. Sowerby III, 1900): synonym of Austromitra euzonata (G. B. Sowerby III, 1900)
- Microvoluta obconica Powell, 1952 synonym of Peculator obconicus (Powell, 1952)
- Microvoluta ponderi Cernohorsky, 1975 synonym of Microvoluta miranda (E. A. Smith, 1891)
- Microvoluta purpureostoma Hedley & May, 1908 synonym of Microvoluta australis Angas, 1877
