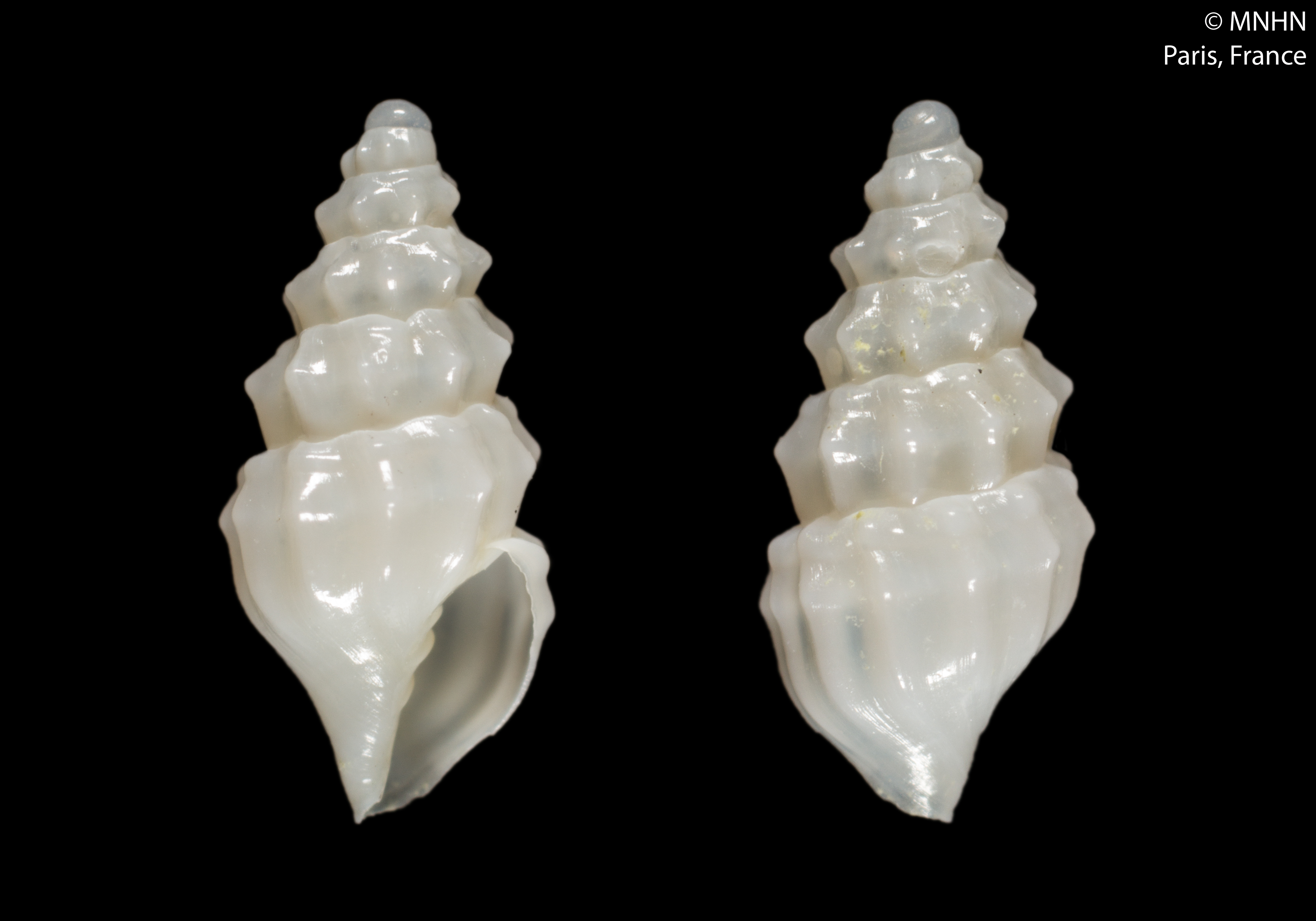
- Shell of Microvoluta echinata (holotype at MNHN, Paris)

Scientific classification
- Kingdom: Animalia
- Phylum: Mollusca
- Class: Gastropoda
- Subclass: Caenogastropoda
- Order: Neogastropoda
- Family: Volutomitridae
- Genus: Microvoluta
- Species: M. echinata

Binomial name
- Microvoluta echinata Bouchet & Kantor, 2004

= Microvoluta echinata =

Species of gastropod

Microvoluta echinata is a species of sea snail, a marine gastropod mollusk in the family Volutomitridae.

== Description ==
The length of the shell attains 5.7 mm.

== Distribution ==
This marine species occurs off New Caledonia.
