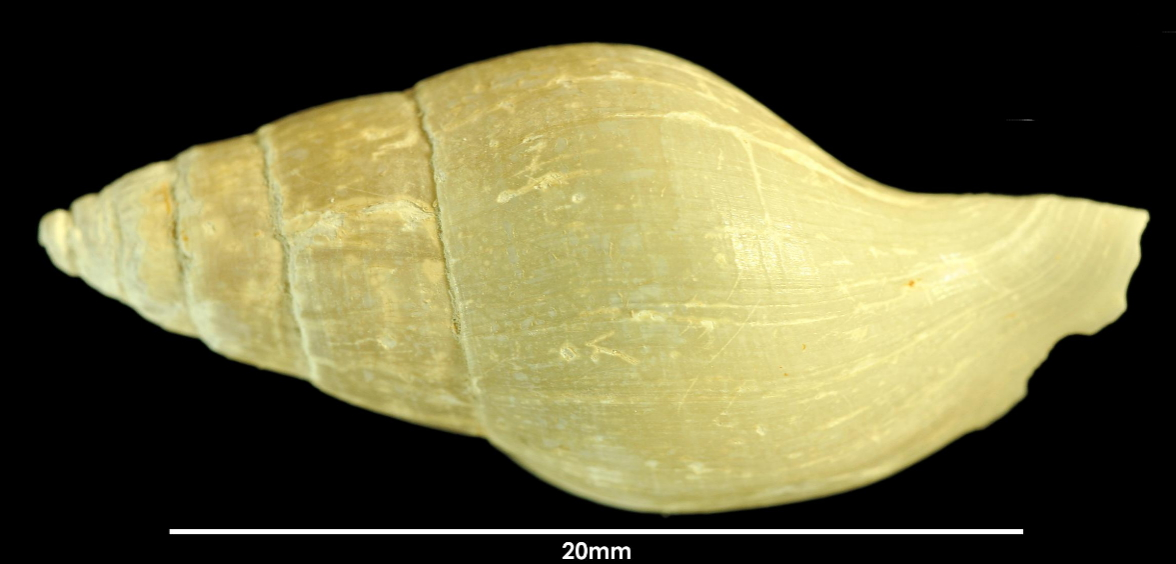
- Shell of Volutomitra banksi (specimen at the Smithsonian Institution)

Scientific classification
- Kingdom: Animalia
- Phylum: Mollusca
- Class: Gastropoda
- Subclass: Caenogastropoda
- Order: Neogastropoda
- Superfamily: Turbinelloidea
- Family: Volutomitridae
- Genus: Volutomitra
- Species: V. banksi

Binomial name
- Volutomitra banksi (Dell, 1951)

Synonyms
- Proximitra banksi Dell, 1951

= Volutomitra banksi =

Species of gastropod

Volutomitra banksi is a species of sea snail, a marine gastropod mollusc in the family Volutomitridae, the mitres.

== Description ==
The length of the shell attains 35 mm.

== Distribution ==
This marine species is endemic to New Zealand and found at the Cook Strait.
