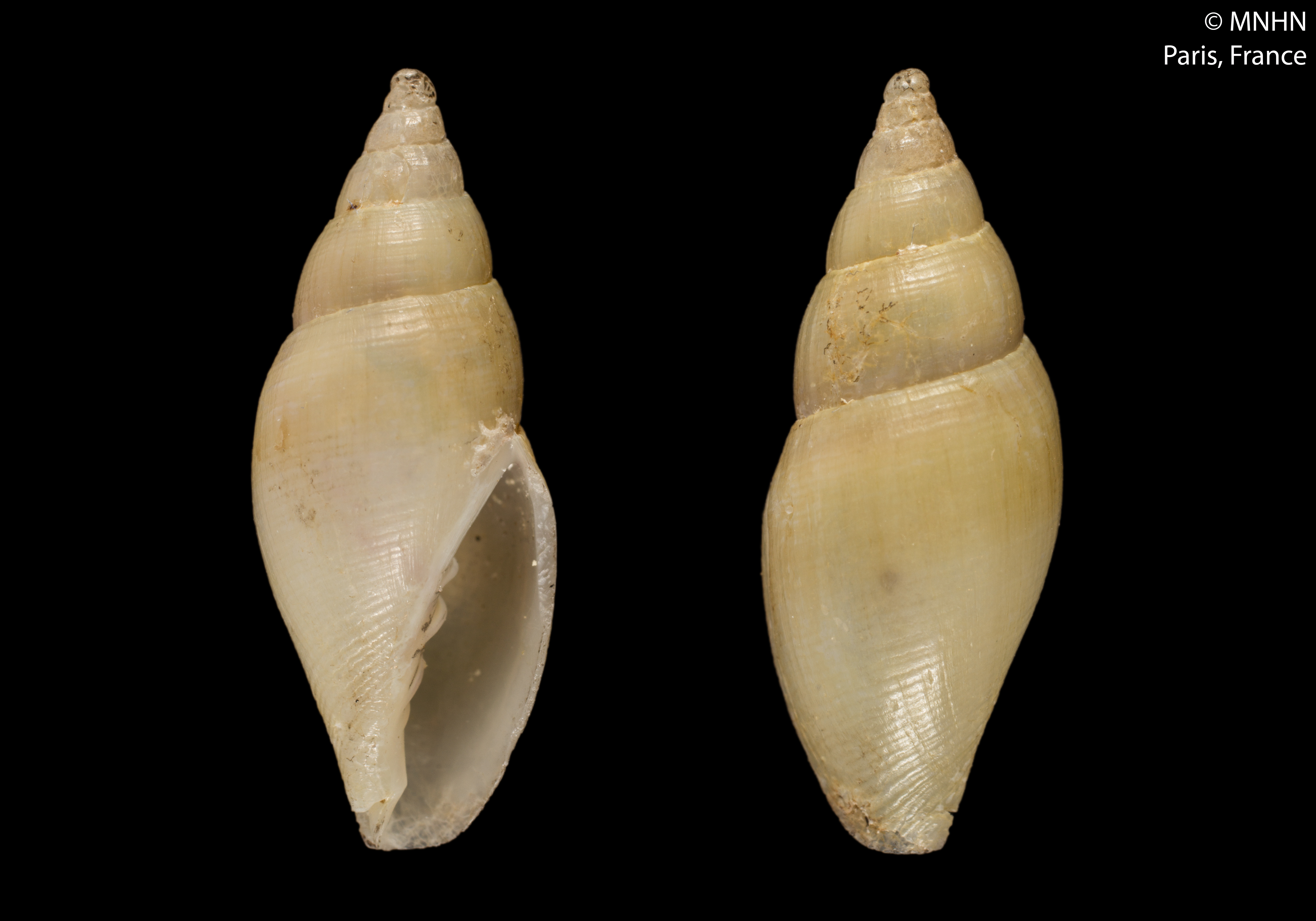
- Shell of Paradmete crymochara (syntype at MNHN, Paris)

Scientific classification
- Kingdom: Animalia
- Phylum: Mollusca
- Class: Gastropoda
- Subclass: Caenogastropoda
- Order: Neogastropoda
- Family: Volutomitridae
- Genus: Paradmete
- Species: P. cryptomara

Binomial name
- Paradmete cryptomara (Rochebrune & Mabille, 1885)

Synonyms
- Mitra cryptomara Rochebrune & Mabille, 1885

= Paradmete cryptomara =

Species of gastropod

Paradmete cryptomara is a species of sea snail, a marine gastropod mollusc in the family Volutomitridae.

== Description ==
The length of the shell attains 16.3 mm.

== Distribution ==
This marine species is found off Cape Horn.
