= Peculator porphyria =

Scientific classification
- Kingdom: Animalia
- Phylum: Mollusca
- Class: Gastropoda
- Subclass: Caenogastropoda
- Order: Neogastropoda
- Family: Volutomitridae
- Genus: Peculator
- Species: P. porphyria

Binomial name
- Peculator porphyria (Verco, 1896)

Synonyms
- Imbricaria porphyria Verco, 1896; Marginella coma Odhner, 1924

Species of gastropod

Peculator porphyria is a species of sea snail in the family Volutomitridae, the mitres. It occurs off the coast of Southern Australia and New Zealand at depths down to 200 m (660 ft).
