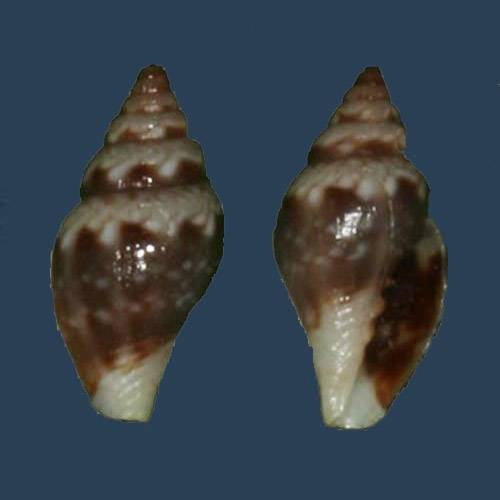
- Shell of Volutomitra obscura

Scientific classification
- Kingdom: Animalia
- Phylum: Mollusca
- Class: Gastropoda
- Subclass: Caenogastropoda
- Order: Neogastropoda
- Superfamily: Turbinelloidea
- Family: Volutomitridae
- Genus: Volutomitra
- Species: V. obscura

Binomial name
- Volutomitra obscura (Hutton, 1873)

Synonyms
- Mitra alboapicata E. A. Smith, 1898; Mitra mortenseni Odhner, 1924; Mitra obscura Hutton, 1873; Mitra pica Reeve, 1845; Waimatea obscura (Hutton, 1873)

= Volutomitra obscura =

Species of gastropod

Volutomitra obscura is a species of sea snail, a marine gastropod mollusk in the family Volutomitridae.

== Description ==
The length of the shell varies between 12 mm and 20 mm.

(Original description) The shell has an ovato-conical shape. The spire is acute. The whorls are subcarinate, those of the spire are transversely plicate. The body whorl is very finely longitudinally striated. The narrow aperture is spirally striated behind. The columella shows four plates, the anterior one small. The outer lip is angled and deeply notched in front. The shell is blackish brown, spotted with white, especially on the spire. The interior is purplish.

== Distribution ==
This marine species occurs off New Zealand and Australia (South Australia, Tasmania, Victoria).
