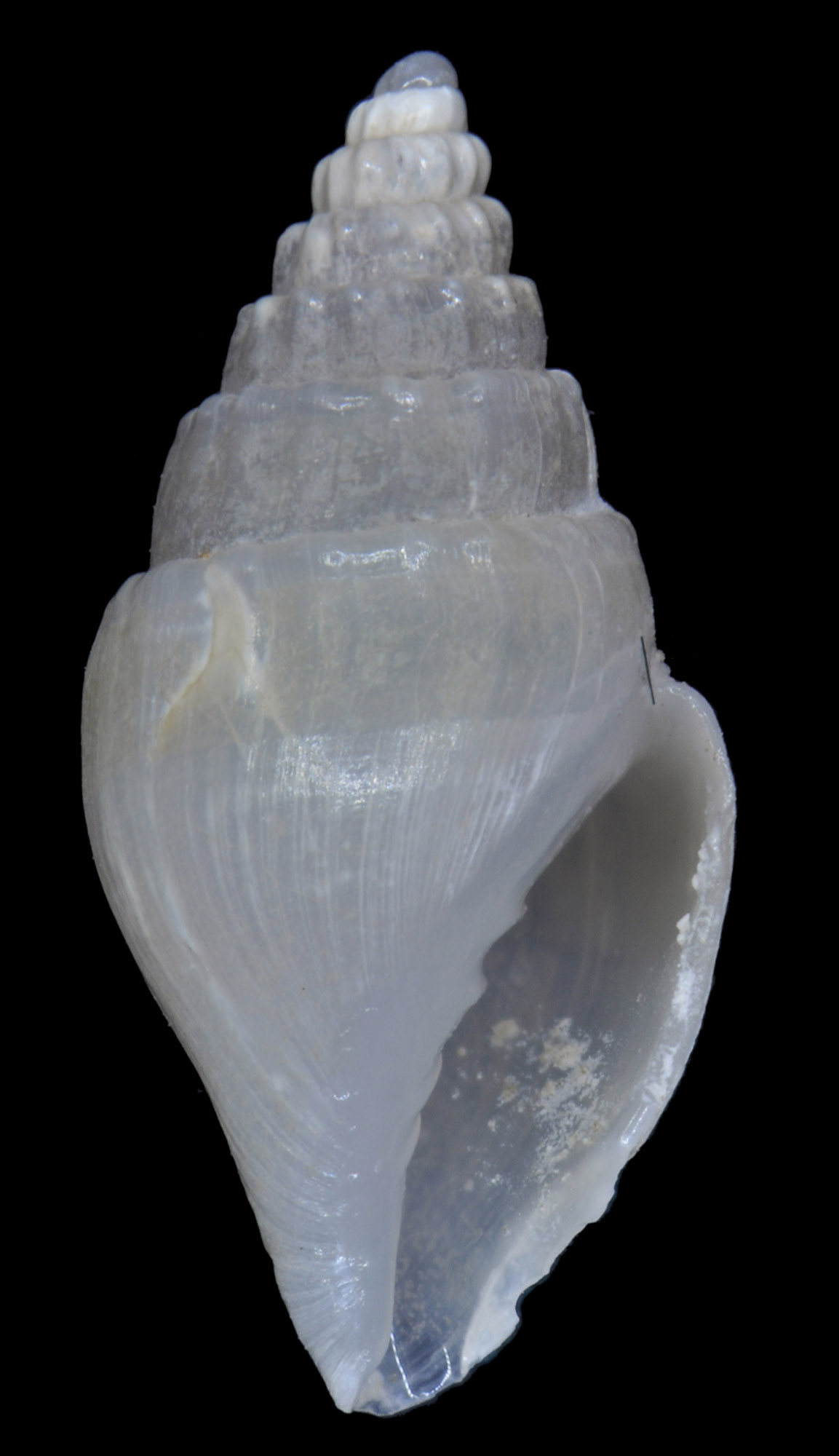
- Shell of Microvoluta joloensis (specimen at MNHN, Paris)

Scientific classification
- Kingdom: Animalia
- Phylum: Mollusca
- Class: Gastropoda
- Subclass: Caenogastropoda
- Order: Neogastropoda
- Family: Volutomitridae
- Genus: Microvoluta
- Species: M. joloensis

Binomial name
- Microvoluta joloensis Cernohorsky, 1970

= Microvoluta joloensis =

Species of gastropod

Microvoluta joloensis is a species of sea snail, a marine gastropod mollusk in the family Volutomitridae.

== Distribution ==
This marine species occurs off Papua New Guinea.
