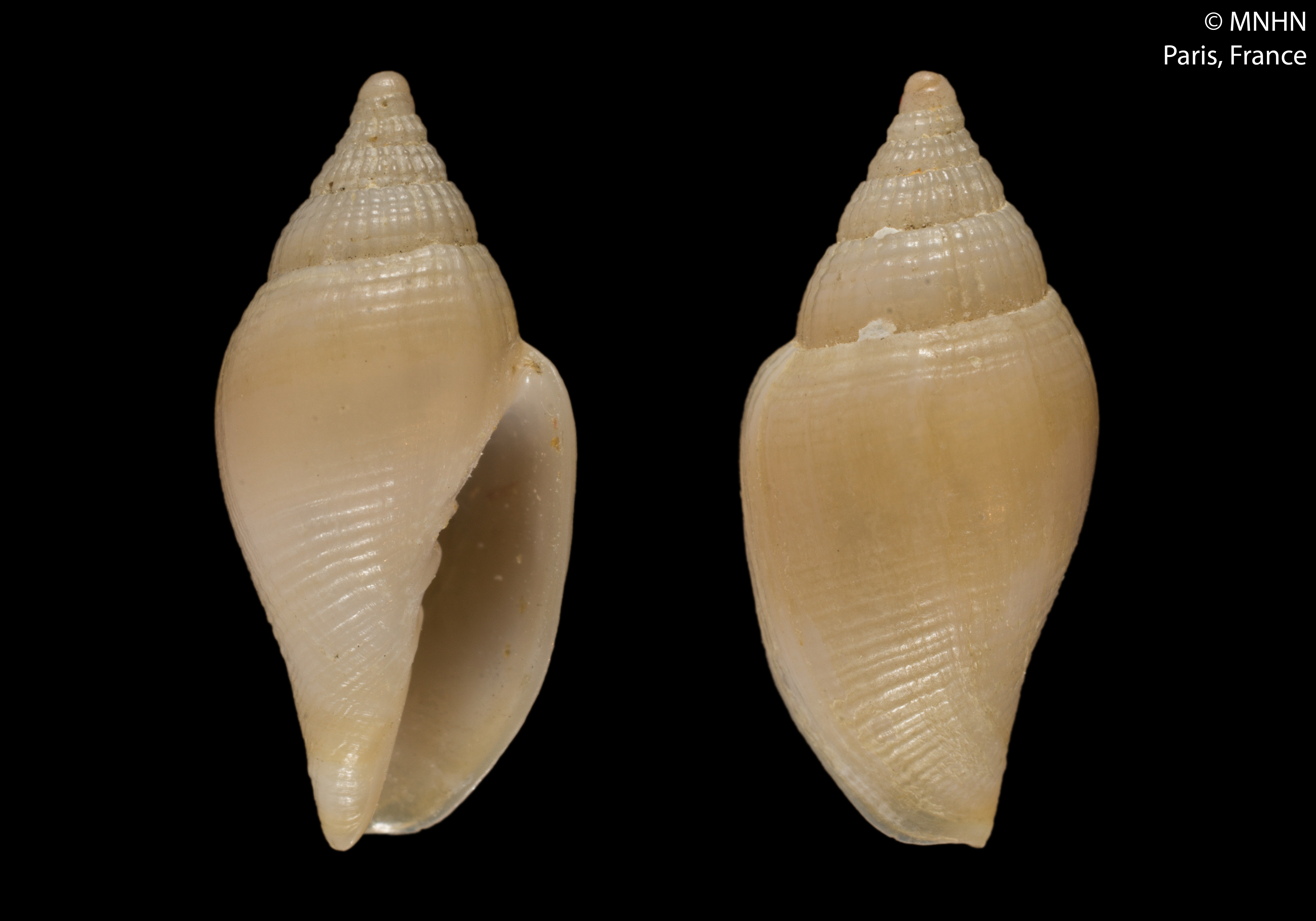
- Shell of Volutomitra vaubani (holotype at MNHN, Paris)

Scientific classification
- Kingdom: Animalia
- Phylum: Mollusca
- Class: Gastropoda
- Subclass: Caenogastropoda
- Order: Neogastropoda
- Superfamily: Turbinelloidea
- Family: Volutomitridae
- Genus: Volutomitra
- Species: V. vaubani

Binomial name
- Volutomitra vaubani Volutomitra vaubani (MNHN-IM-2000-30314).jpeg

Synonyms
- Volutomitra (Waimatea) vaubani Cernohorsky, 1982

= Volutomitra vaubani =

Species of gastropod

Volutomitra vaubani is a species of sea snail, a marine gastropod mollusk in the family Volutomitridae.

== Description ==
The length of the shell attains 13 mm.

== Distribution ==
This marine species occurs off New Caledonia.
