= Volutomitra tenella =

Scientific classification
- Kingdom: Animalia
- Phylum: Mollusca
- Class: Gastropoda
- Subclass: Caenogastropoda
- Order: Neogastropoda
- Superfamily: Turbinelloidea
- Family: Volutomitridae
- Genus: Volutomitra
- Species: V. tenella

Binomial name
- Volutomitra tenella Golikov & Sirenko, 1998

Species of gastropod

Volutomitra tenella is a species of sea snail, a marine gastropod mollusk in the family Volutomitridae.

== Distribution ==
This marine species occurs off the Kuril Archipelago.
