= Paradmete breidensis =

Scientific classification
- Kingdom: Animalia
- Phylum: Mollusca
- Class: Gastropoda
- Subclass: Caenogastropoda
- Order: Neogastropoda
- Family: Volutomitridae
- Genus: Paradmete
- Species: P. breidensis

Binomial name
- Paradmete breidensis Numanami, 1996

Species of gastropod

Paradmete breidensis is a species of sea snail, a marine gastropod mollusc in the family Volutomitridae.
