= Daffymitra =

Scientific classification
- Kingdom: Animalia
- Phylum: Mollusca
- Class: Gastropoda
- Subclass: Caenogastropoda
- Order: Neogastropoda
- Family: Volutomitridae
- Genus: Daffymitra; Harasewych & Kantor, 2005

Genus of gastropods

Daffymitra is a genus of sea snails, marine gastropod mollusks in the family Volutomitridae.

== Species ==
Species within the genus Daffymitra include:

- Daffymitra lindae Harasewych & Kantor, 2005
