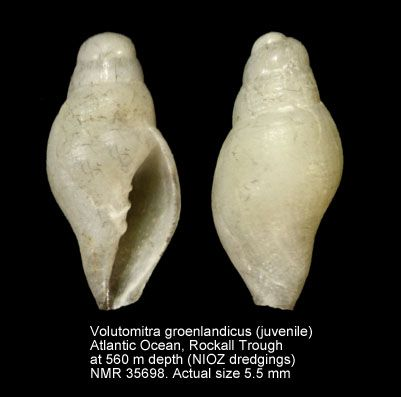
- Shell of Volutomitra groenlandica (speciem nat the Natural History Museum of Rotterdam)

Scientific classification
- Kingdom: Animalia
- Phylum: Mollusca
- Class: Gastropoda
- Subclass: Caenogastropoda
- Order: Neogastropoda
- Superfamily: Turbinelloidea
- Family: Volutomitridae
- Genus: Volutomitra
- Species: V. groenlandica

Binomial name
- Volutomitra groenlandica (Beck in Möller, 1842)

Synonyms
- Mitra groenlandica Beck in Möller, 1842; Volutomitra alaskana Dall, 1902 (junior synonym)

= Volutomitra groenlandica =

Species of gastropod

Volutomitra groenlandica is a species of sea snail, a marine gastropod mollusk in the family Volutomitridae.

== Description ==
The length of the shell varies between 10 mm and 44 mm.

(Original description as Volutomitra alaskana) The shell is fusiform, with about six moderately convex whorls. The suture is distinct. The surface is wholly minutely spirally striated, covered with an olivaceous periostracum over a white or yellowish shell. The aperture is longer than half the total length, with a rather wide siphonal canal, a callous columella and body in the adult, and simple outer lip. The siphonal canal has a well marked siphonal fasciole, and is slightly flexuous. There are normally four plaits, rarely three or five, strong and rather distant. The protoconch is almost always eroded.

== Distribution ==
This marine species occurs off Greenland: West Greenland, East Greenland; Canada: Devon Island, Nova Scotia; Iceland to Novaya Zemlya, Russia.
