= Microvoluta garrardi =

Scientific classification
- Kingdom: Animalia
- Phylum: Mollusca
- Class: Gastropoda
- Subclass: Caenogastropoda
- Order: Neogastropoda
- Family: Volutomitridae
- Genus: Microvoluta
- Species: M. garrardi

Binomial name
- Microvoluta garrardi Cernohorsky, 1975

Species of gastropod

Microvoluta garrardi is a species of sea snail, a marine gastropod mollusk in the family Volutomitridae.
