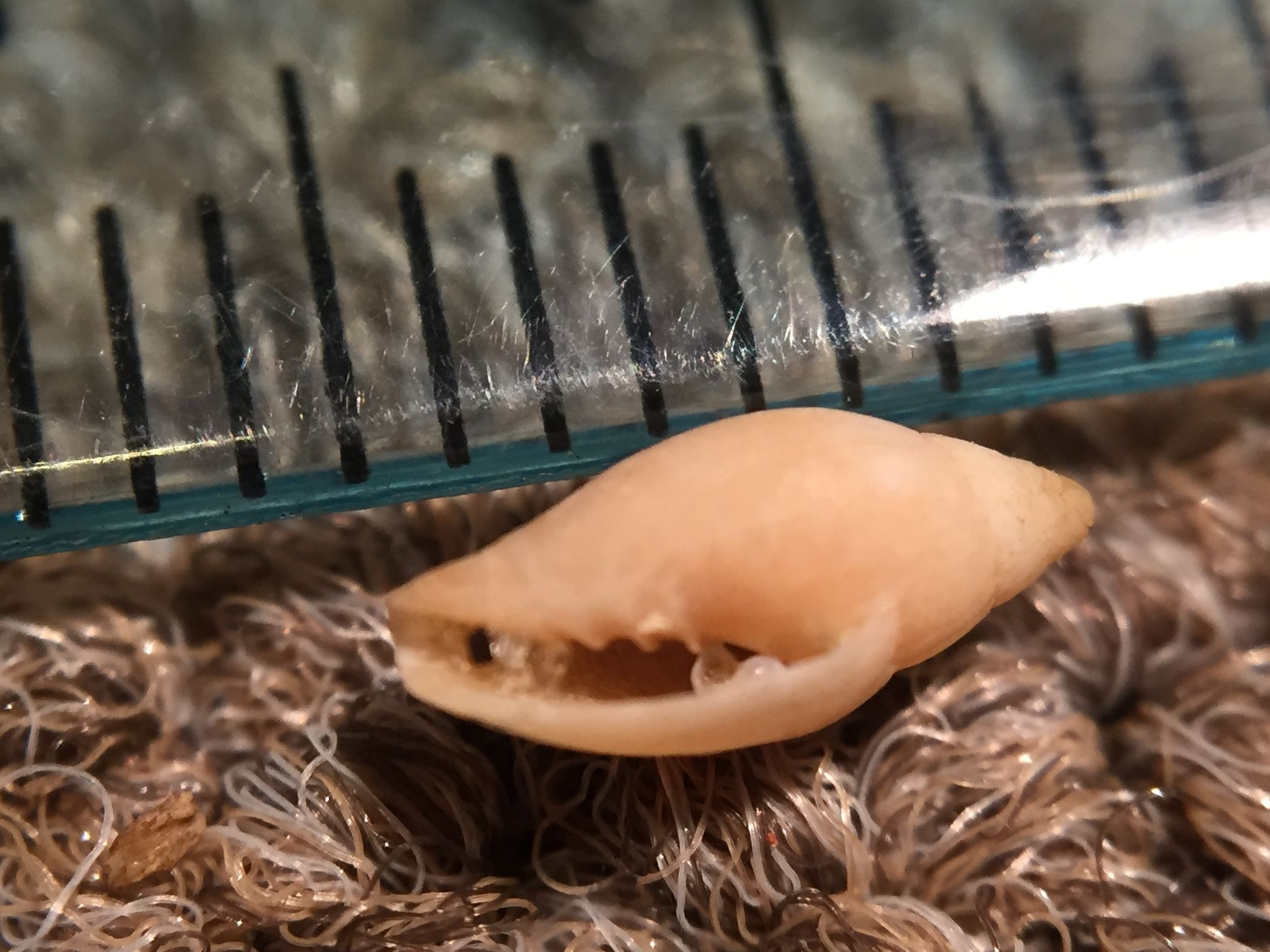

Scientific classification
- Kingdom: Animalia
- Phylum: Mollusca
- Class: Gastropoda
- Subclass: Caenogastropoda
- Order: Neogastropoda
- Family: Volutomitridae
- Genus: Peculator
- Species: P. hedleyi

Binomial name
- Peculator hedleyi (Murdoch, 1905)

Synonyms
- Vulpecula (Pusia) hedleyi Murdoch, 1905; † Mitra bicornis Laws, 1936; Vexillum hedleyi R. Murdoch, 1905; Vulpecula hedleyi Murdoch, 1905

= Peculator hedleyi =

Species of gastropod

Peculator hedleyi is a species of sea snail in the family Volutomitridae. It is named for Charles Hedley.

== Description ==
The length of the shell attains 6.2 mm.

== Distribution ==
This marine species is endemic to New Zealand.
