= P. glabella =

P. glabella may refer to:

- Pellaea glabella, the smooth cliffbrake, a fern species
- Packera glabella, the butterweed, cressleaf groundsel or yellowtop, a plant species native to central and southeastern North America

== See also ==
- Glabella (disambiguation)
