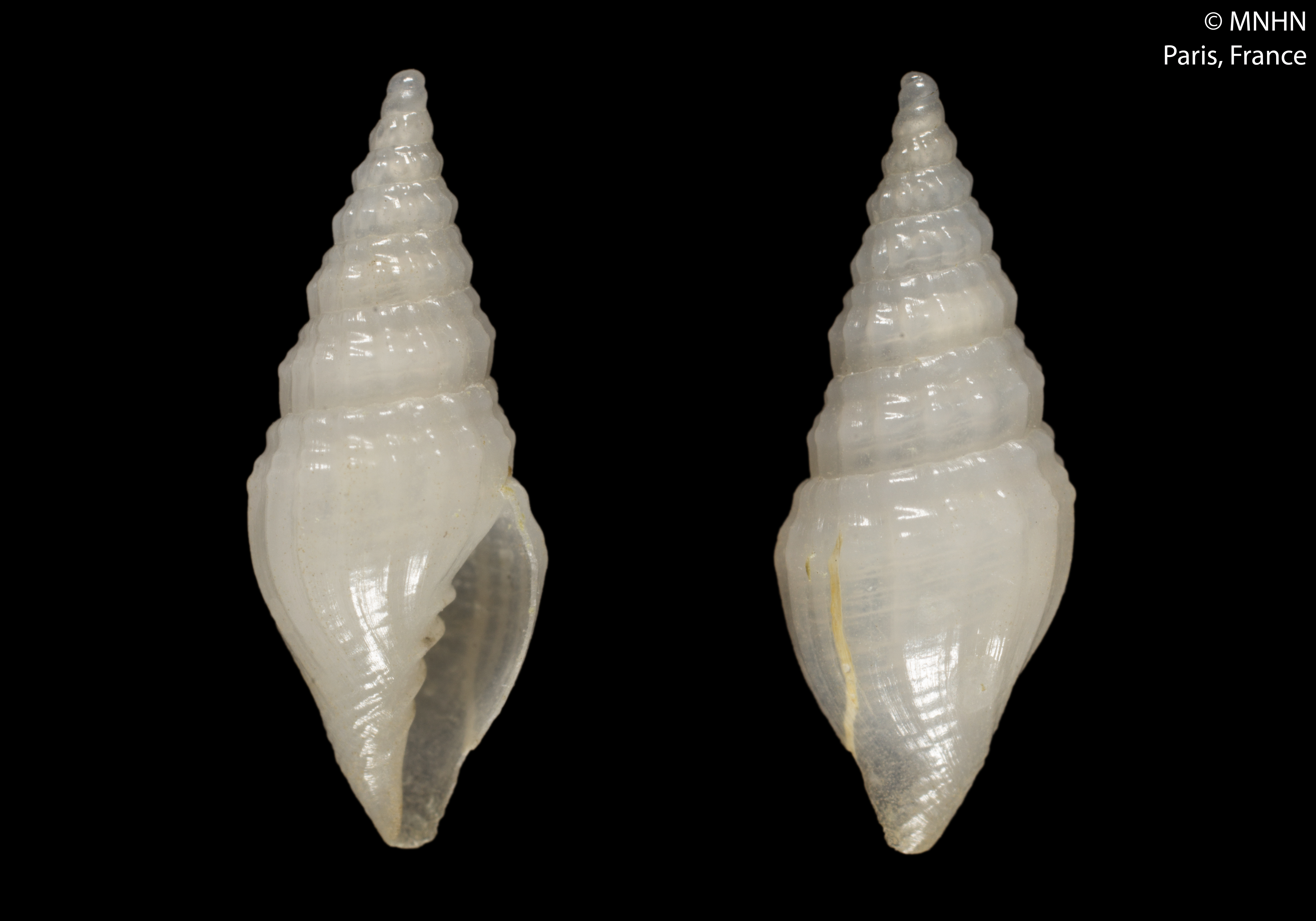
- Shell of Microvoluta dolichura (holotype at MNHN, Paris)

Scientific classification
- Kingdom: Animalia
- Phylum: Mollusca
- Class: Gastropoda
- Subclass: Caenogastropoda
- Order: Neogastropoda
- Family: Volutomitridae
- Genus: Microvoluta
- Species: M. dolichura

Binomial name
- Microvoluta dolichura Bouchet & Kantor, 2004

= Microvoluta dolichura =

Species of gastropod

Microvoluta dolichura is a species of sea snail, a marine gastropod mollusk in the family Volutomitridae.

== Distribution ==
This marine species occurs in the Coral Sea.
