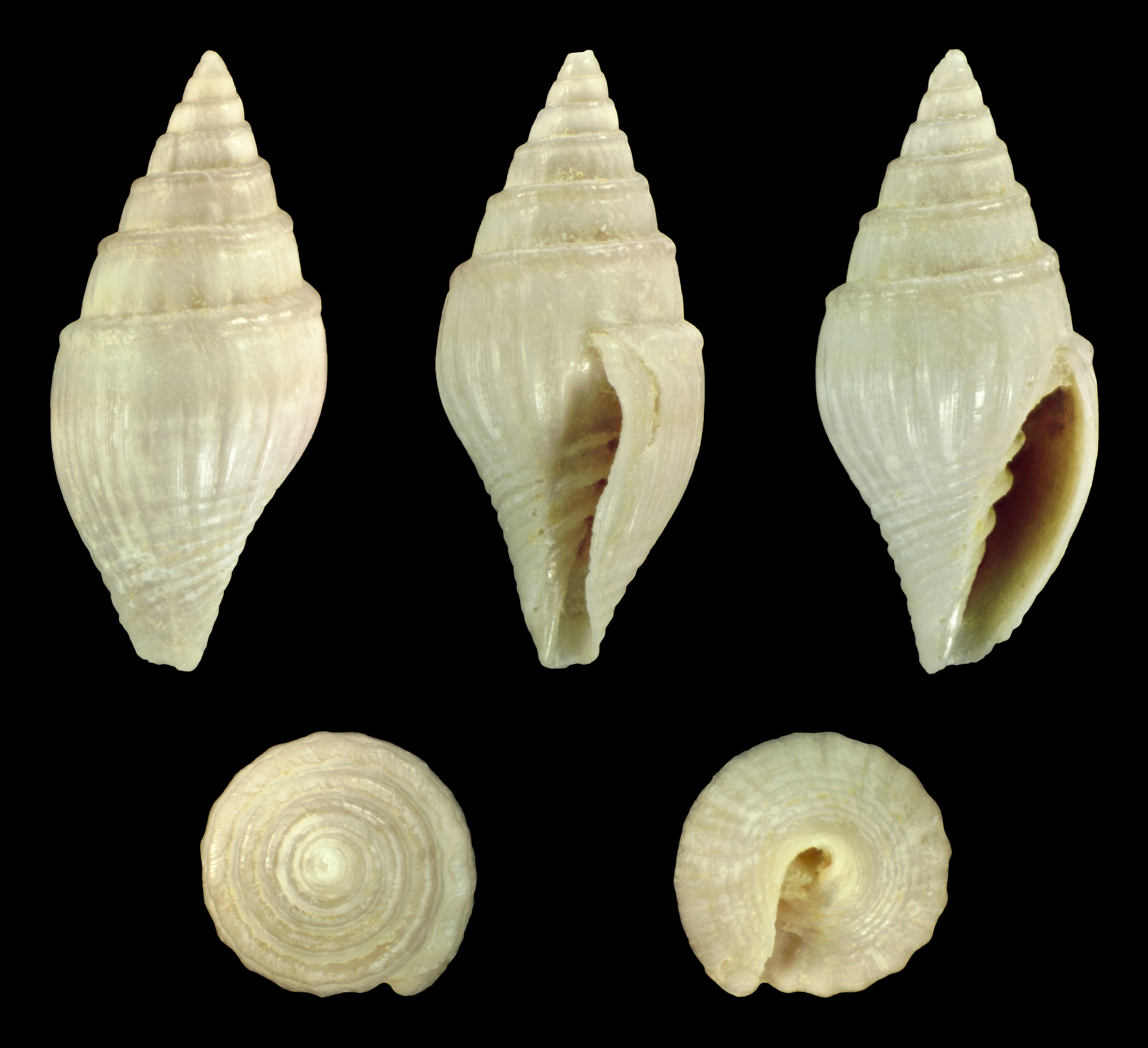
- Shell of † Conomitra fusellina

Scientific classification
- Kingdom: Animalia
- Phylum: Mollusca
- Class: Gastropoda
- Subclass: Caenogastropoda
- Order: Neogastropoda
- Superfamily: Turbinelloidea
- Family: Volutomitridae
- Genus: Conomitra
- Species: †C. fusellina

Binomial name
- †Conomitra fusellina (Lamarck, 1803)

Synonyms
- † Mitra fusellina Lamarck, 1803 superseded combination; Vexillum fusellinum (Lamarck, 1803); Vexillum (Conomitra) fusellinum (Lamarck, 1803)

= Conomitra fusellina =

Species of gastropod

Conomitra fusellina is an extinct species of sea snail, a marine gastropod mollusk, in the family Volutomitridae.

== Distribution ==
Fossils of this marine species were found in Eocene strata in Loire-Atlantique, France.
