= Conomitra lindae =

Scientific classification
- Kingdom: Animalia
- Phylum: Mollusca
- Class: Gastropoda
- Subclass: Caenogastropoda
- Order: Neogastropoda
- Family: Volutomitridae
- Genus: Conomitra
- Species: C. lindae

Binomial name
- Conomitra lindae Petuch, 1987

Species of gastropod

Conomitra lindae is a species of sea snail, a marine gastropod mollusk in the family Volutomitridae.

== Description ==
Original description: "Shell fusiform, biconic, shiny and polished: body with numerous fine axial ribs intersected by numerous spiral ribs; small bead produced at intersection of axial spiral ribs; protoconch large, bulbous, composed of 2 whorls; columella with 4 large plications; color pale tan with 2 bands of arrow-shaped dark brown blotches; shoulder with intermittent dark brown patches; entire color pattern in turn, overlaid with fine spiral bands of tiny, pale tan dots; protoconch brown; interior of aperture tan with 2 dark brown bands."

== Distribution ==
Locus typicus: "Off Cabo La Vela, Goajira Peninsula, Colombia."
