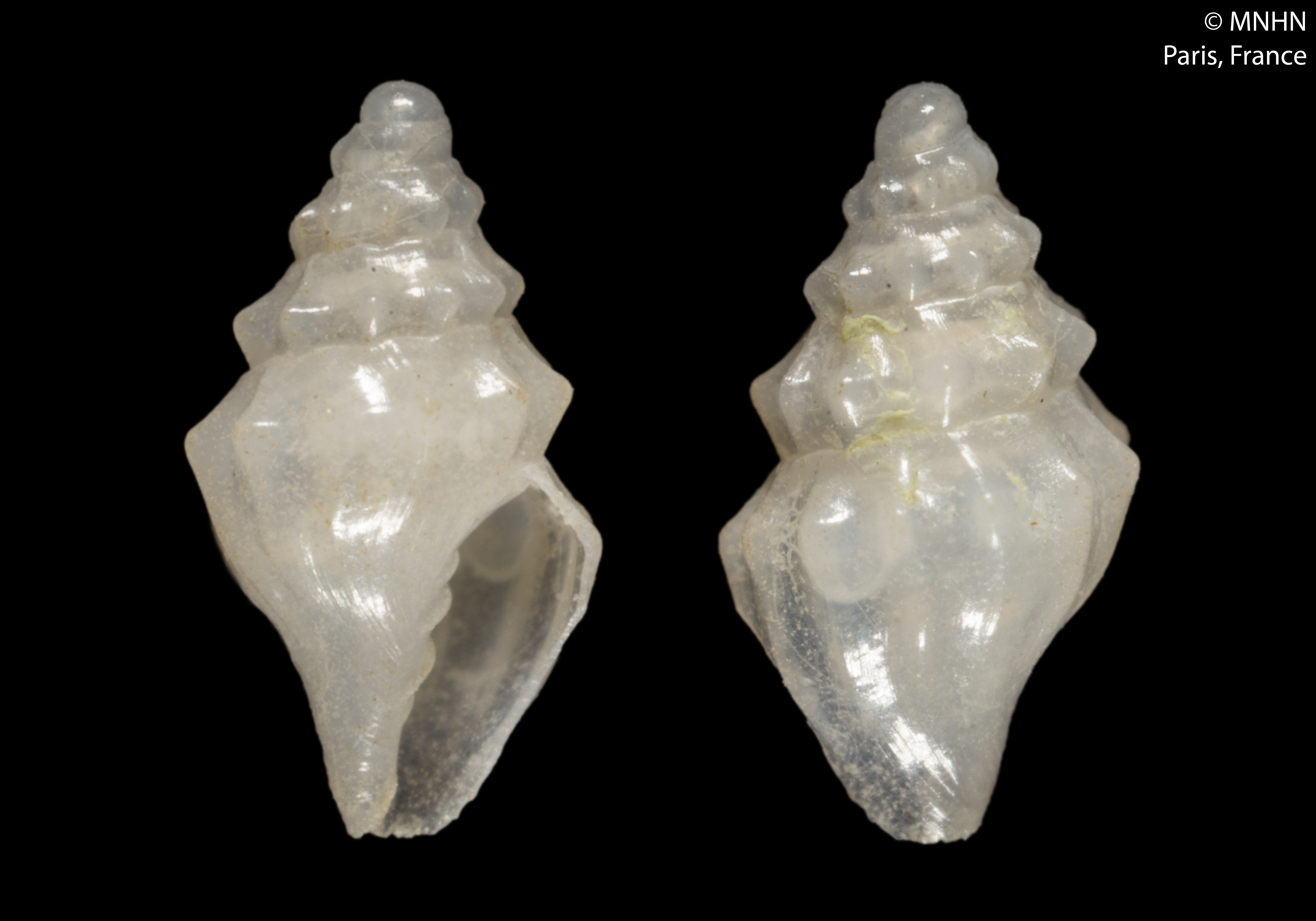
- Shell of Microvoluta engonia (holotype at MNHN, Paris)

Scientific classification
- Kingdom: Animalia
- Phylum: Mollusca
- Class: Gastropoda
- Subclass: Caenogastropoda
- Order: Neogastropoda
- Family: Volutomitridae
- Genus: Microvoluta
- Species: M. engonia

Binomial name
- Microvoluta engonia Bouchet & Kantor, 2004

= Microvoluta engonia =

Species of gastropod

Microvoluta engonia is a species of small sea snail, a marine gastropod mollusk in the family Volutomitridae.

== Description ==
The length of the shell attains 3.75 mm.

It lives on the seafloor.

It is a predator.

== Distribution ==
This marine species occurs off New Caledonia.
