= Amphissa =

Amphissa may refer to:

- Amphissa (city), an alternative writing for Amfissa, a town and a former municipality in Phocis, Greece
- Amphissa (gastropod), a small sea snails genus in the family Columbellidae
- Amphissa (mythology), an incest daughter of Aeolus's son, Macareus, with his sister, Canace, in Greek mythology
- Microvoluta amphissa, a sea snail species
