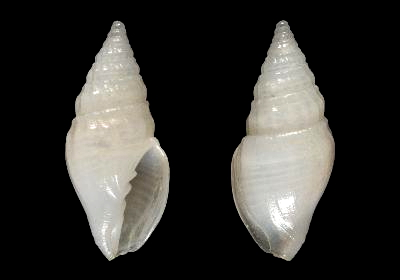
- Shell of Microvoluta cythara (museum specimens at MNHN, Paris)

Scientific classification
- Kingdom: Animalia
- Phylum: Mollusca
- Class: Gastropoda
- Subclass: Caenogastropoda
- Order: Neogastropoda
- Family: Volutomitridae
- Genus: Microvoluta
- Species: M. cythara

Binomial name
- Microvoluta cythara Bouchet & Kantor, 2004

= Microvoluta cythara =

Species of gastropod

Microvoluta cythara is a species of sea snail, a marine gastropod mollusk in the family Volutomitridae.

== Description ==
The length of the shell attains 9.4 mm.

== Distribution ==
This species occurs in the Coral Sea and off New Caledonia.
