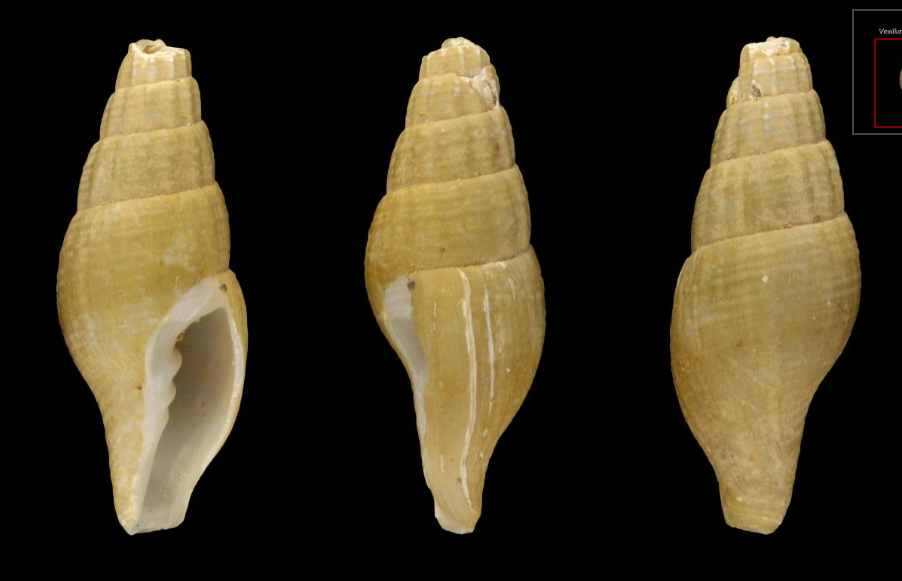
- Shell of Volutomitra pailoloana (holotype at the Smithsonian Institution)

Scientific classification
- Kingdom: Animalia
- Phylum: Mollusca
- Class: Gastropoda
- Subclass: Caenogastropoda
- Order: Neogastropoda
- Superfamily: Turbinelloidea
- Family: Volutomitridae
- Genus: Volutomitra
- Species: V. pailoloana

Binomial name
- Volutomitra pailoloana (J. Cate, 1963)

Synonyms
- Vexillum pailoloana J. Cate, 1963

= Volutomitra pailoloana =

Species of gastropod

Volutomitra pailoloana is a species of sea snail, a marine gastropod mollusk in the family Volutomitridae.

== Description ==
The length of the shell attains 18 mm.

== Distribution ==
This marine species occurs off Hawaii.
