= Conomitra caribbeana =

Scientific classification
- Kingdom: Animalia
- Phylum: Mollusca
- Class: Gastropoda
- Subclass: Caenogastropoda
- Order: Neogastropoda
- Family: Volutomitridae
- Genus: Conomitra
- Species: C. caribbeana

Binomial name
- Conomitra caribbeana Weinsbord, 1929

Species of gastropod

Conomitra caribbeana is a species of sea snail, a marine gastropod mollusk in the family Volutomitridae.
