= Paradmete arnaudi =

Scientific classification
- Kingdom: Animalia
- Phylum: Mollusca
- Class: Gastropoda
- Subclass: Caenogastropoda
- Order: Neogastropoda
- Family: Volutomitridae
- Genus: Paradmete
- Species: P. arnaudi

Binomial name
- Paradmete arnaudi Numanami, 1996

Species of gastropod

Paradmete arnaudi is a species of sea snail, a marine gastropod mollusc in the family Volutomitridae.
