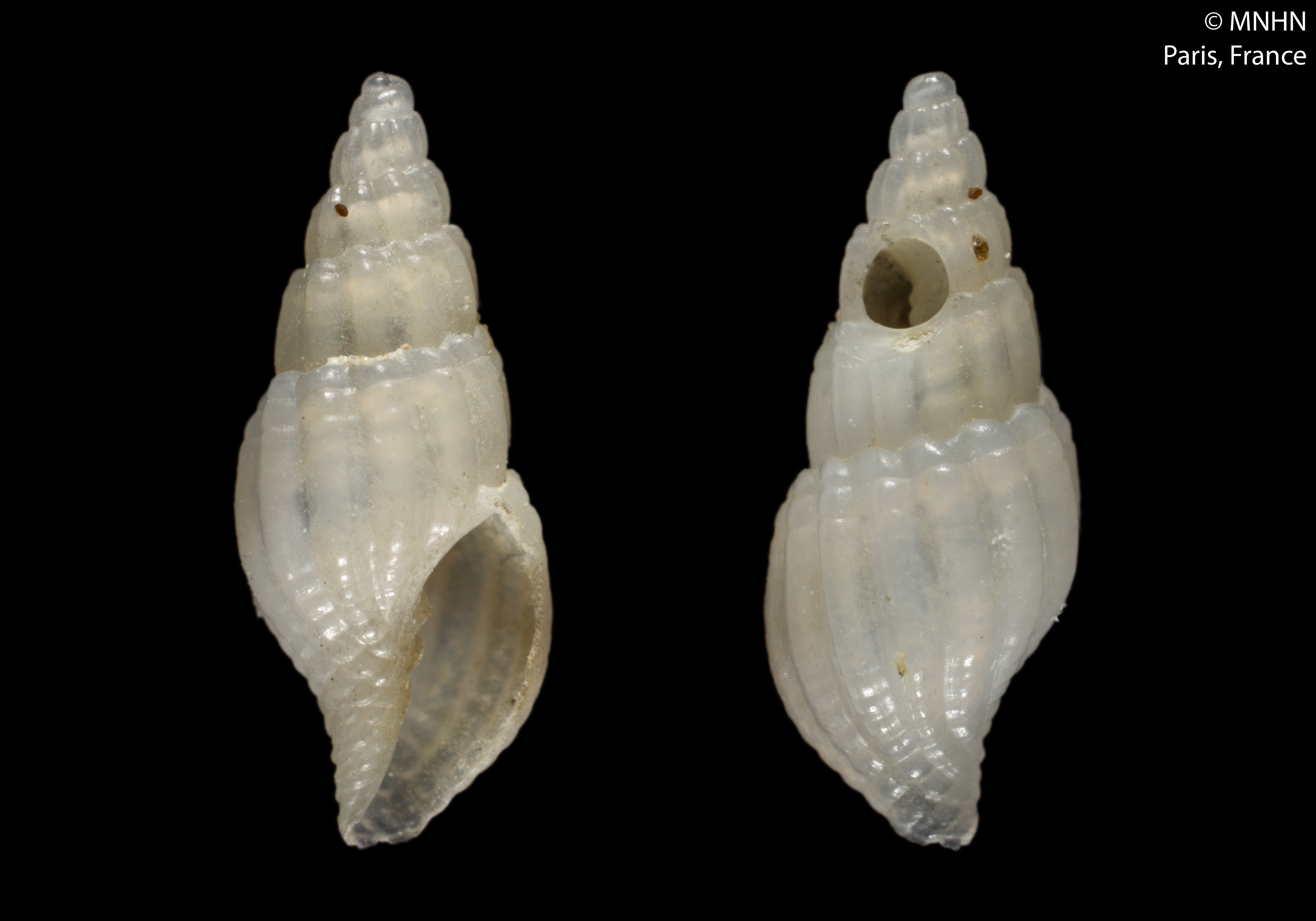
- Shell of Microvoluta superstes (holotype at MNHN, Paris)

Scientific classification
- Kingdom: Animalia
- Phylum: Mollusca
- Class: Gastropoda
- Subclass: Caenogastropoda
- Order: Neogastropoda
- Family: Volutomitridae
- Genus: Microvoluta
- Species: M. superstes

Binomial name
- Microvoluta superstes Bouchet & Warén, 1985

= Microvoluta superstes =

Species of gastropod

Microvoluta superstes is a species of small sea snail, a marine gastropod mollusk in the family Volutomitridae.

== Description ==
The length of the shell attains 5.5 mm. The shell has an ovate-conical shape and is white in color.

== Distribution ==
This species occurs in the Atlantic Ocean on the Josephine seamount off Portugal.
