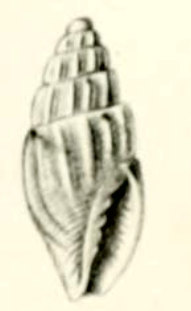
- Drawing of Volutomitra geoffreyana (holotype)

Scientific classification
- Kingdom: Animalia
- Phylum: Mollusca
- Class: Gastropoda
- Subclass: Caenogastropoda
- Order: Neogastropoda
- Superfamily: Turbinelloidea
- Family: Volutomitridae
- Genus: Volutomitra
- Species: V. geoffreyana

Binomial name
- Volutomitra geoffreyana (Melvill, 1910)

Synonyms
- Mitra (Pusia) geoffreyana Melvill, 1910 superseded combination; Vexillum geoffreyanum (Melvill, 1910)

= Volutomitra geoffreyana =

Species of gastropod

Volutomitra geoffreyana is a species of sea snail, a marine gastropod mollusk in the family Volutomitridae.

== Description ==
The length of the shell attains 32 mm.

The white shell is narrow and fusiform. The shell contains six whorls, of which two bulbous whorls in the protoconch. The whorls are extremely gradate with smooth ribs. The interstices are apparently likewise smooth, but with a powerful lens most delicate spiral striation is observable. With age, however, these striae wear off. The narrow aperture is oblong. The outer lip is thin.

This pretty little species is well differentiated by its four columellar plaits, all of equal size and similar convolution. The ochre-brown spotting on an otherwise pure white ground, principally at the point of junction of the outer lip with the body whorl and on the summit of every third rib just below the sutures on the penultimate and body whorls, is peculiar.

== Distribution ==
This marine species occurs in the Persian Gulf.
