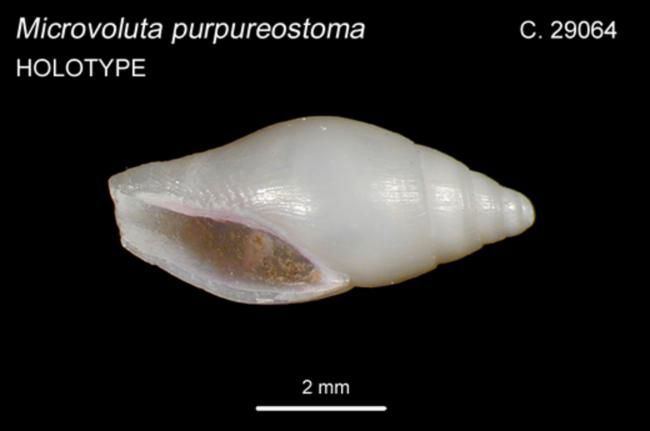

Scientific classification
- Kingdom: Animalia
- Phylum: Mollusca
- Class: Gastropoda
- Subclass: Caenogastropoda
- Order: Neogastropoda
- Family: Volutomitridae
- Genus: Microvoluta
- Species: M. australis

Binomial name
- Microvoluta australis Angas, 1877

Synonyms
- Microvoluta purpureostoma Hedley & May 1908; Voluta minima Sowerby, 1887

= Microvoluta australis =

Species of gastropod

Microvoluta australis is a species of sea snail, a marine gastropod mollusk in the family Volutomitridae.
