= Conomitra alabaster =

Scientific classification
- Kingdom: Animalia
- Phylum: Mollusca
- Class: Gastropoda
- Subclass: Caenogastropoda
- Order: Neogastropoda
- Family: Volutomitridae
- Genus: Conomitra
- Species: C. alabaster

Binomial name
- Conomitra alabaster (Sowerby, 1900)

Species of gastropod

Conomitra alabaster is a species of sea snail, a marine gastropod mollusc in the family Mitridae, the miters or miter snails.
