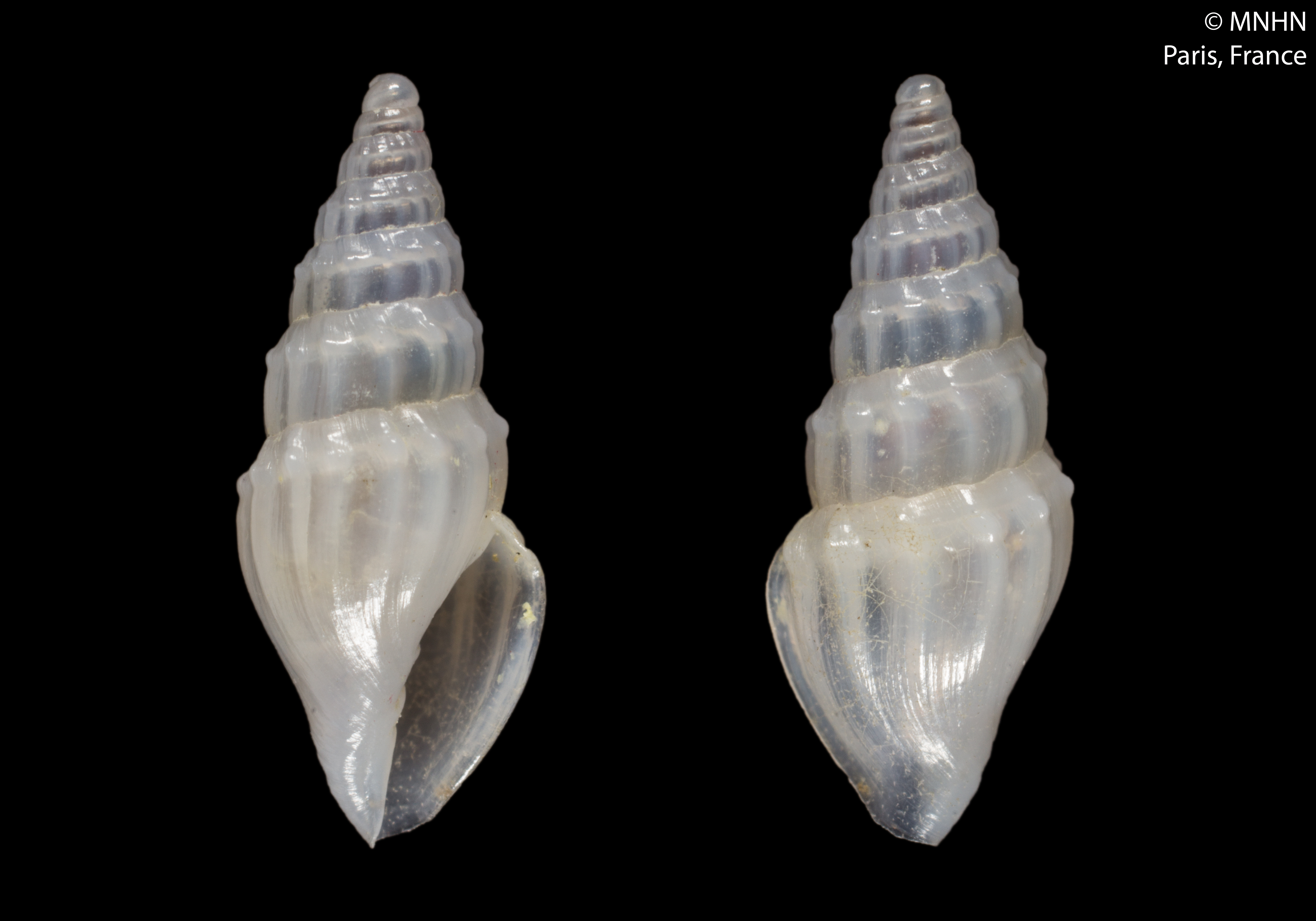
- Shell of Microvoluta respergens (holotype at MNHN, Paris)

Scientific classification
- Kingdom: Animalia
- Phylum: Mollusca
- Class: Gastropoda
- Subclass: Caenogastropoda
- Order: Neogastropoda
- Family: Volutomitridae
- Genus: Microvoluta
- Species: M. respergens

Binomial name
- Microvoluta respergens Bouchet & Kantor, 2004

= Microvoluta respergens =

Species of gastropod

Microvoluta respergens is a species of small sea snail, a marine gastropod mollusk in the family Volutomitridae.

== Description ==
Microvoluta respergens is a species of small sea snail, a marine gastropod mollusk in the family Volutomitridae. The shell reaches a length of approximately 9.3 mm and displays a slender, elongated shape with a high spire and narrow aperture. The shell surface is smooth and glossy, typically pale in color. The protoconch consists of about 1.5 whorls, smoothly transitioning into the teleoconch, which features convex whorls with fine axial and spiral sculpture. The outer lip is thin and slightly curved, and the columella bears several oblique folds.

== Distribution ==
This species is endemic to the marine waters off New Caledonia in the South Pacific. It inhabits deep-sea environments at depths between 250 and 750 meters.

== Ecology ==
Microvoluta respergens is presumed to be carnivorous, feeding on small invertebrates typical of deep-sea benthic ecosystems. Due to the difficulty of sampling at such depths, little is known about its specific behavior and reproductive biology.

== Conservation ==
As of 2025, there is no formal conservation assessment for this species. However, its limited distribution and habitat specialization may make it vulnerable to environmental disturbances such as deep-sea trawling and seabed mining.

== Distribution ==
This marine species occurs off New Caledonia.
