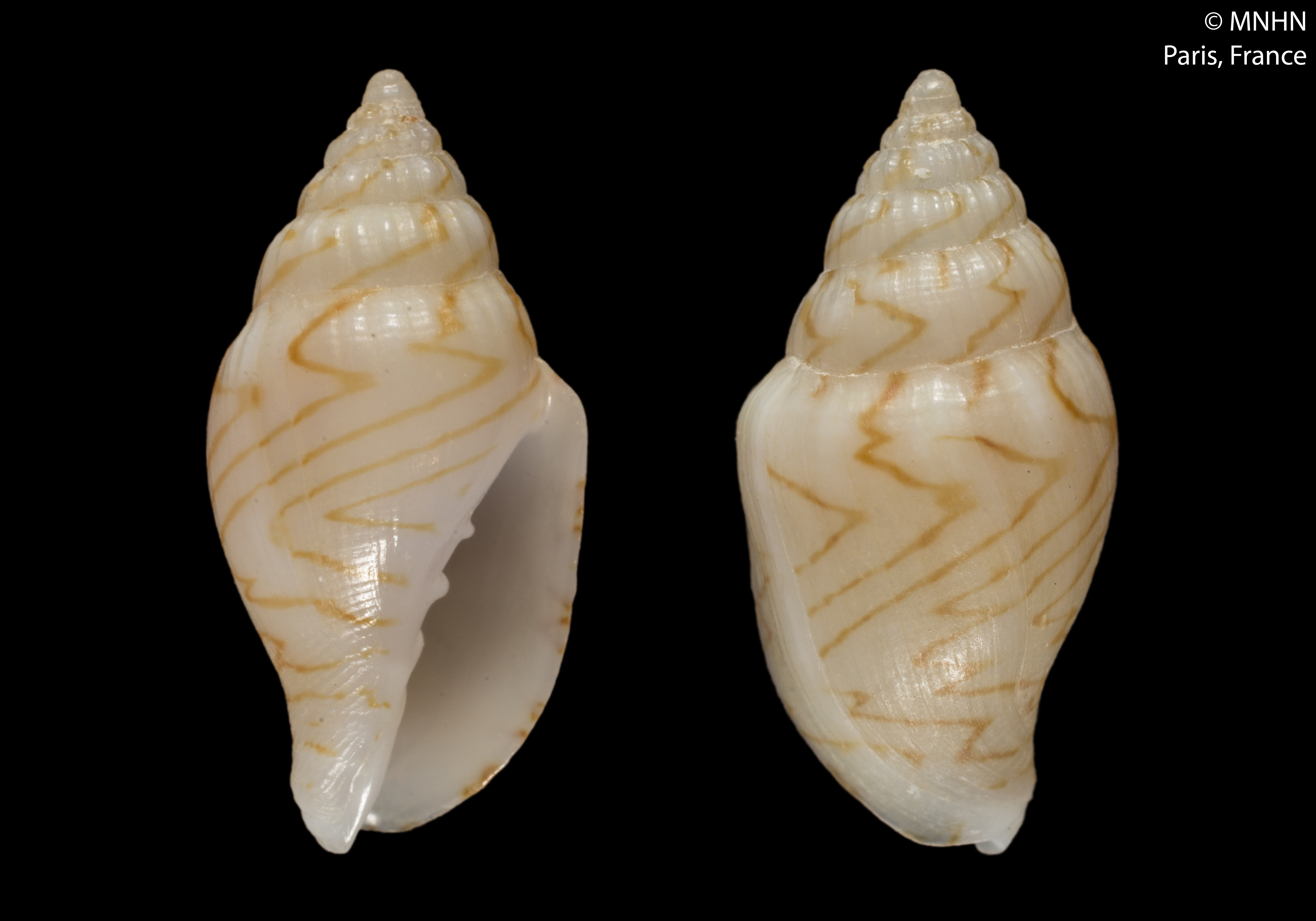
- Shell of Volutomitra ziczac (holotype at MNHN, paris)

Scientific classification
- Kingdom: Animalia
- Phylum: Mollusca
- Class: Gastropoda
- Subclass: Caenogastropoda
- Order: Neogastropoda
- Superfamily: Turbinelloidea
- Family: Volutomitridae
- Genus: Volutomitra
- Species: V. ziczac

Binomial name
- Volutomitra ziczac Bouchet & Kantor, 2004

= Volutomitra ziczac =

Species of gastropod

Volutomitra ziczac is a species of sea snail, a marine gastropod mollusk in the family Volutomitridae.

== Description ==
The length of the shell attains 14 mm.

== Distribution ==
This marine species occurs in the Western Central Pacific off New Caledonia at a depth of 350-450 meters.
