= Microvoluta marginata =

Scientific classification
- Kingdom: Animalia
- Phylum: Mollusca
- Class: Gastropoda
- Subclass: Caenogastropoda
- Order: Neogastropoda
- Family: Volutomitridae
- Genus: Microvoluta
- Species: M. marginata

Binomial name
- Microvoluta marginata (Hutton, 1885)

Synonyms
- Microvoluta cuvierensis Finlay, 1930; Turricula lincta Hutton, 1885; Turricula marginata Hutton, 1885; Vulpecula (Pusia) biconica R. Murdoch & Suter, 1906; Vulpecula biconica Murdoch & Suter, 1906; Vulpecula marginata (Hutton, 1885)

Species of gastropod

Microvoluta marginata is a species of medium-sized sea snail, a marine gastropod mollusc in the family Volutomitridae, the mitres.

== Description ==
The length of the shell attains 6 mm.

== Distribution ==
It is only known to occur in Manawatāwhi / Three Kings Islands, North Island, Stewart Island, Southern South Island and Mernoo bank in the country of New Zealand.

== Anatomy ==
Their anatomy is noted to be the height of 8 mm and the width of 3.5 mm.
