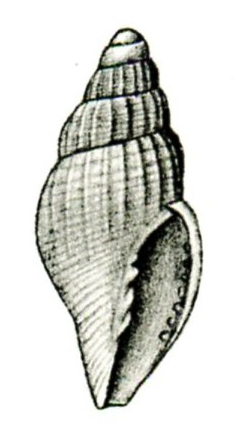
- Shell of Volutomitra hottentota (holotype)

Scientific classification
- Kingdom: Animalia
- Phylum: Mollusca
- Class: Gastropoda
- Subclass: Caenogastropoda
- Order: Neogastropoda
- Superfamily: Turbinelloidea
- Family: Volutomitridae
- Genus: Volutomitra
- Species: V. hottentotta

Binomial name
- Volutomitra hottentotta (Thiele, 1925)

Synonyms
- Turricula hottentota Thiele, 1925 · unaccepted (original combination); Turricula hottentotta Thiele, 1925 (misspelling)

= Volutomitra hottentota =

Species of gastropod

Volutomitra hottentotta is a species of sea snail, a marine gastropod mollusk in the family Volutomitridae.
