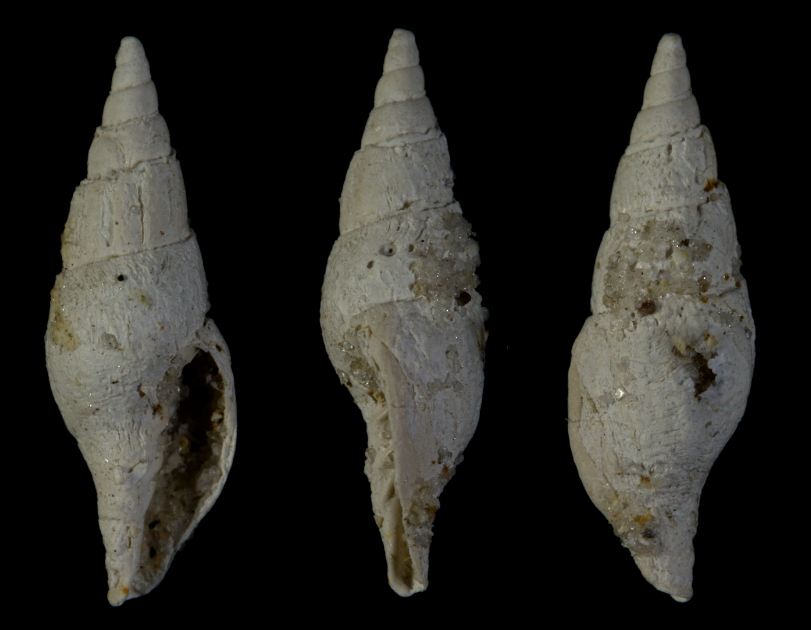
- Shell of † Conomitra wateleti (specimen at MNHN, Paris)

Scientific classification
- Kingdom: Animalia
- Phylum: Mollusca
- Class: Gastropoda
- Subclass: Caenogastropoda
- Order: Neogastropoda
- Superfamily: Turbinelloidea
- Family: Volutomitridae
- Genus: Conomitra
- Species: C. wateleti

Binomial name
- Conomitra wateleti (Briart & Cornet, 1870)

Synonyms
- † Mitra wateleti Briart & Cornet, 1870

= Conomitra wateleti =

Species of gastropod

Conomitra wateleti is an extinct species of sea snail, a marine gastropod mollusk in the family Clavatulidae.

== Description ==
The small shell is elongated and fusiform. The acute spire is composed of seven slightly rounded whorls, winding regularly. They are separated by deep linear sutures. The shell is usually shiny and smooth, showing only a few creases, and at the anterior part of the base some longitudinal there are very thin folds, which can only be seen with a magnifying glass. The aperture is oval, narrow, elongated and oblique. It has a sharp straight lip, thickened on the inside, broadly arched to near the anterior notch where it tucks a little into the opening. The columellar lip is very inflected at the base of the columella, almost straight from this inflection to the anterior end. A slight bead starts from the notch, goes around the columella from which it is separated, at the anterior part by a slight longitudinal depression. The pointed columella bears on the posterior half three oblique, sharp folds, the strongest behind, the others decreasing gradually.

== Distribution ==
Fossils of this marine species were found in Paleocene strata in Champagne-Ardenne, France.
