= Paradmete percarinata =

Scientific classification
- Kingdom: Animalia
- Phylum: Mollusca
- Class: Gastropoda
- Subclass: Caenogastropoda
- Order: Neogastropoda
- Family: Volutomitridae
- Genus: Paradmete
- Species: P. percarinata

Binomial name
- Paradmete percarinata Powell, 1951

Species of gastropod

Paradmete percarinata is a species of sea snail, a marine gastropod mollusc in the family Volutomitridae.
