= Microvoluta veldhoveni =

Scientific classification
- Kingdom: Animalia
- Phylum: Mollusca
- Class: Gastropoda
- Subclass: Caenogastropoda
- Order: Neogastropoda
- Family: Volutomitridae
- Genus: Microvoluta
- Species: M. veldhoveni

Binomial name
- Microvoluta veldhoveni Jong & Coomans, 1988

Synonyms
- Pusiolina veldhoveni Jong & Coomans, 1988

Species of gastropod

Microvoluta veldhoveni is a species of sea snail, a marine gastropod mollusk in the family Volutomitridae. The species locality is Curaçao; it has also been recorded from Aruba.
