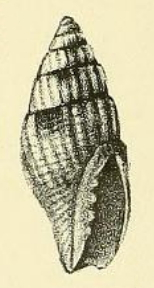
- Drawing of a shell of Volutomitra blanfordi (holotype)

Scientific classification
- Kingdom: Animalia
- Phylum: Mollusca
- Class: Gastropoda
- Subclass: Caenogastropoda
- Order: Neogastropoda
- Superfamily: Turbinelloidea
- Family: Volutomitridae
- Genus: Volutomitra
- Species: V. blanfordi

Binomial name
- Volutomitra blanfordi (Melvill & Standen, 1901

Synonyms
- Mitra (Pusia) blanfordi Melvill & Standen, 1901 (basionym); Mitra blanfordi Melvill & Standen, 1901 (original combination); Vexillum (Pusia) blanfordi (Melvill & Standen, 1901); Vexillum blanfordi (Melvill & Standen, 1901) ·

= Volutomitra blanfordi =

Species of gastropod

Volutomitra blanfordi is a species of small sea snail, marine gastropod mollusk in the family Volutomitridae.

== Description ==
Volutomitra blanfordi is a small species. The length of the shell varies between 4 mm and 6 mm.

The solid spire is oblong-fusiform and turreted. It is dark white with irregular brown spots. The shell contains six whorls of which two in the protoconch. The remainder are closely longitudinally ribbed, most frequently vanishing on the body whorl, transversely obscurely but closely lirate. The aperture is narrow. The columellar margin is incrassate with four folds. It is not unlike Mitra (Chrysame) tiarella in miniature, but its structure is that of a Pusia.

== Distribution ==
This marine species occurs in the Gulf of Oman.
