= Microvoluta royana =

Scientific classification
- Kingdom: Animalia
- Phylum: Mollusca
- Class: Gastropoda
- Subclass: Caenogastropoda
- Order: Neogastropoda
- Family: Volutomitridae
- Genus: Microvoluta
- Species: M. royana

Binomial name
- Microvoluta royana Iredale, 1924

Synonyms
- Mitra jervisensis Laseron, 1951

Species of gastropod

Microvoluta royana is a species of small sea snail, a marine gastropod mollusk in the family Volutomitridae.

== Description ==
Shell with spire straight sided or slightly convex, whorls rounded, aperture about one-third of total shell length. Sculptured with fine spiral grooves over the whole surface, 20–25 on body whorl. Axial sculpture of growth striae, or poorly defined axial ribs. Columella with four strong plaits, the two uppermost stronger. Outer lip constricted towards base, sinuous in profile, usually lirate deep within aperture. Colour whitish to fawn, with irregular axial zigzag streaks and brown blotches.

== Distribution ==
This species is endemic to Australia; Fraser Island, Queensland, to Lakes Entrance, Victoria.

== Size ==
The shell of this species is up to 12 mm in length.

== Habitat ==
Known from 14–143 metres. Uncommon.

== Comparison ==
This species is similar to M. australis, but differs by having the aperture about one-third of shell length, more prominent spiral sculpture, and the outer lip constricted at the base.
