= Microvoluta miranda =

Scientific classification
- Kingdom: Animalia
- Phylum: Mollusca
- Class: Gastropoda
- Subclass: Caenogastropoda
- Order: Neogastropoda
- Family: Volutomitridae
- Genus: Microvoluta
- Species: M. miranda

Binomial name
- Microvoluta miranda (E.A. Smith, 1891)

Synonyms
- Microvoluta ponderi Cernohorsky, 1975; Mitra miranda E.A. Smith, 1891

Species of gastropod

Microvoluta miranda is a species of sea snail, a marine gastropod mollusk in the family Volutomitridae.
