= Conomitra leonardhilli =

Scientific classification
- Kingdom: Animalia
- Phylum: Mollusca
- Class: Gastropoda
- Subclass: Caenogastropoda
- Order: Neogastropoda
- Family: Volutomitridae
- Genus: Conomitra
- Species: C. leonardhilli

Binomial name
- Conomitra leonardhilli Petuch, 1987

Species of gastropod

Conomitra leonardhilli is a species of sea snail, a marine gastropod mollusk in the family Volutomitridae.

== Description ==
Original description: "Shell fusiform, biconic; body with numerous fine axial ribs, running from suture to siphonal canal; axial ribs intersected by numerous spiral cords, giving shell reticulated sculpture; protoconch large, bulbous, composed of 2 whorls; aperture narrow; columella with 4 large plications; shell color white or pale cream-tan with numerous, reddish-brown zig-zag flammules; protoconch and interior of aperture white."

== Distribution ==
Locus typicus: "Golfo de Triste, off Puerto Cabello,
Venezuela, South America."
