= Paradmete curta =

Scientific classification
- Kingdom: Animalia
- Phylum: Mollusca
- Class: Gastropoda
- Subclass: Caenogastropoda
- Order: Neogastropoda
- Family: Volutomitridae
- Genus: Paradmete
- Species: P. curta

Binomial name
- Paradmete curta (Strebel, 1908)

Synonyms
- Cancellaria curta Strebel, 1908; Cancellaria longicauda Strebel, 1908; Paradmete longicauda (Strebel, 1908); Volutomitra curta (Strebel, 1908)

Species of gastropod

Paradmete curta is a species of sea snail, a marine gastropod mollusc in the family Volutomitridae.
