= Paradmete fragillima =

Scientific classification
- Kingdom: Animalia
- Phylum: Mollusca
- Class: Gastropoda
- Subclass: Caenogastropoda
- Order: Neogastropoda
- Family: Volutomitridae
- Genus: Paradmete
- Species: P. fragillima

Binomial name
- Paradmete fragillima (Watson, 1882)

Synonyms
- Cancellaria typical Strebel, 1908; Volutomitra fragillima Watson, 1882

Species of gastropod

Paradmete fragillima is a species of sea snail, a marine gastropod mollusc in the family Volutomitridae.
