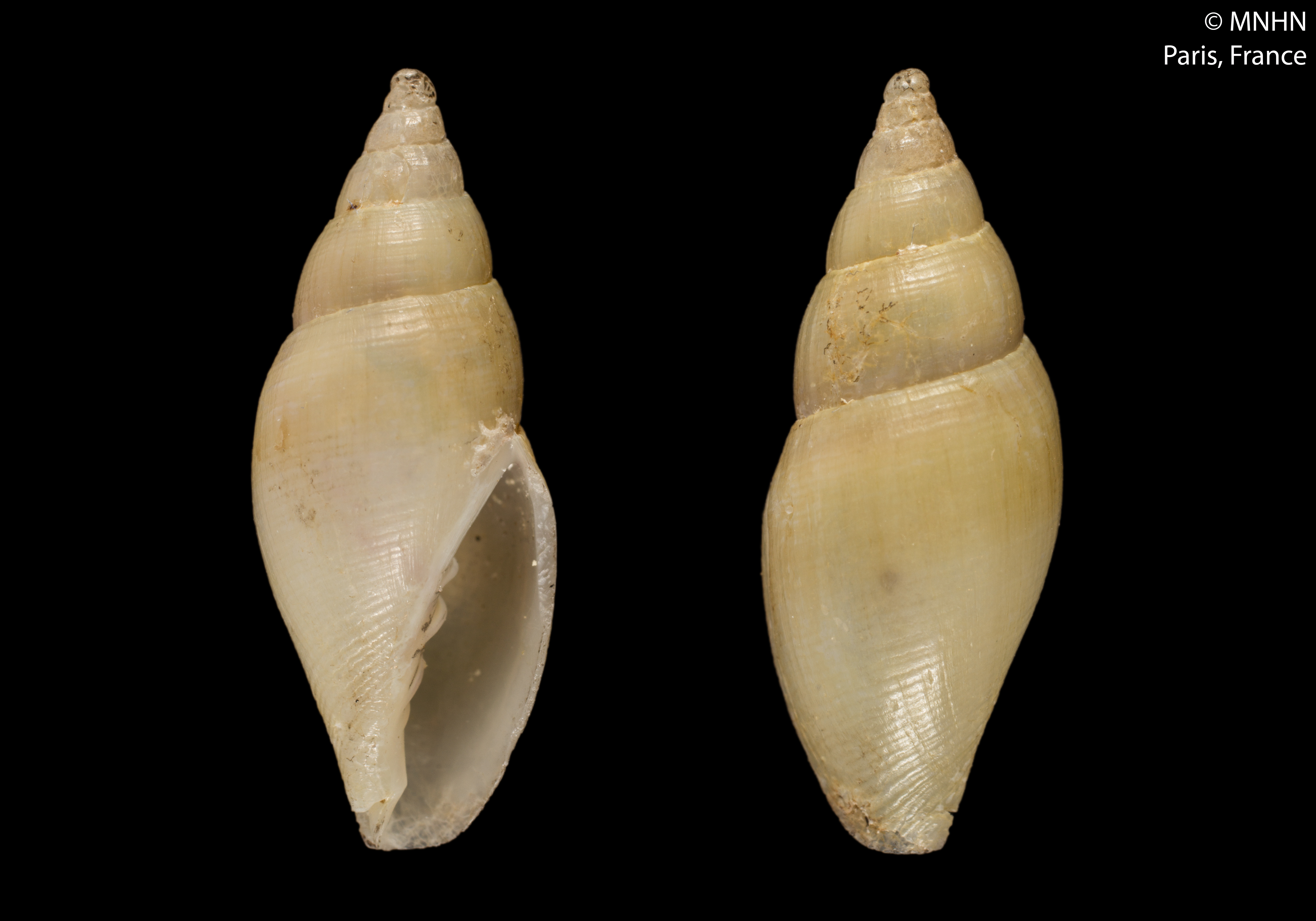
- Paradmete crymochara

Scientific classification
- Kingdom: Animalia
- Phylum: Mollusca
- Class: Gastropoda
- Subclass: Caenogastropoda
- Order: Neogastropoda
- Superfamily: Turbinelloidea
- Family: Volutomitridae
- Genus: Paradmete; Strebel, 1908

Type species
- Cancellaria typica Strebel, 1908

= Paradmete =

Genus of sea snails

Paradmete is a genus of sea snails, marine gastropod mollusks in the family Volutomitridae.

== Species ==
Species within the genus Paradmete include:

- Paradmete arnaudi Numanami, 1996
- Paradmete breidensis Numanami, 1996
- Paradmete cryptomara (Rochebrune & Mabille, 1885)
- Paradmete curta (Strebel, 1908)
- Paradmete fragillima (Watson, 1882)
- Paradmete percarinata Powell, 1951

Synonyms

- Paradmete longicauda (Strebel, 1908): synonym of Paradmete curta (Strebel, 1908)
