= Peculator obconicus =

Scientific classification
- Kingdom: Animalia
- Phylum: Mollusca
- Class: Gastropoda
- Subclass: Caenogastropoda
- Order: Neogastropoda
- Family: Volutomitridae
- Genus: Peculator
- Species: P. obconicus

Binomial name
- Peculator obconicus (Powell, 1952)

Synonyms
- Microvoluta obconica Powell, 1952

Species of gastropod

Peculator obconicus is a species of sea snail in the family Volutomitridae. It is endemic to the waters off New Zealand.
