= Magdalemitra =

Scientific classification
- Kingdom: Animalia
- Phylum: Mollusca
- Class: Gastropoda
- Subclass: Caenogastropoda
- Order: Neogastropoda
- Family: Volutomitridae
- Genus: Magdalemitra; Kilburn, 1974

Genus of sea snails

Magdalemitra is a genus of sea snails, marine gastropod mollusks in the family Volutomitridae.

== Species ==
Species within the genus Magdalemitra include:

- Magdalemitra gilesorum Kilburn, 1974
