= Microvoluta blakeana =

Scientific classification
- Kingdom: Animalia
- Phylum: Mollusca
- Class: Gastropoda
- Subclass: Caenogastropoda
- Order: Neogastropoda
- Family: Volutomitridae
- Genus: Microvoluta
- Species: M. blakeana

Binomial name
- Microvoluta blakeana (Dall, 1889)

Synonyms
- Conomitra blakeana Dall, 1889

Species of gastropod

Microvoluta blakeana is a species of sea snail, a marine gastropod mollusk in the family Volutomitridae.
