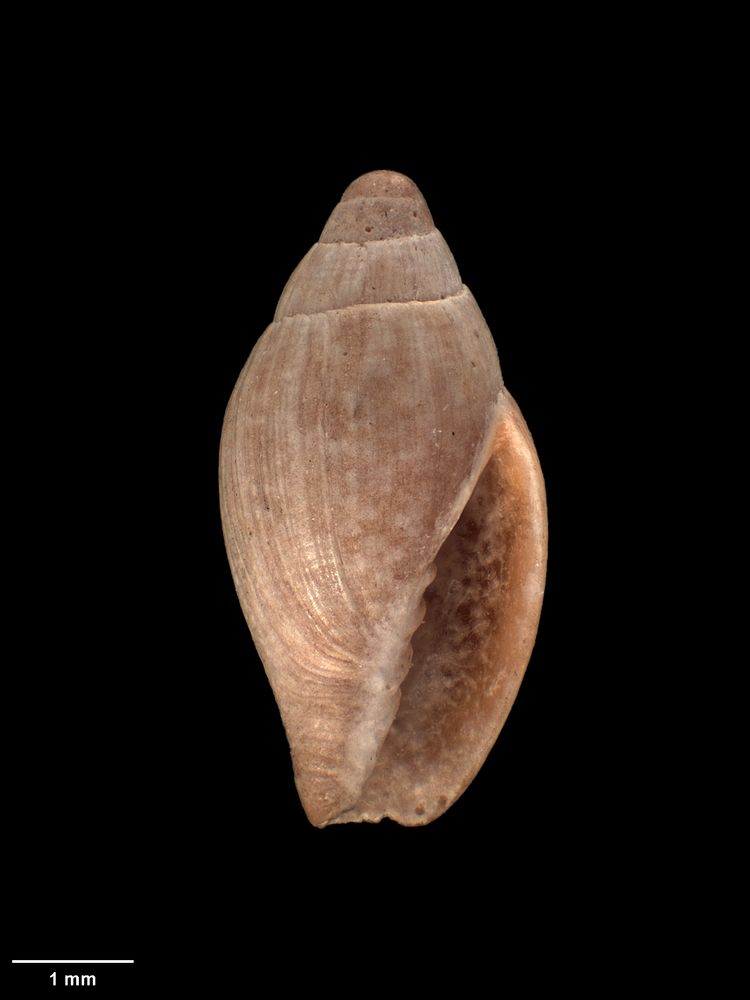
- Peculator hedleyi, a member of the genus

Scientific classification
- Kingdom: Animalia
- Phylum: Mollusca
- Class: Gastropoda
- Subclass: Caenogastropoda
- Order: Neogastropoda
- Family: Volutomitridae
- Genus: Peculator; Iredale, 1924

Type species
- Peculator verconis Iredale, 1924

Species
- 10 extant species (see text)

= Peculator (gastropod) =

Peculator Temporal range: Bartonian–recent

Genus of sea snails

Peculator is a genus of sea snails in the family Volutomitridae, one family of mitres.

They are known from waters of New Zealand, Australia, and the Malay Archipelago.

== Species ==
There are ten recognized extant species within the genus Peculator:

- Peculator bacatus Cernohorsky, 1980
- Peculator chrisclarkeae Marrow, 2025
- Peculator coma (Odhner, 1924)
- Peculator gigas Marrow, 2025
- Peculator hedleyi (Murdoch, 1905)
- Peculator obconicus (A. W. B. Powell, 1952)
- Peculator porphyria (Verco, 1896)
- Peculator pseudoverconis Marrow, 2025
- Peculator verconis Iredale, 1924
- Peculator westralis Marrow, 2025

Species only known from the fossil record include the following:

- †Peculator cassida (Tate, 1889)
