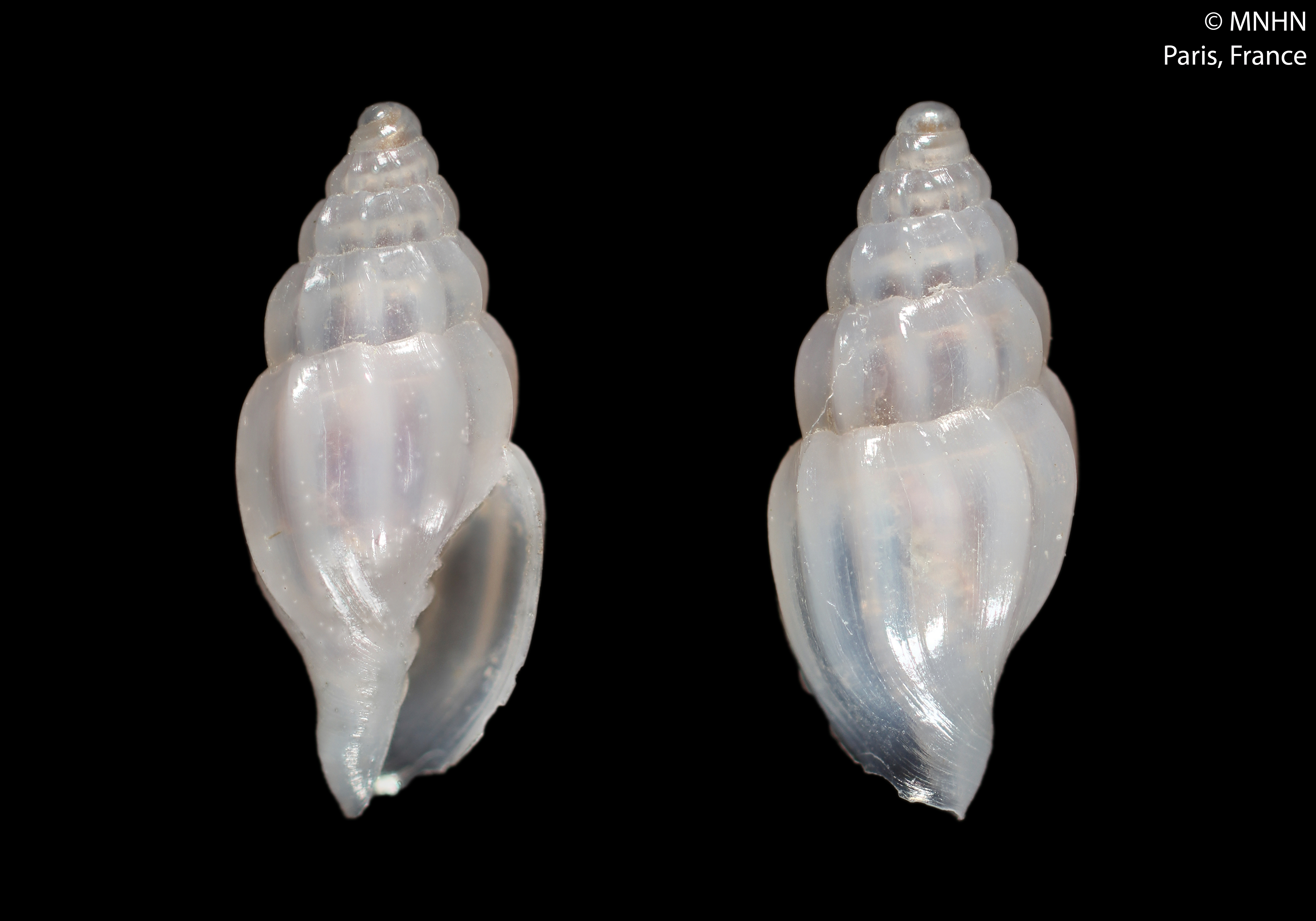

Scientific classification
- Kingdom: Animalia
- Phylum: Mollusca
- Class: Gastropoda
- Subclass: Caenogastropoda
- Order: Neogastropoda
- Family: Volutomitridae
- Genus: Microvoluta
- Species: M. amphissa

Binomial name
- Microvoluta amphissa Bouchet & Kantor, 2004

= Microvoluta amphissa =

Species of gastropod

Microvoluta amphissa is a species of sea snail, a marine gastropod mollusk in the family Volutomitridae.

== Description ==
The length of the shell attains 6.156 mm.

== Distribution ==
From the tropical Pacific surrounding New Caledonia.
