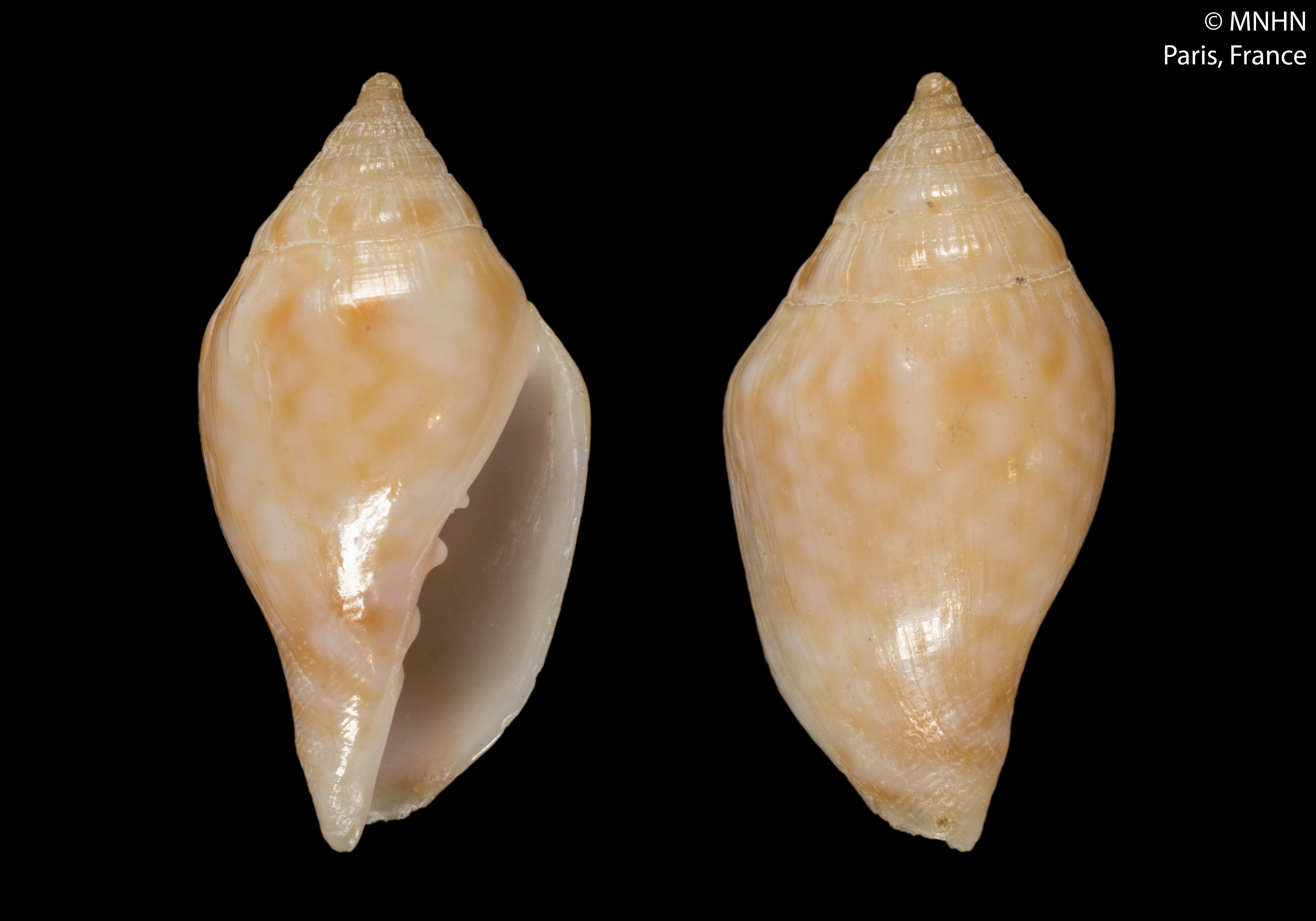
- Shell of Volutomitra glabella (specimen at MNHN, Paris)

Scientific classification
- Kingdom: Animalia
- Phylum: Mollusca
- Class: Gastropoda
- Subclass: Caenogastropoda
- Order: Neogastropoda
- Superfamily: Turbinelloidea
- Family: Volutomitridae
- Genus: Volutomitra
- Species: V. glabella

Binomial name
- Volutomitra glabella Bouchet & Kantor, 2000

= Volutomitra glabella =

Species of gastropod

Volutomitra glabella is a species of sea snail, a marine gastropod mollusk in the family Volutomitridae.

== Description ==
The length of the shell attains 24 mm.

== Distribution ==
This marine species occurs off the Norfolk Ridge, New Caledonia.
