= Volvarina porcellana =

Scientific classification
- Kingdom: Animalia
- Phylum: Mollusca
- Class: Gastropoda
- Subclass: Caenogastropoda
- Order: Neogastropoda
- Family: Marginellidae
- Genus: Volvarina
- Species: V. porcellana

Binomial name
- Volvarina porcellana (Melvill & Standen, 1912)

Synonyms
- Mitra (Volutomitra) porcellana Melvill & Standen, 1912; Mitra porcellana Melvill & Standen, 1912; Volutomitra porcellana (Melvill & Standen, 1912)

Species of gastropod

Volvarina porcellana is a species of sea snail, a marine gastropod mollusk in the family Marginellidae.

== Description ==
The length of the shell attains 15 mm.

== Distribution ==
This species is found off Argentina and the South Orkneys.
