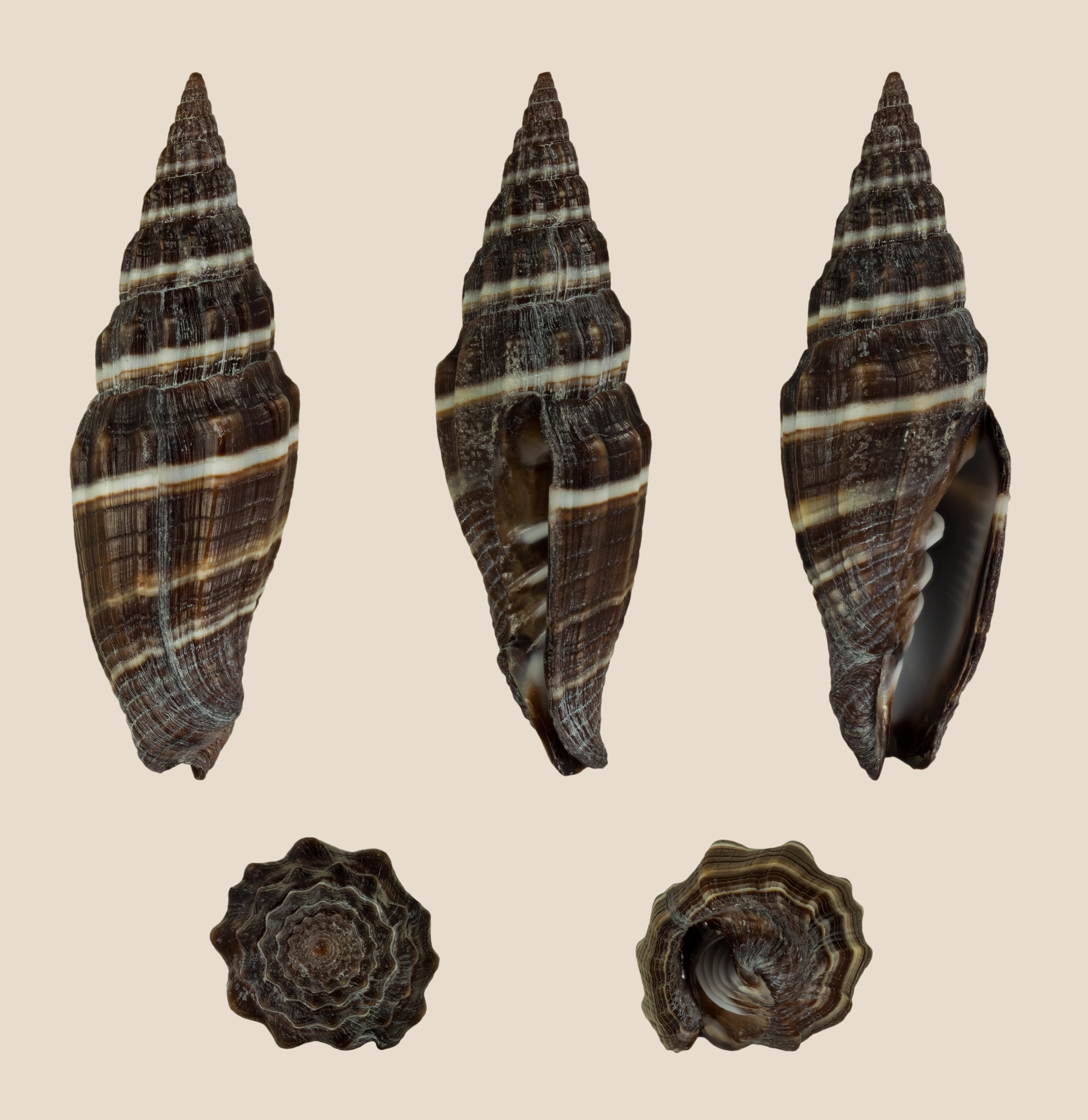

Scientific classification
- Kingdom: Animalia
- Phylum: Mollusca
- Class: Gastropoda
- Subclass: Caenogastropoda
- Order: Neogastropoda
- Family: Costellariidae
- Genus: Vexillum
- Species: V. intermedium

Binomial name
- Vexillum intermedium (Kiener, 1838)

Synonyms
- Mitra (Harpaeformis) lupulina Lesson, R.P. - uncertain; Mitra brionae G. B. Sowerby III, 1889; Mitra hybrida Kiener, L.C., 1838; Mitra intermedia Kiener, 1838; Vexillum (Vexillum) intermedium (Kiener, 1838) ·; Vexillum rugosum intermediatum [sic] (misspelling)

= Vexillum intermedium =

Species of gastropod

Vexillum (Vexillum) intermedium, commonly named the intermediate mitre, is a species of small sea snail, marine gastropod mollusk in the family Costellariidae, the ribbed miters.

== Description ==
The length of the shell varies between 40 mm and 65 mm.

The shell is alternately zoned with ashy or chocolate-brown and white.

== Distribution ==
This species occurs in the Red Sea, in the Indian Ocean off Madagascar and the Seychelles and in the Pacific Ocean off the Philippines, Indonesia, New Caledonia, Papua New Guinea and Western Australia and Queensland, Australia.
