= Microvoluta intermedia =

Scientific classification
- Kingdom: Animalia
- Phylum: Mollusca
- Class: Gastropoda
- Subclass: Caenogastropoda
- Order: Neogastropoda
- Family: Volutomitridae
- Genus: Microvoluta
- Species: M. intermedia

Binomial name
- Microvoluta intermedia (Dall, 1890)

Synonyms
- Conomitra intermedia Dall, 1890

Species of gastropod

Microvoluta intermedia is a species of sea snail, a marine gastropod mollusk in the family Volutomitridae.
