= Glabella (disambiguation) =

Glabella is the space between the eyebrows and above the nose in human anatomy.

Glabella may also refer to:

- Glabella (gastropod), a sea snail genus in the family Marginellidae
- Glabella (trilobite anatomy), the expression of the axial lobe in the cephalon of a trilobite
