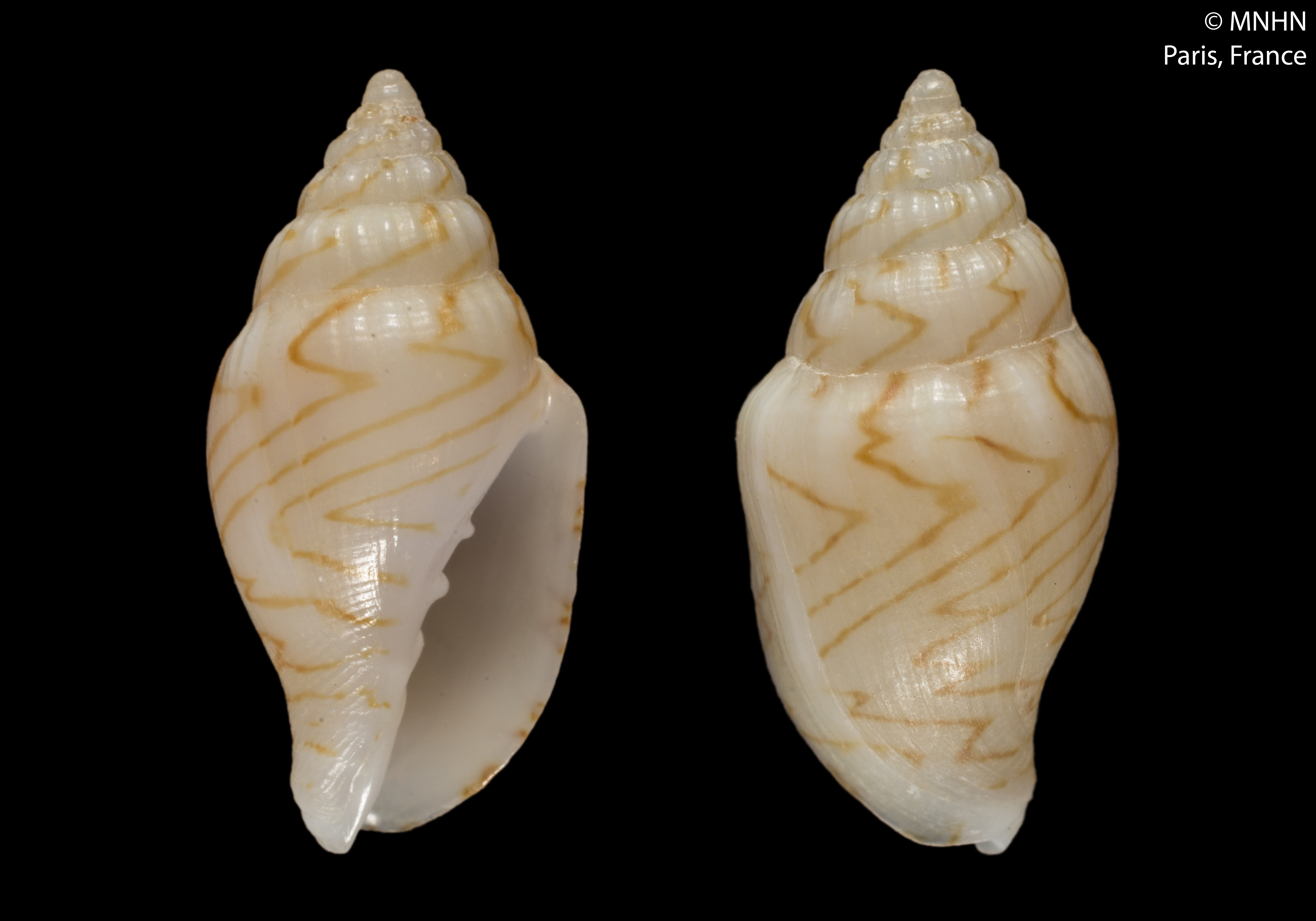
- Volutomitra ziczac

Scientific classification
- Kingdom: Animalia
- Phylum: Mollusca
- Class: Gastropoda
- Subclass: Caenogastropoda
- Order: Neogastropoda
- Superfamily: Turbinelloidea
- Family: Volutomitridae; Gray, 1854

Genera
- See text.

Synonyms
- Microvolutidae Iredale & McMichael, 1962; Peculatoridae Iredale & McMichael, 1962

= Volutomitridae =

Family of sea snails

Volutomitridae is a family of sea snails, marine gastropod mollusks, in the superfamily Turbinelloidea.

== Distribution ==
The highest diversity of Volutomitridae is found off the coast of New Caledonia.

== Genera ==
The family Volutomitridae contains six genera and about fifty described recent species:

- Conomitra Conrad, 1865
- Magdalemitra Kilburn, 1974
- Microvoluta Angas, 1877
- Paradmete Strebel, 1908
- Peculator Iredale, 1924
- Volutomitra H. Adams and A. Adams, 1853
