= List of non-marine molluscs of Costa Rica =

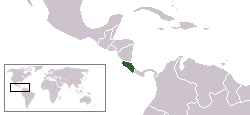
Location of Costa Rica

The non-marine molluscs of Costa Rica are a part of the wildlife of Costa Rica. 233 species and subspecies have been reported (50 freshwater and 183 terrestrial), however scientists estimate that a full inventory can reach up to 300 or 400 species.

The terrestrial gastropods reported for Costa Rica belong to 25 families and 59 genera, and include 11 doubtful identifications. Species are commonly found in paramo and oak forests Samples of the species collected in Costa Rica can be found in the Museum of Zoology of the Universidad de Costa Rica.

The terrestrial malacofauna of Costa Rica presents an endemism of 31% in terrestrial species and 8% in freshwater species. These species can be affected by water pollution, deforestation and the destruction of calcium-rich habitats.

== Gastropods ==
The land gastropods belong to the class Gastropoda. In Costa Rica the taxonomy of this group is as follows:

Helicinidae (17 subspecies)

- Helicina boeckeleri Richling, 2001
- Helicina deppeana parvidens Pilsbry, 1920
- Helicina funcki funcki Pfr, 1848
- Helicina funcki costaricensis Wagner, 1905
- Helicina hojarasca Richling, 2001
- Helicina oweniana coccinostoma Morelet, 1849
- Helicina oweniana anozona Martens, 1875
- Helicina pitalensis Wagner, 1911
- Helicina tenuis tenuis Pfr., 1848
- Helicina tenuis pittieri Wagner, 1911
- Lucidella lirata Pfr., 1847
- Olygyra beatrix Beatrix Angas, 1879
- Olygyra beatrix confusa Wagner, 1911
- Olygyra chiquitica Richling, 2001
- Olygyra fragilis Morelet, 1851
- Olygyra gemma Preston,1903
- Olygyra talamancensis Richling, 2001

Cyclophoridae (15 subspecies)

- Barbacyclus boucardi Angas, 1878
- Barbacyclus princeps Pilsbry, 1935
- Barbacyclus underwoodi Da Costa, 1900
- *Dicrista cooperi Tryon, 1863
- Neocyclotus bisinuatus Martens, 1864
- Neocyclotus capscelius Thompson, 1969
- Neocyclotus carmioli Bartsch & Morrison, 1942
- Neocyclotus costarricense Martens, 1876
- Neocyclotus dysoni dysoni Pfr., 1851
- Neocyclotus dysoni valerioi Bartsch & Morrison, 1942
- Neocyclotus dysoni nicaraguense Bartsch & Morrison, 1942
- Neocyclotus exiguum Bartsch & Morrison, 1942
- Neocyclotus irregulare Pfr., 1855
- Neocyclotus impressus Thompson, 1969
- Neocyclotus pittieri Martens, 1900

Diplommatinidae (1 species)

- Adelopoma costaricense Bartsch & Morrison, 1942

Carychiidae (1 species)

- Carychium exiguum costaricanum

Achatinellidae (2 species)

- Tornatellina biolleyi Martens, 1902
- Tornatellina pittieri Martens, 1898

Vertiginidae (3 species)

- Gastrocopta gularis Thompson & López, 1996
- Nesopupa cocosensis Dall, 1900
- Pupisoma dioscoricola C.B. Adams, 1845

Orthalicidae (30 species)

- Bulimulus corneus Sowerby, 1833
- Drymaeus alternans Beck, 1837
- Drymaeus attenuatus attenuates Pfr., 1851
- Drymaeus attenuatus pittieri Martens, 1893
- Drymaeus costaricensis Pfr., 1862
- Drymaeus discrepans Sowerby, 1833
- Drymaeus gabbi Angas, 1879
- Drymaeus hoffmanni Martens, 1893
- Drymaeus inusitatus Fulton, 1900
- Drymaeus irazuensis Angas, 1878
- Drymaeus jonasi Pfr., 1846
- Drymaeus josephus josephus Angas, 1878
- Drymaeus josephus maculosus Martens, 1893
- Drymaeus josephus concolor Martens, 1893
- Drymaeus lineolatus Conrad, 1855
- Drymaeus megastomus Parodiz, 1962
- Drymaeus pluvialis Pfr., 1862
- Drymaeus recluzianus recluzianus Pfr., 1847
- Drymaeus recluzianus martesianus Pilsbry, 1899
- Drymaeus semimaculatus Pilsbry, 1898
- Drymaeus semipellucidus Tristram, 1861
- Drymaeus sulphureus sulphureus Pfr., 1856
- Drymaeus sulphureus citronellus Angas, 1879
- Drymaeus sulphureus obesus Martens, 1893
- Drymaeus tripictus Albers, 1857
- Drymaeus zhorquinensis Angas, 1879
- Orthalicus ferussaci Martens, 1863
- Orthalicus princeps Sowerby, 1833
- Orthalicus tricinctus Martens, 1893
- Orthalicus zoniferus crossei Martens, 1893

Urocoptidae (1 species)

- Microceramus concisus Morelet, 1849

Subulinidae (23 species)

- Beckianum beckianum beckianum Pfr., 1846
- Beckianum beckianum gabbianum Angas, 1879
- Beckianum sinistrum Martens, 1898
- Lamellaxis gracilis Hutton, 1834
- Lamellaxis micra micra Orbigny, 1835
- Lamellaxis micra subovale Martens, 1898
- Leptinaria ambigua Martens, 1898
- Leptinaria biolleyi Martens, 1898
- Leptinaria convoluta Martens, 1898
- Leptinaria costaricana Martens, 1898
- Leptinaria crenulata Martens, 1898
- Leptinaria guatemalensis majuscula Martens, 1898
- Leptinaria hapaloides Martens, 1898
- Leptinaria insignis E.A. Smith, 1898
- Leptinaria interstriata Tate, 1869–70
- Leptinaria pittieri pittieri Martens, 1898
- Leptinaria pittieri obliquata Martens, 1898
- Leptinaria solida Martens, 1898
- Opeas bocourtianum bocourtianum Crosse & Fischer, 1869
- Opeas bocourtianum pittieri Martens, 1898
- Opeas guatemalense Strebel, 1882
- Opeas pumilum Pfr., 1840
- Subulina octona Bruguière, 1792

Spiraxidae (33 species)

- Euglandina aurata Morelet, 1849
- Euglandina aurantiaca Angas, 1879
- Euglandina anomala Angas, 1879
- Euglandina broctontomlini Pilsbry, 1926
- Euglandina cumingi cumingi Beck, 1837
- Euglandina cumingi rubromarginata Martens, 1891
- Euglandina cylindracea Phillips, 1846
- Euglandina gigantea Pilsbry, 1926
- Euglandina isabelline Pfr., 1846
- Euglandina mitriformis Angas, 1879
- Euglandina monilifera pulcherrima Pfr., 1845
- Euglandina pittieri Martens, 1901
- Pittieria bicolor Martens, 1901
- Pittieria underwoodi Fulton, 1897
- Spiraxis nitidus pittieri Martens, 1898
- Spiraxis paulisculpta Rehder, 1942
- Spiraxis scalella Martens, 1898
- Streptostyla binneyana Crosse & Fischer, 1869
- Streptostyla costaricensis Da Costa, 1904
- Streptostyla cylindracea Pfr., 1846
- *Streptostyla delibuta delibuta Morelet, 1851
- *Streptostyla delibuta crassa Martens 1892-1901: 615
- Streptostyla flavescens boucardi Pfr., 1861
- Streptostyla gabbi Pilsbry, 1907
- *Streptostyla labida (Morelet, 1851)
- *Streptostyla lurida (Shuttleworth, 1852)
- *Streptostyla meridana cobanensis (Tristam, 1861)
- *Streptostyla mitraeformis (Shuttleworth, 1852)
- *Streptostyla sololensis Crosse & Fischer, 1869
- *Streptostyla turgidula (Pfr., 1856)
- Streptostyla valerioi Rehder, 1942
- Streptostyla viridula Angas, 1879
- Salasiella pulchella (Pfr., 1856)

Systrophiidae (5 species)

- Drepanostomella stolli (Martens, 1892)
- Guesteria powisiana (Pfr.)
- Miradiscops puncticipitis (Pilsbry, 1926)
- Occultator olssoni Pilsbry, 1926
- Systrophia costaricana Rehder, 1942

Helicodiscidae (2 species)

- Chanomphalus pilsbryi (Baker, 1922)
- Radiodiscus millecostatus costaricanus Pilsbry, 1926

Charopidae (1 species)

- Rotadiscus pilsbryi Rehder, 1942

Succineidae (5 species)

- Succinea costaricana Martens, 1898
- Succinea globispira Martens, 1898
- Succinea guatemalensis Morelet, 1849
- Succinea haustellum Rehder, 1942
- Succinea recisa Morelet, 1851

Helicarionidae (15 species)

- Euconulus pittieri Martens, 1892)
- Guppya angasi Martens, 1892
- Guppya biolleyi Martens, 1892
- Guppya calverti Pilsbry, 1920
- Guppya micans (Angas, 1879)
- Guppya orosciana Martens, 1892
- Habroconus costaricanus costaricanus (Pilsbry, 1920)
- Habroconus costaricanus elatior (Pilsbry, 1920)
- Habroconus championi (Martens, 1892)
- Habroconus hopkinsi (Dall, 1900)
- Habroconus pallidus Baker, 1941
- Habroconus pacificus (Pfr., 1846)
- Habroconus trochulinus (Morelet, 1851)
- Ovachlamys fulgens (Gude, 1900)
- Velifera gabbi Binney, 1879

Zonitidae (6 species)

- Glyphyalinia indentata (Say, 1823)
- Hawaiia minuscula (Binney, 1840)
- Mesomphix modestus (Martens, 1892)
- Zonitoides arboreus (Say, 1816)
- Zonitoides hoffmanni (Martens, 1892)
- Zonitoides multivolvis Pilsbry, 1926

Limacidae (1 species)

- Deroceras laeve (Müller, 1774)

Polygyridae (1 species)

- Praticolella griseola (Pfr., 1891)

Thysanophoridae (2 species)

- *Microconus wilhelmi (Pfr., 1866)
- Thysanophora costaricensis Rehder, 1942

Camaenidae (4 species)

- Labyrinthus quadridentatus quadridentatus (Broderip, 1832)
- Labyrinthus quadridentatus biolleyi Solem, 1966
- Labyrinthus triplicatus (Martens, 1868)
- Solaropsis tiloriensis (Angas, 1879)

Helicidae (1 species)

- Cornu aspersum = Helix aspersa Müller, 1774

Helminthoglyptidae (8 species)

- Averellia macneili (Crosse, 1873)
- Cryptostrakon corcovadensis Cuezzo, 1997
- Cryptostrakon gabbi (Binney, 1879)
- Leptarionta adela (Angas, 1878)
- Leptarionta costaricensis (Roth in Pfr., 1857)
- Leptarionta zhorquinensis (Angas, 1879)
- Trichodiscina suturalis (Pfr., 1846)
- Trichodiscina pressula (Morelet, 1851)

Arionidae (1 species)

- Ariolimax costaricensis Cockerell, 1890

Philomycidae (1 species)

- Pallifera costaricensis (Mörch, 1857)

Veronicellidae (2 species)

- Diplosolenodes occidentalis (Guilding, 1825)
- Sarasinula plebeia (Fischer, 1868)

Incertae sedis

- Hyalinia glomerula Martens, 1892
- Hyalinia permodesta minor Martens, 1892

== Bivalvia ==
Some bivalves can be found in freshwater ecosystems.

== See also ==
- List of amphibians of Costa Rica
- List of birds of Costa Rica
- List of mammals of Costa Rica
- List of non-marine molluscs of Nicaragua
- List of reptiles of Costa Rica
