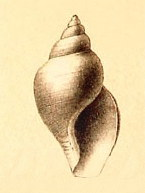
- Typhlodaphne corpulenta

Scientific classification
- Kingdom: Animalia
- Phylum: Mollusca
- Class: Gastropoda
- Subclass: Caenogastropoda
- Order: Neogastropoda
- Superfamily: Conoidea
- Family: Borsoniidae
- Genus: Typhlodaphne; Powell, 1951

Type species
- Bela purissima Strebel, 1908

= Typhlodaphne =

Genus of gastropods

Typhlodaphne is a genus of sea snails, marine gastropod mollusks in the family Borsoniidae.

== Description ==
The smooth protoconch is bluntly rounded and paucispiral, consisting of two whorls. The sinus is subsutural, steeply descending and then produced forward to meet the arcuately produced outer lip. The vestigial operculum may reflect an archaic condition.

== Species ==
Species within the genus Typhlodaphne include:

- Typhlodaphne bonardi Poppe & Tagaro, 2026
- Typhlodaphne corpulenta (Watson, 1881)
- Typhlodaphne filostriata (Strebel, 1905)
- Typhlodaphne paratenoceras (Powell, 1951)
- Typhlodaphne payeni (Rochebrune & Mabille, 1885)
- Typhlodaphne platamodes (Watson, 1881)
- Typhlodaphne purissima (Strebel, 1908)
- Typhlodaphne strebeli Powell, 1951

Species brought into synonymy

- Typhlodaphne innocentia Dell, 1990: synonym of Pleurotomella innocentia (Dell, 1990) (original combination)
- Typhlodaphne nipri Numanami, 1996: synonym of Pleurotomella nipri (Numanami, 1996) (original combination)
- Typhlodaphne translucida (Watson, 1881): synonym of Xanthodaphne translucida (Watson, 1881)
