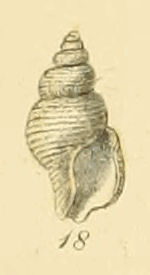
- Thesbia nana shell

Scientific classification
- Kingdom: Animalia
- Phylum: Mollusca
- Class: Gastropoda
- Subclass: Caenogastropoda
- Order: Neogastropoda
- Superfamily: Conoidea
- Family: Raphitomidae
- Genus: Thesbia; Jeffreys, 1867

Type species
- Tritonium nanum Lovén, 1846

Species
- See text

Synonyms
- Daphnella (Thesbia); Pleurotoma (Thesbia) Jeffreys, 1867

= Thesbia =

Genus of gastropods

Thesbia is a genus of sea snails, marine gastropod mollusks belonging to the family Raphitomidae.

This genus was named after Thesbia, one of the Sea-nymphs of Hesiod.

== Description ==
the original description of this genus notes that it features thin and smooth outer lip while the apex of the spire is irregularly coiled.

== Species ==
Species within the genus Thesbia include:

- Thesbia dyscrita (Watson, 1881)
- Thesbia michaelseni (Strebel, 1905)
- Thesbia nana (Lovén, 1846)
- Thesbia unica Sysoev, 1988

Species brought into synonymy

- Thesbia albus Mac Andrew & Forbes, 1847: synonym of Thesbia nana (Lovén, 1846)
- Thesbia algoensis Thiele, 1925: synonym of Glyptanachis algoensis (Thiele, 1925): synonym of Decipifus algoensis (Thiele, 1925)
- † Thesbia antiselli (Anderson & Martin, 1914): synonym of † Xenuroturris antiselli (F. Anderson & B. Martin, 1914)
- Thesbia filostriata Strebel, 1905: synonym of Typhlodaphne filostriata (Strebel, 1905)
- Thesbia folini Locard, 1897: synonym of Xanthodaphne leptalea (Bush, 1893)
- Thesbia innocens E. A. Smith, 1907: synonym of Falsimohnia innocens (E. A. Smith, 1907)
- Thesbia nanum Lovén, 1846: synonym of Thesbia nana (Lovén, 1846)
- Thesbia nudator Locard, 1897: synonym of Bathybela nudator (Locard, 1897)
- Thesbia ohlini Strebel, 1905: synonym of Pleurotomella ohlini (Strebel, 1905)
