= Calliostoma anderssoni =

Scientific classification
- Kingdom: Animalia
- Phylum: Mollusca
- Class: Gastropoda
- Subclass: Vetigastropoda
- Order: Trochida
- Family: Calliostomatidae
- Subfamily: Calliostomatinae
- Genus: Calliostoma
- Species: C. anderssoni

Binomial name
- Calliostoma anderssoni Strebel, 1908

Species of gastropod

Calliostoma anderssoni is a species of sea snail, a marine gastropod mollusk in the family Calliostomatidae.

== Description ==
The size of the shell varies between 5 mm and 25 mm.

== Distribution ==
This species occurs in the Atlantic Ocean off Argentina.
