= Typhlodaphne strebeli =

Scientific classification
- Kingdom: Animalia
- Phylum: Mollusca
- Class: Gastropoda
- Subclass: Caenogastropoda
- Order: Neogastropoda
- Superfamily: Conoidea
- Family: Borsoniidae
- Genus: Typhlodaphne
- Species: T. strebeli

Binomial name
- Typhlodaphne strebeli Powell, 1951

Species of gastropod

Typhlodaphne strebeli is a species of sea snail, a marine gastropod mollusk in the family Borsoniidae.

== Description ==
The size of an adult shell varies between 15 mm and 30 mm. The elongate, ovate-fusiform shell has a buff color. It differs from Typhlodaphne purissima (Strebel, 1908) by being slender, having a smaller protoconch (1½ whorls) and showing flexuous, closely spaced, subobsolete axials (numbering 18 to 24) over the 5 whorls of the teleoconch. The shoulder is slightly concave. The narrowly ovate aperture has a rounded anterior end. Across the shell run numerous microscopic lirae.

== Distribution ==
This marine species occurs along the Tierra del Fuego.
