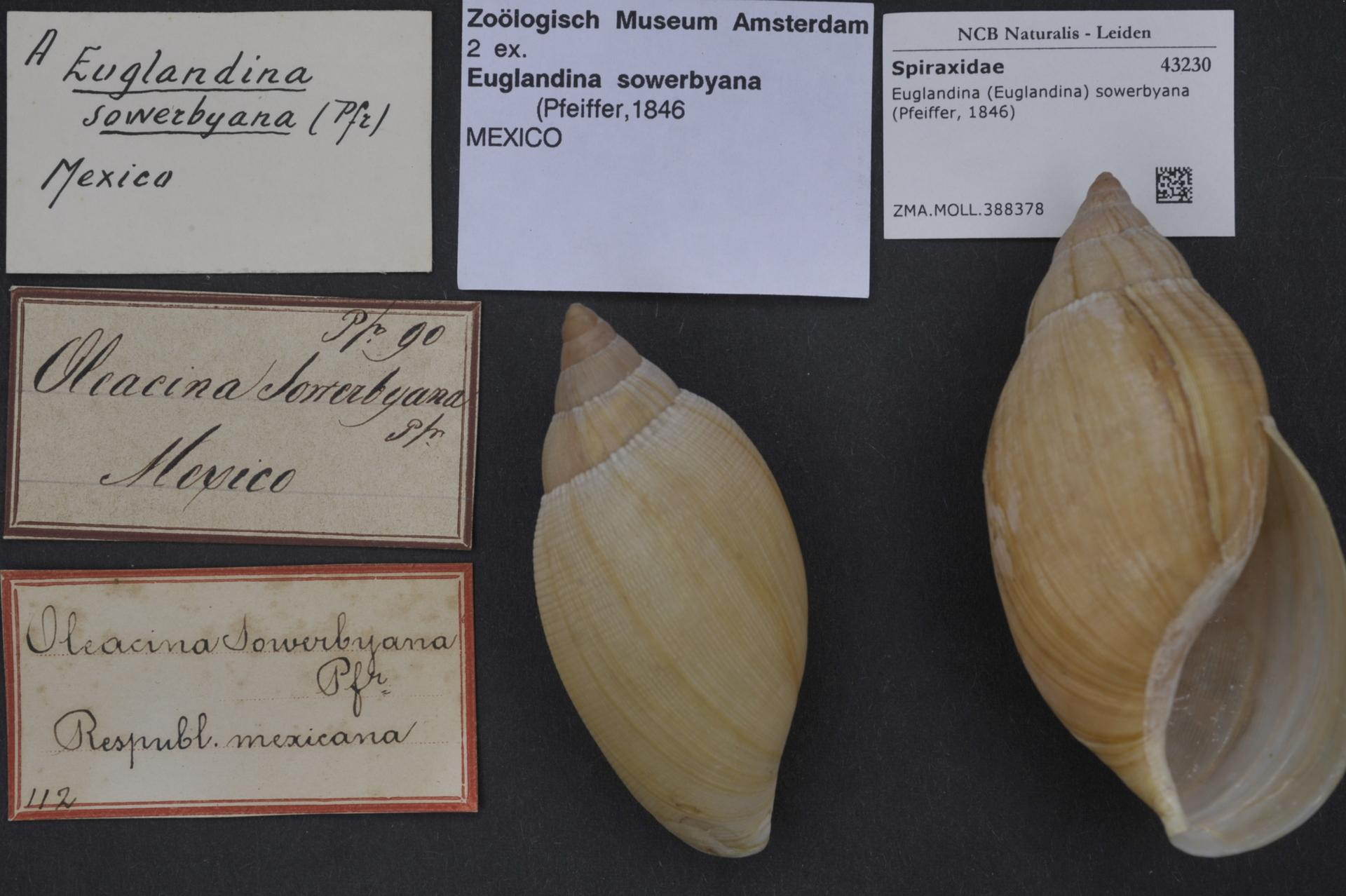

Scientific classification
- Kingdom: Animalia
- Phylum: Mollusca
- Class: Gastropoda
- Order: Stylommatophora
- Family: Spiraxidae
- Genus: Euglandina
- Species: E. sowerbyana

Binomial name
- Euglandina sowerbyana (Pfeiffer, 1846)

= Euglandina sowerbyana =

Species of gastropod

Euglandina sowerbyana is a species of predatory air-breathing land snail, a terrestrial pulmonate gastropod mollusk in the family Spiraxidae.

== Subspecies ==
- Euglandina sowerbyana sowerbyana (Pfeiffer, 1846)
- Euglandina sowerbyana estephaniae (Strebel, 1875)
