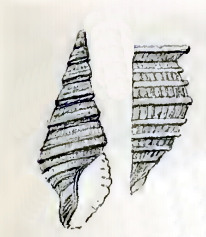
- Original image of a shell of Mangelia cingulata

Scientific classification
- Kingdom: Animalia
- Phylum: Mollusca
- Class: Gastropoda
- Subclass: Caenogastropoda
- Order: Neogastropoda
- Superfamily: Conoidea
- Family: Mangeliidae
- Genus: Mangelia
- Species: M. cingulata

Binomial name
- Mangelia cingulata (Strebel, 1908)

Synonyms
- Mangilia cingulata H. Strebel, 1908

= Mangelia cingulata =

Species of gastropod

Mangelia cingulata is a species of sea snail, a marine gastropod mollusk in the family Mangeliidae.

== Description ==
The length of the shell attains 7.7 mm, its diameter 2.6 mm.

The solid, brownish shell is turriform. The apex is broken off, but 10-11 whorls appear to have existed. These are steeply angulated with a suture impressed below the lowest strongest spiral. Three such spirals are present on the whorls in increasing strength. Another four of decreasing strength show a slightly larger interstice on the body whorl. Between the spiral ribs are fine, extensively extended ribs in the direction of growth, but they become mostly indistinct by a fibrous cuticle.

== Distribution ==
This marine species occurs off Uruguay and South Georgia.
