= Calliostoma modestulum =

Scientific classification
- Kingdom: Animalia
- Phylum: Mollusca
- Class: Gastropoda
- Subclass: Vetigastropoda
- Order: Trochida
- Family: Calliostomatidae
- Subfamily: Calliostomatinae
- Genus: Calliostoma
- Species: C. modestulum

Binomial name
- Calliostoma modestulum Strebel, 1908

Species of gastropod

Calliostoma modestulum is a species of sea snail, a marine gastropod mollusk in the family Calliostomatidae.

== Description ==
The height of the shell attains 13 mm.

== Distribution ==
This species occurs in the Atlantic Ocean off Argentina, the Falkland Islands and Tierra del Fuego at depths between 66 m and 251 m.
