= Euglandina texasiana =

Conservation status
- Critically Imperiled (NatureServe)

Scientific classification
- Kingdom: Animalia
- Phylum: Mollusca
- Class: Gastropoda
- Order: Stylommatophora
- Family: Spiraxidae
- Genus: Euglandina
- Species: E. texasiana

Binomial name
- Euglandina texasiana (Pfeiffer, 1856)

Species of gastropod

Euglandina texasiana is a species of large predatory air-breathing land snail, a terrestrial pulmonate gastropod mollusk in the family Spiraxidae. It is commonly known as the glossy wolfsnail.

== Description ==
The body of this species is 10 cm long and the shell is 5–7 cm. The shell color is off-white or faded pink. The shell is slightly larger and more elongated than that of Euglandina rosea, though otherwise, it is quite similar.

Euglandina texasiana overall has less pigmentation than the other species in the genus, and because of this it is sometimes known as the "Texas pale glandina".

== Habitat and range ==
E. texasiana is native to southern Texas in the United States as well as northeastern Mexico. It is restricted to the Lower Rio Grande Valley in Texas but can be found in the coastal lowlands of Mexico from Tamaulipas south to northern Veracruz, including eastern San Luis Potosí and Nuevo León.
