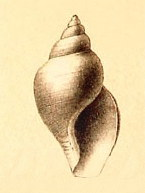
- Original drawing of a shell of Typhlodaphne corpulenta

Scientific classification
- Kingdom: Animalia
- Phylum: Mollusca
- Class: Gastropoda
- Subclass: Caenogastropoda
- Order: Neogastropoda
- Superfamily: Conoidea
- Family: Borsoniidae
- Genus: Typhlodaphne
- Species: T. corpulenta

Binomial name
- Typhlodaphne corpulenta (R. Boog Watson, 1881)

Synonyms
- Drillia Thesbia corpulenta Watson, 1881; Pleurotoma corpulenta Watson, 1881

= Typhlodaphne corpulenta =

Species of gastropod

Typhlodaphne corpulenta is a species of sea snail, a marine gastropod mollusk in the family Borsoniidae.

== Description ==
Typhlodaphne corpulenta differs from Typhlodaphne innocentia, Dell, 1990, by having a thicker shell.

== Distribution ==
This species occurs in the Southern Indian Ocean off the Kerguelen Islands.
