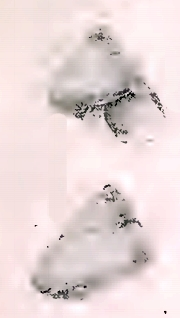
- Original drawing with two views of a shell of Calliostoma moebiusi

Scientific classification
- Kingdom: Animalia
- Phylum: Mollusca
- Class: Gastropoda
- Subclass: Vetigastropoda
- Order: Trochida
- Family: Calliostomatidae
- Subfamily: Calliostomatinae
- Genus: Calliostoma
- Species: C. moebiusi

Binomial name
- Calliostoma moebiusi Strebel, 1905

= Calliostoma moebiusi =

Species of gastropod

Calliostoma moebiusi is a species of sea snail, a marine gastropod mollusk in the family Calliostomatidae.

== Description ==
The size of the shell varies between 9 mm and 17 mm.

== Distribution ==
This marine species occurs off Argentina, Tierra del Fuego, Straits of Magellan and Chile at a depth of about 35 m.
