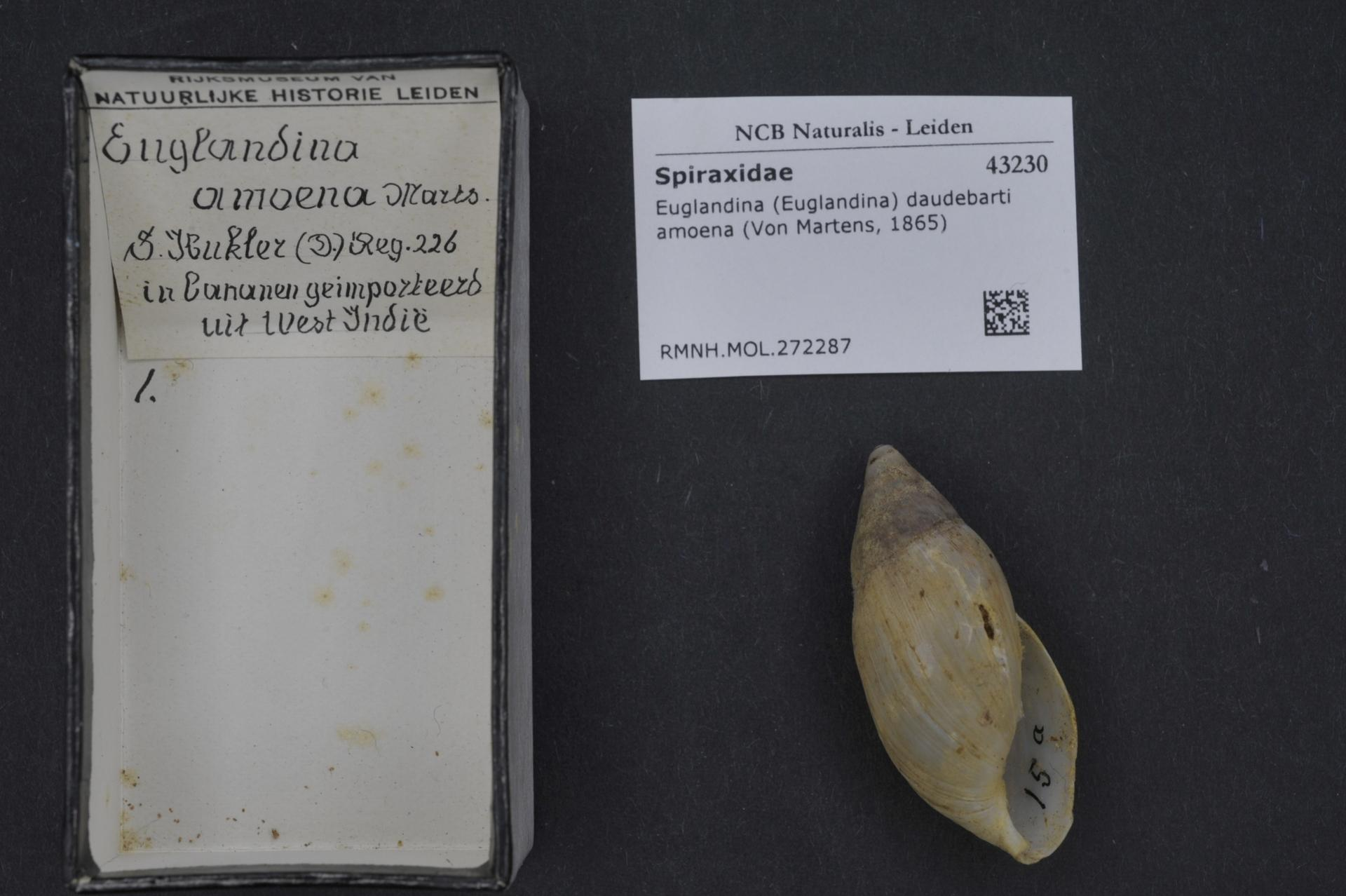
- Euglandina daudebarti shell

Scientific classification
- Kingdom: Animalia
- Phylum: Mollusca
- Class: Gastropoda
- Order: Stylommatophora
- Family: Spiraxidae
- Genus: Euglandina
- Species: E. daudebarti

Binomial name
- Euglandina daudebarti (Deshayes, 1850)

= Euglandina daudebarti =

Species of gastropod

Euglandina daudebarti is a species of large predatory air-breathing land snail, a terrestrial pulmonate gastropod mollusk in the family Spiraxidae.

== Subspecies ==
- Euglandina daudebarti daudebarti (Deshayes, 1850)
- Euglandina daudebarti amoena (Von Martens, 1865)
- Euglandina daudebarti jalapana (Von Martens, 1891)
- Euglandina daudebarti miradorensis (Strebel, 1878)
