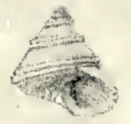
- Original drawing of a shell of Calliostoma irisans

Scientific classification
- Kingdom: Animalia
- Phylum: Mollusca
- Class: Gastropoda
- Subclass: Vetigastropoda
- Order: Trochida
- Family: Calliostomatidae
- Subfamily: Calliostomatinae
- Genus: Calliostoma
- Species: C. irisans

Binomial name
- Calliostoma irisans Strebel, 1905

= Calliostoma irisans =

Species of gastropod

Calliostoma irisans is a species of sea snail, a marine gastropod mollusk in the family Calliostomatidae.

== Description ==
The height of the shell attains 11 mm. The whitish shell is strongly iridescent, with mainly a purple hue. The 5¾ whorls are barely concave, with the exception of the body whorl. Only the first and the second whorl are granulated.

== Distribution ==
This marine species occurs off Argentina, the Falkland Islands and the Strait of Magellan
