= Thesbia michaelseni =

Scientific classification
- Kingdom: Animalia
- Phylum: Mollusca
- Class: Gastropoda
- Subclass: Caenogastropoda
- Order: Neogastropoda
- Superfamily: Conoidea
- Family: Raphitomidae
- Genus: Thesbia
- Species: T. michaelseni

Binomial name
- Thesbia michaelseni (Strebel, 1905)

Synonyms
- Daphnella (Thesbia) michaelseni Strebel, 1905 (basionym); Daphnella michaelseni Strebel, 1905 (original combination)

Species of gastropod

Thesbia michaelseni is a species of sea snail, a marine gastropod mollusk in the family Raphitomidae.
