= Euglandina lamyi =

Scientific classification
- Kingdom: Animalia
- Phylum: Mollusca
- Class: Gastropoda
- Order: Stylommatophora
- Family: Spiraxidae
- Genus: Euglandina
- Species: E. lamyi

Binomial name
- Euglandina lamyi (Fischer & Chatelet, 1903)

Species of gastropod

Euglandina lamyi is a species of predatory air-breathing land snail, a terrestrial pulmonate gastropod mollusk in the family Spiraxidae.
