= Euglandina dactylus =

Scientific classification
- Kingdom: Animalia
- Phylum: Mollusca
- Class: Gastropoda
- Order: Stylommatophora
- Family: Spiraxidae
- Genus: Euglandina
- Species: E. dactylus

Binomial name
- Euglandina dactylus (Broderip, 1832)

Species of gastropod

Euglandina dactylus is a species of large predatory air-breathing land snail, a terrestrial pulmonate gastropod mollusk in the family Spiraxidae.
