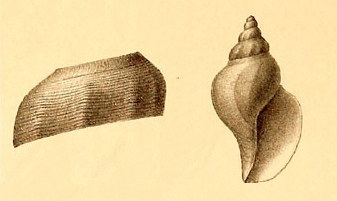
- Original drawing of a shell of Typhlodaphne platamodes

Scientific classification
- Kingdom: Animalia
- Phylum: Mollusca
- Class: Gastropoda
- Subclass: Caenogastropoda
- Order: Neogastropoda
- Superfamily: Conoidea
- Family: Borsoniidae
- Genus: Typhlodaphne
- Species: T. platamodes

Binomial name
- Typhlodaphne platamodes (R. Boog Watson, 1881)

Synonyms
- Drillia Thesbia platamodes Watson, 1881; Pleurotoma platamodes Watson, 1881

= Typhlodaphne platamodes =

Species of gastropod

Typhlodaphne platamodes is a species of sea snail, a marine gastropod mollusk in the family Borsoniidae.

== Distribution ==
This species occurs in the Southern Indian Ocean off the Kerguelen Islands and Crozet Island.
