= Thesbia dyscrita =

Scientific classification
- Kingdom: Animalia
- Phylum: Mollusca
- Class: Gastropoda
- Subclass: Caenogastropoda
- Order: Neogastropoda
- Superfamily: Conoidea
- Family: Raphitomidae
- Genus: Thesbia
- Species: T. dyscrita

Binomial name
- Thesbia dyscrita (R. B. Watson, 1881)

Synonyms
- Pleurotoma (Thesbia) dyscrita R.B. Watson, 1881

Species of gastropod

Thesbia dyscrita is a species of sea snail, a marine gastropod mollusk in the family Raphitomidae.

== Description ==
The maximum length is 9 mm.

(Original description) The thin, white shell is narrowly oblong or fusiform, with a longish, scarcely tumid body whorl, a shortish, conical, convexly whorled, small-pointed, shallow-sutured, conical spire, and a long conical base.

Sculpture. Longitudinals : there are delicate threadlike curved lines of growth, which are strongest near the top of the whorls. Spirals: the whole surface is equably covered with fine, faintly raised, rounded threads. They are slightly fretted by the longitudinals. Between them are little rounded furrows of about twice their breadth.

Colour: the spiral threads are porcellaneous, the furrows translucent white, and the surface is a little glossy.

The spire is rather short, conical, but slightly concave, with hardly any interruption in its profile-lines by the very slightly impressed suture and convexity of the whorls. The protoconch consists of 2½ rounded subcylindrical whorls rising to a small rounded point, where the extreme tip hardly projects and is bent down on one side. It is smooth and glossy, but retains traces of a ruddy epidermis with minute spiral threads. The shell contains 6 whorls in all, of regular but rapid increase, rather high and broad, convex, but sloping, and not tumid. The last is very long and full, though not tumid. And there is little contraction on the long conical base. The suture is slightly impressed, rather oblique. The aperture is large, open, and oblong, pointed above, scarcely contracted below, but truncated at the end of the broad open siphonal canal. The outer lip is very equably curved in both its planes. It has a somewhat high and prominent shoulder above, between which and the body whorl lies the rather deep, wide, rounded sinus. The inner lip shows a thin glaze on the body and out on the long columella, which is cut off in front with a long, thin, twisted, oblique edge.

== Distribution ==
THis species was found in the Caribbean Sea off Sombrero Island, Anguila at a depth of 823 m.
