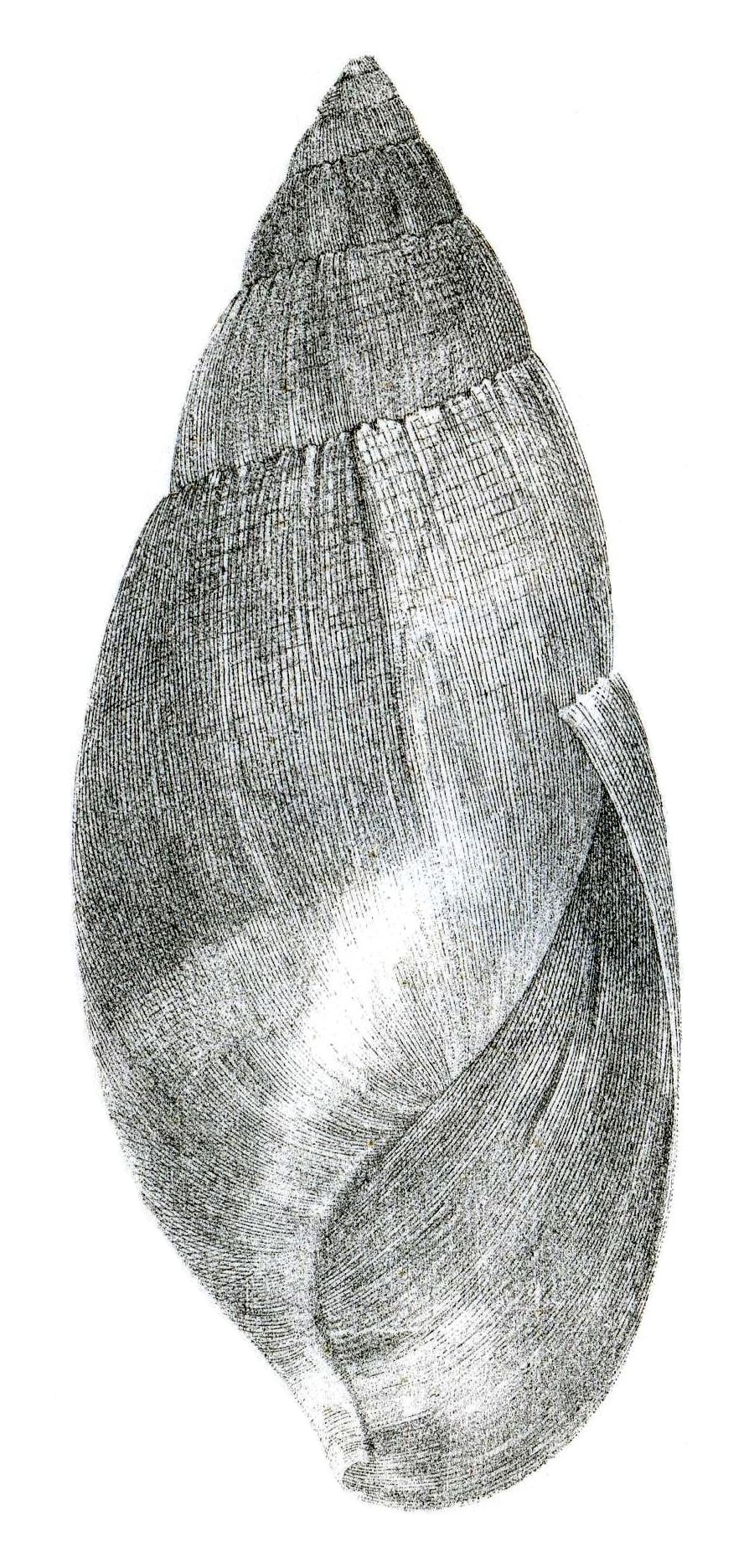
- Apertural view of a shell of Euglandina vanuxemensis from Binney, 1878

Scientific classification
- Kingdom: Animalia
- Phylum: Mollusca
- Class: Gastropoda
- Order: Stylommatophora
- Family: Spiraxidae
- Genus: Euglandina
- Species: E. vanuxemensis

Binomial name
- Euglandina vanuxemensis (Lea, 1834)

= Euglandina vanuxemensis =

Species of gastropod

Euglandina vanuxemensis, is a species of predatory air-breathing land snail, a carnivorous terrestrial pulmonate gastropod mollusk in the family Spiraxidae.
