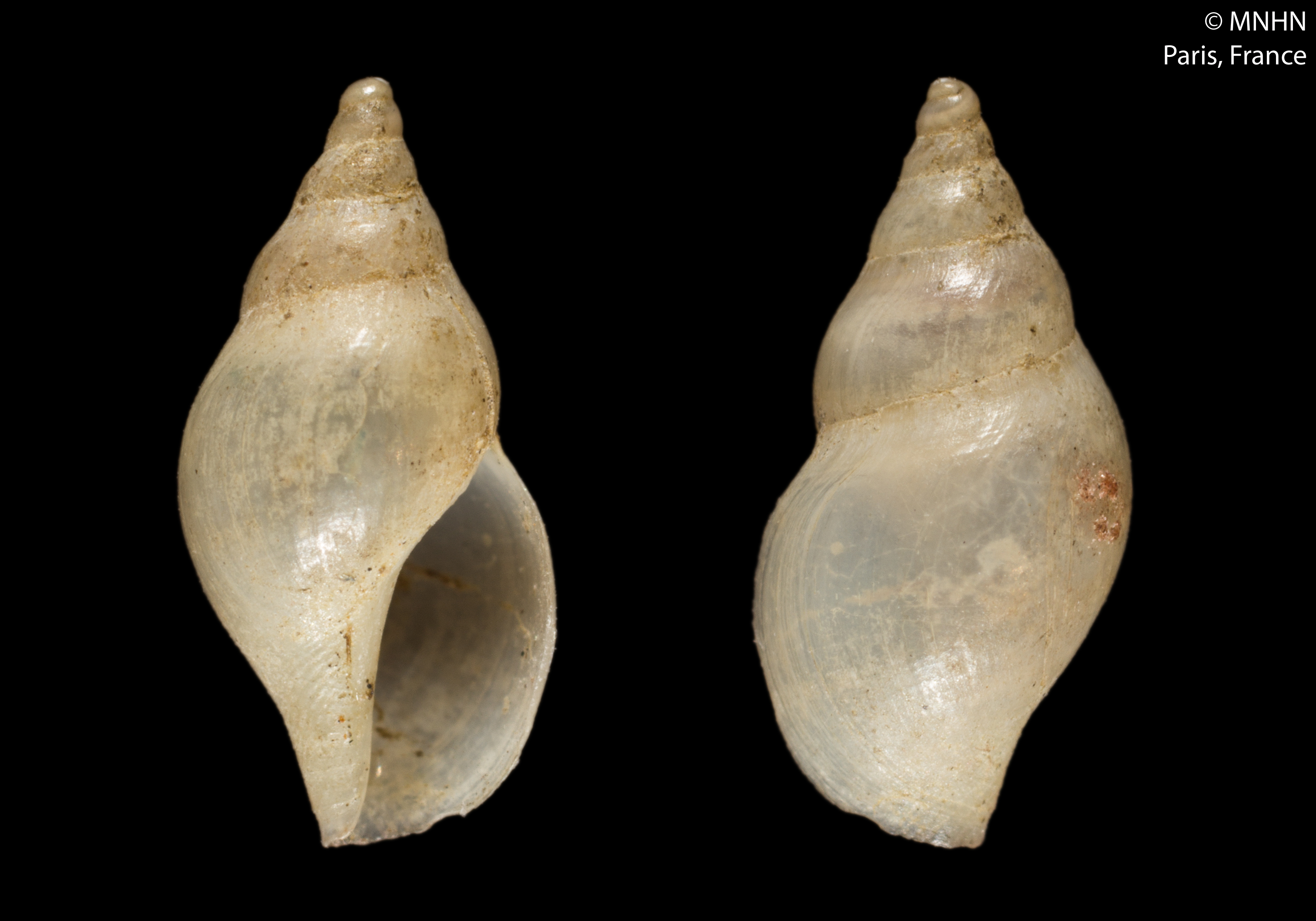
- shell of Typhlodaphne payeni (syntype at MNHN, Paris)

Scientific classification
- Kingdom: Animalia
- Phylum: Mollusca
- Class: Gastropoda
- Subclass: Caenogastropoda
- Order: Neogastropoda
- Superfamily: Conoidea
- Family: Borsoniidae
- Genus: Typhlodaphne
- Species: T. payeni

Binomial name
- Typhlodaphne payeni (Rochebrune & Mabille, 1885)

Synonyms
- Daphnella payeni Rochebrune & Mabille, 1885

= Typhlodaphne payeni =

Species of gastropod

Typhlodaphne payeni is a species of sea snail, a marine gastropod mollusk in the family Borsoniidae.

== Description ==
The shell grows to a length of 10 mm.

== Distribution ==
This marine species occurs off Tierra del Fuego.
