= Euglandina bailyi =

Scientific classification
- Kingdom: Animalia
- Phylum: Mollusca
- Class: Gastropoda
- Order: Stylommatophora
- Family: Spiraxidae
- Genus: Euglandina
- Species: E. bailyi

Binomial name
- Euglandina bailyi M. Smith, 1950

Species of gastropod

Euglandina bailyi is a species of large predatory air-breathing land snail, a terrestrial pulmonate gastropod mollusk in the family Spiraxidae.
