= Decipifus cingulatus =

Scientific classification
- Kingdom: Animalia
- Phylum: Mollusca
- Class: Gastropoda
- Subclass: Caenogastropoda
- Order: Neogastropoda
- Superfamily: Buccinoidea
- Family: Columbellidae
- Genus: Decipifus
- Species: D. cingulatus

Binomial name
- Decipifus cingulatus (Lussi, 2009)

Synonyms
- Anachis cingulata Lussi, 2009 (basionym)

Species of gastropod

Decipifus cingulatus is a species of sea snail, a marine gastropod mollusc in the family Columbellidae, the dove snails.
