= Thesbia unica =

Scientific classification
- Kingdom: Animalia
- Phylum: Mollusca
- Class: Gastropoda
- Subclass: Caenogastropoda
- Order: Neogastropoda
- Superfamily: Conoidea
- Family: Raphitomidae
- Genus: Thesbia
- Species: T. unica

Binomial name
- Thesbia unica Sysoev, 1988

Species of gastropod

Thesbia unica is a species of sea snail, a marine gastropod mollusk in the family Raphitomidae.

== Distribution ==
This abyssal marine species was found on the Kurile-Kamchatka Trench, Northern Pacific
