= Euglandina candida =

Scientific classification
- Kingdom: Animalia
- Phylum: Mollusca
- Class: Gastropoda
- Order: Stylommatophora
- Family: Spiraxidae
- Genus: Euglandina
- Species: E. candida

Binomial name
- Euglandina candida (Shuttleworth, 1852)

Species of gastropod

Euglandina candida is a species of predatory air-breathing land snail, a terrestrial pulmonate gastropod mollusk in the family Spiraxidae.

== Subspecies ==
- Euglandina candida conularis (Pfeiffer, 1855)
