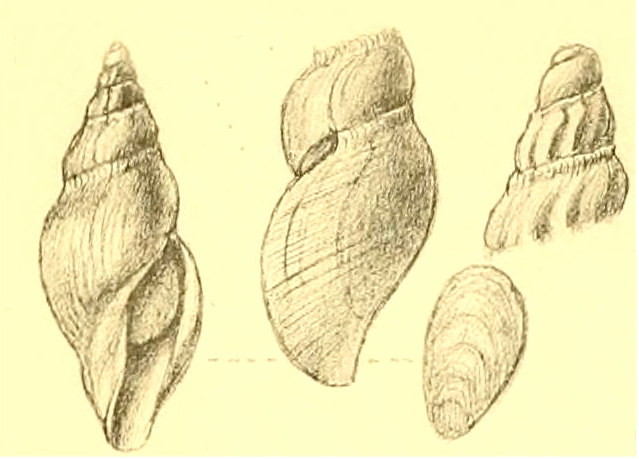
- Original drawing of a shell with protoconch and operculum of Typhlodaphne purissima

Scientific classification
- Kingdom: Animalia
- Phylum: Mollusca
- Class: Gastropoda
- Subclass: Caenogastropoda
- Order: Neogastropoda
- Superfamily: Conoidea
- Family: Borsoniidae
- Genus: Typhlodaphne
- Species: T. purissima

Binomial name
- Typhlodaphne purissima (Strebel, 1908)

Synonyms
- Bela purissima Strebel, 1908; Mangelia purissima (Strebel, 1908)

= Typhlodaphne purissima =

Species of gastropod

Typhlodaphne purissima is a species of sea snail, a marine gastropod mollusk in the family Borsoniidae.

== Description ==
The shell grows to a length of 27 mm.

== Distribution ==
This marine species occurs off Argentina, Tierra del Fuego and South Georgia Islands at depths between 94 m and 160 m.
