= Decipifus =

Scientific classification
- Kingdom: Animalia
- Phylum: Mollusca
- Class: Gastropoda
- Subclass: Caenogastropoda
- Order: Neogastropoda
- Superfamily: Buccinoidea
- Family: Columbellidae
- Genus: Decipifus; Olsson & McGinty, 1958

Type species
- Decipifus sixaolus Olsson & McGinty, 1958

Genus of gastropods

Decipifus is a genus of sea snails, marine gastropod mollusks in the family Columbellidae, the dove snails.

== Species ==
Species within the genus Decipifus include:

- Decipifus algoensis (Thiele, 1925)
- Decipifus cingulatus (Lussi, 2009)
- Decipifus consanguineus (G.B. Sowerby III, 1897)
- Decipifus dictynna Dall, 1919
- Decipifus gracilis McLean, 1959
- Decipifus kristenseni De Jong & Coomans, 1988
- Decipifus lyrta (Baker, Hanna & Strong, 1938)
- Decipifus macleani Keen, 1971
- Decipifus metellus (Thiele, 1925)
- Decipifus serratus (Carpenter, 1857)
- Decipifus sixaolus Olsson & McGinty, 1958
