= Euglandina turris =

Scientific classification
- Kingdom: Animalia
- Phylum: Mollusca
- Class: Gastropoda
- Order: Stylommatophora
- Family: Spiraxidae
- Genus: Euglandina
- Species: E. turris

Binomial name
- Euglandina turris (Pfeiffer, 1846)

Species of gastropod

Euglandina turris is a species of predatory air-breathing land snail, a terrestrial pulmonate gastropod mollusk in the family Spiraxidae.

== Subspecies ==
- Euglandina turris longurio Pilsbry & Cockerell, 1926
