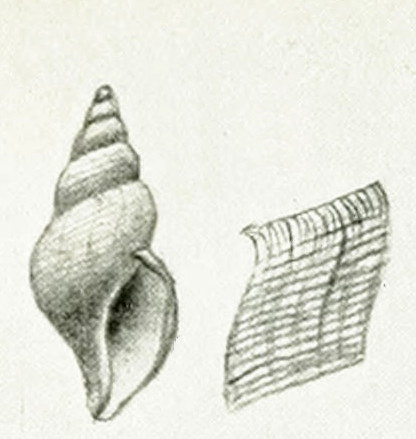
- Original drawing of a shell and its sculpture of Typhlodaphne filostriata

Scientific classification
- Kingdom: Animalia
- Phylum: Mollusca
- Class: Gastropoda
- Subclass: Caenogastropoda
- Order: Neogastropoda
- Superfamily: Conoidea
- Family: Borsoniidae
- Genus: Typhlodaphne
- Species: T. filostriata

Binomial name
- Typhlodaphne filostriata (Strebel, 1905)

Synonyms
- Thesbia filostriata Strebel, 1905

= Typhlodaphne filostriata =

Species of gastropod

Typhlodaphne filostriata is a species of sea snail, a marine gastropod mollusk in the family Borsoniidae.

== Distribution ==
This marine species occurs in the Strait of Magellan off Cape Horn.
