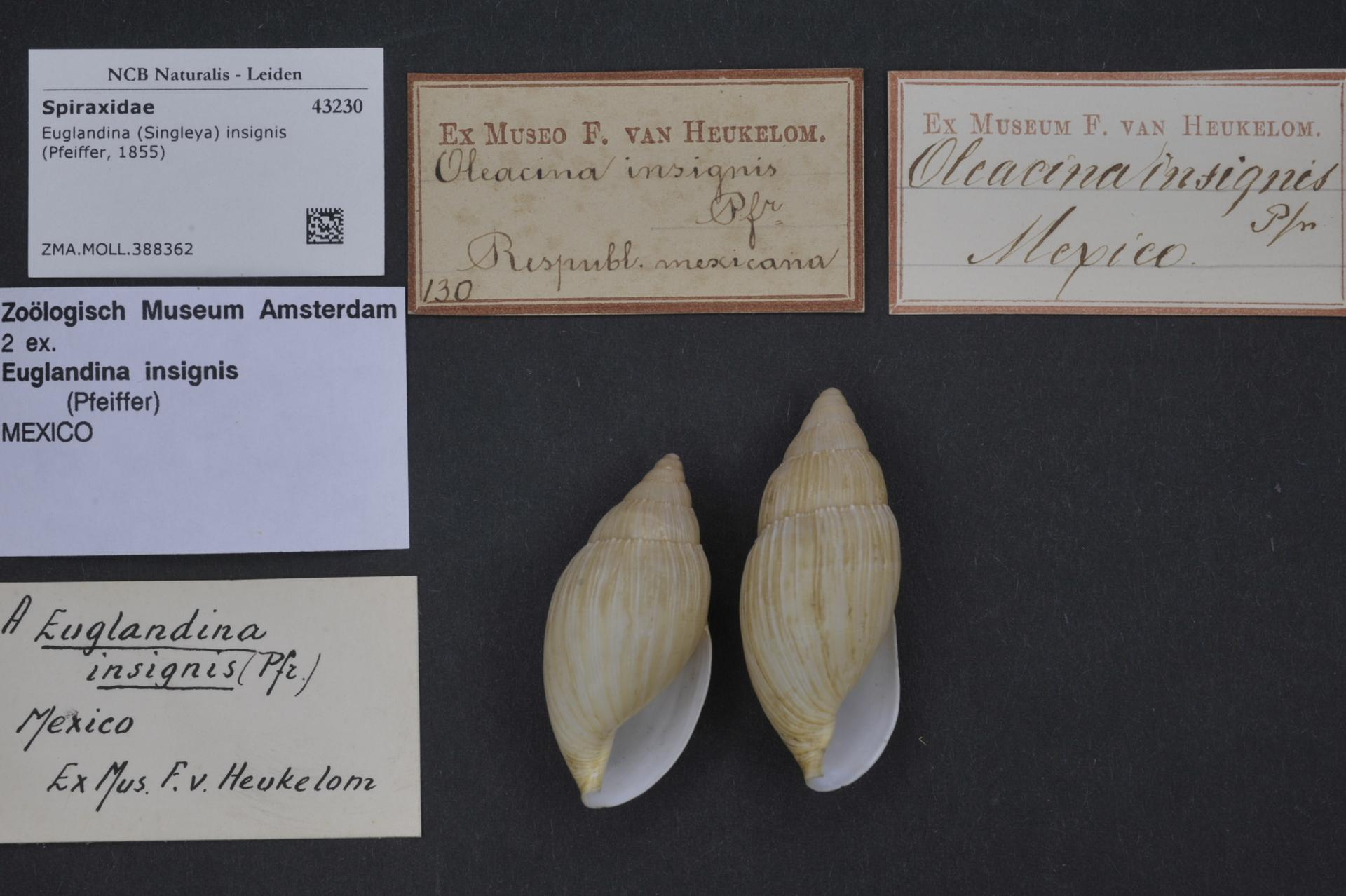
- Euglandina insignis

Scientific classification
- Kingdom: Animalia
- Phylum: Mollusca
- Class: Gastropoda
- Order: Stylommatophora
- Family: Spiraxidae
- Genus: Euglandina
- Species: E. insignis

Binomial name
- Euglandina insignis (Pfeiffer, 1855)

= Euglandina insignis =

Species of gastropod

Euglandina insignis is a species of predatory air-breathing land snail, a terrestrial pulmonate gastropod mollusk in the family Spiraxidae.
