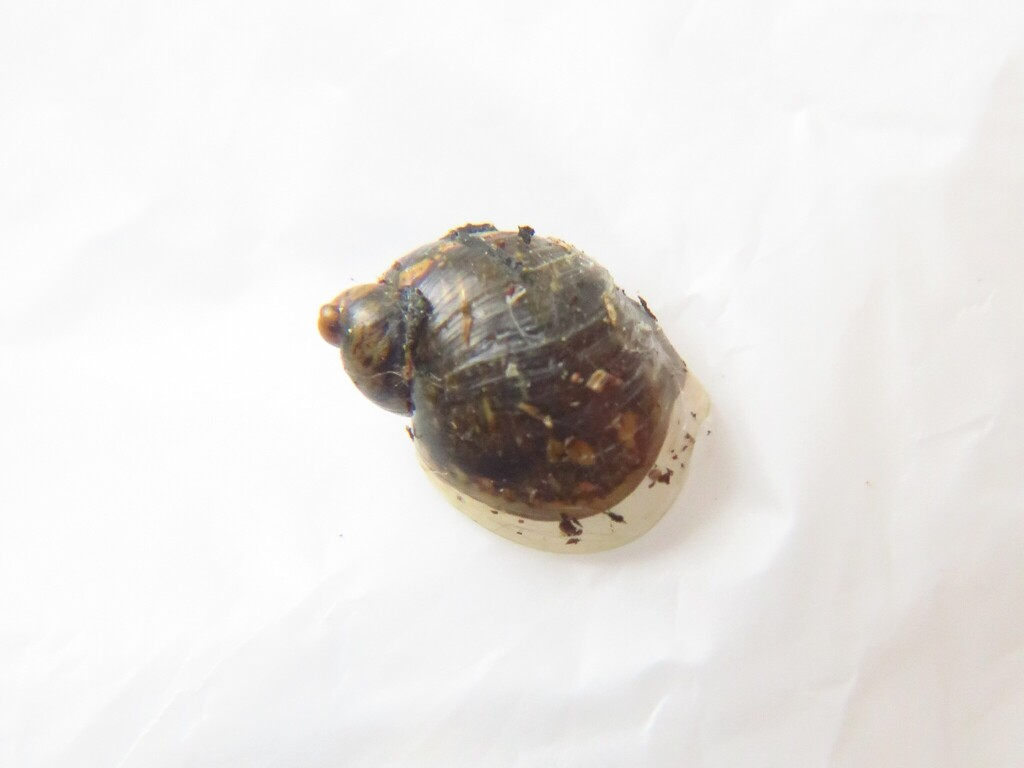

Conservation status
- Apparently Secure (NatureServe)

Scientific classification
- Kingdom: Animalia
- Phylum: Mollusca
- Class: Gastropoda
- Order: Stylommatophora
- Family: Succineidae
- Genus: Succinea
- Species: S. costaricana

Binomial name
- Succinea costaricana von Martens, 1898

= Succinea costaricana =

Species of gastropod

Succinea costaricana is a species of air-breathing land snail, a terrestrial pulmonate gastropod mollusc in the family Succineidae, the amber snails. The individuals can reach up to 13.5 mm long. When reproducing, females can lay 7 eggs per cluster; each egg measuring 1.4 mm diameter. Embryos measure approximately 0.3 mm, while its shell can reach around 0.8 mm in length. The animals can reproduce at 12 weeks of age and their lifespan is approximately 44 weeks.

== Distribution ==
The distribution of this species is Neotropical and includes:

- Costa Rica
- Mexico

== Ecology ==
Succinea costaricana usually lives under leaf litter. In Costa Rica the species reproduces all year round.

== Human importance ==
Succinea costaricana is quarantine pest, which damages ornamental plants. In 1992, an estimated population density at an ornamental plant farm growing Dracaena in Limón Province, Costa Rica, was 282,900 snails per ha.

It was scarce in the rainforest, when they cleared the forest for crops, and eliminated their predators and parasites, the population exploded. Is considered one of the few successful cases in the control of a mollusc pest, since changes in the cultivation techniques ended with it.
