= Euglandina mazatlanica =

Scientific classification
- Kingdom: Animalia
- Phylum: Mollusca
- Class: Gastropoda
- Order: Stylommatophora
- Family: Spiraxidae
- Genus: Euglandina
- Species: E. mazatlanica

Binomial name
- Euglandina mazatlanica (Von Martens, 1891)

Species of gastropod

Euglandina mazatlanica is a species of predatory air-breathing land snail, a terrestrial pulmonate gastropod mollusk in the family Spiraxidae.

== Subspecies ==
- Euglandina mazatlanica abbreviata (Von Martens, 1891)
