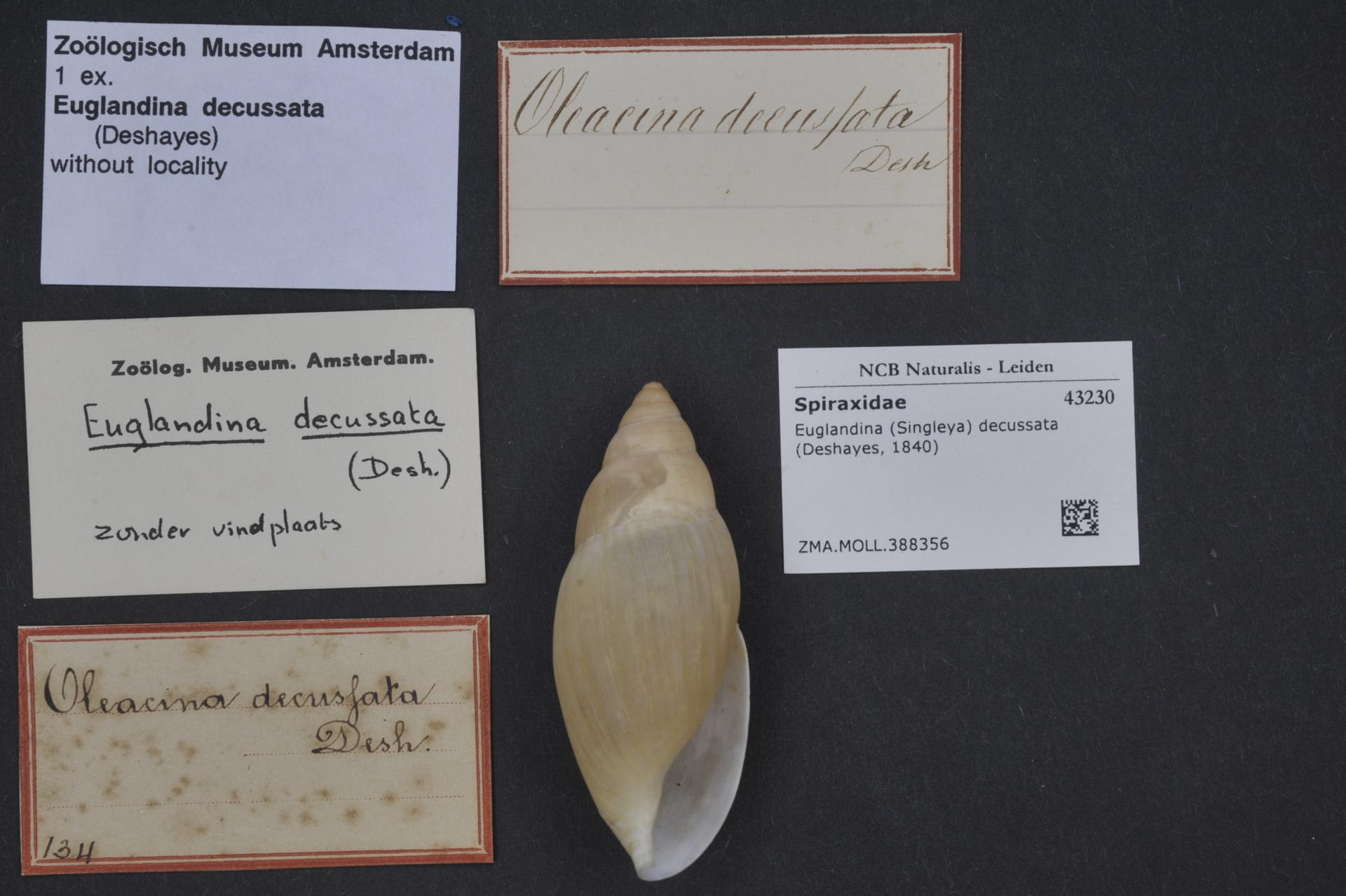
- Euglandina (Singleya) decussata (Deshayes, 1840)

Scientific classification
- Kingdom: Animalia
- Phylum: Mollusca
- Class: Gastropoda
- Order: Stylommatophora
- Family: Spiraxidae
- Genus: Euglandina
- Species: E. decussata

Binomial name
- Euglandina decussata (Deshayes, 1840)

= Euglandina decussata =

Species of gastropod

Euglandina decussata is a species of predatory air-breathing land snail, a terrestrial pulmonate gastropod mollusk in the family Spiraxidae.
