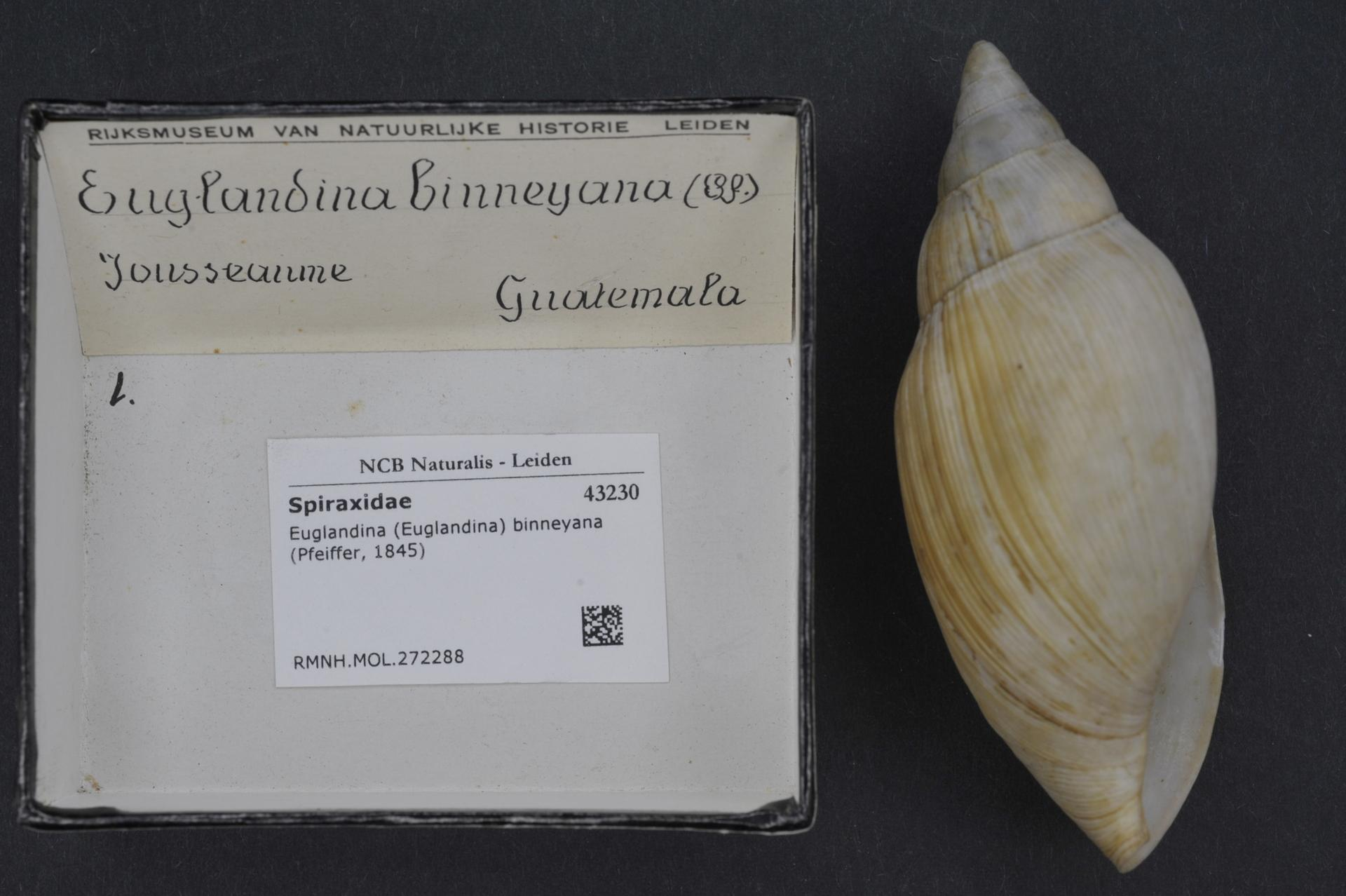

Scientific classification
- Kingdom: Animalia
- Phylum: Mollusca
- Class: Gastropoda
- Order: Stylommatophora
- Family: Spiraxidae
- Genus: Euglandina
- Species: E. binneyana

Binomial name
- Euglandina binneyana (Pfeiffer, 1845)

= Euglandina binneyana =

Species of gastropod

Euglandina binneyana is a species of large predatory air-breathing land snail, a terrestrial pulmonate gastropod mollusk in the family Spiraxidae.
