= Euglandina pilsbryi =

Scientific classification
- Kingdom: Animalia
- Phylum: Mollusca
- Class: Gastropoda
- Order: Stylommatophora
- Family: Spiraxidae
- Genus: Euglandina
- Species: E. pilsbryi

Binomial name
- Euglandina pilsbryi Bartsch, 1909

Species of gastropod

Euglandina pilsbryi is a species of predatory air-breathing land snail, a terrestrial pulmonate gastropod mollusk in the family Spiraxidae.

The specific name pilsbryi is in honor of American malacologist Henry Augustus Pilsbry.
