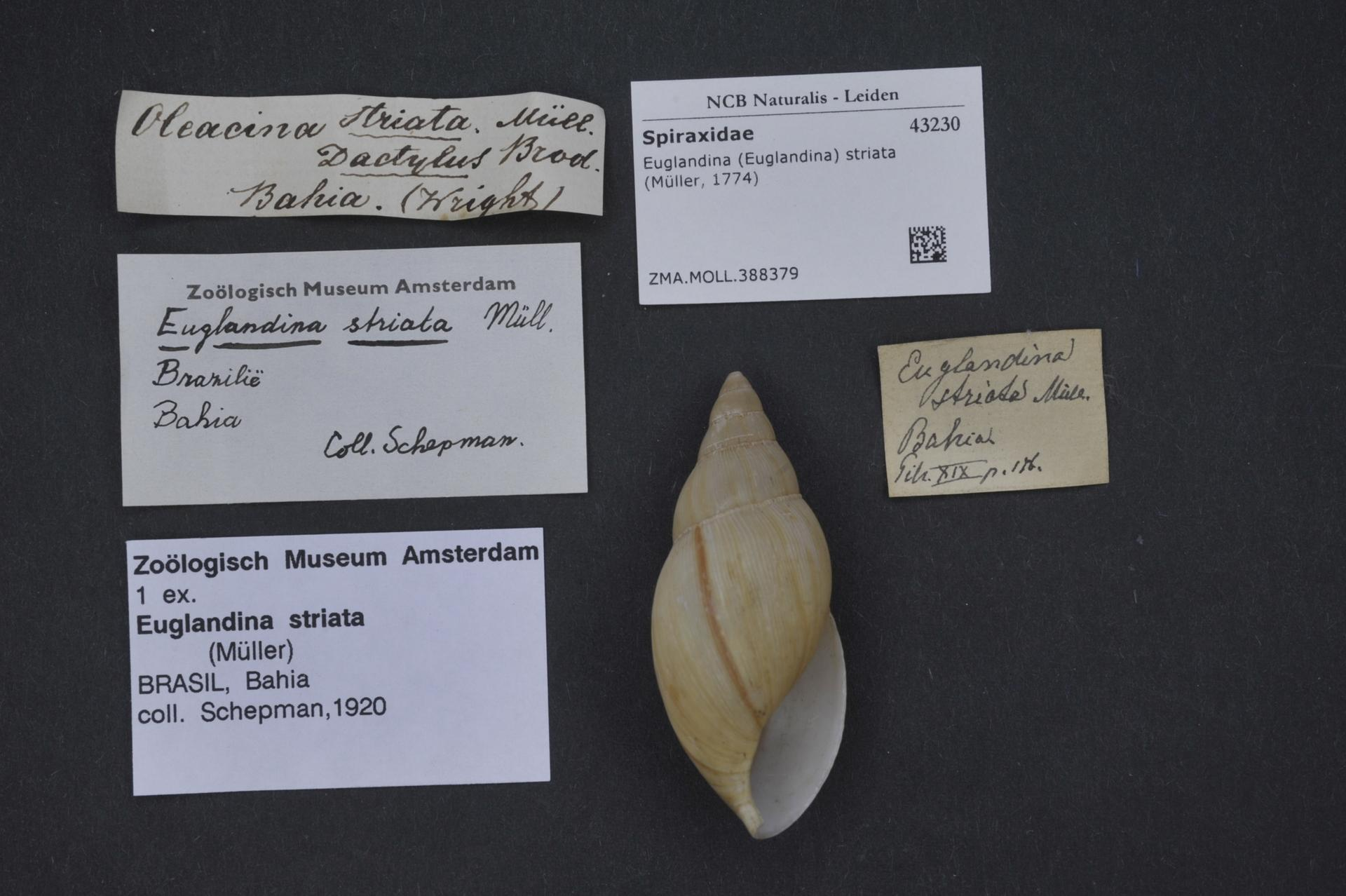

Scientific classification
- Kingdom: Animalia
- Phylum: Mollusca
- Class: Gastropoda
- Order: Stylommatophora
- Family: Spiraxidae
- Genus: Euglandina
- Species: E. striata

Binomial name
- Euglandina striata (O. F. Müller, 1774)

= Euglandina striata =

Species of gastropod

Euglandina striata is a species of predatory air-breathing land snail, a terrestrial pulmonate gastropod mollusk in the family Spiraxidae.
