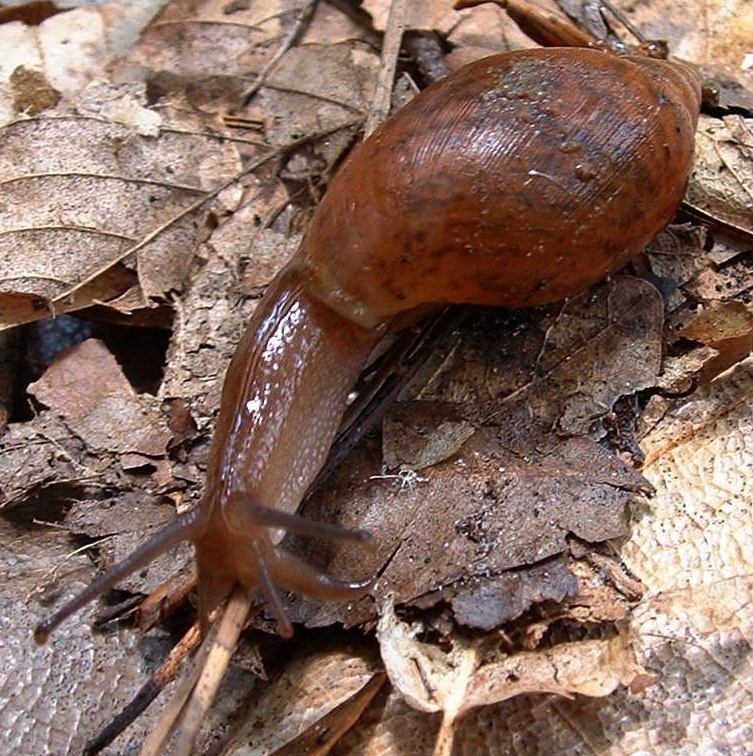
- A live individual of Euglandina rosea

Scientific classification
- Kingdom: Animalia
- Phylum: Mollusca
- Class: Gastropoda
- Order: Stylommatophora
- Family: Spiraxidae
- Subfamily: Euglandininae
- Genus: Euglandina; Crosse & Fischer, 1870

Diversity
- At least 44 species

Synonyms
- Euglandina (Cosmomenus) H. B. Baker, 1941· accepted, alternate representation; Euglandina (Euglandina) Crosse & P. Fischer, 1870· accepted, alternate representation; Euglandina (Singleya) H. B. Baker, 1941· accepted, alternate representation; Pfaffia Behn, 1845

= Euglandina =

Genus of gastropods

Euglandina is a genus of predatory medium- to large-sized, air-breathing, land snails, terrestrial pulmonate gastropod mollusks in the family Spiraxidae.

These snails were previously placed in the family Oleacinidae (according to the taxonomy of the Gastropoda by Bouchet & Rocroi, 2005).

Euglandina is the type genus of the subfamily Euglandininae. The pulmonate genus Euglandina is often referred to as Glandina in older literature, and the most widely known species, Euglandina rosea, may commonly be found under the synonym Glandina truncata.

These snails are especially notable for being carnivorous and predatory. They are sometimes called "wolf snails" for that reason.

== Distribution ==
The natural range of Euglandina encompasses much of the tropical and subtropical Western Hemisphere, including the Southeastern United States to Texas, Mexico, and various locations in Central and South America. The species E. rosea has been intentionally introduced into many other warm areas — from Hawaii to New Guinea, Bermuda, Sri Lanka, Mauritius, and numerous other locations — in a vain attempt to control accidentally introduced species of snails, usually the giant African Lissachatina fulica.

Those species of Euglandina that are not indigenous to the USA have not yet become established there, but they are considered to represent a potentially serious threat as a pest, an invasive species that could negatively affect agriculture, natural ecosystems, human health, or commerce. Therefore, these species should be given top national quarantine significance in the USA.

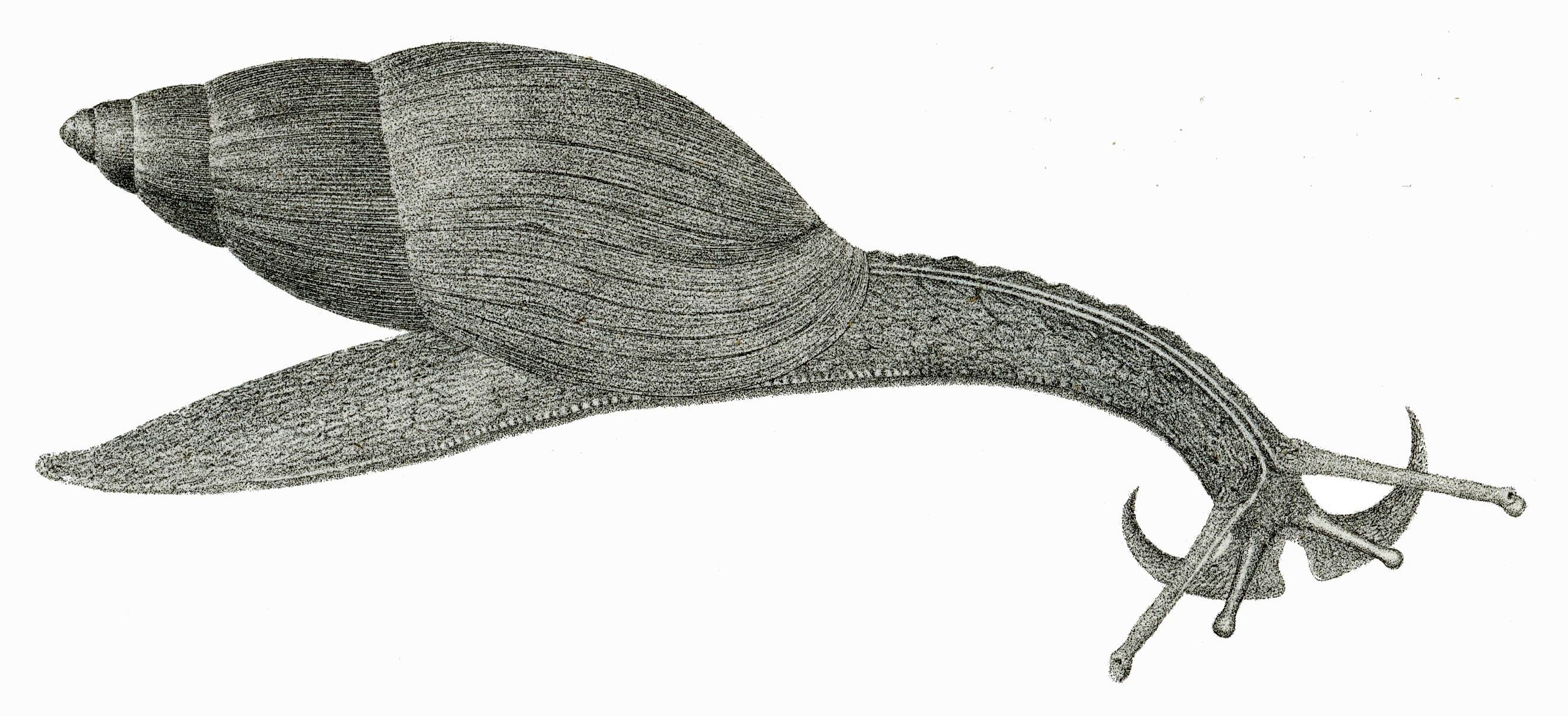
Euglandina rosea from W. G. Binney, 1878

== Species ==
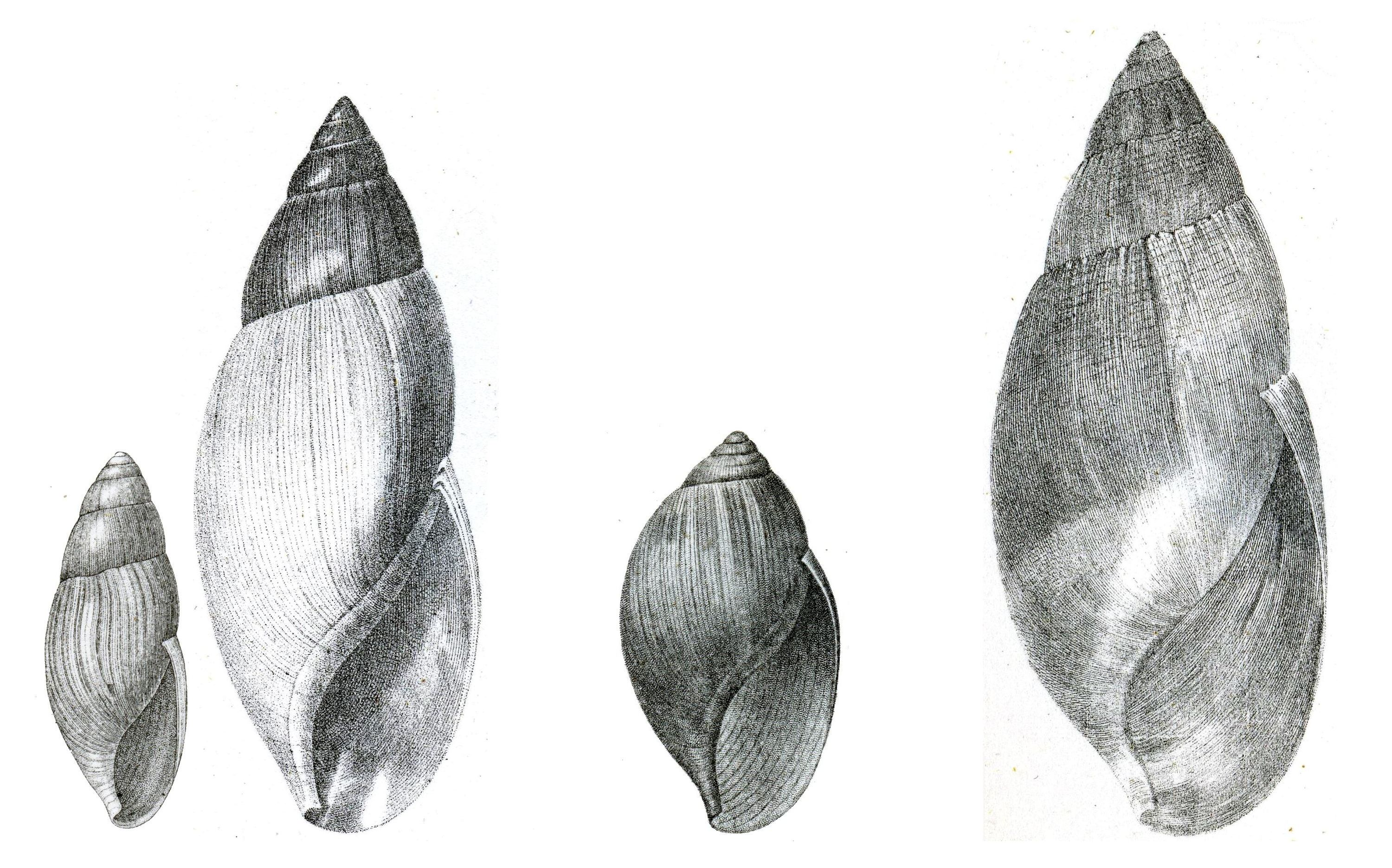
Left to right:E. rosea (two specimens), E. r. bullata, and E. vanuxemensis from W. G. Binney, 1878

The three subgenera and species in the genus Euglandina include:

Subgenus Euglandina Crosse & Fischer, 1870

- Euglandina anomala (Angas, 1879)
- Euglandina aurata (Morelet, 1849) - type species
- Euglandina aurantiaca Angas, 1879
- Euglandina bailyi M. Smith, 1950
- Euglandina binneyana (Pfeiffer, 1845)
- Euglandina broctontomlini Pilsbry, 1926
- Euglandina cognata (Strebel, 1875)
- Euglandina cuneus (Von Martens, 1891)
- Euglandina cumingi cumingi Beck, 1837
- Euglandina cumingi rubromarginata Martens, 1891
- Euglandina cylindracea Phillips, 1846
- Euglandina dactylus (Broderip, 1832)
- Euglandina daudebarti (Deshayes, 1850)
  - Euglandina daudebarti amoena (Von Martens, 1865)
  - Euglandina daudebarti jalapana (Von Martens, 1891)
  - Euglandina daudebarti miradorensis (Strebel, 1878)
- Euglandina gigantea Pilsbry, 1926
- Euglandina huingensis (Pilsbry, 1903)
- Euglandina immemorata Pilsbry, 1907
- Euglandina indusiata (Pfeiffer, 1860)
- Euglandina isabellina Pfeiffer, 1846)
- Euglandina lamyi (Fischer & Chatelet, 1903)
- Euglandina liebmanni (Pfeiffer, 1846)
- Euglandina livida Dall, 1908
- Euglandina michoacanensis (Pilsbry, 1899)
- Euglandina mitriformis (Angas, 1879)
- Euglandina monilifera Pfeiffer, 1845
  - Euglandina monilifera pulcherrima Pfeiffer, 1845
- Euglandina pan Thompson, 1987
- Euglandina pilsbryi Bartsch, 1909
- Euglandina pinicola (Fischer & Crosse, 1870)
- Euglandina pittieri (Martens, 1901)
- Euglandina radula (Strebel, 1875)
- Euglandina rosea (Férussac, 1821)
- Euglandina sowerbyana (Pfeiffer, 1846)
  - Euglandina sowerbyana estephaniae (Strebel, 1875)
- Euglandina striata (Müller, 1774)
- Euglandina texasiana (Pfeiffer, 1856)
- Euglandina texasiana angustior Pilsbry & Vanatta, 1936
- Euglandina titan Thompson, 1987
- Euglandina vanuxemensis (Lea, 1834)

Subgenus Singleya H. B. Baker, 1941

- Euglandina anomala (Angas, 1879)
  - Euglandina anomala barrocoloradensis Pilsbry, 1930
- Euglandina balesi Pilsbry, 1938
- Euglandina candida (Shuttleworth, 1852)
  - Euglandina candida conularis (Pfeiffer, 1855)
- Euglandina carminensis (Morelet, 1849)
- Euglandina corneola (W. G. Binney, 1857)
- Euglandina decussata (Deshayes, 1840)
- Euglandina excavata (Von Martens, 1891)
- Euglandina ghiesbreghti (Pfeiffer, 1856)
- Euglandina hererrae (Contreras, 1923)
- Euglandina insignis (Pfeiffer, 1855)
- Euglandina jacksoni Pilsbry & Vanatta, 1936
- Euglandina longula (Fischer & Crosse, 1870)
- Euglandina lowei Pilsbry, 1931
- Euglandina mazatlanica (Von Martens, 1891)
  - Euglandina mazatlanica abbreviata (Von Martens, 1891)
- Euglandina pseudoturris (Strebel, 1875)
- Euglandina singleyana (W. G. Binney, 1878)
- Euglandina tenella (Strebel, 1875)
- Euglandina turris (Pfeiffer, 1846)
  - Euglandina turris longurio Pilsbry & Cockerell, 1926
- Euglandina wani (Jacobson, 1968)

Subgenus Cosmomenus H. B. Baker, 1941

- Euglandina cumingi (Beck, 1827)
- Euglandina cylindracea (Phillips, 1846)

Species brought into synonymy

- Euglandina exesa Cockerell, 1930 - fossil: synonym of Euglandina singleyana (W. G. Binney, 1892)

== Description ==
The various species of Euglandina are similar in numerous ways. The shells are simple, oval in outline (sometimes broadly so), but occasionally more-or-less straight-sided, the lip of the aperture is also simple, without any thickening. These shells may be brown, orange, or pink in color, or some intermediate shade. Shell sculpture when present usually consists of striae that mark progressive growth increments. All species are carnivores, and probably have essentially the same hunting and feeding strategies, and reproductive techniques.

== Habitat ==
Members of this genus can be found in many microhabitats. They can be found in semitropical moist jungle, and in near-desert. Their only requirements seem to be a relatively warm climate, and the presence of a sufficient supply of food.
