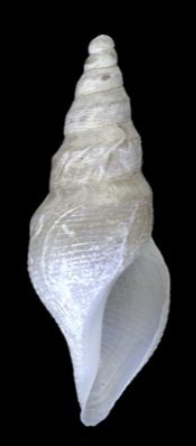

Scientific classification
- Kingdom: Animalia
- Phylum: Mollusca
- Class: Gastropoda
- Subclass: Caenogastropoda
- Order: Neogastropoda
- Superfamily: Conoidea
- Family: Borsoniidae
- Genus: Typhlodaphne
- Species: T. paratenoceras

Binomial name
- Typhlodaphne paratenoceras (Powell, 1951)

Synonyms
- Leucosyrinx paratenoceras Powell, 1951 (original combination)

= Typhlodaphne paratenoceras =

Species of gastropod

Typhlodaphne paratenoceras is a species of sea snail, a marine gastropod mollusk in the family Borsoniidae.

== Description ==
The length of the shell attains around 43.5 mm. It is described as an elongate fusiform. It has eight convex whorls of which two make up a smooth papillate protoconch.

== Distribution ==
This marine species occurs off the South Shetlands, the Scotia Arc in the Scotia Sea, and Antarctic Peninsula.
