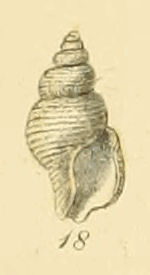
- Thesbia nana shell

Scientific classification
- Kingdom: Animalia
- Phylum: Mollusca
- Class: Gastropoda
- Subclass: Caenogastropoda
- Order: Neogastropoda
- Superfamily: Conoidea
- Family: Raphitomidae
- Genus: Thesbia
- Species: T. nana

Binomial name
- Thesbia nana (Lovén, 1846)

Synonyms
- Fusus albus Forbes, 1847; Mangelia nana; Tritonium nanum Lovén, 1846 (original combination)

= Thesbia nana =

Species of gastropod

Thesbia nana is a species of sea snail, a marine gastropod mollusk in the family Raphitomidae.

== Description ==
The length of the shell attains 12 mm.

The body of the snail is milk-white, all but the gills and liver, which are light brown. The tentacles are cylindrical, rather short. The eyes are proportionally large, placed on the tentacles, close to their outer bases. The foot nis arrow and thin.

The shell is spindle-shaped, thin, semitransparent, and glossy. The sculpture shows numerous fine and narrow spiral impressed hues, of which there are about a dozen on the penultimate whorl. They are closely and regularly punctured, so as to form rows of circular dots. The top whorls are very closely and microscopically corrugated in the same direction. The colour is uniform milk-white. There is no epidermis perceptible . The spire is tapering. The apex is abruptly twisted. The shell contains 4½ to 5½ whorls, convex and evenly rounded, rather suddenly enlarging; the last occupies about three-fifths of the shell. The suture is deep, somewhat oblique. The aperture is irregularly oblong, acute-angled above. Its length (including the siphonal canal) is two-fifths of the shel. The siphonal canal is rather broad, inclining a little (but not abruptly) to the left, and ending in a slight and obliquely curved notch. The outer lip is flexuous, retreating at the upper part, but without exhibiting any fissure or notch . It folds inwards rather than outwards. The edge is sharp and thin. Inside it isquite smooth. The inner lip is slight, narrow, and even. The columella is flexuous. The fold is obscure. There is no operculum.

== Distribution ==
This species occurs in the Atlantic Ocean from Eastern Canada to Norway and the Barentz Sea.
