= Euglandina anomala =

Scientific classification
- Kingdom: Animalia
- Phylum: Mollusca
- Class: Gastropoda
- Order: Stylommatophora
- Family: Spiraxidae
- Genus: Euglandina
- Species: E. anomala

Binomial name
- Euglandina anomala (Angas, 1879)

Species of gastropod

Euglandina anomala is a species of predatory air-breathing land snail, a terrestrial pulmonate gastropod mollusk in the family Spiraxidae.

== Subspecies ==
- Euglandina anomala barrocoloradensis Pilsbry, 1930
