= Pleurotomella nipri =

Scientific classification
- Kingdom: Animalia
- Phylum: Mollusca
- Class: Gastropoda
- Subclass: Caenogastropoda
- Order: Neogastropoda
- Superfamily: Conoidea
- Family: Raphitomidae
- Genus: Pleurotomella
- Species: P. nipri

Binomial name
- Pleurotomella nipri Numanami, 1996

Synonyms
- Pleurotomella (Anomalotomella) nipri (Numanami, 1996)· accepted, alternate representation; Typhlodaphne nipri Numanami, 1996 (original combination)

Species of gastropod

Pleurotomella nipri is a species of sea snail, a marine gastropod mollusk in the family Raphitomidae.

== Distribution ==
This marine species occurs off East Antarctica
