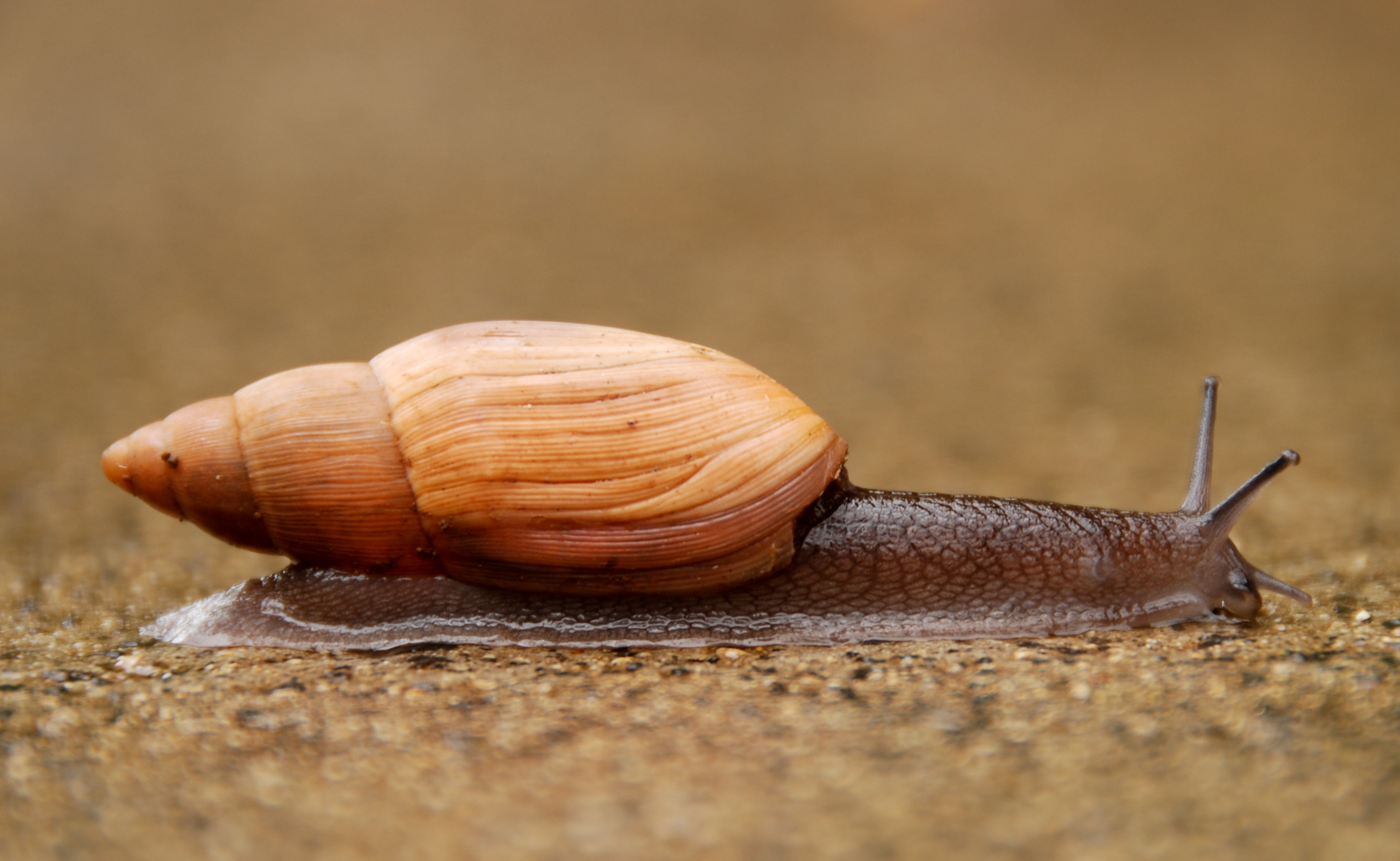
- A live individual of Euglandina rosea

Conservation status
- Secure (NatureServe)

Scientific classification
- Kingdom: Animalia
- Phylum: Mollusca
- Class: Gastropoda
- Order: Stylommatophora
- Family: Spiraxidae
- Genus: Euglandina
- Species: E. rosea

Binomial name
- Euglandina rosea (Ferussac, 1818)

Synonyms
- Achatina rosea Férussac, 1821 (original combination); Glandina bullata Gould, 1848; Glandina corneola W. G. Binney, 1857; Glandina parallela W. G. Binney, 1857; Glandina truncata Say, 1831; Glandina truncata var. abbreviata Martens in Albers, 1860; Glandina truncata var. macer Dall, 1890; Glandina truncata var. minor W. G. Binney, 1885; Glandina truncata var. minor Pilsbry, 1899; Glandina truncata var. ovata Dall, 1890; Helix (Cochlicopa) rosea Férussac, 1821

= Euglandina rosea =

Species of gastropod

Euglandina rosea, the rosy wolfsnail or cannibal snail, is a species of medium-sized to large predatory air-breathing land snail, a carnivorous terrestrial pulmonate gastropod mollusk in the family Spiraxidae.

This species is a fast and voracious predator, hunting and eating other snails and slugs. The rosy wolfsnail was introduced into Hawaii in 1955 as a biological control for the invasive African land snail, Lissachatina fulica. This snail is responsible for the extinction of an estimated eight native snail species in Hawaii. This has caused the snail to be added to the IUCN's top 100 most invasive species.

== Description ==
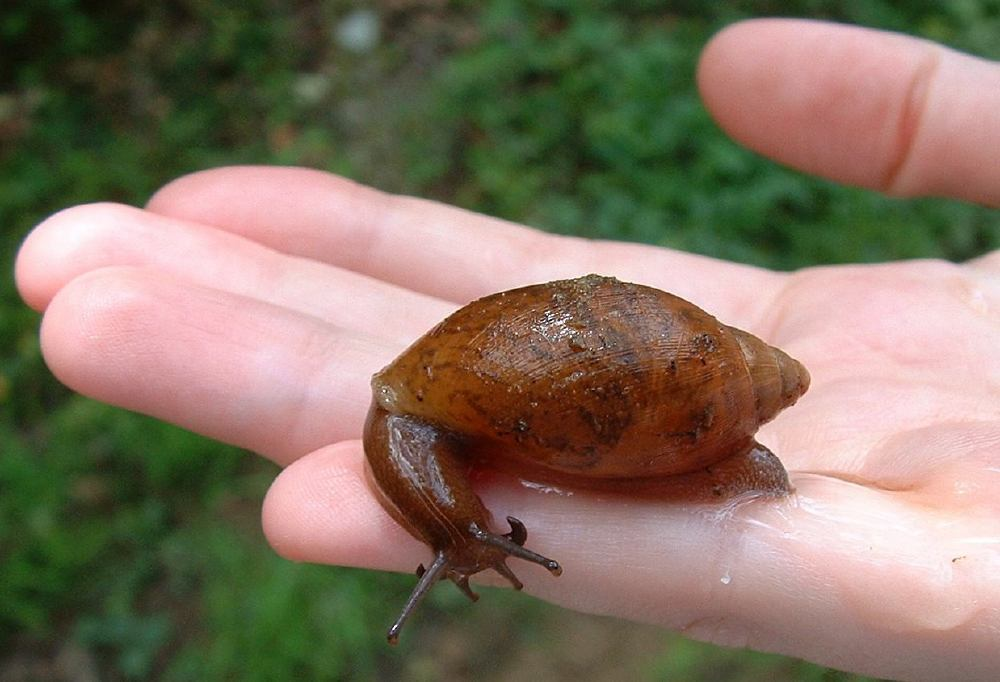
Euglandina rosea from NW Florida

The rosy wolfsnail lives around 24 months. The snail takes 30–40 days to hatch and is then considered young (before sexual maturity). Sexual maturity begins between 4 and 16 months after hatching. The snail is relatively fast moving at about 8 mm/s. The snail has a light grey or brown body, with its lower tentacles being long and almost touching the ground. The shell has usual dimensions of 76 mm long and 27.5 mm in diameter. The shape of the shell tapers to a point at both ends (fusiform) with a narrow oval- to crescent-shaped opening and a shortened axis of the spiral shell near the opening (truncated columella). The shell has a brownish pink color. The full-grown adult snail ranges in size from 7–10 cm in length.

== Ecology ==
This species is found naturally in the Southern United States, usually in hardwood forests and urban gardens. It is a fast and voracious predator, hunting and eating other snails and slugs. The smaller prey species are ingested whole or sucked out of their shells. This gives it the nickname "the cannibal snail". Rosy wolfsnails use slime trails to track their prey and potential mates, resulting in rosy wolfsnails following these trails more than 80% of the time they are alive. The rosy wolfsnail prefers to consume smaller snails because these are quicker and easier to eat.

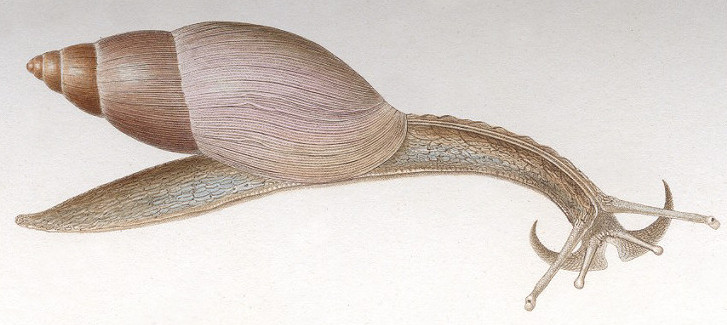
A hand painted engraved drawing of E. rosea published in 1857

The rosy wolfsnail is specialized for carnivory, its buccal mass being totally contained within a beak-like rostrum that can be extended, thus allowing the toothed radula to be ejected past the mouth and into the snail's prey. The radula is enlarged and has teeth specialized into elongated cones.

The four main mammalian predators for the rosy wolfsnail are rats, tenrecs, pigs, and mongooses. The rats consume the snail by chewing the top of the shell off. The tenrecs crack the shell into large pieces. The pigs have a tendency to crush the shell completely. The mongooses attack the body of the snail. Cannibalism among adults has also been seen in the rosy wolfsnail. However, this has only been observed in captive populations and appears to be a rare occurrence.

Diseases affect the survival of the rosy wolfsnail, as well. One disease known to affect the snail is caused by the pseudomonad bacterium Aeromonas hydrophila. Infection occurs by ingesting the bacteria, if they contaminate the snail's food, or by contact with another individual that is infected. This causes reduced digestive function, resulting in emaciation even when food is abundant. This finally results in a slow death by starvation.

The rosy wolf snail is a hermaphrodite and is oviparous. The courtship rituals for the snail begin with one following the trail of another snail. The pursuing snail then mounts the rear side of the shell of the snail it was following. Following this mounting, a head-waving display ensues, where the pursuing snail vigorously shakes its head for 15 minutes. This ultimately ends with a short period of inactivity, where the mounted snail turns its head to face its own shell. Following this, copulation occurs, with the one snail still mounted on the shell of the other, the two heads are brought together, and then twisted around each other's necks, enabling genital contact. This copulation then lasts up to four hours. An adult snail lays 25–35 eggs in a shallow pocket of soil and the eggs hatch after 30–40 days.

The snail has been known to go into hibernation during winter and emerge in April/May.

== Distribution and habitat ==
The rosy wolfsnail is native to the Southeastern United States, including Florida and Georgia. Other species of the genus are native to South and Central America. They have also been spotted in Oslo Norway.

== As an invasive species ==
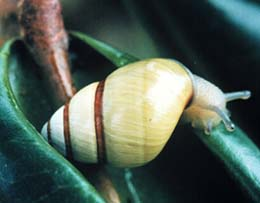
An O'ahu tree snail, one of the primary species threatened by introduced rosy wolfsnails.

The rosy wolfsnail has become an invasive species in many areas outside its native range, including in Hawaii. These predatory snails were originally introduced to Hawaii in an attempt to eliminate another invasive species, the giant African land snail, Lissachatina fulica. The introduction occurred in 1955, when specimens were collected from Florida and sent to Hawaii. During the same year, 616 individuals were released on Oahu. In 1958 12,000 were taken from Oahu and introduced onto eight other Pacific islands. This did not, however, reduce the populations of A. fulica, but rather caused a decline in native snail populations. The introduced species vigorously attacked the endemic O'ahu tree snail. As a result, many tree snail species were hunted to extinction within the first year. These predatory snails continue to represent a threat to the local snail fauna.

Of all known mollusk extinctions since 1500, about 70% are from islands, and an estimated one-third of these were caused by introduced E. rosea. These prey snails were at an increased risk of predation-caused extinction because of their extremely low reproduction rates. The rosy wolfsnail has caused the extinction of an estimated eight native snail species in Hawaii. Due to this, the International Union for Conservation of Nature (IUCN) has placed the rosy wolfsnail on the list of the top 100 worst invasive alien species in the world.

=== Control strategies ===
One strategy to protect native snails from the predatory rosy wolfsnail has been to breed the native tree snails in captivity, then introduce the small population into a predator-proof patch of forest. This forest patch consists of a galvanized iron barrier; at the base of the iron barrier, a plastic trough was attached and filled with salt and then a pair of electric wires connected to a battery. This created a protected enclosure with both chemical and electrical defenses. The enclosure allows the native snails to breed in a safe location, but does not allow them to travel outside of the protected area.

Other forms of control for the rosy wolfsnail have been investigated. The three main methods of control being used or discussed are collection and chemical and biological control. The use of collection has not been extensively used because it is too labor-intensive and time-consuming. Chemical poisoning has been used extensively in many areas, though it is not very effective in controlling the E. rosea population. Biological control has been a favored option.

=== Policy and laws ===
The rosy wolfsnail is now legally considered to be a "noxious species in French Polynesia". This means that live individuals cannot be brought to the islands. The IUCN states that the introduction of the rosy wolfsnail to non-native habitats is now formally discouraged.
