= Euglandina gigantea =

Scientific classification
- Kingdom: Animalia
- Phylum: Mollusca
- Class: Gastropoda
- Order: Stylommatophora
- Family: Spiraxidae
- Genus: Euglandina
- Species: E. gigantea

Binomial name
- Euglandina gigantea Pilsbry, 1926

Species of gastropod

Euglandina gigantea is a species of predatory air-breathing land snail, a terrestrial pulmonate gastropod mollusk in the family Spiraxidae.
