= Decipifus algoensis =

Scientific classification
- Kingdom: Animalia
- Phylum: Mollusca
- Class: Gastropoda
- Subclass: Caenogastropoda
- Order: Neogastropoda
- Superfamily: Buccinoidea
- Family: Columbellidae
- Genus: Decipifus
- Species: D. algoensis

Binomial name
- Decipifus algoensis (Thiele, 1925)

Synonyms
- Glyptanachis algoensis (Thiele, 1925); Thesbia algoensis Thiele, 1925 (original combination)

Species of gastropod

Decipifus algoensis is a species of sea snail, a marine gastropod mollusk in the family Columbellidae.

== Distribution ==
This marine species occurs off Algoa Bay, South Africa
