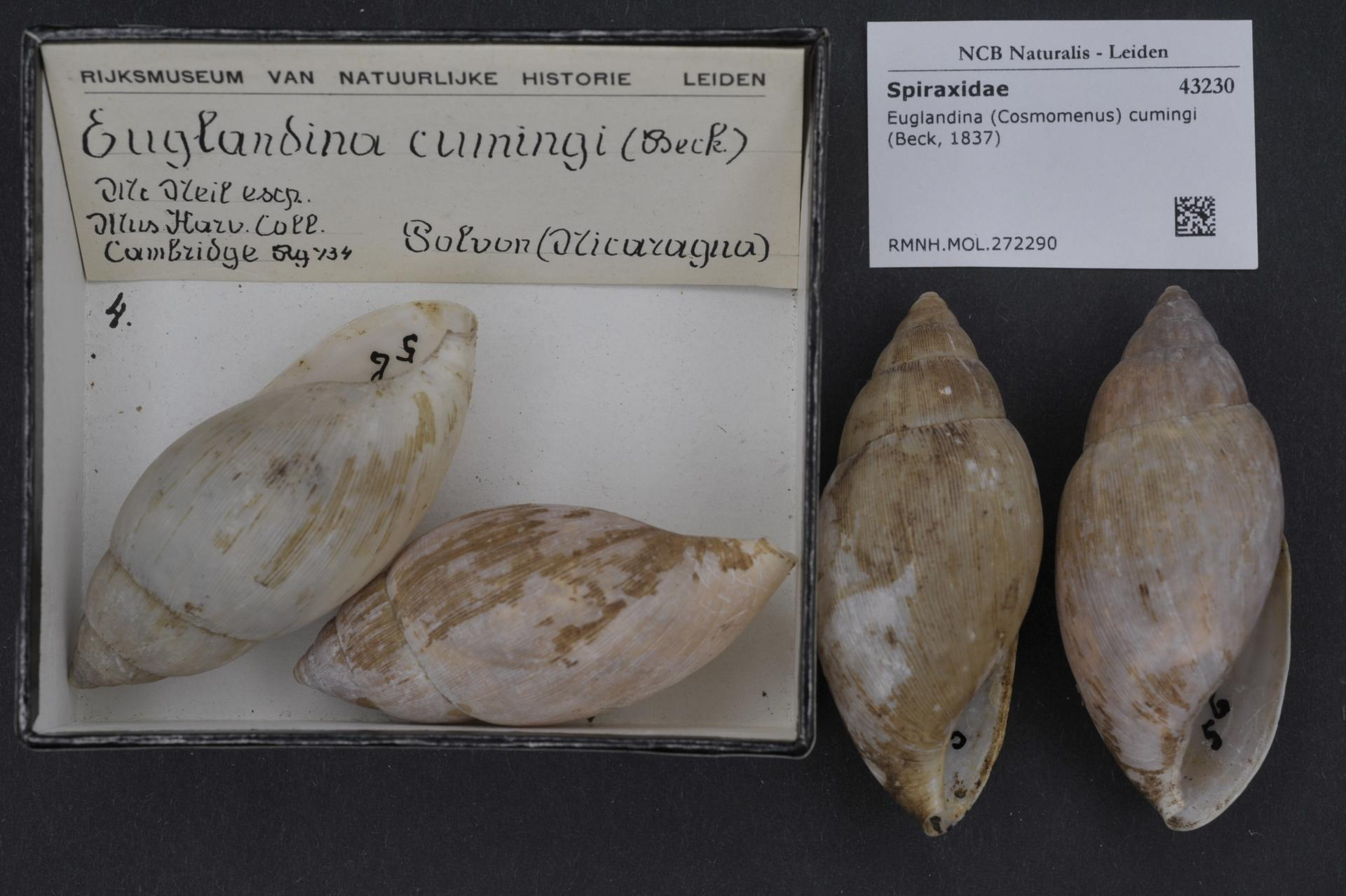
- Euglandina (Cosmomenus) cumingi shells

Scientific classification
- Kingdom: Animalia
- Phylum: Mollusca
- Class: Gastropoda
- Order: Stylommatophora
- Family: Spiraxidae
- Genus: Euglandina
- Species: E. cumingi

Binomial name
- Euglandina cumingi (Beck, 1827)

= Euglandina cumingi =

Species of gastropod

Euglandina cumingi is a species of predatory air-breathing land snail, a terrestrial pulmonate gastropod mollusk in the family Spiraxidae.
