= Pleurotomella innocentia =

Scientific classification
- Kingdom: Animalia
- Phylum: Mollusca
- Class: Gastropoda
- Subclass: Caenogastropoda
- Order: Neogastropoda
- Superfamily: Conoidea
- Family: Raphitomidae
- Genus: Pleurotomella
- Species: P. innocentia

Binomial name
- Pleurotomella innocentia (Strebel, 1905)

Synonyms
- Falsimohnia minor Strebel, 1908; Pleurotomella (Anomalotomella) innocentia (Dell, 1990)· accepted, alternate representation; Thesbia filostriata Strebel, 1905; Typhlodaphne innocentia Dell, 1990 (original combination)

Species of gastropod

Pleurotomella innocentia is a species of sea snail, a marine gastropod mollusk in the family Raphitomidae.

This species is considered by Kantor, Yuri I., and M. G. Harasewych (2013) as a synonym of Falsimohnia minor Strebel, 1908.

== Description ==
The length of the shell attains 4 mm. The shell is spiraled and generally a brownish or white color. It is pointed at the top.

== Distribution ==
This marine species occurs off South Georgia Island and off Port Alfred, Rep. South Africa, and in the Ross Sea, Antarctica
