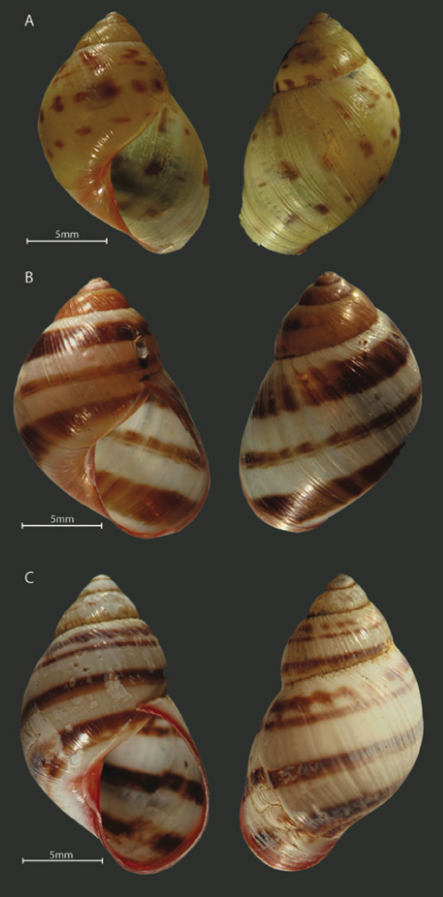
- Drymaeus tripictus

Scientific classification
- Kingdom: Animalia
- Phylum: Mollusca
- Class: Gastropoda
- Order: Stylommatophora
- Family: Bulimulidae
- Genus: Drymaeus
- Species: D. tripictus

Binomial name
- Drymaeus tripictus Albers, 1857

Synonyms
- Bulimulus rhodotrema Martens, 1868 (junior synonym); Bulimus tripictus Albers, 1857 (original combination); Drymaeus (Mesembrinus) tripictus (Albers, 1857)· accepted, alternate representation

= Drymaeus tripictus =

Species of gastropod

Drymaeus tripictus is a species of air-breathing land snail, a terrestrial pulmonate gastropod mollusc in the family Bulimulidae.

Specimens vary in color patterns, but can be identified by their ventricose shape, broad bands of spots and an apex and peristome of bright rose coloration. Some specimens have white or translucent dots on the body whorl.

== Similar species ==
The reproductive system of D. tripictus, and Drymaeus costarricenses are similar, suggesting these species are closely related. Two other species - Drymaeus irazuensis and Drymaeus gabbi - also have bright rose coloured peristomes, but there is no description of their reproductive apparatus in the scientific literature, therefore the taxonomic relationship is not certain yet.

== Distribution ==
D. tripictus is an extremely rare land snail species. This snail is endemic to the central Costa Rican highlands between an altitude of 1300-1700 m.

== Ecology ==
These snails are more active during the night and until early morning. D. tripictus likely feed on algae and cyanobacteria present on moss or lichen. They can be found in the shrubs and understory of the forest. The species is more abundant in the primary forest (0.017 individuals/m^{2}) than in secondary forests (0.001 individuals/m^{2}).

== Reproduction ==
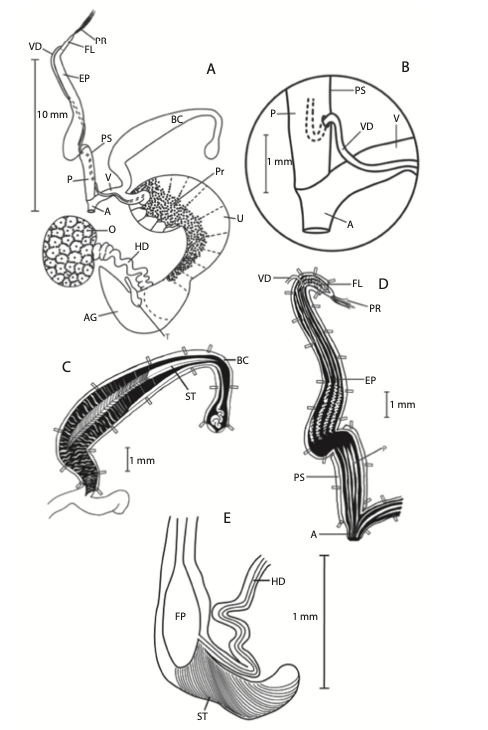
Drymaeus tripictus reproductive system

As all other members of this family, D. tripictus has an hermaphrodite reproductive system, meaning one specimen has both male and female genitalia.

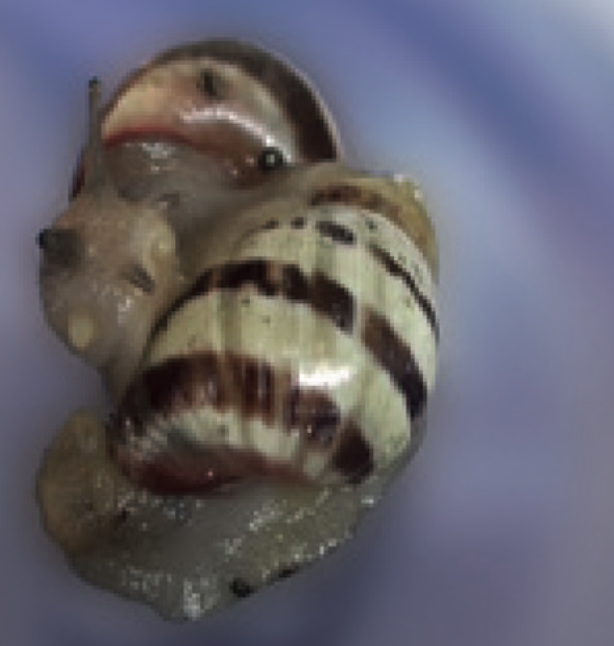
Mating process of Drymaeus tripictus (Source: Zaidett Barrientos)

The mating process is by shell mounting, where the male acting individual slides on top of the female acting individual, followed by multiple stimulatory activity, where the radula of the male acting individual scrapes the shell and the mantle collar of the female acting individual. Finally the male acting individual turns its head, allowing contact between the gonopores, but the phallus is not everted. This process takes between 60-75 minutes and no role switching takes place. Hatching occurs between June and July. This is the only description available for a species of the genus Dryameus.
