= Euglandina aurata =

Scientific classification
- Kingdom: Animalia
- Phylum: Mollusca
- Class: Gastropoda
- Order: Stylommatophora
- Family: Spiraxidae
- Genus: Euglandina
- Species: E. aurata

Binomial name
- Euglandina aurata (Morelet, 1849)

Species of gastropod

Euglandina aurata is a species of large predatory air-breathing land snail, a terrestrial pulmonate gastropod mollusk in the family Spiraxidae.

Euglandina aurata is the type species of the genus Euglandina.
