= Hermann Strebel =

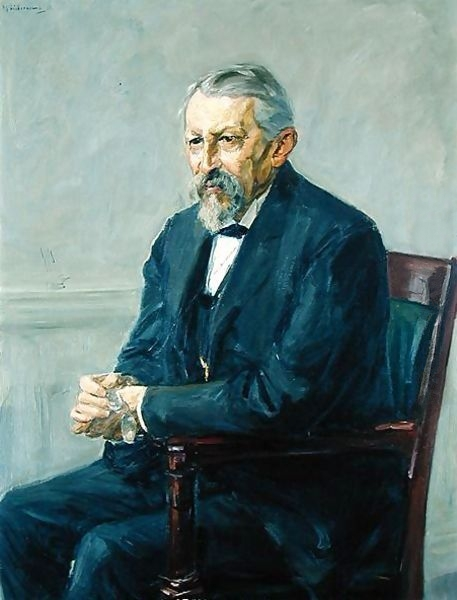
1905 painting of portrait of Hermann Strebel by Max Liebermann.

Hermann Wilhelm Strebel ( Hamburg, 1 January 1834 – Hamburg, 6 November 1914) was a merchant, ethnologue and a malacologist from Germany and Mexico.

== Biography ==
He was born on 1 January 1834 in Hamburg as the youngest of four brothers. Through his school teacher he became interested in the study of snails and their shells On 13 August 1848, he left for Veracruz in Mexico. Under the supervision of his eldest brother he became an apprentice in a factory. He would stay in Mexico for the next twenty years. He survived a shipwreck off the coast of Yucatán. Between 1852 and 1867 he worked as a merchant for German exporters of manufactured goods. During this time he began under the guidance of his friend Carl Hermann Berendt collecting shells of native snails, which would constitute the basis of his collection. At this time, he began a lively exchange with German and American malacologists. He was also introduced by Berendt to zoology and archeology

In 1860 he married Inés Mahn, a merchant's daughter, born in Mexico. In 1861, his first son Richard Strebel was born. In 1867 the family, now consisting of five members, moved to Hamburg. Between 1867 and 1899 Strebel led his business in foreign lumber. During this time he began to exercise his scientific researches with all the activity of his nature. At first he turned his attention to working out his zoological collections. Through contact with other German malacologists he published from 1873 to 1882 his first scientific papers on the Mexican land and freshwater molluscs. His book on the fauna of Mexico was published in 1882, after six years' work and was acclaimed as one of the best and most detailed faunistic monographs of the subject. It provided him the respect of all contemporary authorities as a great scholar.

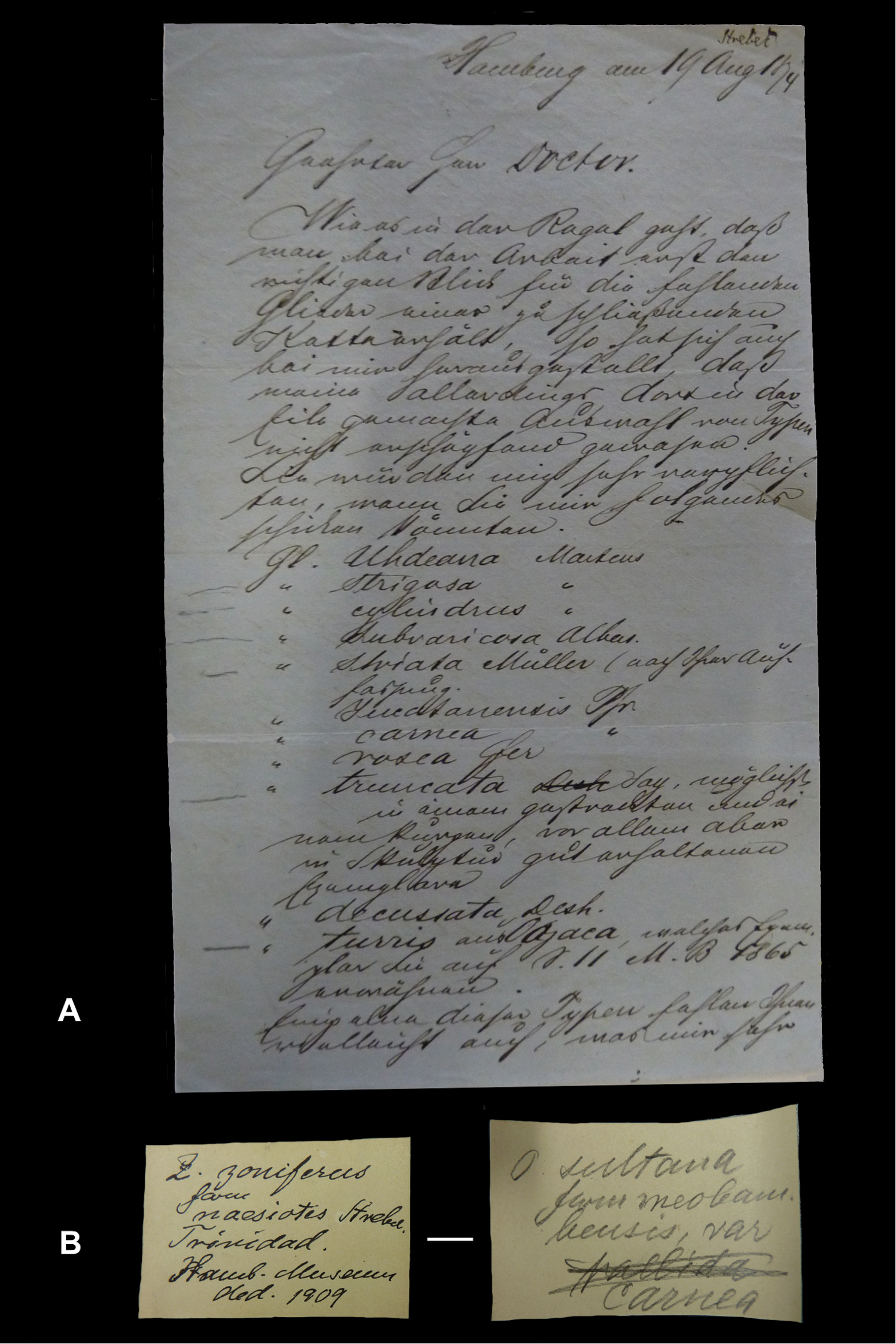
Excerpt from letter of H. Strebel, d.d. Hamburg, 22.May.1877 and labels in Strebel's handwriting, ca. 1908

After the publication of this book, he turned his attention to Mexican archeology. He asked a befriended family in Mexico to perform archaeological excavations at various locations The results became his scientific collection in Hamburg. To finance further excavation activities, he sold some excavation finds to the Museum of Ethnology in Berlin, the Hamburg Senate and to the city of Leipzig. His writings on this subject are comprised in ten treatises, of which two volumes on Old Mexico and some more recent studies of ornaments and earthen vessels.

From 1899 on, he worked scientifically at the malacology department of the Natural History Museum, Hamburg.

Hermann Strebel received in 1906 the Loubat Prize of the Royal Prussian Academy of Sciences, Berlin. In 1904, he was honored with an honorary doctorate of philosophy from the University of Giessen. He also received diplomas and congratulations from a large number of learned societies from Germany and abroad. In 1914 he was promoted to professor by the Senate of the Free and Hanseatic city of Hamburg.

Hermann Strebel died on November 6, 1914, in Hamburg.

The World Register of Marine Species contains a species named by Strebel: Bela notophila Strebel, 1908 that has become a synonym of Strebela notophila (Strebel, 1908) and also contains 26 records of marine species with the epithet "strebeli".

The gastropod genus Strebela Kantor & Harasewych, 2013 was named after him.
