= List of non-marine molluscs of Mexico =

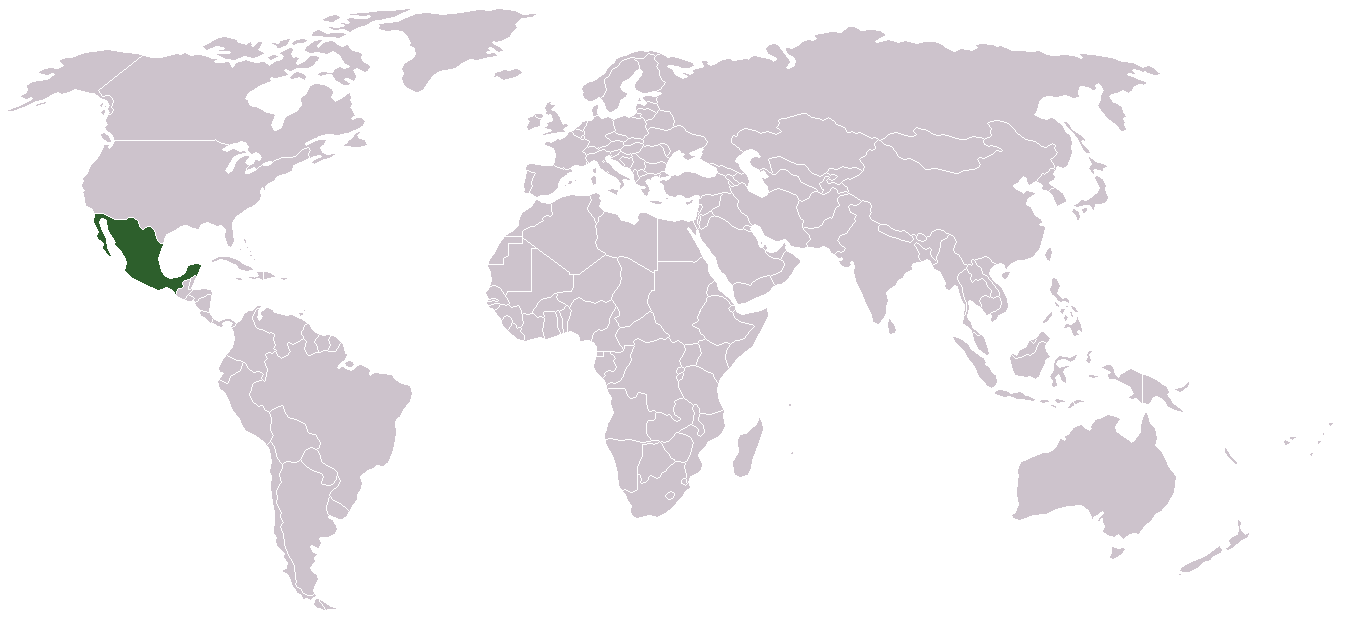
Location of Mexico

The non-marine molluscs of Mexico are a part of the molluscan wildlife of Mexico. A number of species of non-marine molluscs are found in the wild in Mexico.

There are about 1,178 species and subspecies of terrestrial gastropods in the Mexico.

Summary table of number of species:
Numbers of molluscs by habitat	Number of species
Freshwater gastropods	?
Land gastropods	1,178 species and subspecies
Total number of non-marine gastropods	over 1200
Freshwater bivalves	?
Total number of non-marine molluscs	?

There are not enough records of terrestrial gastropods from states of Aguascalientes and Tlaxcala.

== Freshwater gastropods ==
Neritidae

- Clypeolum latissimum (Broderip, 1833)
- Neritina virginea (Linnaeus, 1758)
- Vitta clenchi (Russell, 1940)
- Vitta usnea (Röding, 1798)

Ampullariidae

- Pomacea cerasum (Hanley, 1854)
- Pomacea flagellata (Say, 1829)
- Pomacea cumingii (King & Broderip, 1831)
- Pomacea catemacensis (H. B. Baker 1922)
- Pomacea picta (Reeve, 1856)

Viviparidae

- Viviparus inornatus (Binney, 1865)

Pachychilidae

- Amnipila pila (Pilsbry & Hinkley, 1910)
- Pachychilus apheles F. G. Thompson, 1967
- Pachychilus apis (I. Lea & H.C. Lea, 1851)
- Pachychilus atratus Pilsbry & Hinkley, 1910
- Pachychilus chrysalis (Brot, 1872)
- Pachychilus corpulentus F. G. Thompson, 1967
- Pachychilus corvinus (Morelet, 1849)
- Pachychilus dalli Pilsbry, 1896
- Pachychilus glaphyrus (Morelet, 1849)
- Pachychilus graphium (Morelet, 1849)
- Pachychilus hellerii (Brot, 1862)
- Pachychilus humerosus Pilsbry & Hinkley, 1910
- Pachychilus indiorum (Morelet, 1849)
- Pachychilus largillierti (Philippi, 1843)
- Pachychilus larvatus (Brot, 1877)
- Pachychilus liebmanni (Philippi, 1848)
- Pachychilus moctezumensis (Pilsbry & Hinkley, 1910)
- Pachychilus pilsbryi von Martens, 1899
- Pachychilus pleurotoma Pilsbry & Hinkley, 1910
- Pachychilus pluristriatus (Say, 1831)
- Pachychilus potomarchus Pilsbry, 1892
- Pachychilus radix (Brot, 1872)
- Pachychilus rasconensis Thiele, 1928
- Pachychilus rubidus (Lea, 1856)
- Pachychilus saussurei (Brot, 1874)
- Pachychilus schiedeanus (Philippi, 1843)
- Pachychilus schumoi Pilsbry, 1931
- Pachychilus suturalis Pilsbry & Hinkley, 1910
- Pachychilus tristis Pilsbry & Hinkley, 1910
- Pachychilus turati (A. Villa & G. B. Villa, 1854)
- Pachychilus vallesensis Hinkley, 1907

Pleuroceridae

- Lithasiopsis crassus Thompson, 1959
- Lithasiopsis darnelli Thompson, 1959
- Lithasiopsis hinkleyi Pilsbry, 1910
- Lithasiopsis mexicanus Pilsbry, 1910

Assimineidae

- Angustassiminea californica (Tryon, 1865)
- Assiminea cienegensis Hershler, Liu & Lang, 2007

Cochliopidae

- Aroapyrgus alleei Morrison, 1946
- Aroapyrgus clenchi (Goodrich & Van der Schalie, 1937)
- Aroapyrgus guatemalensis (Fischer & Crosse, 1891)
- Aroapyrgus mexicanus (Pilsbry, 1910)
- Aroapyrgus orizabensis (Crosse & Fischer, 1891)
- Aroapyrgus pasionensis (Goodrich & Van der Schalie, 1937)
- Balconorbis sabinasense Czaja, Cardoza-Martínez & Estrada-Rodríguez, 2019
- Chorrobius crassilabrum Hershler, Liu & Landye, 2011
- Coahuilix hubbsi Taylor, 1966
- Coahuilix landyei Hershler, 1985
- Cochliopina compacta (Pilsbry, 1910)
- Cochliopina francesae (Goodrich & Van der Schalie, 1937)
- Cochliopina infundibulum (Martens, 1899)
- Cochliopina milleri Taylor, 1966
- Cochliopina picta (Pilsbry, 1910)
- Cochliopina riograndensis (Pilsbry & Ferriss, 1906)
- Emmericiella longa (Pilsbry, 1909)
- Emmericiella novimundi (Pilsbry, 1909)
- Eremopyrgus elegans Hershler, Liu & Landye, 2002
- Juturnia coahuilae (Taylor, 1966)
- Littoridina crosseana (Pilsbry, 1910)
- Littoridina orcutti (Pilsbry, 1928)
- Littoridinops monroensis (Frauenfeld, 1863)
- Littoridinops tampicoensis (Pilsbry & Hinkley, 1907)
- Littoridinops tenuipes (Couper, 1844)
- Mexicenotica xochii Grego, Angyal & Liévano-Beltrán, 2019
- Mexipyrgus carranzae Taylor, 1966
- Mexithauma quadripaludium Taylor, 1966
- Minckleyella balnearis Hershler, Liu & Landye, 2011
- Paludiscala caramba Taylor, 1966
- Phreatoceras taylori (Hershler & Longley, 1986)
- Pseudotryonia mica Hershler, Liu & Landye, 2011
- Pseudotryonia pasajae Hershler, Liu & Landye, 2011
- Pyrgophorus coronatus (Pfeiffer, 1840)
- Pyrgophorus cisterninus (Küster, 1852)
- Pyrgophorus spinosus (Call & Pilsbry, 1886)
- Pyrgophorus cenoticus Grego, Angyal & Beltrán, 2019
- Tepalcatia bakeri (Pilsbry, 1891)
- Tepalcatia polia (Thompson & Hershler, 1991)
- Tepalcatia tela Thompson & Hershler, 2002
- Texadina sphinctostoma (Abbott & Ladd, 1951)
- Tryonia allendae Hershler, Liu & Landye, 2011
- Tryonia angosturae Hershler, Liu & Landye, 2011
- Tryonia chuviscarae Hershler, Liu & Landye, 2011
- Tryonia contrerasi Hershler, Liu & Landye, 2011
- Tryonia dugesiana (Morrison, 1945)
- Tryonia hertleini (Drake, 1956)
- Tryonia imitator (Pilsbry, 1899)
- Tryonia julimesensis Hershler, Liu & Landye, 2011
- Tryonia mariae (Morrison, 1945)
- Tryonia minckleyi Hershler, Liu & Landye, 2011
- Tryonia molinae Hershler, Liu & Landye, 2011
- Tryonia ovata Hershler, Liu & Landye, 2011
- Tryonia peregrina Hershler, Liu & Landye, 2011
- Tryonia pilsbryi (Morrison, 1945)
- Tryonia porrecta (Mighels, 1845)
- Tryonia santarosae Hershler, Landye, Liu, De la Maza-Benignos, Ornelas & Carson, 2014
- Tryonia seemani (Frauenfeld, 1863)
- Tryonia shikueii Hershler, Landye, Liu, De la Maza-Benignos, Ornelas & Carson, 2014
- Tryonia taylori Hershler, Liu & Landye, 2011
- Tryonia zaragozae Hershler, Liu & Landye, 2011

Hydrobiidae

- Cincinnatia integra (Say, 1829)
- Ecrobia truncata (Vanatta, 1924)
- Pyrgulopsis acarinatus (Hershler, 1985)
- Pyrgulopsis bernardina (Taylor, 1987)
- Pyrgulopsis brandi (Drake, 1953)
- Pyrgulopsis californiensis (Gregg & Taylor, 1965)
- Pyrgulopsis cedrosensis (Pilsbry, 1927)
- Pyrgulopsis chihuahua (Pilsbry, 1928)
- Pyrgulopsis manantiali (Hershler, 1985)
- Pyrgulopsis minckleyi (Taylor, 1966)
- Pyrgulopsis palomasensis (Pilsbry, 1895)
- Pyrgulopsis patzcuarensis Pilsbry, 1891
- Pyrgulopsis thompsoni Hershler, 1988

Lithoglyphidae

- Phreatomascogos gregoi Czaja & Estrada-Rodríguez, 2019
- Pterides bisinulabris Pilsbry, 1909
- Pterides pterostoma Pilsbry, 1909
- Pterides rhabdus Pilsbry, 1909

Valvatidae

- Valvata beltrami Contreras-Arquieta, 1993
- Valvata humeralis Say, 1829

Lymnaeidae

- Galba bulimoides (Lea, 1841)
- Galba cubensis (Pfeiffer, 1839)
- Galba humilis (Say, 1822)
- Galba modicella (Say, 1825)
- Galba obrussa (Say, 1825)
- Galba viator (Orbigny, 1835)
- Ladislavella elodes (Say, 1821)
- Lymnaea stagnalis (Linnaeus, 1758)
- Pseudosuccinea columella (Say, 1817)

Physidae

- Amecanauta jaliscoensis Taylor, 2003
- Austrinauta elatus (Gould, 1853)
- Chiapaphysa grijalvae Taylor, 2003
- Mayabina bullula (Crosse & Fischer, 1882)
- Mayabina polita Taylor, 2003
- Mayabina spiculata (Morelet, 1849)
- Mayabina tapanensis (Crosse & Fischer, 1882)
- Mexinauta aurantia (Carpenter, 1857)
- Mexinauta impluviatus (Morelet, 1849)
- Mexinauta nitens (Philippi, 1841)
- Mexinauta princeps (Philippi, 1846)
- Physella acuta (Draparnaud, 1805)
- Physella boucardi (Crosse and Fischer, 1881)
- Physella gyrina (Say, 1821)
- Physella mexicana (Philippi, 1841)
- Physella patzcuarensis (Pilsbry, 1891)
- Physella solidissima (Pilsbry, 1920)
- Physella squalida (Morelet, 1851)
- Physella virgata (Gould, 1855)
- Ultraphysella sinaloae Taylor, 2003

Planorbidae

- Antillorbis aeruginosus (Morelet, 1851)
- Biomphalaria belizensis (Crosse & Fischer, 1878)
- Biomphalaria boucardianus (Preston, 1907)
- Biomphalaria gracilenta (Gould, 1855)
- Biomphalaria havanensis (Pfeiffer, 1839)
- Biomphalaria helophila (d'Orbigny, 1835)
- Biomphalaria orbicula (Morelet, 1849)
- Biomphalaria petenensis (Morelet, 1851)
- Biomphalaria retusus (Morelet, 1849)
- Biomphalaria subprona (Von Martens, 1899)
- Biomphalaria tepicensis (Von Martens, 1899)
- Drepanotrema anatinum (d'Orbigny, 1835)
- Drepanotrema cimex (Moricand, 1839)
- Drepanotrema cultratum (d'Orbigny, 1841)
- Drepanotrema depressissimum (Moricand, 1839)
- Drepanotrema kermatoides (d'Orbigny, 1835)
- Drepanotrema lucidum (Pfeiffer, 1839)
- Drepanotrema sumichrasti (Crosse & Fischer, 1879)
- Drepanotrema surinamense (Clessin, 1884)
- Ferrissia californica (Rowell, 1863)
- Ferrissia rivularis (Say, 1817)
- Gundlachia radiata (Guilding, 1828)
- Gyraulus circumstriatus (Tryon, 1866)
- Gyraulus deflectus (Say, 1824)
- Gyraulus parvus (Say, 1817)
- Hebetancylus excentricus (Morelet, 1851)
- Helisoma anceps (Menke, 1830)
- Laevapex papillaris (Von Martens, 1899)
- Laevapex sallei (Bourguignat, 1857)
- Menetus dilatatus (Gould, 1841)
- Micromenetus brogniartianus (Lea, 1842)
- Planorbella contrerasi (Pilsbry, 1920)
- Planorbella duryi (Wetherby, 1879)
- Planorbella foveale (Menke, 1830)
- Planorbella tenue (Dunker, 1850)
- Planorbella trivolvis (Say, 1817)
- Planorbula armigera (Say, 1821)

== Land gastropods ==
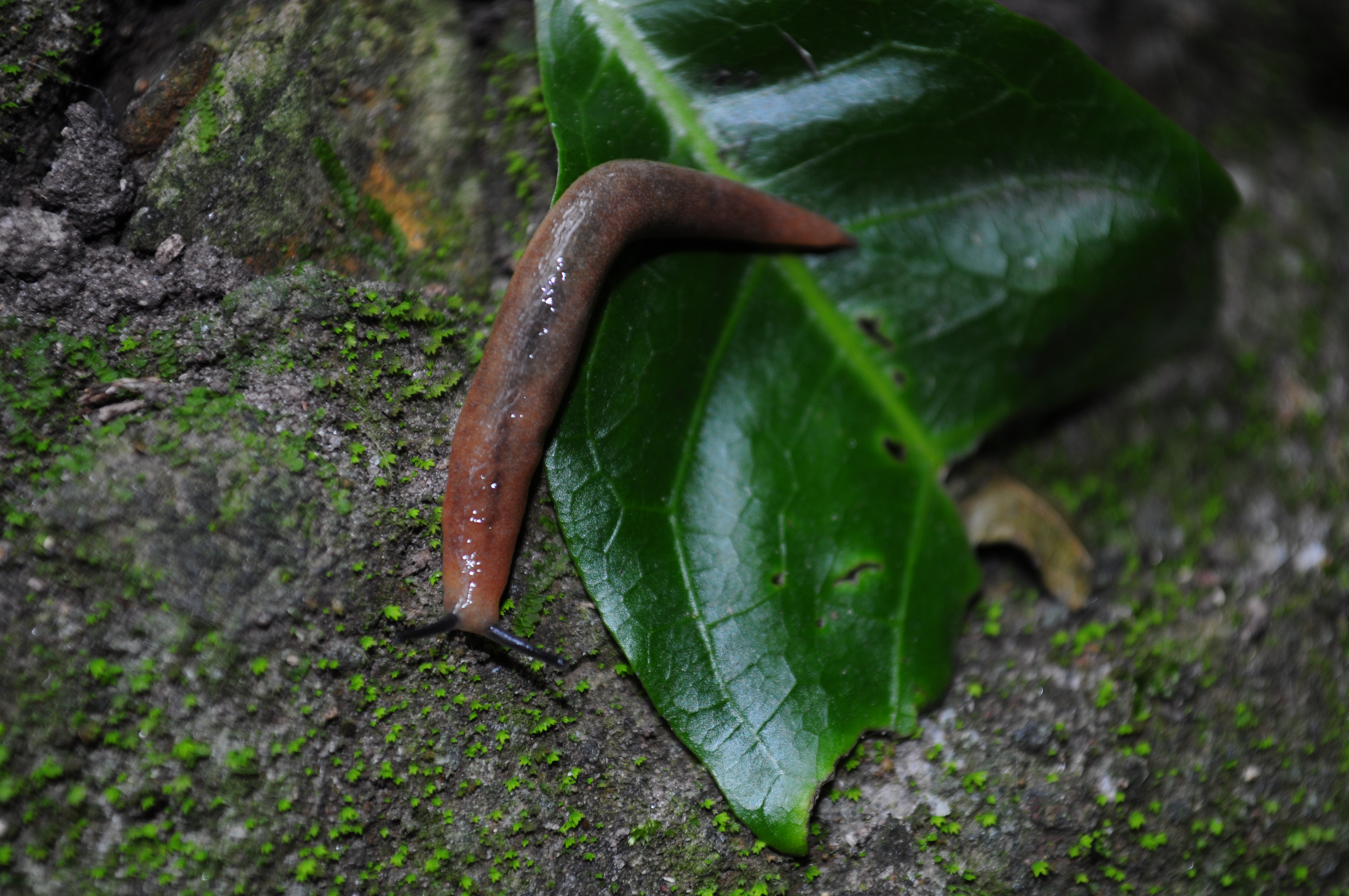
an unidentified slug from Mexico

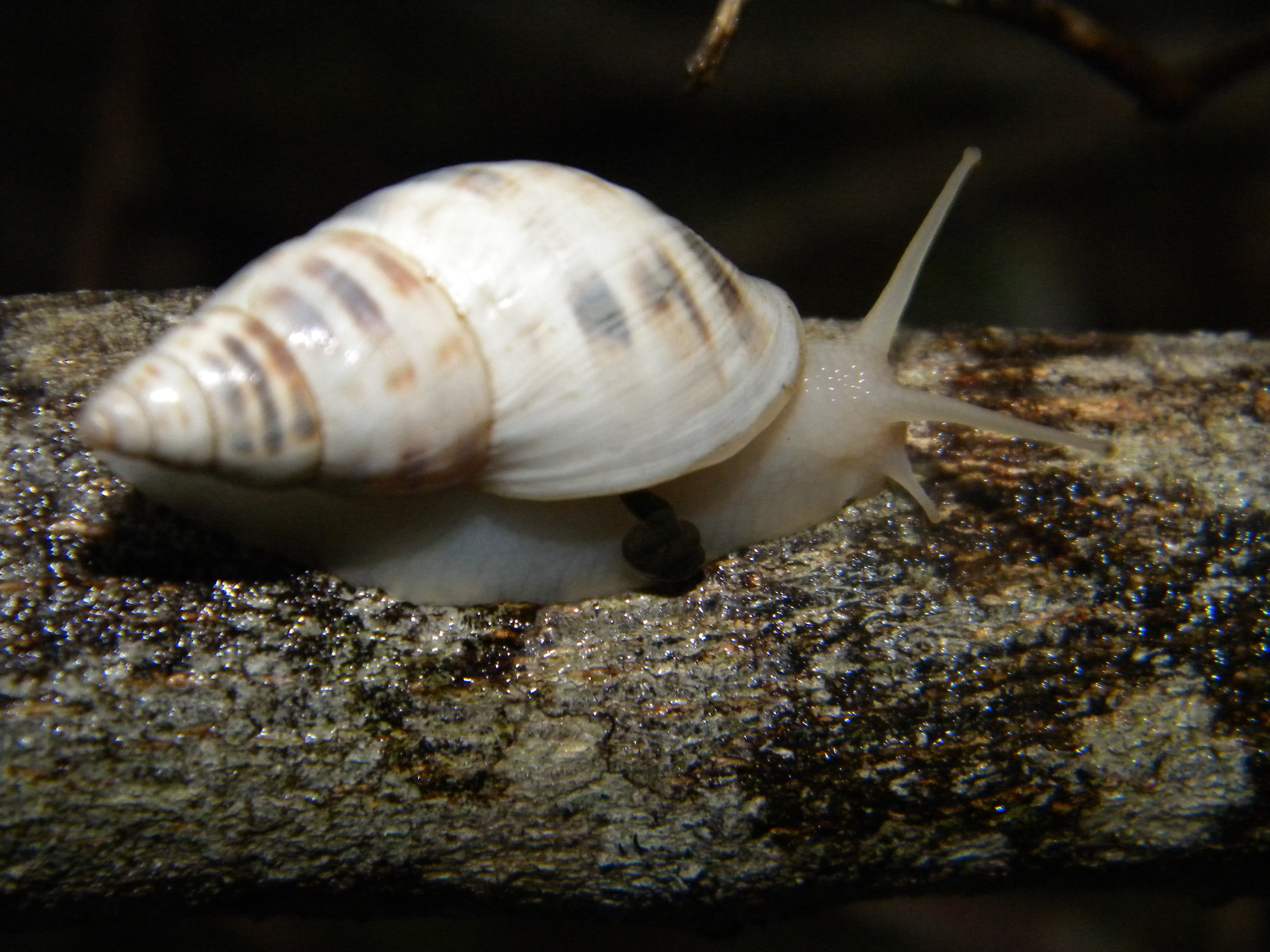
probably Drymaeus serperastrus from Mexico

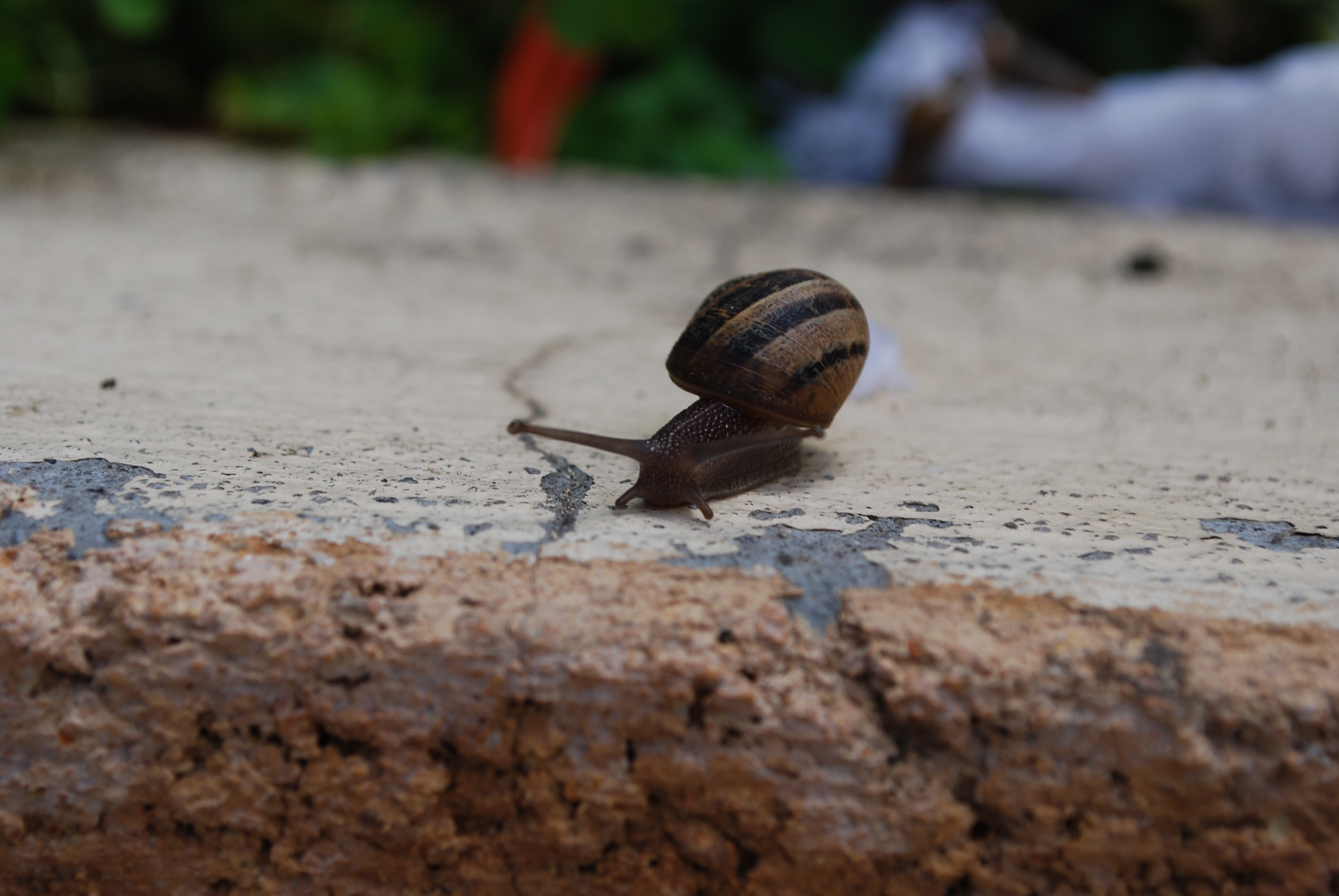
an unidentified land snail from Mexico

Helicinidae - 72 species

Veronicellidae

- Leidyula floridana (Leidy & Binney in Binney, 1851) - needs confirmation
- Leidyula moreleti (Fischer, 1871)
- Phyllocaulis gayi (Fischer, 1871) - needs confirmation
- Sarasinula dubia (Semper, 1885)
- Sarasinula plebeia (P. Fischer, 1868)

Subulinidae

- Allopeas gracile (Hutton, 1834)
- Allopeas micra (d’Orbigny, 1835)

Urocoptidae - 265 species

Spiraxidae - 246 species

Orthalicidae/Bulimulinae = Bulimulidae - 140 species

Agriolimacidae

- Deroceras laeve (Müller, 1774)
- Deroceras invadens Reise, Hutchinson, Schunack and Schlitt, 2011
- Deroceras reticulatum (Müller, 1774)

Pupillidae - 47 species

Polygyridae - 65 species

Xanthonychidae - 58 species

- Semiconchula custepecana Naranjo-García, Polaco & Pearce, 2000

Echinichidae

- Echinix granulata Thompson & Naranjo-García, 2012
- Echinix ochracea Thompson & Naranjo-García, 2012
- Echinix rugosa Thompson & Naranjo-García, 2012

Humboldtianidae - 49 species

== See also ==
Lists of molluscs of surrounding countries:

- List of non-marine molluscs of the United States
- List of non-marine molluscs of Guatemala
- List of non-marine molluscs of Belize
- List of non-marine molluscs of Cuba
