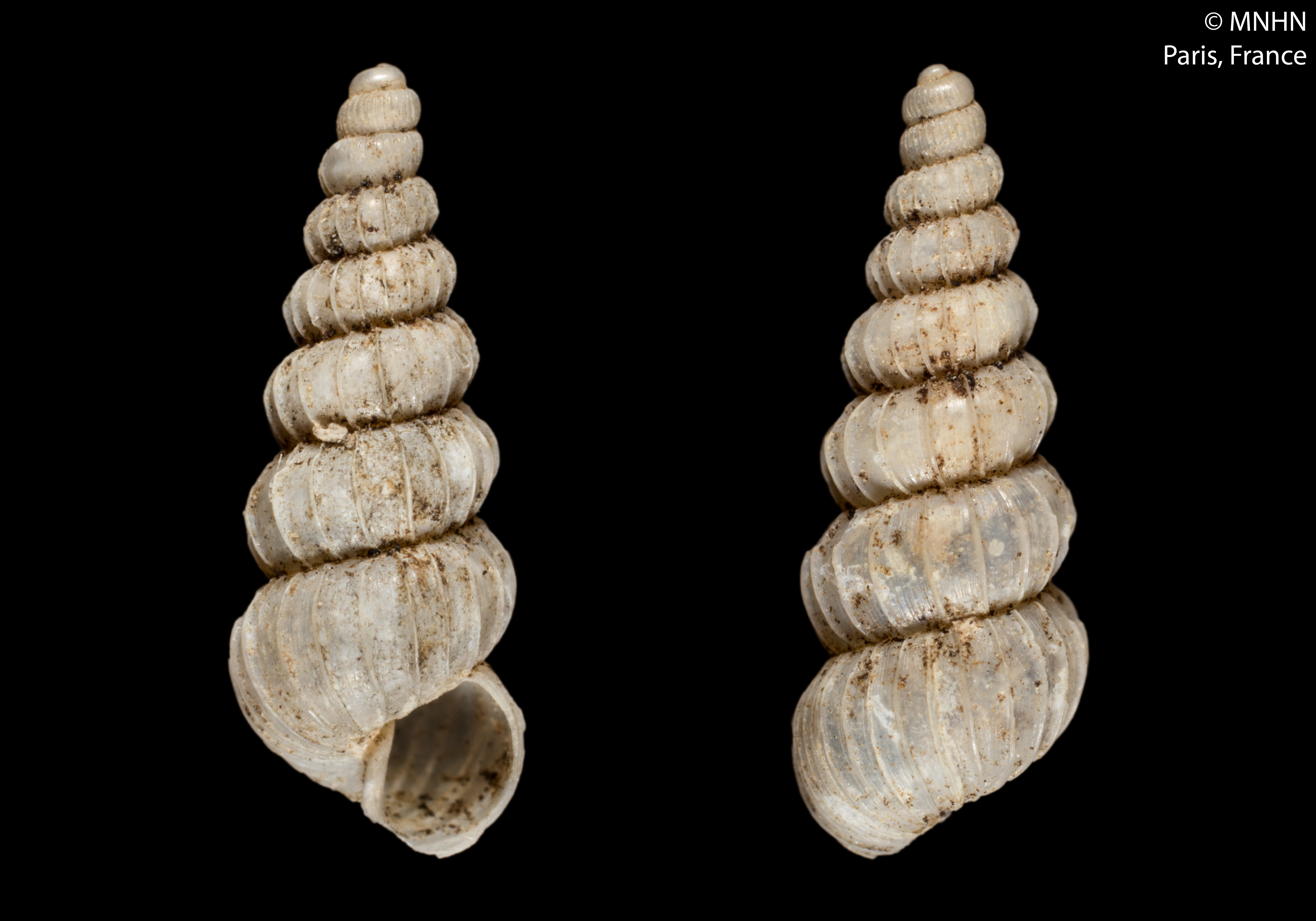
- Shell of Volutaxis scalariopsis (syntype at MNHN, Paris)

Scientific classification
- Kingdom: Animalia
- Phylum: Mollusca
- Class: Gastropoda
- Order: Stylommatophora
- Family: Spiraxidae
- Genus: Volutaxis; Strebel & Pfeffer, 1882

Diversity
- 28 species (in this list)

= Volutaxis =

Genus of gastropods

Volutaxis is a genus of predatory air-breathing land snails, terrestrial pulmonate gastropod mollusks in the family Spiraxidae.

== Distribution ==
The distribution of the genus Volutaxis includes Mexico, Central America, and the Greater Antilles.

== Species ==
There are three subgenera in the genus Volutaxis. Species in the genus Volutaxis include:

Subgenus Volutaxis Strebel & Pfeffer, 1882

- Volutaxis blandiana (Pilsbry, 1909)
- Volutaxis cacahuamilpensis (Herrera, 1891)
- Volutaxis confertecostatus Strebel, 1882
- Volutaxis delicatus (Pilsbry, 1907)
- Volutaxis eburneus Thompson, 2010
- Volutaxis fallax (H. B. Baker, 1940)
- Volutaxis linearis (Pfeiffer, 1866)
- Volutaxis livingstonensis (Pilsbry, 1920)
- Volutaxis longior (Pilsbry, 1920)
- Volutaxis maya Bequaert & Clench, 1931
- Volutaxis nitidus Strebel, 1882
- Volutaxis rhoadsi (Pilsbry, 1899)
- Volutaxis scalariopsis (Morelet, 1851)
- Volutaxis scalella (Von Martens, 1898)
- Volutaxis strebeli (Pilsbry, 1907)
- Volutaxis subulinus (H. B. Baker, 1940)
- Volutaxis sulciferus (Morelet, 1851)
- Volutaxis tenuecostatus Strebel, 1882
- Volutaxis tenuis (Pfeiffer, 1868)
- Volutaxis uruapamensis (Pilsbry, 1899)

Subgenus Mirapex Baker, 1939 include one species:

- Volutaxis enigmaticus (H. B. Baker, 1939)

Subgenus Versutaxis Baker, 1939

- Volutaxis arctatus (H. B. Baker, 1940)
- Volutaxis futilis (H. B. Baker, 1939)
- Volutaxis opeas (H. B. Baker, 1939)
- Volutaxis odiosus (Pilsbry, 1899)
- Volutaxis patzcuarensis (Pilsbry, 1899)
- Volutaxis subgranum (H. B. Baker, 1939)
- Volutaxis subopeas (H. B. Baker, 1939)

Volutaxis (Mirapex ?) acus (Shuttleworth, 1852) is nomen dubium.
