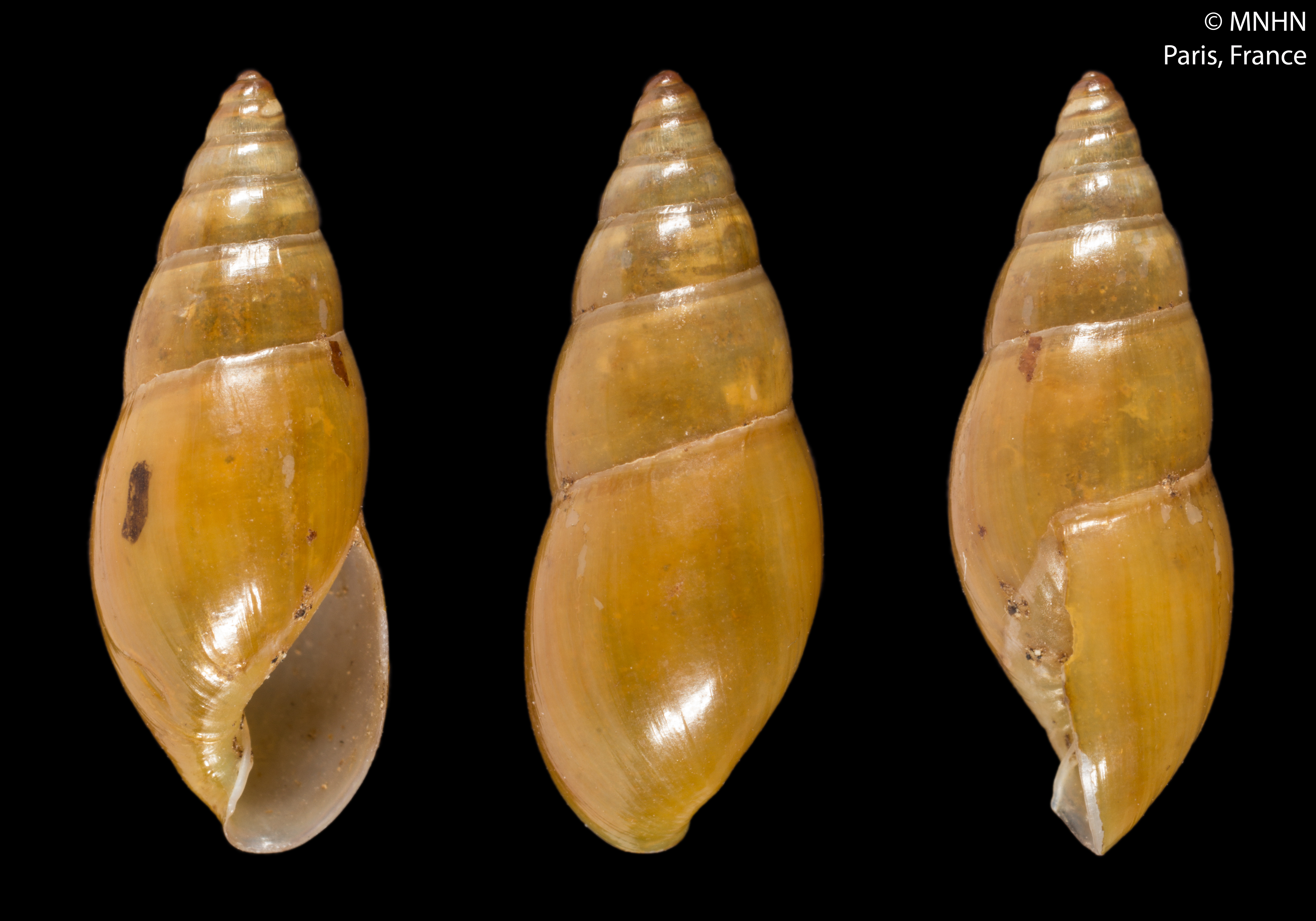
- Shell of Streptostyla sargi (lectotype at MNHN, Paris)

Scientific classification
- Kingdom: Animalia
- Phylum: Mollusca
- Class: Gastropoda
- Order: Stylommatophora
- Infraorder: Oleacinoidei
- Superfamily: Oleacinoidea
- Family: Spiraxidae
- Genus: Streptostyla; Shuttleworth, 1852

Type species
- Achatina streptostyla L. Pfeiffer, 1846

Synonyms
- Petenia Crosse & P. Fischer, 1868 (invalid; not Günther, 1862...); Spiraxis (Streptostyla) Shuttleworth, 1852 (original rank); Streptostpla [sic] misspelling; Streptostyla (Chersomitra) E. von Martens, 1860 · alternate representation; Streptostyla (Eustreptostyla) H. B. Baker, 1927 · alternate representation; Streptostyla (Peteniella) Pilsbry, 1907 · alternate representation; Streptostyla (Streptostyla) Shuttleworth, 1852 · alternate representation; Streptostylus Shuttleworth, 1852 misspelling

= Streptostyla =

Genus of gastropods

Streptostyla is a genus of predatory, air-breathing land snails, terrestrial pulmonate gastropod molluscs in the subfamily Streptostylinae of the family Spiraxidae.

Streptostyla is the type genus of the subfamily Streptostylinae.

== Distribution ==
The distribution of the genus Streptostyla includes Mexico, Central America, Cuba and Venezuela.

== Species ==
There are four subgenera in the genus Streptostyla. Species within the genus Streptostyla include:

Subgenus Streptostyla Shuttleworth, 1852

with oliviform shell

- Streptostyla clavatula Ancey, 1903
- Streptostyla cylindracea (Pfeiffer, 1846)
- Streptostyla gabbi Pilsbry, 1907
- Streptostyla irrigua (Shuttleworth, 1852)
- Streptostyla lattrei (Pfeiffer, 1845)
- Streptostyla novoleonis Pilsbry, 1899
- Streptostyla palmeri Dall, 1905
- Streptostyla potosiana Dall, 1905
- Streptostyla shuttleworthi (Pfeiffer, 1856)

with coniform shell

- Streptostyla conulus Von Martens, 1891
- Streptostyla gracilis Pilsbry, 1907
- Streptostyla streptostyla (Pfeiffer, 1846) - type species

with turgida shell

- Streptostyla chiriquiana Von Martens, 1901
- Streptostyla costaricensis Da Costa, 1904
- Streptostyla labida (Morelet, 1851)
- Streptostyla obesa Von Martens, 1891
- Streptostyla turgidula (Pfeiffer, 1856)
- Streptostyla nebulosa Dall, 1896
- Streptostyla sumichrasti Ancey, 1903
- Streptostyla vancegreenei Jacobson, 1966
- Streptostyla viridula Angas, 1879

with physaeform shell

- Streptostyla biconica Pfeiffer, 1856
- Streptostyla binneyana Crosse & Fischer 1869
- Streptostyla crassa Strebel, 1877
- Streptostyla delibuta (Morelet, 1851)
- Streptostyla flavescens (Shuttleworth, 1852)
- Streptostyla fulvida Crosse & Fischer, 1869
- Streptostyla glandiformis Crosse & Fischer, 1869
- Streptostyla oblonga (Pfeiffer, 1856)
- Streptostyla plicatula Strebel, 1977
- Streptostyla thomsoni Ancey, 1888
- Streptostyla valerioi Rehder, 1942
- Streptostyla ventricosula (Morelet, 1849)

with aplectiform shell

- Streptostyla boyeriana Crosse & Fischer, 1869
- Streptostyla dysoni (Pfeiffer, 1846)
- Streptostyla jacobsoni Pilsbry, 1951
- Streptostyla meridana (Morelet, 1849)
- Streptostyla propinqua Thompson, 1963
- Streptostyla sololensis Crosse & Fischer, 1869
- Streptostyla vexans Strebel, 1877

with subturrite shell

- Streptostyla mohriana (Pfeiffer, 1862)
- Streptostyla pilsbryi Richards, 1937
- Streptostyla sargi Crosse & Fischer, 1869

Subgenus Chersomitra Von Martens, 1860 includes six species:

- Streptostyla chiapensis Pilsbry, 1909
- Streptostyla limneiformis (Shuttleworth, 1852)
- Streptostyla lurida (Shuttleworth, 1852)
- Streptostyla mitraeformis (Shuttleworth, 1852)
- Streptostyla nigricans (Pfeiffer, 1845)
- Streptostyla physodes (Shuttleworth, 1852)

Subgenus Eustreptostyla H. B. Baker, 1927 includes five species:

- Streptostyla nicoleti (Shuttleworth, 1852)
- Streptostyla bartschi Dall, 1908
- Streptostyla jilitlana Dall, 1908
- Streptostyla toyuca Dall, 1908
- Streptostyla supracostata Pilsbry, 1910

Subgenus Peteniella Pilsbry, 1907 includes two species:

- Streptostyla catenata (Pfeiffer, 1856)
- Streptostyla ligulata (Morelet, 1849)

synonyms:

- Streptostyla bicolor E. von Martens, 1901: synonym of Pittieria bicolor (E. von Martens, 1901) (original combination)
- Streptostyla blandiana Crosse & P. Fischer, 1868: synonym of Streptostyla streptostyla coniformis (Shuttleworth, 1852)
- Streptostyla bocourti Crosse & P. Fischer, 1868: synonym of Streptostyla lurida (Shuttleworth, 1852)
- Streptostyla botteriana Crosse & P. Fischer, 1869: synonym of Streptostylella botteriana (Crosse & P. Fischer, 1869) (original combination)
- Streptostyla cingulata Crosse & P. Fischer, 1868: synonym of Streptostyla irrigua cingulata Crosse & P. Fischer, 1868 (original rank)
- Streptostyla cornea Crosse & P. Fischer, 1868: synonym of Streptostyla meridana cobanensis (Tristram, 1861)
- Streptostyla coxeni Richards, 1938: synonym of Myxastyla coxeni (Richards, 1938) (original combination)
- Streptostyla edwardsiana Crosse & P. Fischer, 1868: synonym of Streptostyla lattrei edwardsiana Crosse & P. Fischer, 1868 (original rank)
- Streptostyla flavescens S. I. da Costa, 1900: synonym of Streptostyla chiriquiana E. von Martens, 1901 (junior secondary homonym; S. chiriquiana is a replacement name)
- Streptostyla sallei Crosse & P. Fischer, 1868: synonym of Streptostyla lattrei sallei Crosse & P. Fischer, 1868 (original rank)
- Streptostyla sumichrasti Dautzenberg, 1908: synonym of Streptostyla sumichrasti Ancey, 1903 (homonym and synonym)
- Streptostyla tabiensis Pilsbry, 1891: synonym of Orizosoma tabiensis (Pilsbry, 1891) (unaccepted combination)
- Streptostyla wani Jaconson, 1968 is a synonym for Euglandina wani (Jacobson, 1968)
