= Rectaxis =

Scientific classification
- Kingdom: Animalia
- Phylum: Mollusca
- Class: Gastropoda
- Order: Stylommatophora
- Family: Spiraxidae
- Genus: Rectaxis; H. B. Baker, 1926

Genus of gastropods

Rectaxis is a genus of predatory air-breathing land snails, terrestrial pulmonate gastropod mollusks in the family Spiraxidae.

== Distribution ==
The distribution of the genus Rectaxis is an area that reaches from Venezuela to Mexico.

== Species ==
Species in the genus Rectaxis include:

- Rectaxis alvaradoi (Goodrich & van der Schalie, 1937)
- Rectaxis canalizonalis (Pilsbry, 1930)
- Rectaxis confertestriatus (Strebel, 1882)
- Rectaxis decussatus Baker, 1926 - type species
- Rectaxis funibus (Goodrich & van der Schalie, 1937)
- Rectaxis granum (H. B. Baker, 1939)
- Rectaxis intermedius (Strebel, 1882)
- Rectaxis pagodus Thompson, 2010
- Rectaxis paulisculpta (Rehder, 1942)
- Rectaxis pittieri (Von Martens, 1898)
- Rectaxis rhabdus (Pilsbry, 1907)
- Rectaxis subnitidus (H. B. Baker, 1939)
- Rectaxis subtilis (H. B. Baker, 1939)
