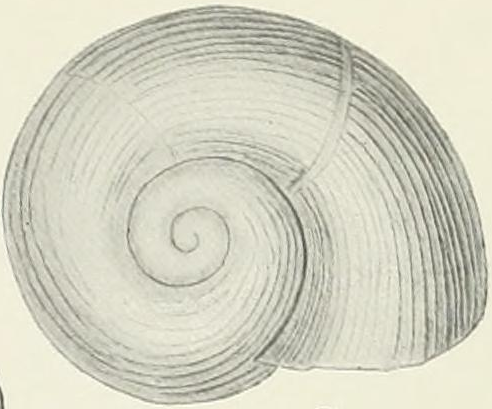
- Antillorbis aeruginosus

Scientific classification
- Kingdom: Animalia
- Phylum: Mollusca
- Class: Gastropoda
- Superorder: Hygrophila
- Family: Planorbidae
- Subfamily: Planorbinae
- Tribe: Drepanotrematini
- Genus: Antillorbis; Harry & Hubendick, 1964

= Antillorbis =

Genus of freshwater snails

Antillorbis is a genus of freshwater gastropods belonging to the family Planorbidae. This genus is distributed throughout the tropics and subtropics of the Americas.

== Description ==
Antillorbis species are small, between 2.5–5 mm (0.098–0.197 in) in shell width. Both species have a slight sculpture consisting of fine, spiraling lines, though this is much more common in A. aeruginosus. The umbilicus is sunken, giving a concave appearance to the left and right side of the shell. The right side is less concave. Like the genus Drepanotrema, Antillorbis species have two flagella that attach to the base of the penis sheath.

Differences Between Species
	A. aeruginosus	A. nordestense
Sculpture	More prominent	Less prominent
Aperture	Rounder	Oval-shaped
Reproductive Tract	Longer	Shorter
Prostate Diverticules	More	Fewer

== Distribution ==
Antillorbis species are native to the Americas. A. aeruginosus can be found in North and Central America, while A. nordestensis may be found in South America.

== Species ==
The species in this genus are as follows:

- Antillorbis aeruginosus (Morelet, 1851)
- Antillorbis nordestensis (Lucena, 1954)
