= Guillarmodia =

Scientific classification
- Kingdom: Animalia
- Phylum: Mollusca
- Class: Gastropoda
- Order: Stylommatophora
- Family: Spiraxidae
- Subfamily: Euglandininae
- Genus: Guillarmodia; H. B. Baker, 1941

Diversity
- 41 species

Genus of gastropods

Guillarmodia (Proameria) albersi (Pfeiffer, 1854)

Guillarmodia is a genus of predatory air-breathing land snails, terrestrial pulmonate gastropod mollusks in the family Spiraxidae.

== Distribution ==
The distribution of the genus Guillarmodia includes Mexico and Costa Rica.

== Species ==
Species in the genus Guillarmodia include:

Subgenus Guillarmodia H. B. Baker, 1941 include 14 species:

- Guillarmodia arthritica (Thompson, 1995)
- Guillarmodia brachystyla (Thompson, 1995)
- Guillarmodia comma (Thompson, 1995)
- Guillarmodia cymatophora (Pilsbry, 1910)
- Guillarmodia dorsalis (Thompson, 1963)
- Guillarmodia elegans (Von Martens, 1895)
- Guillarmodia gracilior (Thompson, 1995)
- Guillarmodia kingi (Thompson, 1995)
- Guillarmodia mariana (Dall, 1926)
- Guillarmodia minuta (Pilsbry, 1910)
- Guillarmodia multispira (Pfeiffer, 1861)
- Guillarmodia nelsoni (Bartsch, 1909)
- Guillarmodia pupa (H. B. Baker, 1941) - type species
- Guillarmodia pygmaea (Pilsbry & Vanatta, 1936)
- Guillarmodia stenotrema (Thompson, 1995)

Subgenus Proameria H. B. Baker, 1941 includes 27 species:

- Guillarmodia albersi (Pfeiffer, 1854)
- Guillarmodia alticola (Pilsbry, 1903)
- Guillarmodia attenuata (Pfeiffer, 1851)
- Guillarmodia bellula (Crosse & Fischer, 1869)
- Guillarmodia chasonae Pilsbry & Cockerell, 1926
- Guillarmodia conferta (Pfeiffer, 1861)
- Guillarmodia cordovana (Pfeiffer, 1856)
- Guillarmodia dalli (Pilsbry, 1899)
- Guillarmodia delicata Pilsbry, 1903
- Guillarmodia delicatula (Shuttleworth, 1852)
- Guillarmodia filosa (Pfeiffer, 1855)
- Guillarmodia fischeri (Von Martens, 1891)
- Guillarmodia mitriformis (Angas, 1879)
- Guillarmodia oblonga (Pfeiffer, 1866)
- Guillarmodia orizabae (Pfeiffer, 1856)
- Guillarmodia polita (Strebel, 1975)
- Guillarmodia potosiana Pilsbry, 1908
- Guillarmodia pulcherrima (Strebel, 1883)
- Guillarmodia rhoadsi (Pilsbry, 1899)
- Guillarmodia saxitilis H. B. Baker, 1941
- Guillarmodia sayula (Von Martens, 1891)
- Guillarmodia speciosa (Pfeiffer, 1856)
- Guillarmodia sulcifera (Von Martens, 1891)
- Guillarmodia tepicensis Pilsbry & Cockerell, 1926
- Guillarmodia tortillana (Pfeiffer, 1846)
- Guillarmodia turgida (Pfeiffer, 1861)
- Guillarmodia victoriana (Pilsbry, 1903)
