= Varicoglandina =

Scientific classification
- Kingdom: Animalia
- Phylum: Mollusca
- Class: Gastropoda
- Order: Stylommatophora
- Family: Spiraxidae
- Subfamily: Euglandininae
- Genus: Varicoglandina; Pilsbry, 1908

Diversity
- 5 species

Genus of gastropods

Varicoglandina is a genus of predatory air-breathing land snails, terrestrial pulmonate gastropod mollusks in the family Spiraxidae.

== Distribution ==
The distribution of the genus Varicoglandina includes Mexico and Guatemala.

== Species ==
There are five species in the genus Varicoglandina:

- Varicoglandina constricta (Thompson, 1995)
- Varicoglandina monilifera (Pfeiffer, 1845)
  - Varicoglandina monilifera rubella (Morelet, 1849)
- Varicoglandina nana (Shuttleworth, 1852)
- Varicoglandina rubiginosa (Thompson, 1995)
- Varicoglandina stigmatica (Shuttleworth, 1852)
