= Varicoturris =

Scientific classification
- Kingdom: Animalia
- Phylum: Mollusca
- Class: Gastropoda
- Order: Stylommatophora
- Family: Spiraxidae
- Subfamily: Euglandininae
- Genus: Varicoturris; Pilsbry, 1907

Diversity
- 5 species

Genus of gastropods

Varicoturris is a genus of predatory air-breathing land snails, terrestrial pulmonate gastropod mollusks in the family Spiraxidae.

== Distribution ==
The distribution of the genus Varicoturris includes Mexico and Guatemala.

== Species ==
There are five species within two subgenera in the genus Varicoturris:

Subgenus Vericoturris Pilsbry, 1907

- Varicoturris dubia (Pfeiffer, 1856)
- Varicoturris flammulata (H. B. Baker, 1941)
- Varicoturris huehuetenangoensis (Thompson, 1995)
- Varicoturris pycnoptyx (Thompson, 1995)

Subgenus Streptostylella Pilsbry, 1908

- Varicoturris botteriana (Crosse & Fischer, 1869)
