= Spiraxis cingalensis =

Scientific classification
- Domain: Eukaryota
- Kingdom: Animalia
- Phylum: Mollusca
- Class: Gastropoda
- Order: Stylommatophora
- Family: Spiraxidae
- Genus: Spiraxis
- Species: S. cingalensis

Binomial name
- Spiraxis cingalensis (W. H. Benson, 1863)

Synonyms
- Digoniaxis cingalensis W. H. Benson, 1863

Species of terrestrial snails

Spiraxis cingalensis is a species of air-breathing land snails, a terrestrial pulmonate gastropod in the family Spiraxidae.

This is a taxon inquirendum.

== Description ==
The length of the shell attains 14 mm, its diameter 3 mm.

(Original description in Latin) The shell is narrowly perforate, subulate-turrite, slender, solid, polished, and finely striated, with numerous minute, closely spaced, wavy spiral striae crossing the surface. The spire is elongated, gradually tapering above, with an undetermined apex. The suture is barely impressed and irregular.

There are 11 remaining whorls (the apical ones are missing), which are flattened, with the body whorl rounded at the base. The aperture is slightly oblique and elliptical with a notch.

The peristome is straight and calloused internally at the upper angle. The right margin is arched above, the basal margin thickened, and the columellar margin calloused, slightly expanded, and somewhat reflexed. At its upper end, it is reinforced by a solid, oblique, spiral fold.

They were first described in 1863 by British malacologist William Henry Benson.

== Distribution ==
This species is endemic to Sri Lanka.
