= Mayaxis =

Scientific classification
- Kingdom: Animalia
- Phylum: Mollusca
- Class: Gastropoda
- Order: Stylommatophora
- Family: Spiraxidae
- Genus: Mayaxis; Thompson, 1995

Genus of gastropods

Mayaxis is a genus of predatory air-breathing land snails, terrestrial pulmonate gastropod mollusks in the family Spiraxidae.
