= Micromena =

Scientific classification
- Kingdom: Animalia
- Phylum: Mollusca
- Class: Gastropoda
- Order: Stylommatophora
- Family: Spiraxidae
- Genus: Micromena; H. B. Baker, 1939

Genus of gastropods

Micromena is a genus of predatory air-breathing land snails, terrestrial pulmonate gastropod mollusks in the family Spiraxidae.
