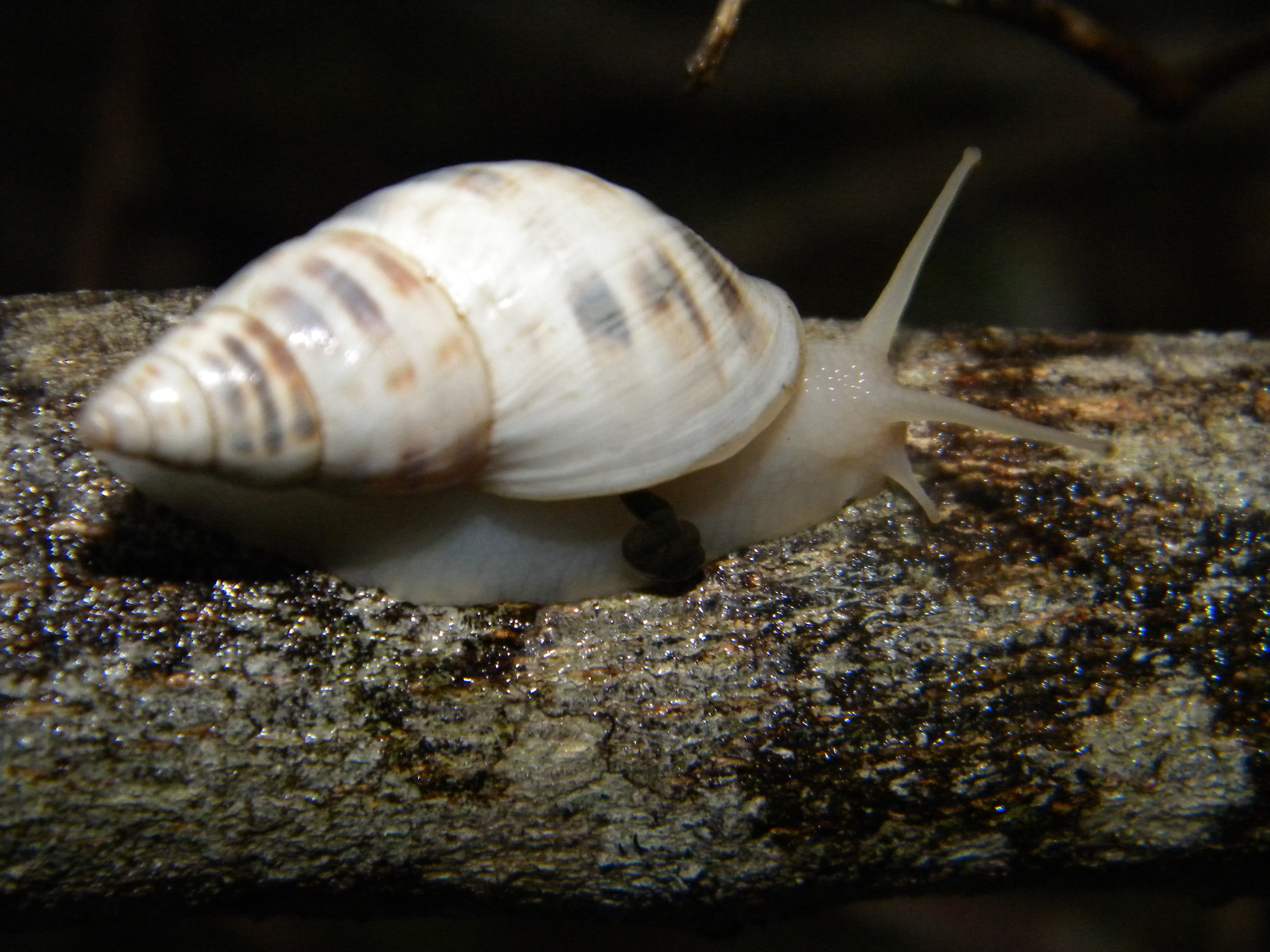
- Probably Drymaeus serperastrus from Uxmal, Yucatán, Mexico

Scientific classification
- Kingdom: Animalia
- Phylum: Mollusca
- Class: Gastropoda
- Order: Stylommatophora
- Family: Bulimulidae
- Genus: Drymaeus
- Species: D. serperastrus

Binomial name
- Drymaeus serperastrus (Say, 1829)

Synonyms
- Bulimus serperastrus Say, 1829; Bulimulus serperastrus (Say); Bulimulus serperastrus (Say); Bulimus liebmanni Pfeiffer, 1846; Bulimus paivanus Pfeiffer

= Drymaeus serperastrus =

Species of gastropod

Drymaeus serperastrus is a species of tropical air-breathing land snail, a pulmonate gastropod mollusk in the family Bulimulidae.

== Distribution ==
The distribution of Drymaeus serperastrus includes the following states of Mexico: Campeche, Quintana Roo, Yucatán, Veracruz, Hidalgo and Tamaulipas.

The type locality of Drymaeus serperastrus is "on the side of the road between Vera Cruz and the City of Mexico".

== Description ==
The radula of Drymaeus serperastrus has 127 rows of teeth. Formula of the radula is 79-1-70.
