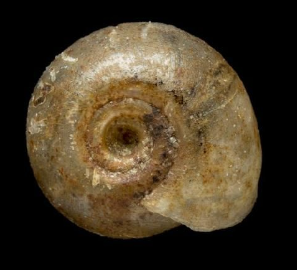

Scientific classification
- Kingdom: Animalia
- Phylum: Mollusca
- Class: Gastropoda
- Superorder: Hygrophila
- Family: Planorbidae
- Genus: Drepanotrema
- Species: D. anatinum

Binomial name
- Drepanotrema anatinum (d'Orbigny, 1835)

Synonyms
- List: Anisus (Gyraulus) lenzi van Benthem Jutting, 1943; junior synonym; Drepanotrema (Drepanotrema) anatinum (A. d'Orbigny, 1835); alternative representation; Guestieria shuttleworthi (L. Pfieffer, 1851); junior subjective synonym; Helix shuttleworthi L. Pfieffer, 1851; junior subjective synonym; Planorbis anatinus A. d'Orbigny, 1835; original combination; Planorbis aracacensis Clessin, 1884; junior subjective synonym; Planorbis aracasensis Gundlach, 1857; nomen nudum; Planorbis esperanzensis Tyron, 1866; junior subjective synonym; Planorbis haldemani C. B. Adams, 1849; junior subjective synonym; Planorbis isabel G. B. Sowerby II, 1877; junior subjective synonym; Planorbis nigellus Lutz, 1918; junior synonym; Planorbis yzabalensis Crosse & P. Fischer, 1879; junior synonym; Spirulina anatina (A. d'Orbigny, 1835; superseded combination

= Drepanotrema anatinum =

Species of mollusc

Drepanotrema anatinum is a species of freshwater gastropod belonging to the family Planorbidae. It is found in the neotropical region of the Americas.

== Taxonomy ==
Drepanotrema anatinum was originally described as Planorbis anatinus in 1835 by Alcide d'Orbigny. In 1933, Carlos G. Aguayo found many species of planorbids to be synonymous with D. anatinum, and revised the taxonomy. Synonymous taxa included Planorbis anatinus (A. d'Orbigny, 1835), Planorbis haldemani (C. B. Adams 1849), Planorbis esperanzensis (Tyron, 1866), Planorbis isabel (G. B. Sowerby II, 1877), Planorbis yzabalensis (Crosse & P. Fischer, 1879), and Planorbis aracacensis (Gundlach, 1857).

This species was the first to be listed under the genus Drepanotrema during the 1880 description of the then subgenus. Because this was a monotypic genus, it automatically became the type species, being a representative of the genus. The synonyms Helix shuttleworthi and Guestieria shuttleworthi were added in a 2024 revision.

== Description ==
=== Shell ===
Drepanotrema anatinum has a somewhat transparent golden brown shell, though it appears black when living. It may possess black stripes just inside the aperture or a yellow stripe across the front of the shell. The shell measures between 3.2 and 4 mm (0.13 and 0.16 in) in width and 1.5 to 1.8 mm (0.059 to 0.071 in) in height. At maximum, the shell may be 7 mm (0.28 in) in diameter. There are about 3–6 crescent-shaped whorls, with an average of 4.5. The last whorl is relatively wide. On the outside (periphery) of the shell, whorls may be rounded, keeled, or display intermediate characteristics. The aperture is also crescent-shaped, and is angled so that the right side of the lip sits lower on the body. There may be a microscopic sculpture consisting of tightly packed growth lines and small bumps, which is more prominent on the upper surface of the shell. The spire is sunken on both sides, but is shallower on the side held uppermost in life.

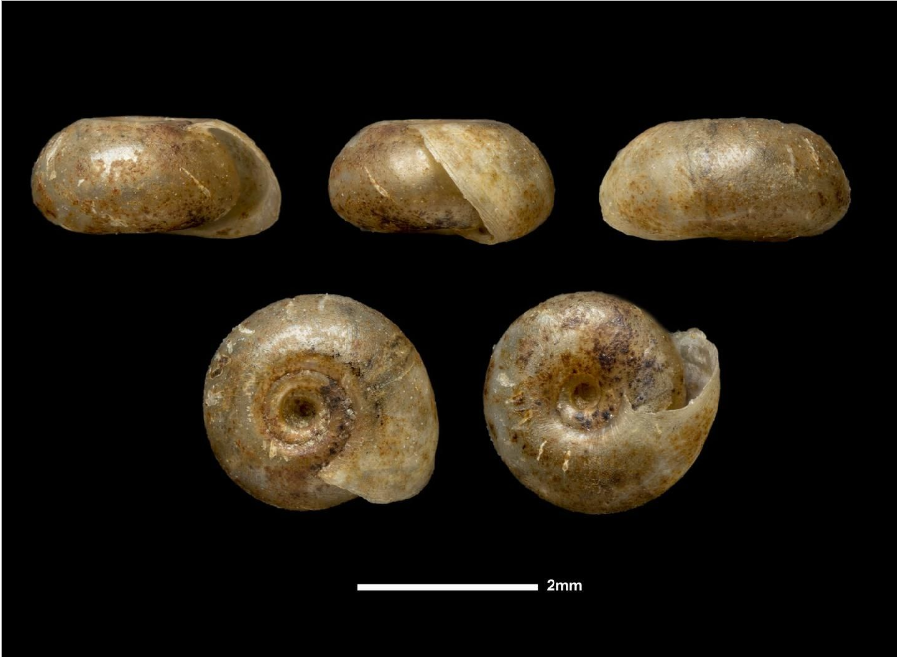
The shell of D. anatinum from multiple angles

It is somewhat similar to Drepanotrema lucidum, but both the mantle and shell are darker in coloration, the foot is shorter, rounder, and has black dots, the whorls expand more rapidly, and the black stripes on the cephalic tentacles are more prominent.

=== Reproductive tract ===
The ovotestis, an organ that produces both sperm and eggs, is a light golden color. It contains a prominent chamber (called an atrium) lined with hair-like cilia, which connects to a clear tube called the ovisperm duct. which The ovisperm duct carries both sperm and eggs to a carrefour, where the two are split. Before reaching the carrefour, the eggs and sperm pass through the white seminal vesicle and clear albumen gland. The prostate gland (associated with the male reproductive system) usually contains pocket-like structures called diverticula, which are important diagnostic characteristics within the family Planorbidae. However, in D. anatinum, these diverticula are poorly defined. Instead, the prostate of this species contains between 13 and 15 fingerlike projections.

The penis sheath, which houses the penis, joins with the preputium (a muscular organ that helps protrude the penis). In this species, the penis sheath is about 1.3 times as long as the preputium. The inner walls of the preputium are lined with hair-like structures called cilia, as well as large, droplet secreting cells. The penis (also called the verge) is longer than the penis sheath, and tapers down to a point. Like other Drepanotrema species, short flagella (long protrusions of the penis sheath) are present where the penis sheath meets the vas deferens. In this species, the flagella are unequal in size, with one being about twice as long as the other. Both flagella join the penis sheath, though almost intersect at their base. The bursa copulatrix, an organ that stores sperm, contains a relatively long duct.

=== Other characteristics ===
The radula (toothy tongue-like appendage) of D. anatinum has smaller teeth than Drepanotrema cultratum, but otherwise is very similar. The teeth are arranged in 37 columns and 158 rows. One central column of rachidian teeth is bordered by 18 combined columns of both lateral and marginal teeth on each side. There are black stripes on the underside of the foot (an organ used to move around), as well as on the sides of its body. There are also black markings in between the eyes that extend upwards. The cephalic tentacles (tentacles on the head) have a gray stripe down their center. The mantle cavity, an internal space housing the gills and other organs, does not have folds corresponding to the kidneys or digestive system.

== Distribution and habitat ==
Drepanotrema anatinum may be found across much of the neotropical region, including Cuba, Haiti, Panama, and Brazil. It is the second most common Drepanotrema species in Brazil, and is thought to be the smallest planorbid snail in Puerto Rico. It may be found in creeks, ponds, lakes, and lagoons, and is highly associated with the plant species Hydrocotyle ranunculoides and Pontederia crassipes.

== Ecology ==
Drepanotrema anatinum carries its shell parallel to the ground while moving. It may be found together with other snail species, including Stenophysa marmorata and Pseudosuccinea columella.

This species may carry the cercaria larvae of trematode parasites, including the blood fluke Cercaria marini. One study found that about 5% of all individuals collected in Rio de Janeiro were infected with trematodes in the family Echinostomatidae. Additionally, there is some evidence that this species carries trematodes in the genus Paramphistomum, which causes paramphistomiasis in ruminant mammals such as sheep and cows. It is not known to carry the human-infecting Schistosoma mansoni, which causes schistosomiasis.

== Reproduction ==
Drepanotrema anatinum lays egg sacs, usually with 4 embryos each. The egg sac has a diameter of about 2.5 mm (0.098 in). Once laid, the animal can reach sexual maturity in as little as 30 days. This species has bred in captivity under laboratory conditions.
