= Salasiella =

Scientific classification
- Kingdom: Animalia
- Phylum: Mollusca
- Class: Gastropoda
- Order: Stylommatophora
- Family: Spiraxidae
- Genus: Salasiella; Strebel, 1877

Genus of gastropods

Salasiella is a genus of predatory air-breathing land snails, terrestrial pulmonate gastropod mollusks in the family Spiraxidae.

== Species ==
Some species belonging to this genus are:

- Salasiella pulchella Pfr., 1856
