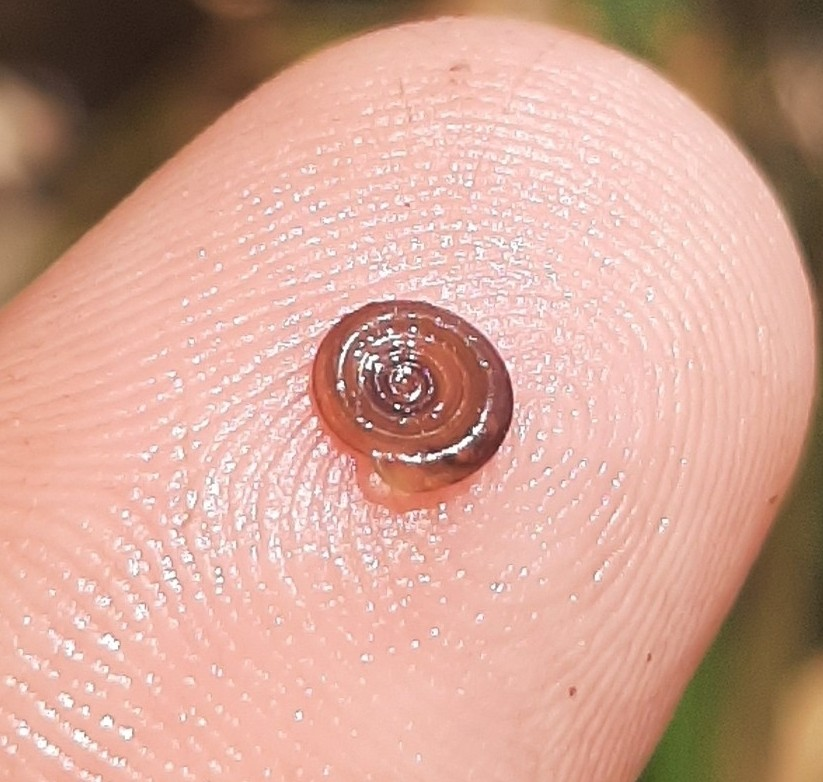
- Unidentified Drepanotrema sp.

Scientific classification
- Kingdom: Animalia
- Phylum: Mollusca
- Class: Gastropoda
- Superorder: Hygrophila
- Family: Planorbidae
- Subfamily: Planorbinae
- Tribe: Drepanotrematini
- Genus: Drepanotrema; Fischer & Crosse, 1880

Synonyms
- Drepanotrema (Drepanotrema) P. Fischer & Crosse, 1880; alternative representation; Drepanotrema (Fossulorbis) Pilsbry, 1934; alternative representation

= Drepanotrema =

Genus of gastropods

Drepanotrema is a genus of molluscs in the family Planorbidae. Two subgenera, Drepanotrema (Drepanotrema) Fischer & Crosse, 1880 and Drepanotrema (Fossulorbis) Pilsbry, 1934, have been eschewed in favour of the genus.

== Taxonomy ==
The species in this genus are as follows:

- Drepanotrema anatinum (A. d'Orbigny, 1835)
- Drepanotrema cimex (Moricand, 1838)
- Drepanotrema cultratum (A. d'Orbigny, 1841)
- Drepanotrema depressissimum (Moricand, 1839)
- Drepanotrema heloicum (A. d'Orbigny, 1835)
- Drepanotrema kermatoides (A. d'Orbigny, 1835)
- Drepanotrema limayanum (R. P. Lesson, 1831)
- Drepanotrema lucidum (L. Pfeiffer, 1839)
- Drepanotrema pfeifferi (Strobel, 1874)
- Drepanotrema sumichrasti (Crosse & P. Fischer, 1879)
- Drepanotrema surinamense (Clessin, 1884)

=== Taxon inquirendum ===
- Drepanotrema pileatum Paraense, 1971

=== Taxa brought into synonymy ===
- Drepanotrema aeruginosum P. Fischer & Crosse, 1880 represented as Antillorbis aeruginosus (Morelet, 1851)
- Drepanotrema chittyi Aguayo, 1935 represented as Drepanotrema cimex (Moricand, 1838)
- Drepanotrema hoffmani F. C. Baker, 1941 represented as Drepanotrema surinamense (Clessin, 1884)
- Drepanotrema nordestense (Lucena, 1954) represented as Antillorbis nordestensis (Lucena, 1954)
- Drepanotrema paropseides (A. d'Orbigny, 1935) represented as Drepanotrema limayanum R. P. Lesson, 1831
