= Spiraxis =

Scientific classification
- Kingdom: Animalia
- Phylum: Mollusca
- Class: Gastropoda
- Order: Stylommatophora
- Family: Spiraxidae
- Genus: Spiraxis; C. B. Adams, 1850

Genus of gastropods

Spiraxis is a genus of predatory air-breathing land snails, terrestrial pulmonate gastropod mollusks in the family Spiraxidae.

Spiraxis is the type genus of family Spiraxidae.

== Species ==
Some species belonging to this genus are:

- Spiraxis cingalensis Benson, 1863
- Spiraxis nitidus pittieri Martens, 1898
- Spiraxis paulisculpta Rehder, 1942
- Spiraxis scalella Martens, 1898
