= Pseudosubulina =

Scientific classification
- Kingdom: Animalia
- Phylum: Mollusca
- Class: Gastropoda
- Order: Stylommatophora
- Family: Spiraxidae
- Genus: Pseudosubulina; Strebel, 1882

Type species
- Achatina berendti Pfeiffer, 1862

Synonyms
- Spiraxis (Pseudosubulina) Strebel, 1882

Genus of gastropods

Pseudosubulina is a genus of predatory air-breathing land snails, terrestrial pulmonate gastropod mollusks in the family Spiraxidae.

== Species ==
This genus includes the following species:

- Pseudosubulina arcuata (Baker, 1939)
- Pseudosubulina berendti (Pfeiffer, 1862)
- Pseudosubulina borealis (Pilsbry, 1904)
- Pseudosubulina caduca (Baker, 1939)
- Pseudosubulina chaperi (Jousseaume, 1889)
- Pseudosubulina cheatumi Pilsbry, 1950
- Pseudosubulina costata (Baker, 1939)
- Pseudosubulina eiseniana (Cooper, 1893)
- Pseudosubulina evermanni Dall, 1926
- Pseudosubulina exilis (Pfeiffer, 1839)
- Pseudosubulina insularis Pilsbry, 1930
- Pseudosubulina irregularis Pilsbry, 1907
- Pseudosubulina juancho Dourson, Caldwell & Dourson, 2018
- Pseudosubulina nouraguensis Gargominy & Muratov, 2012
- Pseudosubulina orizabensis Pilsbry, 1907
- Pseudosubulina parva (Baker, 1939)
- Pseudosubulina robusta von Martens, 1898
- Pseudosubulina ruthae Pilsbry, 1954
- Pseudosubulina salvini von Martens, 1898
- Pseudosubulina santi Gargominy, 2025
- Pseudosubulina sargi (Crosse & Fischer, 1877)
- Pseudosubulina splendens (Thompson, 1959)
- Pseudosubulina tastensis (Cooper, 1894)
- Pseudosubulina texoloensis Pilsbry, 1899
- Pseudosubulina theoripkeni Gargominy & Muratov, 2012
- Pseudosubulina trypanodes (Pfeiffer, 1856)
- Pseudosubulina ventrosa (Baker, 1939)
