= Strebelia =

Scientific classification
- Kingdom: Animalia
- Phylum: Mollusca
- Class: Gastropoda
- Order: Stylommatophora
- Family: Spiraxidae
- Genus: Strebelia; Crosse & Fischer, 1868
- Species: S. berendti

Binomial name
- Strebelia berendti (L. Pfeiffer, 1861)

Synonyms
- Physella berendti L. Pfeiffer, 1861

Genus of gastropods

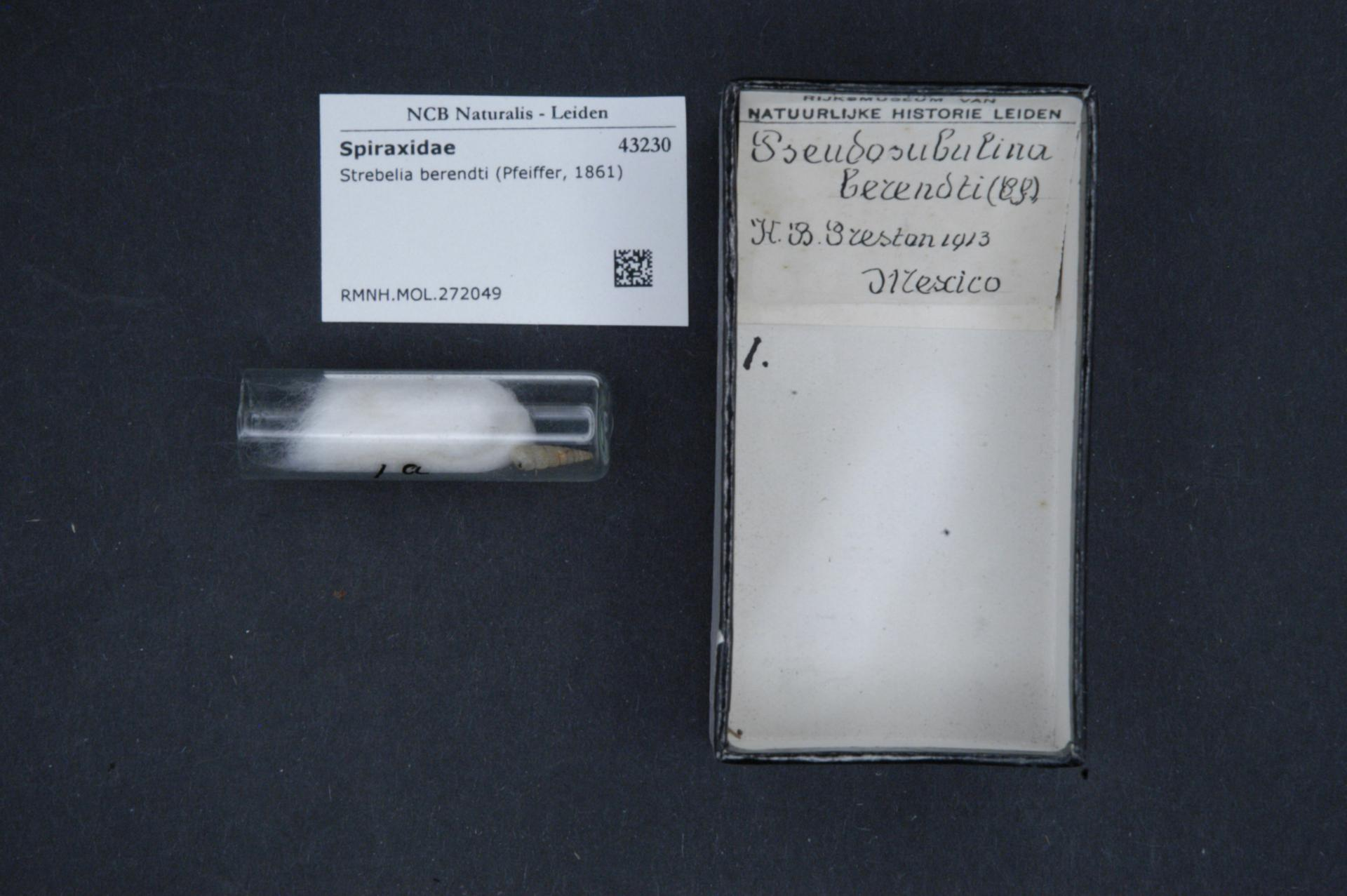
Strebelia berendti (Pfeiffer, 1861)

Strebelia is a genus of predatory air-breathing land snails, terrestrial pulmonate gastropod mollusks in the family Spiraxidae. It contains the single species S. berendti. It is found in Mexico.
