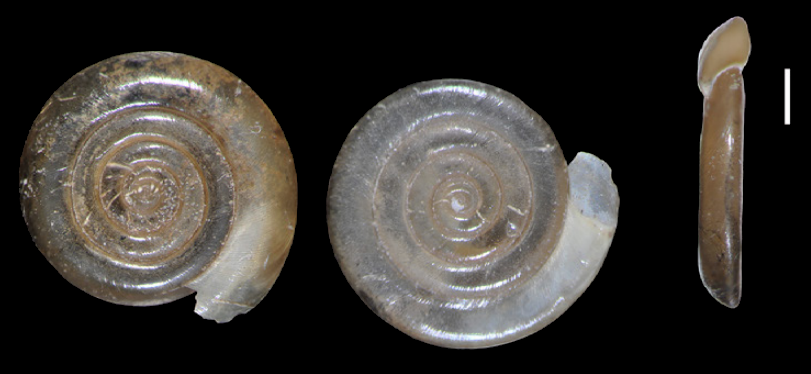
- A shell of D. cimex seen from multiple angles. Scale bar = 1 mm

Conservation status
- Least Concern (IUCN 3.1)

- Secure (NatureServe)

Scientific classification
- Kingdom: Animalia
- Phylum: Mollusca
- Class: Gastropoda
- Superorder: Hygrophila
- Family: Planorbidae
- Genus: Drepanotrema
- Species: D. cimex

Binomial name
- Drepanotrema cimex (Moricand, 1838)
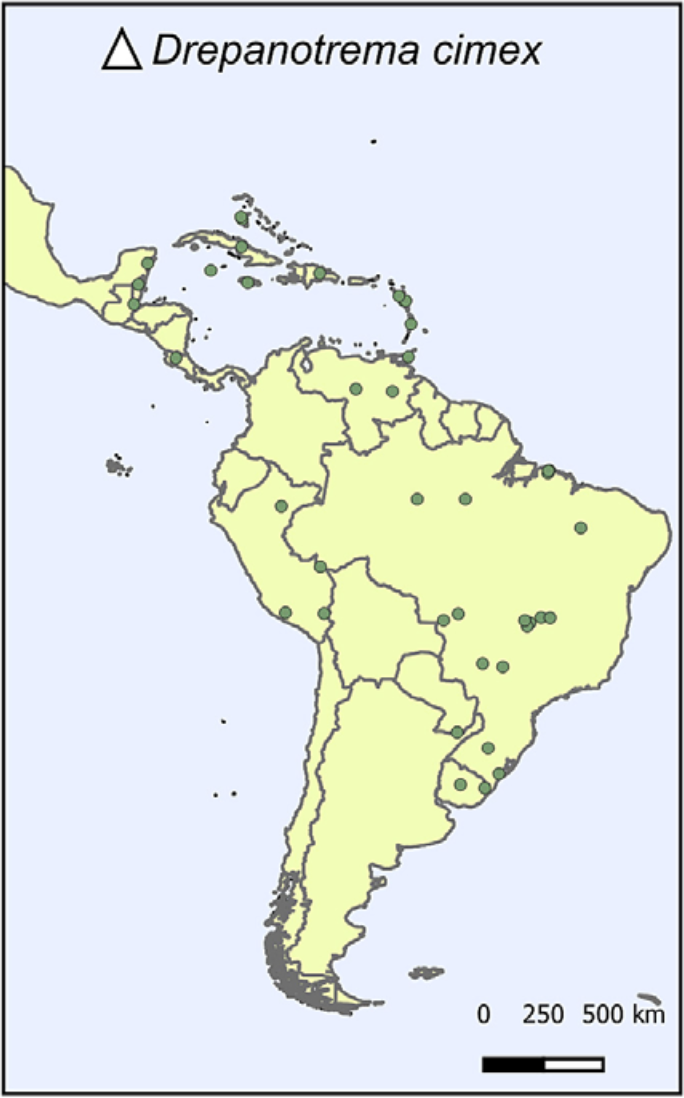
- Geographic distribution as of 2024

Synonyms
- List: Drepanotrema (Fossulorbis) cimex (Moricand, 1838); alternative representation; Drepanotrema chittyi Aguayo, 1935; junior synonym; Planorbis angulatus Chitty, 1853; junior synonym; Planorbis bavayi Crosse, 1875; unaccepted; Planorbis cimex Moricand, 1838; unaccepted (original combination); Planorbis macnabianus C. B. Adams, 1849; junior synonym; Planorbis poeyanus Clessin, 1884; junior synonym

= Drepanotrema cimex =

Species of mollusc

Drepanotrema cimex, also called the ridged ramshorn, is a small species of freshwater gastropod belonging to the family Planorbidae. Described in 1838, this species has a flat, brown shell measuring about 3–5 mm in diameter. It is thought to eat a mix of decaying matter, algae, and microbes called periphyton. This species is native to much of the Caribbean, Central America, and South America, and has been introduced to North America. It may occupy a variety of habitats, from streams to artificial ponds, and even temporary bodies of water, where it may go dormant to survive drying out. This snail may host trematode parasites of veterinary interest.

== Taxonomy ==
Drepanotrema cimex was first described as Planorbis cimex in 1838 by Moïse Étienne Moricand from specimens collected in Bahia, Brazil. This species was described again under many other names, including Planorbis macnabianus in 1849, Planorbis angulatus in 1853, Planorbis bavayi in 1875, Planorbis poeyanus in 1884, and Drepanotrema chittyi in 1935. It may also be referred to under the subgenus Fossulorbis, as Drepanotrema (Fossulorbis) cimex.

In 1930, Horace Burrington Baker moved the species from the genus Planorbis to Drepanotrema on the basis of similarities in the radula (a toothed, tongue-like organ). Additionally, he defined two subspecies: Drepanotrema cimex cimex, and Drepanotrema cimex pistiae. These are not always recognized, however. The last known taxonomic revision for this species was in 2021.

A total of 4 syntypes, or specimens used in original species descriptions, are known. 2 of these syntypes are from Moricand's original 1838 description, and are located at the Natural History Museum of Geneva. A syntype for Crosse's description of Planorbis bavayi is located at the National Museum of Natural History in France, and another syntype for Adams's description of Planorbis macnabianus is located at the Bavarian State Collection of Zoology in Germany.

== Description ==
=== Shell ===
Drepanotrema cimex has a brown, translucent shell with closely packed growth lines. It is small, measuring between 3–5 mm (0.12–0.20 in) in diameter on average, and 1–1.8 mm (0.039–0.071 in) in height. Some specimens may grow as large as 11.5 mm (0.45 in) in diameter. The opening of the shell (the aperture) is a narrow oval shape, and its outside edge (the lip) points to the left strongly. There are between 6 and 7 whorls (revolutions of the shell), and each whorl has a similar diameter. Like the aperture, the whorls are oblong and point to the left, giving the shell a distinctive angled appearance when viewed from above or below. The spire, which includes the coiled part of the shell before the final whorl, is very slightly concave, almost flat (more concave on the animal's right side). The sutures, or fusions between whorls, are more prominent on the right side than the left. During dry seasons, an apertural rib may be formed by thickening the walls of the shell near the aperture. Between 1 and 3 apertural ribs may be present on a given individual.

The shell is very similar to others in the genus (namely Drepanotrema kermatoides), so identification is usually not possible based on shell characteristics alone. It is also similar to the fossil species Omalodiscus spira and Menetus vetulus.

=== Reproductive tract ===
Drepanotrema cimex has a single ovotestis, an organ that produces both sperm and eggs. The ovotestis has between 25 and 50 small pocket-like structures called diverticules. The prostate gland, associated with the male reproductive system, also has diverticules, which are relatively short and number between 15 and 30. A structure called a penis sheath houses a simple penis (verge), though the penis is so long it may extend into the preputium. The preputium is an organ that generally contains muscles to help extend the penis outside of the body. The preputium is twice as long as the penis sheath, and on its inner walls, contains cilia (short, hair-like structures) as well as large, droplet-secreting cells. These cilia and droplet cells only appear on the proximal side of the surface, closest to the center of the animal. There are two thin, curved structures called flagella that attach to the base of the penis sheath. Both flagella are short, but one is significantly shorter and less developed than the other. The flagella and penis sheath are connected internally, sharing their lumen. The oviduct, which is the tube that eggs take to get from the ovotestis to the uterus, flares outwards at the uterine end into a pouch-like structure with finger-like projections.

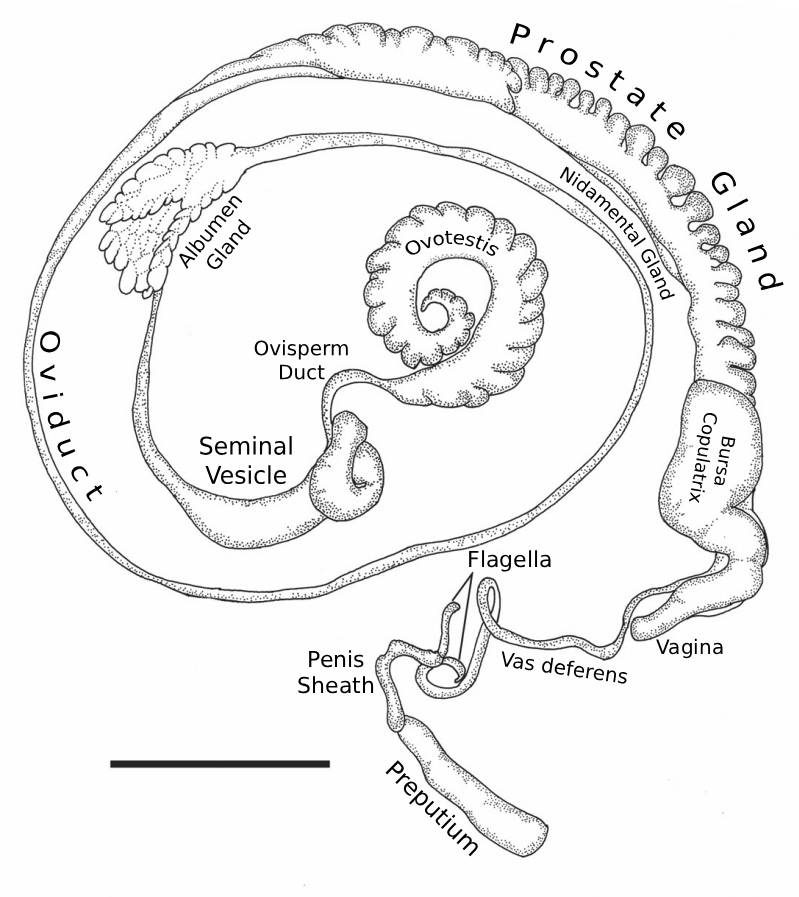
The reproductive system of D. cimex. Scale bar = 1 mm.

=== Other characteristics ===
This species has two black stripes on its underside on an organ called the foot, which it uses to move. These stripes extend from the front to the back of the animal. It has similarly colored stripes along the length of the tentacles near its eyes. The mantle cavity, an internal space housing several organs, does not have folds corresponding to the kidneys or digestive system. The radula (a toothed, tongue-like organ) is typical of the genus.

== Distribution and conservation ==
Drepanotrema cimex is found across much of the Caribbean, Central America, and South America, including Puerto Rico, the Virgin Islands, the Bahamas, Jamaica, Cuba, parts of Mexico, Panama, Venezuela, Brazil, Paraguay, Uruguay, and Argentina. It is considered an introduced species in the United States and Canada (except for U.S. Caribbean territories), but is native along all other parts of its range.

Information about their introduction to North America is limited, with only one source showing that it is established in the Great Lakes region. Beyond this, however, the only specific occurrences in the United States are preserved specimens. No occurrences from Canada have ever been recorded. Other sources seem to doubt its ability to colonize habitats outside of where it is already established.

The suitable habitat for D. cimex occupies an area of roughly 8,500,000 km^{2} (3,300,000 mi^{2}). Habitat loss due to climate change is projected to affect this species strongly, impacting its future distribution. At maximum, this species may lose over half of its 2024 habitat by 2090.

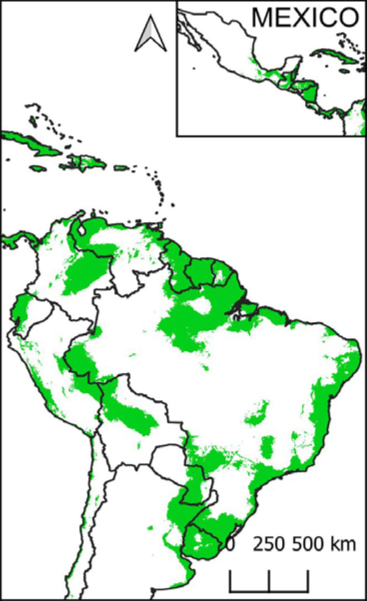
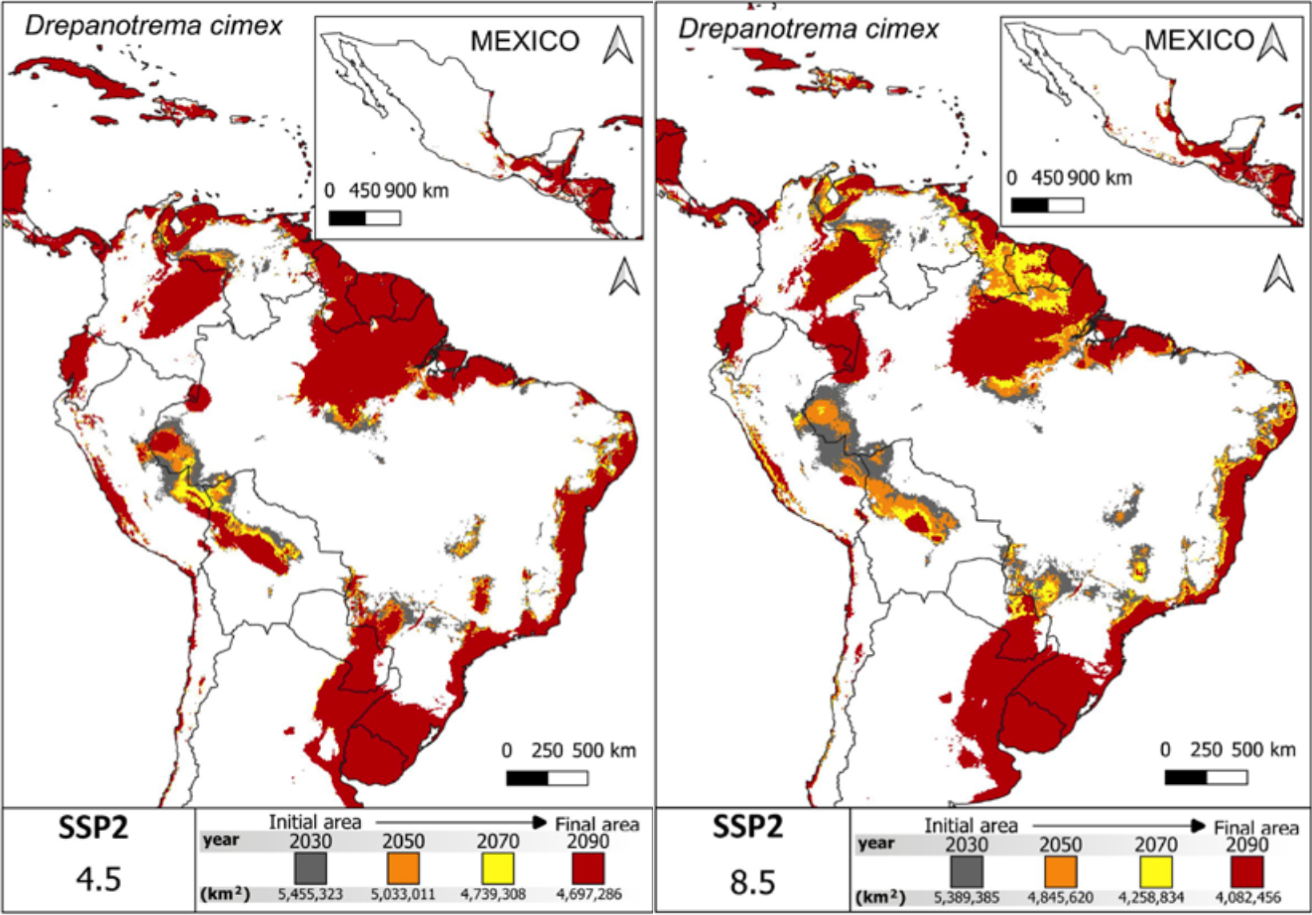
Suitable habitat for D. cimex as of 2024 (left), in an optimistic scenario (middle), and in a pessimistic scenario (right).

Despite habitat concerns, the IUCN has listed this species as "Least Concern" globally since 2011, and NatureServe has listed it as "G5 – Secure" since 2007. Both of these rankings represent species with the healthiest populations. Locally, however, populations on the island of Guadeloupe are declining, and are considered Vulnerable.

== Habitat ==
This species may be found in streams, marshes, and even temporary ponds. It is highly associated with bodies of water that contain lots of vegetation, including those in the families Lemnoideae and Hydrocharitaceae, as well as the species Hydrocotyle ranunculoides, Canna glauca, and Typha latifolia.

D. cimex has been found to be very tolerant of man-made bodies of water and some amount of pollution, which increases its risk of becoming an introduced species. Suitable habitats may include drainage ditches, reservoirs for hydroelectric power plants, and aquaculture enclosures. In Argentina, it was even found in a garbage dump site with high concentrations of ammonium and phosphates.

This species may be found in water temperatures between 12 and 27.5 °C (53.6 and 81.5 °F). Water temperature is especially significant for this species since population growth is affected primarily by temperature, with lower temperatures yielding faster growth. Other habitat characteristics typical of this species include low pH and silty substrate.

== Ecology ==
In one study, populations of this species numbered about 65–78 individuals per square meter, and at maximum were found at densities of about 2,000 individuals per square meter. Despite seemingly high densities, it may only make up a small fraction of the total mollusk fauna in its habitat.

In temporary habitats, D. cimex can aestivate, or go dormant, during the dry season by increasing the thickness of the shell around the aperture (shell opening). Although the function of this thickened structure, called an apertural rib, is still unknown, it is likely associated with aestivation. One hypothesis is that it serves to reduce damage to the shell opening from soil compaction. To prevent drying out while exposed to the air, the snail will also form a thin, transparent membrane called an epiphragm, which seals the animal inside its shell.

This species is known to glide along the surface of the water using surface tension, and is quite active. It is likely a detritivore, feeding on decaying plant matter and periphyton (algae, bacteria, and other microbes).

Drepanotrema cimex has been shown to be an intermediate host of several parasitic trematode larvae, called cercariae, which may be of veterinary interest. 16% of all individuals captured from Santa Catarina Island in Brazil were infected with at least one of two Cercaria species. Cercariae in the family Strigeidae, which later infect amphibians, birds, and reptiles, were found in about 3% of all specimens from Minas Gerais in Brazil. This species may also be infected with cercariae from the suborder Xiphidiata and family Echinostomatidae. Once metamorphosed, these parasites may have a variety of impacts on wildlife, including damage to the intestines, malformation of limbs, increased mortality, and more. This species is not known to host the trematode Schistosoma mansoni, which causes Schistosomiasis in humans.

== Reproduction and growth ==
Drepanotrema cimex reaches sexual maturity upon reaching a shell diameter of around 3–5 mm (0.12–0.20 in). These snails may live longer than one year. Like other planorbids, reproduction is probably linked to seasons with high rainfall. The populations of this species are among the fastest growing in the genus. It has also been bred successfully in captivity.
