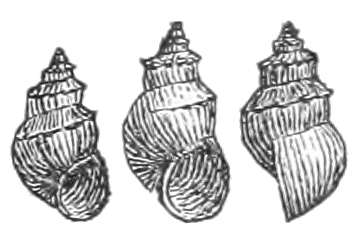
- Drawing of two apertural views and one lateral view of shells of Pyrgophorus spinosus

Scientific classification
- Domain: Eukaryota
- Kingdom: Animalia
- Phylum: Mollusca
- Class: Gastropoda
- Subclass: Caenogastropoda
- Order: Littorinimorpha
- Family: Cochliopidae
- Genus: Pyrgophorus; Ancey, 1888

= Pyrgophorus =

Genus of gastropods

Pyrgophorus is a genus of very small freshwater snails with a gill and an operculum, aquatic gastropod molluscs in the family Hydrobiidae.

== Species ==
Species in the genus Pyrgophorus include:

- Pyrgophorus cisterninus (Küster, 1852)
- Pyrgophorus parvulus (Guilding, 1828)
- Pyrgophorus platyrachis (Thompson, 1968) - serrate crownsnail
- Pyrgophorus spinosus (Call & Pilsbry, 1886) - spiny crownsnail
- Pyrgophorus coronatus (Pfeiffer, 1840)
