= Pyrgophorus platyrachis =

Conservation status
- Secure (NatureServe)

Scientific classification
- Kingdom: Animalia
- Phylum: Mollusca
- Class: Gastropoda
- Subclass: Caenogastropoda
- Order: Littorinimorpha
- Family: Cochliopidae
- Genus: Pyrgophorus
- Species: P. platyrachis

Binomial name
- Pyrgophorus platyrachis F. G. Thompson, 1968

Species of gastropod

Pyrgophorus platyrachis is a species of very small aquatic snail, an operculate gastropod mollusk in the family Hydrobiidae.

== Description ==
The maximum recorded shell length is 5.3 mm.

== Habitat ==
The minimum recorded depth for this species is 0 m, and the maximum recorded depth is 0 m.
