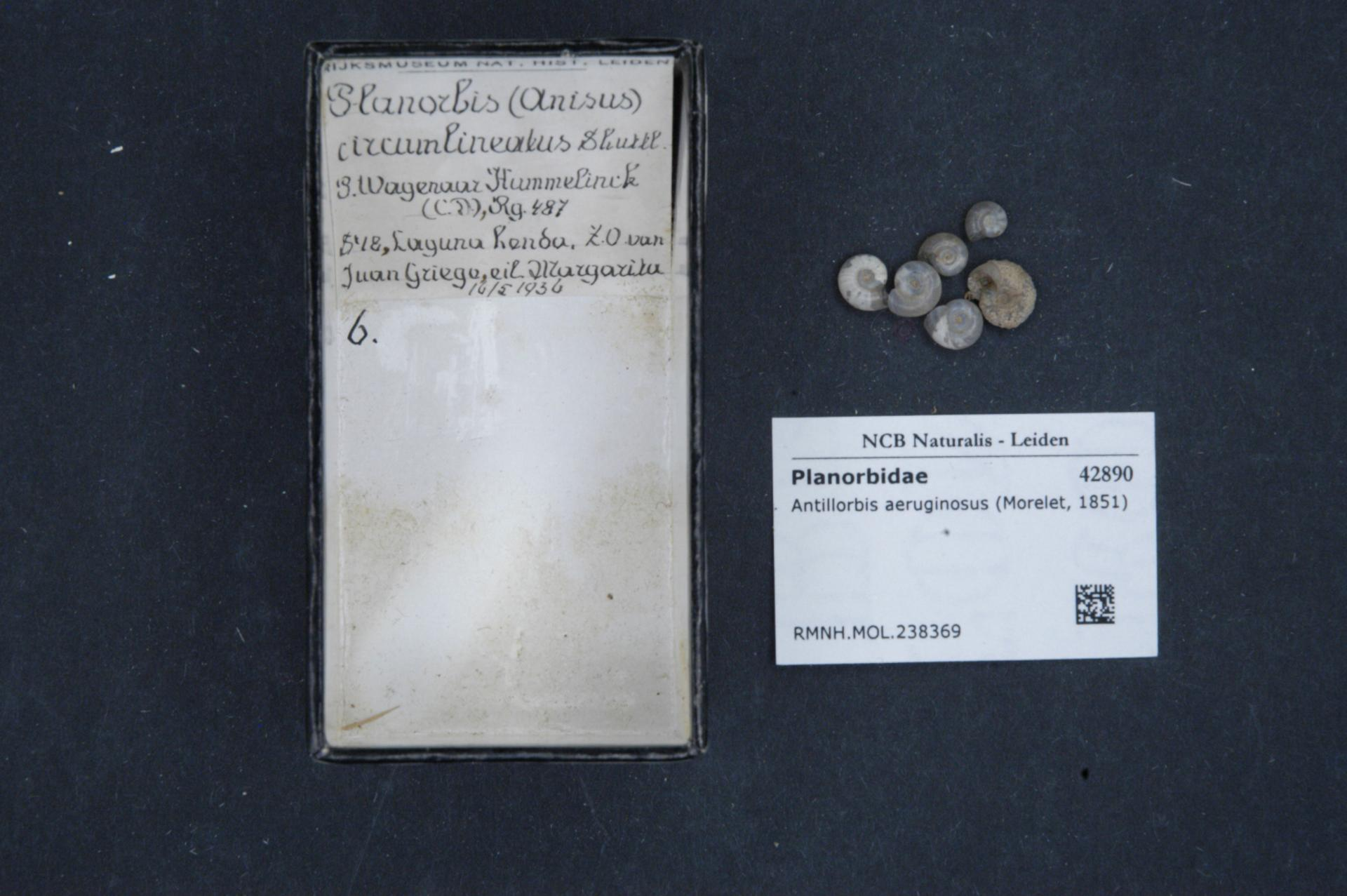

Conservation status
- Secure (NatureServe)

Scientific classification
- Kingdom: Animalia
- Phylum: Mollusca
- Class: Gastropoda
- Superorder: Hygrophila
- Family: Planorbidae
- Genus: Antillorbis
- Species: A. aeruginosus

Binomial name
- Antillorbis aeruginosus (Morelet, 1851)

Synonyms
- List: Drepanotrema aeruginosum (Morelet, 1851); superseded combination; Gyraulus arizonensis (Pilsbry & Ferriss, 1915); junior subjective synonym; Helicodiscus lineatus sonorensis J. G. Cooper, 1893; junior subjective synonym; Planorbis aeruginosus Morelet, 1851;superseded combination; Planorbis arizonensis Pilsbry & Ferriss, 1915; superseded combination; Planorbis circumlineatus Shuttleworth, 1854; original combination (unaccepted); Planorbis filocinctus Pilsbry & Ferriss, 1906; unaccepted

= Antillorbis aeruginosus =

Species of gastropod

Antillorbis aeruginosus, also called the rusty ramshorn or coppery ramshorn, is a small species of freshwater planorbid snail from Central and North America. Globally, the species is doing well and is considered secure, but on the island of Martinique it is critically endangered.

== Taxonomy ==
This species was originally described by Arthur Morelet in 1851 as Planorbis aeruginosus. It was redescribed several times under many names, including Planorbis circumlineatus in 1854, Helicodiscus lineatus sonorensis (a subspecies of Helicodiscus parallelus) in 1893, Planorbis filocinctus in 1906, and Planorbis arizonensis 1915.

Some sources argue that Tropicorbis decipiens was misidentified as a new species, and that it is actually a synonym of Antillorbis aeruginosus. This has not been confirmed, however.

== Description ==
=== Shell ===
The shell of Antillorbis aeruginosus is between 3 and 5 mm (0.12 and 0.20 in) in width and 1 mm in height. It may have colored bands across the shell. The umbilicus is sunken on both sides, giving a concave appearance. The left side is more concave than the right. There are between 2 and 3 whorls. The lip of the aperture is rounded, but is asymmetrical with the right side being straighter. The aperture is about the same dimensions in both its width and height, and has an overall heart shape. There is a slight sculpture made of grooves that grow parallel to the shell's coil.

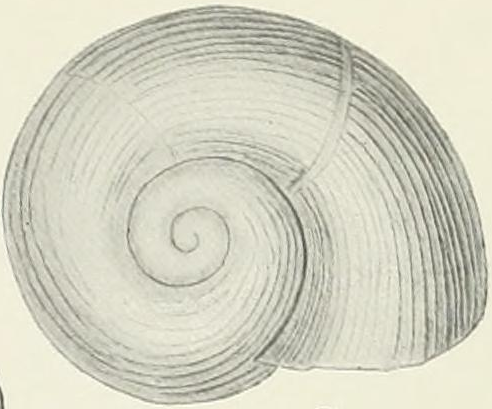
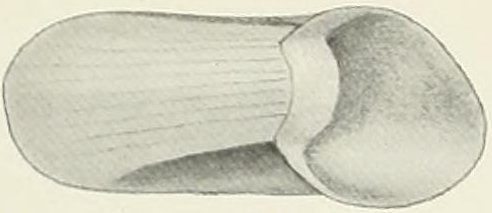
Drawings depicting the spiraling, grooved sculpture (left), the asymmetrical, heart-shaped aperture (right), and left/right concavities (right)

The spiraling sculpture is similar to that of Helicodiscus parallelus. The two species can be distinguished by the shape of the aperture (including the lack of denticles), the smaller umbilicus, and the wider whorls. Additionally, the shell of A. aeruginosus may be distinguished from Antillorbis nordestensis by the presence of sculpture, the rounder aperture, and the larger size.

=== Reproductive features ===
Two flagella attach to the base of the penis sheath, which are much longer than those of Antillorbis nordestensis (around 475 microns). Unlike the genus Drepanotrema, these flagella do not share their lumen with the penis sheath. Other reproductive features, including the preputium and penis sheath, are nearly twice as long as those of A. nordestensis (723 and 618 microns, respectively).

== Distribution ==
Antillorbis aeruginosus is found throughout Central America, the Southwestern United States, and several Caribbean islands. Specific occurrences have been recorded in the Mexican states of Sonora and Querétaro, the Mexican island of Cozumel, the U.S. states of Arizona and Texas, the U.S. territories of Puerto Rico and Saint Thomas Island, and the Haitian/Dominican Republican island of Hispanola.

== Habitat and ecology ==
Antillorbis aeruginosus may be found in temporary pools of water, and can aestivate during the dry period. It may be found in very high densities. It may also inhabit streams, springs, marshes, and ponds.

== Conservation status ==
According to NatureServe, Antillorbis aeruginosus is considered secure (G5) worldwide, though it only considers Texas and Arizona. In Mexico, it is considered to be apparently secure (N4). On the island of Martinique, the IUCN lists it as critically endangered.
