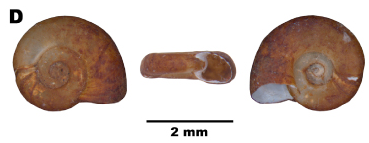

Scientific classification
- Kingdom: Animalia
- Phylum: Mollusca
- Class: Gastropoda
- Superorder: Hygrophila
- Family: Planorbidae
- Genus: Antillorbis
- Species: A. nordestensis

Binomial name
- Antillorbis nordestensis (Lucena, 1954)

Synonyms
- Drepanotrema nordestense (Lucena, 1954); Tropicorbis nordestensis Lucena, 1954

= Antillorbis nordestensis =

Antillorbis nordestensis Temporal range: Upper Holocene–Present

Species of gastropod

Antillorbis nordestensis is an extant species of planorbid snail from South America. It may be introduced in some areas, though it is unclear if it is invasive. This species can host trematode parasites, and has a fossil record dating back around 680 years.

== Taxonomy ==
Antillorbis nordestensis was described as Tropicorbis nordestensis by D. T. Lucena in 1954.

== Description ==
=== Shell ===
The shell of Antillorbis nordestensis is white, though its true color may be obscured by brown or black organic matter growing on it. It is about 2.5 mm (0.098 in) in width on average, with a maximum diameter of around 5 mm. The diameter of the aperture is about 1.4 mm. The aperture is more oval-shaped than that of Antillorbis aeruginosus. The umbilicus protrudes more on the right side of the shell, though both sides are still concave. There are between 2–4 whorls, which quickly grow in width. The sutures between the whorls are set deeply. The final whorl may be bent to the left or may be straight. There may be a very slight sculpture consisting of fine spiraling grooves, though its presence is not as prevalent as in A. aeruginosus.

=== Reproductive tract ===
The ovotestes have between 10 and 25 diverticules, and the prostate gland has between 4–10. Two flagella attach to the base of the penis sheath. Compared to A. aeruginosus, the length of the penis sheath, flagella, and preputium of A. nordestensis are much shorter (294, 111, and 388 microns, respectively). This difference in size is irrespective of the age of the snail.

=== Other characteristics ===
The head and foot are light gray in color, while the mantle is only slightly colored.

== Distribution ==
Antillorbis nordestensis can be found across much of South America, including Brazil, Bolivia, Uruguay, and even as far south as Mascardi Lake in Argentina. It is unclear how much of this is its native range, and it is hypothesized to be introduced in Bolivia.

== Habitat ==
This species is found more frequently in habitats with low concentrations of dissolved oxygen and low pH. It is found in both stagnant and flowing shallow waters, and is hypothesized to be able to aestivate when the water dries up. In Bolivia, it lives in water temperatures between 3–28 °C (37–82 °F).

== Ecology ==
A. nordestensis may be found in low densities alongside other aquatic mollusks, including Pisidium taraguyense, Biomphalaria straminea, Biomphalaria peregrina, Musculium argentinum, and Drepanotrema heloicum. Often, it is found in environments with dense aquatic vegetation, and is assumed to be herbivorous. It may act as an intermediate host for macroderoidid trematode parasites.

== Fossil record ==
Fossils of Antillorbis nordestensis are known in very low quantities from the lower Salado Basin in Argentina. These fossils are very recent, from the late Holocene about 680 (±60) years ago. 31 more fossils were also recovered from the broader Pampas region of Argentina from the late Holocene.
