= Pyrgophorus cisterninus =

Scientific classification
- Kingdom: Animalia
- Phylum: Mollusca
- Class: Gastropoda
- Subclass: Caenogastropoda
- Order: Littorinimorpha
- Family: Cochliopidae
- Genus: Pyrgophorus
- Species: P. cisterninus

Binomial name
- Pyrgophorus cisterninus (Küster, 1852)

Species of gastropod

Pyrgophorus cisterninus is a species of very small aquatic snail, an operculate gastropod mollusk in the family Hydrobiidae.
