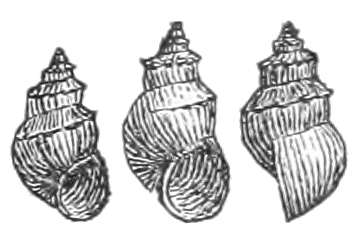
- Drawing of two apertural views and one lateral view of the shell of Pyrgophorus spinosus

Conservation status
- Vulnerable (NatureServe)

Scientific classification
- Kingdom: Animalia
- Phylum: Mollusca
- Class: Gastropoda
- Subclass: Caenogastropoda
- Order: Littorinimorpha
- Family: Cochliopidae
- Genus: Pyrgophorus
- Species: P. spinosus

Binomial name
- Pyrgophorus spinosus (Call & Pilsbry, 1886)

Synonyms
- Pyrgulopsis spinosus Call & Pilsbry, 1886; Pyrgulopsis (Pyrgophorus) spinosa var. brevispira Ancey, 1888

= Pyrgophorus spinosus =

Species of gastropod

Pyrgophorus spinosus, common name the spiny crownsnail, is a species of very small freshwater snail with a gill and an operculum, an aquatic gastropod mollusk in the family Hydrobiidae.

== Taxonomy ==
Pyrgophorus spinosus was described by Richard Ellsworth Call and by Henry Augustus Pilsbry in 1886 as Pyrgulopsis spinosus but until César Marie Félix Ancey established the new genus Pyrgophorus in 1888, it was not clear what genus this species belonged to.

== Shell description ==
The shell is minute, imperforate, turreted and unicarinate. The carina is modified into spinous processes on last three whorls. The carina is darker colored than balance of shell. The shell has 5-5½ whorls. The first two whorls are rounded, destitute of spines or carina. The last three whorls are somewhat geniculate, angled at location of carina. The body whorl is large, sometimes with an occasional spine below the carina. The epidermis is light horn in color, nearly white at apex, with microscopic longitudinal revolving striae and shining.

The aperture is roundly ovate, slightly longer than broad and rounded anteriorly. The peristome is not continuous. The peristome is sharp, simple, slightly reflected near the columella, suggesting a faint umbilicus. The suture is slightly impressed.

The width of the shell is 1.52-2.34 mm. The height of the shell is 3.00-3.86 mm.

The operculum is spiral and reddish horn in color.

== Distribution ==
The type locality is Comal Creek, a clear stream at New Braunfels, Texas, on rocky bottoms.

== Habitat ==
In 1886, Pyrgophorus spinosus inhabited its type locality along with numerous specimens of Goniobasis pleuristriata Say, Amnicola (species undetermined), and Bythinella (species undetermined).
