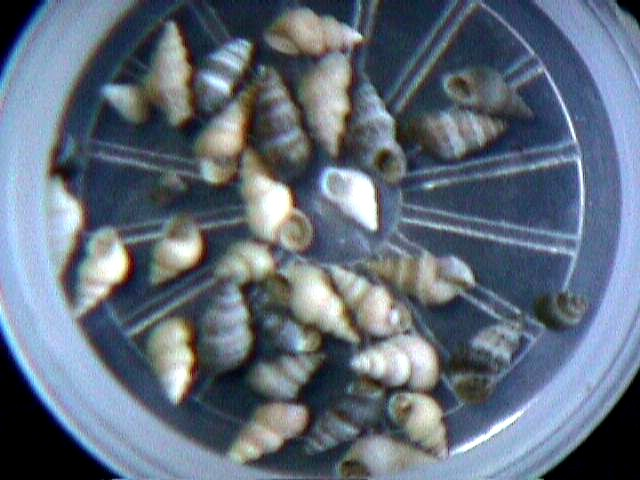
- A group of Pyrgophorus coronatus in the cap of a vial

Conservation status
- Secure (NatureServe)

Scientific classification
- Kingdom: Animalia
- Phylum: Mollusca
- Class: Gastropoda
- Subclass: Caenogastropoda
- Order: Littorinimorpha
- Family: Cochliopidae
- Genus: Pyrgophorus
- Species: P. coronatus

Binomial name
- Pyrgophorus coronatus (Pfeiffer, 1840)

Subspecies
- P. c. bermudezi (Aguayo, 1947); P. c. coronatus (Pfeiffer, 1840)

Synonyms
- Amnicola coronata (Pfeiffer, 1840); Hydrobia coronata (Pfeiffer, 1840); Paludina cisternicola Morelet, 1851; Paludina coronata Pfeiffer, 1840; Paludina coronata var. cisternina Küster, 1852; Potamopyrgus coronatus (Pfeiffer, 1840); Pyrgophorus cisterninus (Küster, 1852); Pyrgulopsis (Pyrgophorus) coronatus Ancey, 1888

= Pyrgophorus coronatus =

Species of gastropod

Pyrgophorus coronatus is a species of very small aquatic snail, an operculate gastropod mollusk or micromollusk in the family Hydrobiidae.

== Distribution and habitat ==
In Nicaragua, it is found in abundance in the volcanic crater lakes Xiloa and Apoyo.
