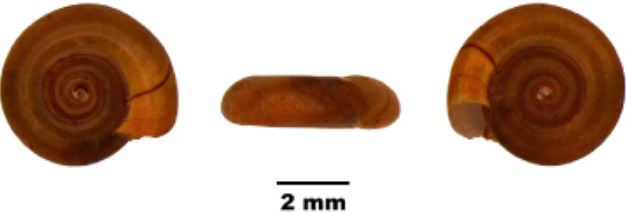

Scientific classification
- Kingdom: Animalia
- Phylum: Mollusca
- Class: Gastropoda
- Superorder: Hygrophila
- Family: Planorbidae
- Genus: Drepanotrema
- Species: D. lucidum

Binomial name
- Drepanotrema lucidum (Pfeiffer, 1839)

= Drepanotrema lucidum =

Species of mollusc

Drepanotrema lucidum is a species of gastropods belonging to the family Planorbidae.

The species is found in Central and Southern Africa.
