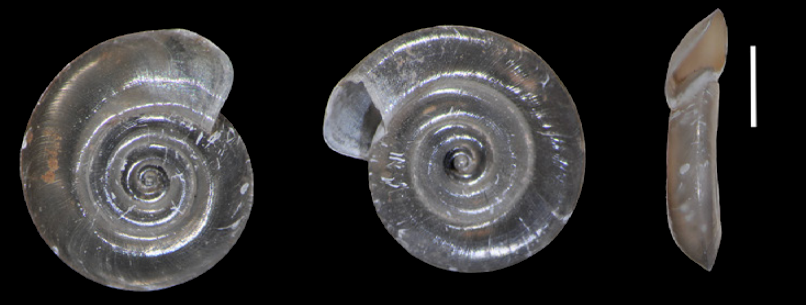
- Scale bar = 1 mm

Conservation status
- Secure (NatureServe)

Scientific classification
- Kingdom: Animalia
- Phylum: Mollusca
- Class: Gastropoda
- Superorder: Hygrophila
- Family: Planorbidae
- Genus: Drepanotrema
- Species: D. kermatoides

Binomial name
- Drepanotrema kermatoides (d'Orbigny, 1835)

= Drepanotrema kermatoides =

Species of mollusc

Drepanotrema kermatoides is a species of gastropods belonging to the family Planorbidae.

The species is found in Southern America.
