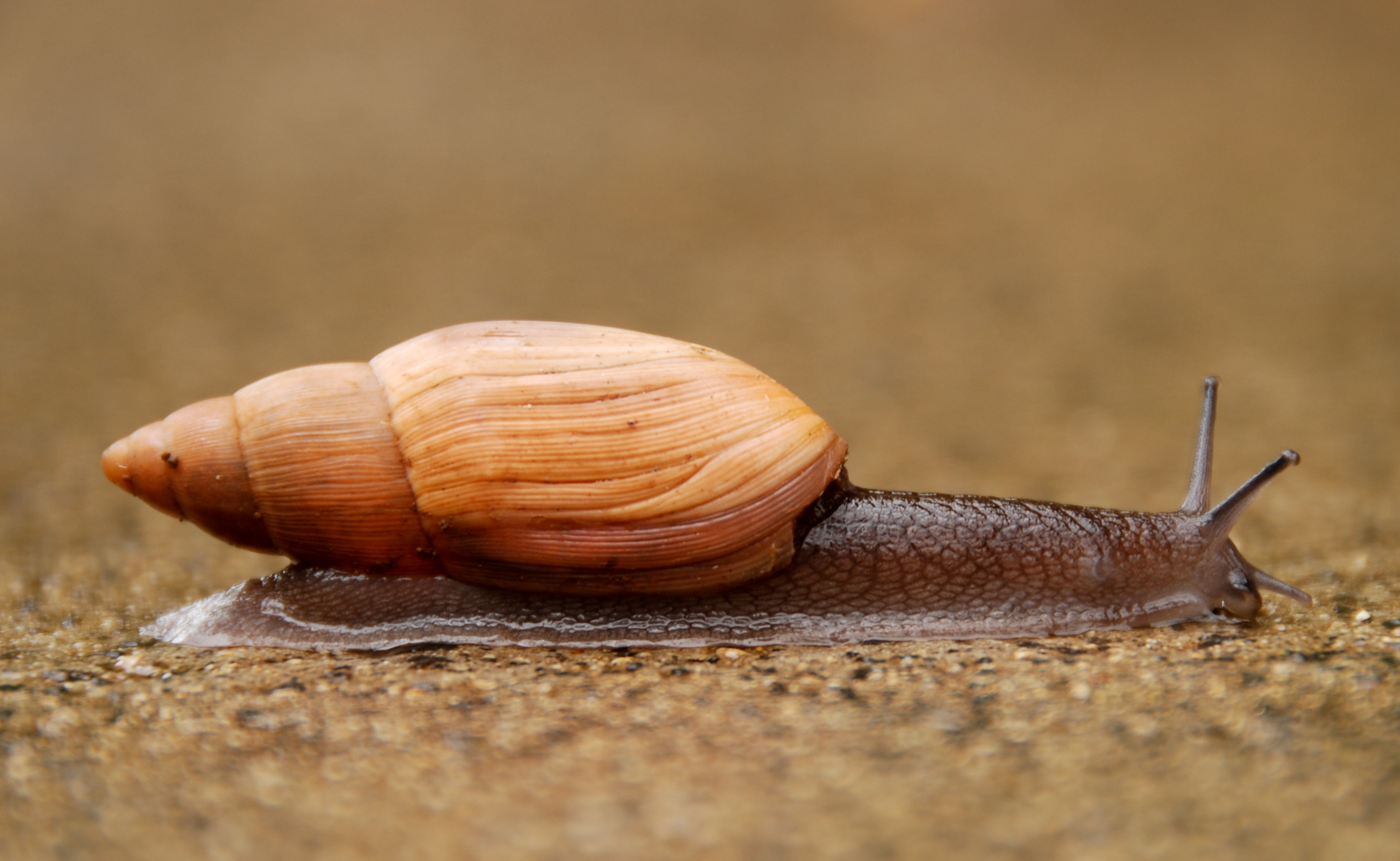
- A live individual of Euglandina rosea

Scientific classification
- Kingdom: Animalia
- Phylum: Mollusca
- Class: Gastropoda
- Order: Stylommatophora
- Superfamily: Oleacinoidea
- Family: Spiraxidae; H. B. Baker, 1939

Type genus
- Spiraxis

Genera
- See text

Diversity
- over 260 species in Central America + some more in South America

= Spiraxidae =

Family of gastropods

Spiraxidae is a family of predatory air-breathing land snails, terrestrial pulmonate gastropods in the superfamily Testacelloidea (according to the taxonomy of the Gastropoda by Bouchet & Rocroi, 2005).

== Distribution ==
The distribution of this family is Neotropical.

== Taxonomy ==
=== 2005 taxonomy ===
The family Spiraxidae is classified within the informal group Sigmurethra, itself belonging to the clade Stylommatophora within the clade Eupulmonata (according to the taxonomy of the Gastropoda by Bouchet & Rocroi, 2005).

The family Spiraxidae consists of the following subfamilies:

- Spiraxinae H. B. Baker, 1939
- Micromeninae Schileyko, 2000

=== 2010 taxonomy ===
Thompson (2010) redefined subfamilies in the Spiraxidae, moving Euglandininae and Streptostylinae to become subfamilies of Spiraxidae. According to their work, there are three subfamilies within the Spiraxidae:

- Spiraxinae H. B. Baker, 1939 - including Micromena
- Euglandininae H. B. Baker, 1941
- Streptostylinae H. B. Baker, 1941

Apparently this system of classification is not universally accepted, as Fauna Europaea uses different systematics for the subfamily Euglandininae, still placing it within the family Oleacinidae.

== Genera ==
Genera in the family Spiraxidae include:

Subfamily Spiraxinae include seven genera:

- Mayaxis Thompson, 1995
- Micromena H. B. Baker, 1939 - this was the type genus of the subfamily Micromeninae
- Miraradula Baker, 1939
- Pseudosubulina Strebel & Pfeffer, 1882
- Rectaxis Baker, 1926
- Spiraxis C. B. Adams, 1850 - type genus of family Spiraxidae
- Volutaxis Strebel & Pfeffer, 1882

Subfamily Euglandininae

- Euglandina Crosse & P. Fischer, 1870 - type genus of the subfamily Euglandininae
- Guillarmodia H. B. Baker, 1941
- Pittieria von Martens, 1901
- Poiretia Fischer, 1883
- Varicoglandina Pilsbry, 1908
- Varicoturris Pilsbry, 1907

Subfamily Streptostylinae

- Myxastyla Thompson, 1995
- Oryzosoma Pilsbry, 1891
- Salasiella Strebel, 1877
- Strebelia Crosse & Fischer, 1868
- Streptostyla Shuttleworth, 1852 - type genus of the subfamily Streptostylinae

== Ecology ==
These land snails are carnivorous and predatory.
