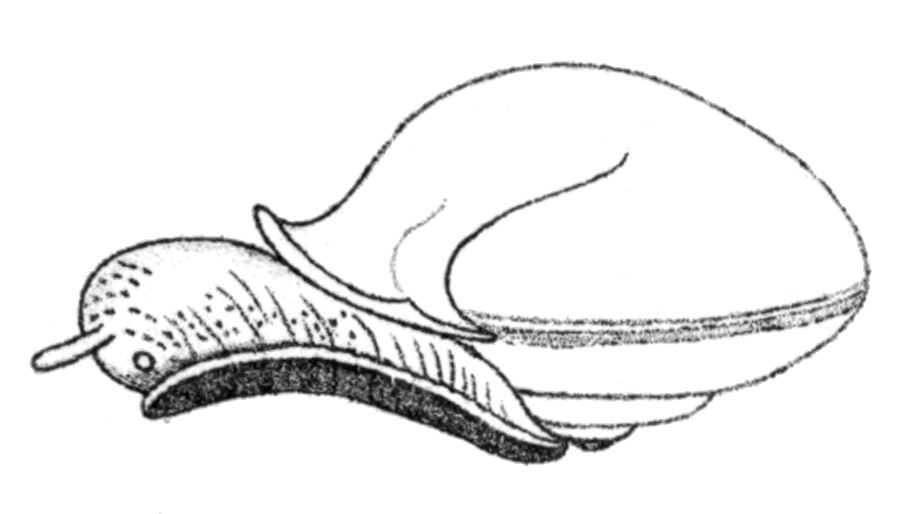
- A drawing of a preserved specimen of Ringicella ringens showing how the snail carries the shell with the spire pointing downwards

Scientific classification
- Kingdom: Animalia
- Phylum: Mollusca
- Class: Gastropoda
- Order: Stylommatophora
- Family: Tomogeridae
- Genus: Ringicella; Gray, 1847

= Ringicella =

Genus of gastropods

Ringicella is a genus of tropical air-breathing land snails, terrestrial pulmonate gastropod mollusks in the family Odontostomidae.

Adult snails of this genus have an extremely unusual shell morphology, very similar to that found in the genus Anostoma Fischer von Waldheim, 1807, of which this genus was previously considered to be merely a subgenus.

The adult snails in this genus carry their shells upside down, with the spire or apex at the bottom, and the umbilicus at the top.

== Shell description ==
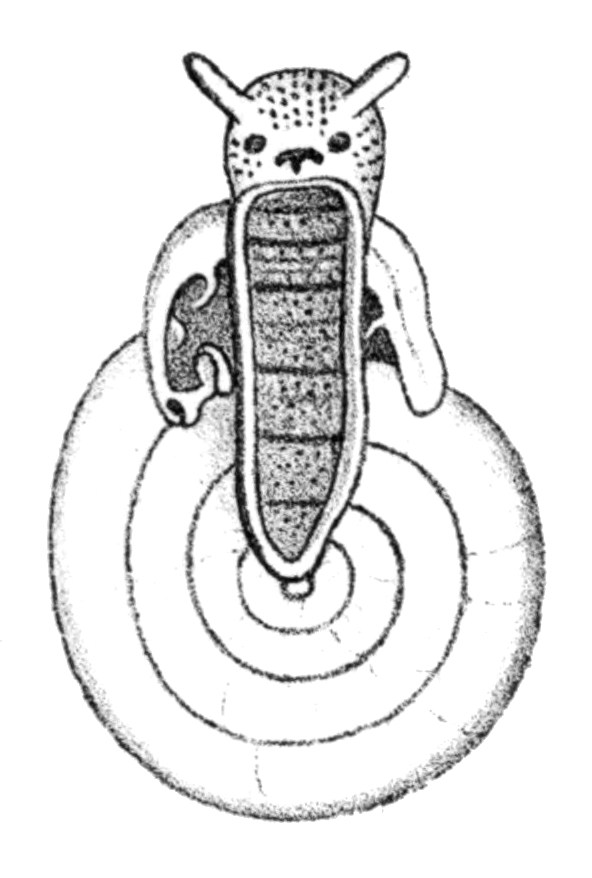
A drawing of a preserved specimen of Ringicella ringens as seen from the underside. The view shows the under surface of the foot, the head, the shell aperture, and the spire of the shell. Note the perforation in the lip of the shell.

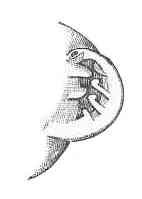
Drawing of aperture of Ringicella carinatum showing the apertural teeth and the perforation in the peristome

The shell of Ringicella is very similar to that of Anostoma.

Shells of the genus Ringicella have an additional feature: the angular lamella and upper suprapalatal fold are concrescent, forming a perforation in the lip at its upper end.

In addition, the apertural rim incorporates a small tube, which communicates with the interior of the shell.

The width of adult shells varies from 18 to 25 mm.

== Anatomy ==
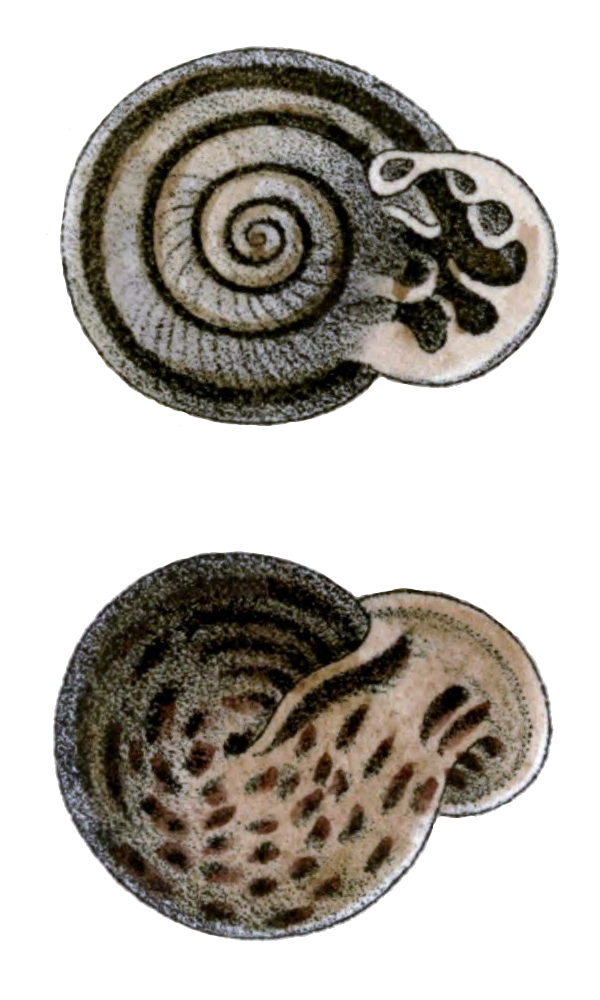
A colored drawing of an adult shell of Ringicella carinatum

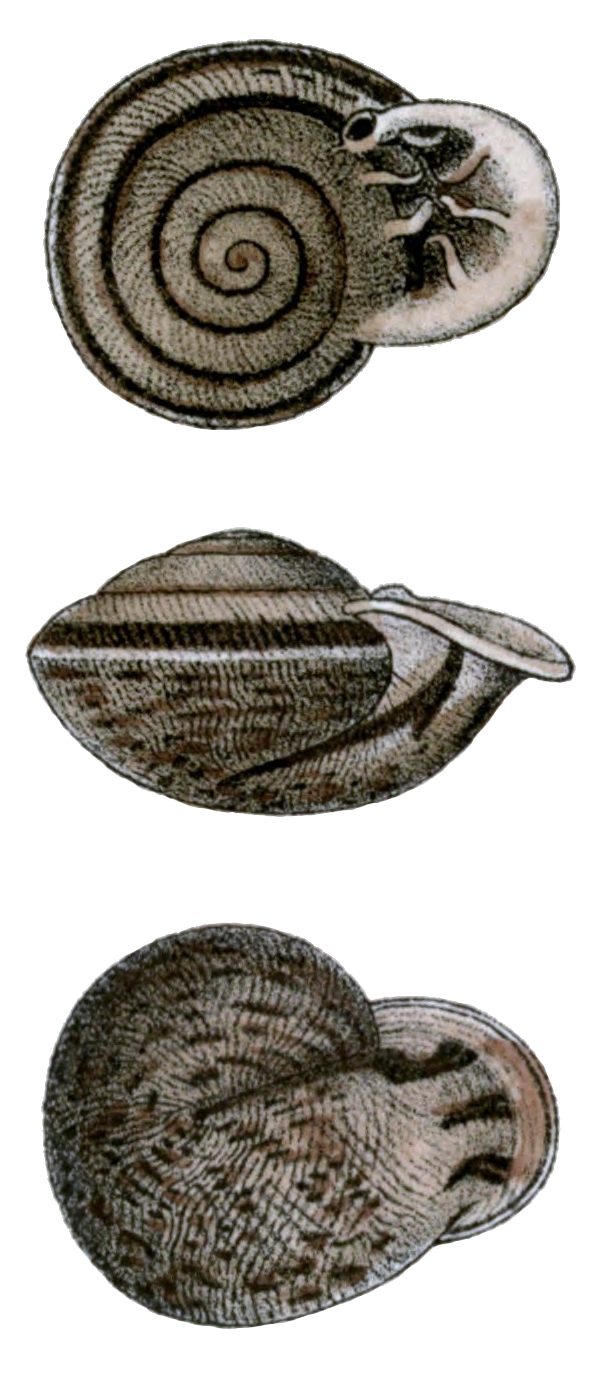
A colored drawing of an adult shell of Ringicella ringens

This section is based on the anatomy of Ringicella ringens, which is also valid for the genus Anostoma (according to 1901 information from Pilsbry).

Unlike the shell, the soft anatomy is not especially peculiar, in so far as it is known from Dr. Paul Fischer's (1857) account of Ringicella ringens.

=== Radula ===
The jaw and teeth are as they are in Macrodontes. The radula of Ringicella (and also Macrodontes) is rather aberrant for Bulimulinae: the central and lateral teeth have no side cusps, the marginals have an ectocone; the basal plate is short. The jaw is smooth, arcuate. The teeth are as in the terrestrial Holopoda (see taxonomy of Holopoda) generally, the centrals and laterals with single broad cusps, marginals short, with the ectocone developed.

=== Genitalia ===
The genitalia are essentially similar to those of Odontostomus. The genitalia are exceedingly lengthened in Ringicella. The genitalia are of the haplogonous type, the long slender penis passing into a long vas deferens, upon which the penis retractor muscle is inserted; the duct of the globular spermatheca is extremely long. The elongation of the whole genital system is greater than in Helicoid snails generally, and doubtless correlated with the unusual length of the last whorl.

Araujo (1963) described male copulatory organs of Ringicella ringens as spirally coiled, that is different from previous description by Fischer and by Pilsbry.

=== Central nervous system ===
The cerebral ganglia are more separated than usual in the Holopoda. The cerebral ganglia are connected by a short narrow commissure; the suboesophageal ganglia are as usual in the Bulimulinae.

== Distribution ==
This genus of snails occurs in Brazil.

Pilsbry (1901) mentioned Ringicella carinatum as also occurring in Colombia, in high forests of the Magdalena River basin at 1830 m (6000 feet) above sea level, but Vera Ardila (2008) considers the presence of the species in Colombia to be doubtful.

== Species ==
Species within this genus include:

- Ringicella carinatum (Pfeiffer, 1853) - synonym of Anostoma carinatum Pfeiffer, 1853
- Ringicella luetzelburgi (Weber, 1925) - synonym of Anostoma rossi Weber, 1925
- Ringicella ringens (Linnaeus, 1758) - synonym of: Anostoma ringens (Linnaeus, 1758), Anostoma globulosa Lamarck, 1822, Anostoma globulosum Lamarck, 1822
