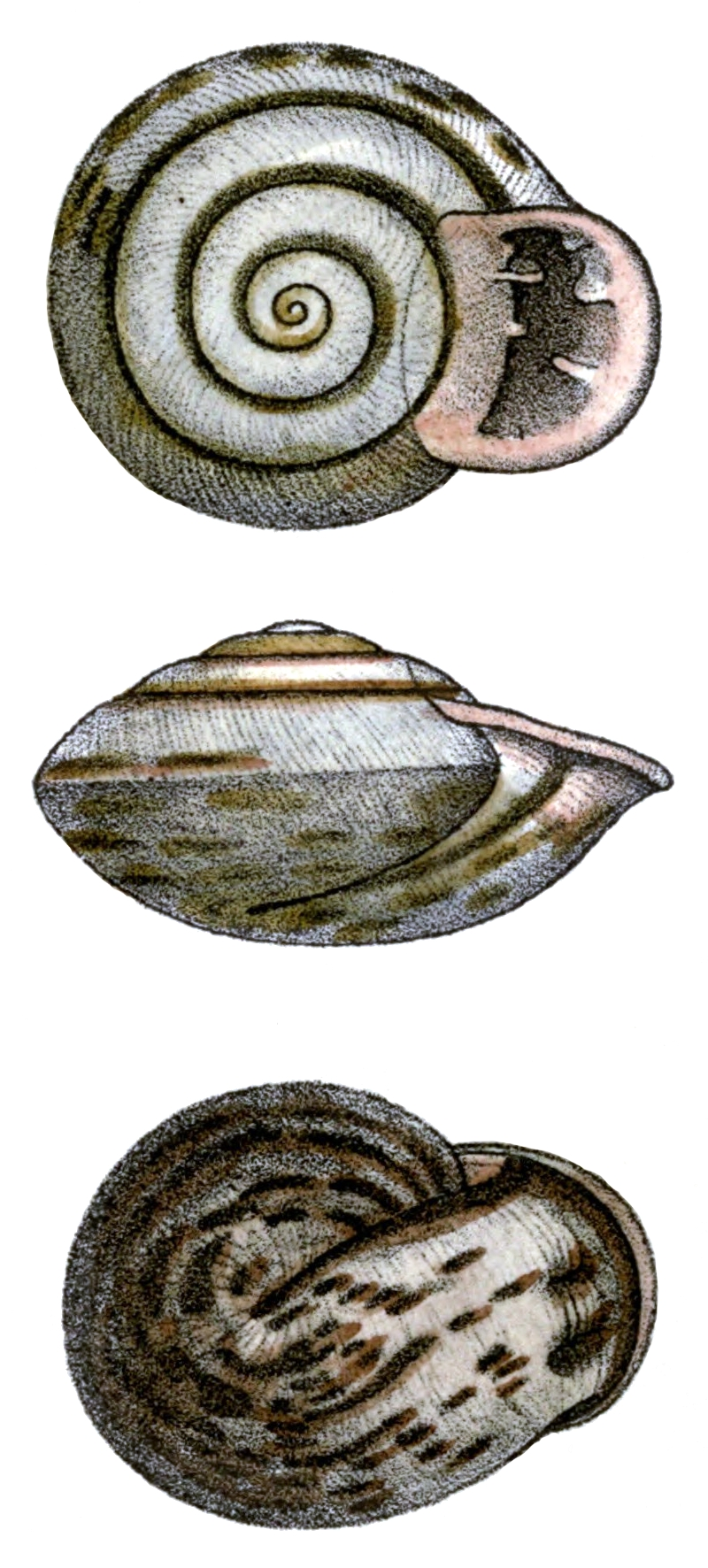
- A colored drawing of an adult shell of Anostoma depressum

Scientific classification
- Kingdom: Animalia
- Phylum: Mollusca
- Class: Gastropoda
- Order: Stylommatophora
- Family: Tomogeridae
- Genus: Anostoma
- Species: A. depressum

Binomial name
- Anostoma depressum (Lamarck, 1822)

= Anostoma depressum =

Species of gastropod

Anostoma depressum is a species of air-breathing land snail, a terrestrial pulmonate gastropod mollusc in the family Tomogeridae.

== Distribution ==
This species occurs in Brazil.

== Original description ==
Lamarck originally described Anostoma depressum under name Anostoma depressa as follows: "Coquille suborbiculaire, convexe des deux côtés, un peu déprimée, obtusement carénée, imperforée, glabre; blanchâtre avec une ligne circulaire rougeâtre au-dessus; ouverture à cinq dents; lèvre fortement réfléchie."

Translated from French language: "Shell suborbicular, convex on both sides, a little depressed, obtusely carinated, imperforate, glabrous; whitish with a circular reddish line above; aperture five toothed; lip strongly reflexed."

== Shell description ==
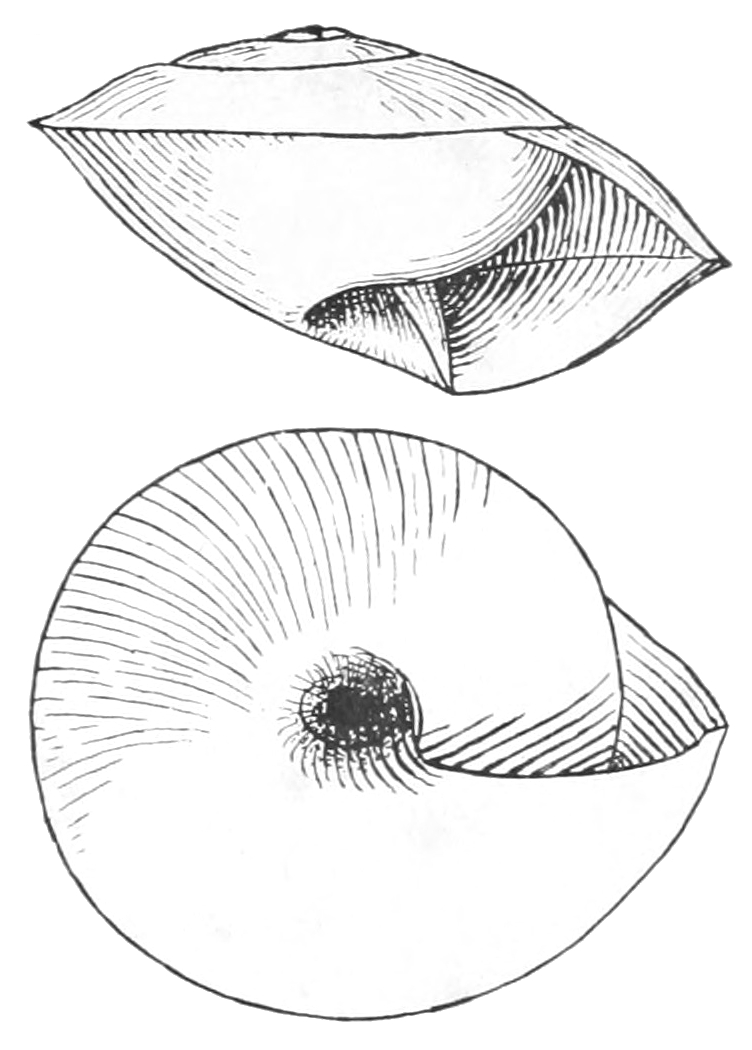
Drawing of juvenile shell of Anostoma depressum.

The shell of this species is biconvex, the altitude about half the diameter, angular at the periphery, whitish, more or less brown-tinted, the base dappled with oblong spots or streaks arranged concentrically, having a dark band along the basal suture, the upper surface sparsely spotted near the periphery, and having a brown band revolving below the suture, usually with a fainter one above it. Surface is finely striate above and below, fresh specimens showing dense fine spiral lines, especially on the last whorl. The shell is composed of 4 whorls, that are nearly flat. The last whorl is angular or carinated at the periphery, its last half is straightened and turned upward, showing two or three grooves or pits behind the lip.

The shell aperture is subhorizontal, semicircular, obstructed by 5 or 6 teeth. Peristome is expanded and reflexed, pinkish-brown or flesh tinted. Parietal margin is bearing two or three teeth; a minute tubercular angle-lamella is often obsolete, an erect, compressed parietal lamella, and a small infraparietal lamella at about the middle of the parietal margin. Outer margin with three (or four) folds; columellar fold usually wanting; upper and lower palatal folds well developed, the former a little larger and more oblique; suprapalatal fold tubercular, small or minute.

The width of adult shells is 31–37 mm, the height is 15-17.5 mm.

The immature shell measures 21 by 18 mm in width, the height is 10.5 mm. The axis is hollow and the mouth possesses no lamellae.

Distinguished from Anostoma octodentatum chiefly by the narrower and tinted lip, and fewer teeth. It is usually smaller, more angular at the periphery, and less densely mottled beneath.

== Anatomy ==
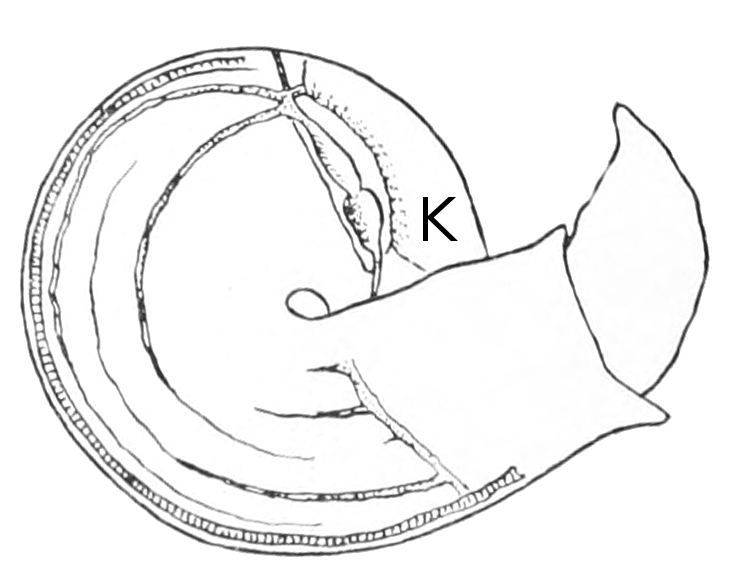
Drawing of anatomy of Anostoma depressum viewed from underside of spire with shell removed. K = kidney.

Anatomy of Anostoma depressum was examined by Harold Heath in 1914.

The kidney, placed between the pericardial and body walls on the anterior face of the last fold, presents the usual sac-like appearance. Evidently the reno-pericardial opening is minute. The ureter, likewise, is difficult to trace throughout a portion of its course. Its external opening is immediately behind that of the alimentary canal, and from this point is readily followed to the region of the pericardium, where it decreases in caliber and passes into a network of blood vessels. It appears that the kidney is in contact, along its inner face, with a slender sack or tube with which the ureter communicates.

There are no special features of the digestive system of Anostoma depressum.

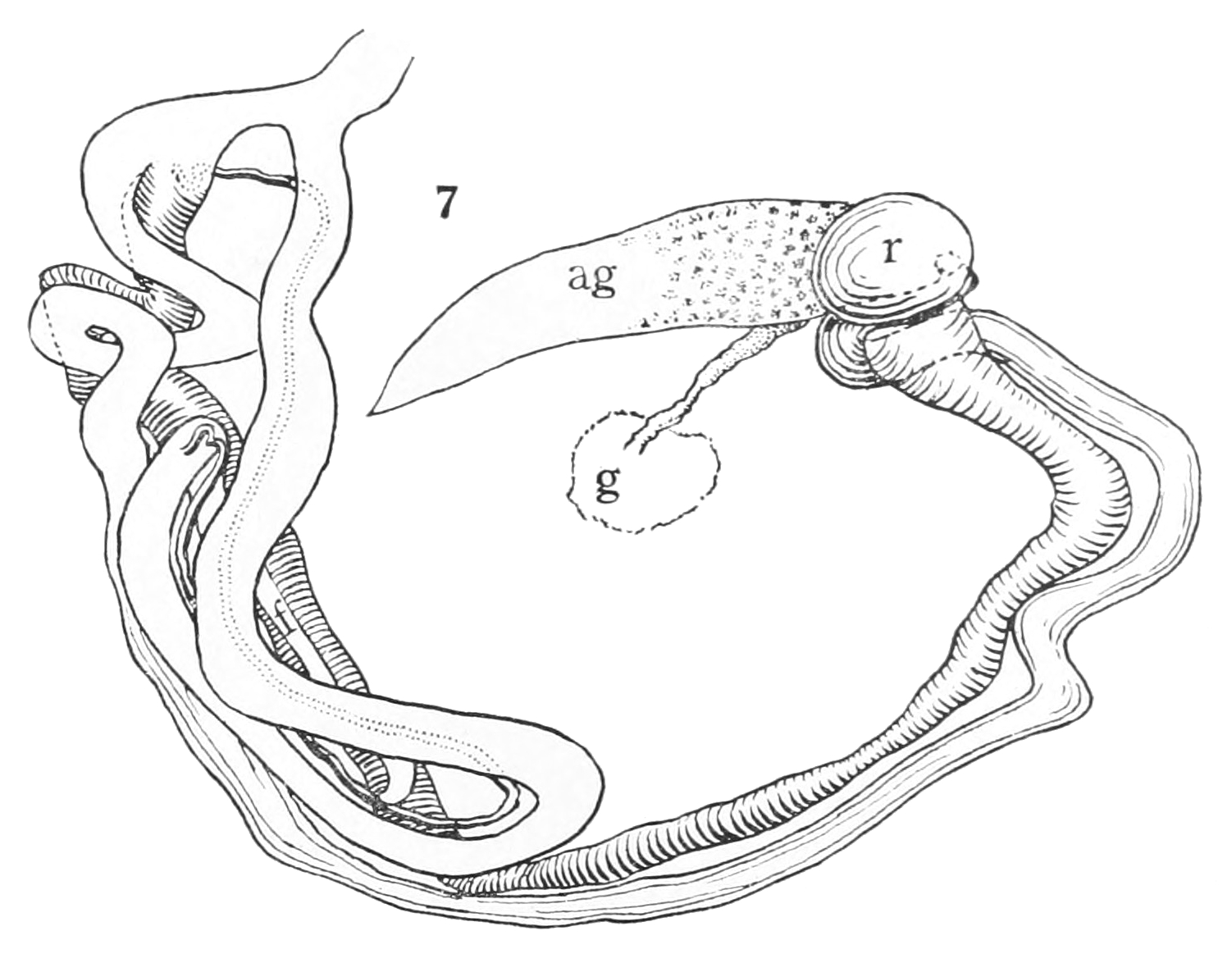
Drawing of reproductive system of Anostoma depressum viewed from apex of spire. ag. - accessory glands f - flagellum g - gonad r - seminal receptacle.

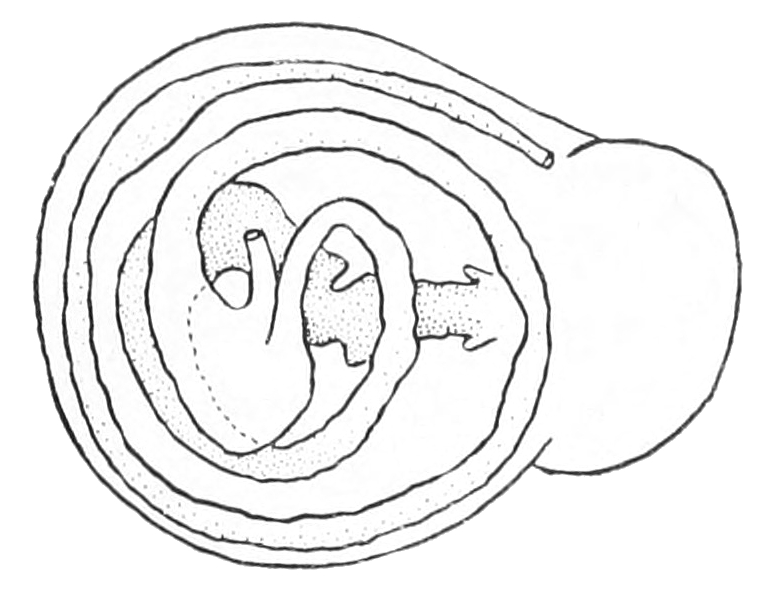
Drawing of digestive tract of Anostoma depressum viewed from apex of spire.

The description of the reproductive system of Ringicella ringens as described by Fischer (1869) applies in all essential details to Anostoma depressum with the exception of a penis retractor muscle attached to the vas deferens. In Anostoma depressum the external reproductive pore, located on the right side of the head, leads into a small atrium with which the penis, hermaphroditic duct, and seminal receptacle attach. The first named is a heavy, muscular organ, accompanied by the usual slender vas deferens, their union being effected at some distance from the distal end of the penis, which thus forms a flagellum. The penis and flagellum are both sharply defined and appear to be without muscular attachments, though bound to the body wall by delicate connective tissue strands. In the neighborhood of the outer opening, however, the penis sheath affords attachment for three or four slender muscle bands that Heath inclined to regard as penis retractors. The hermaphroditic duct, a highly glandular duct of comparatively even diameter, traverses the greater portion of the first coil of the body to enter the accessory glands. All of these structures are in a quiescent condition, and in size and configuration probably fall far short of their fully developed state in the sexually mature condition. The same is likewise true of the gonad. While the duct leading to it from the accessory glands is clearly apparent throughout the first part of its course, it gradually approaches the vanishing point, and cannot with certainty be traced to a gonad, which is accordingly drawn in its hypothetical position.

== Feeding habits ==
Anostoma depressum is phytophagous feeding on vegetables and moss.
