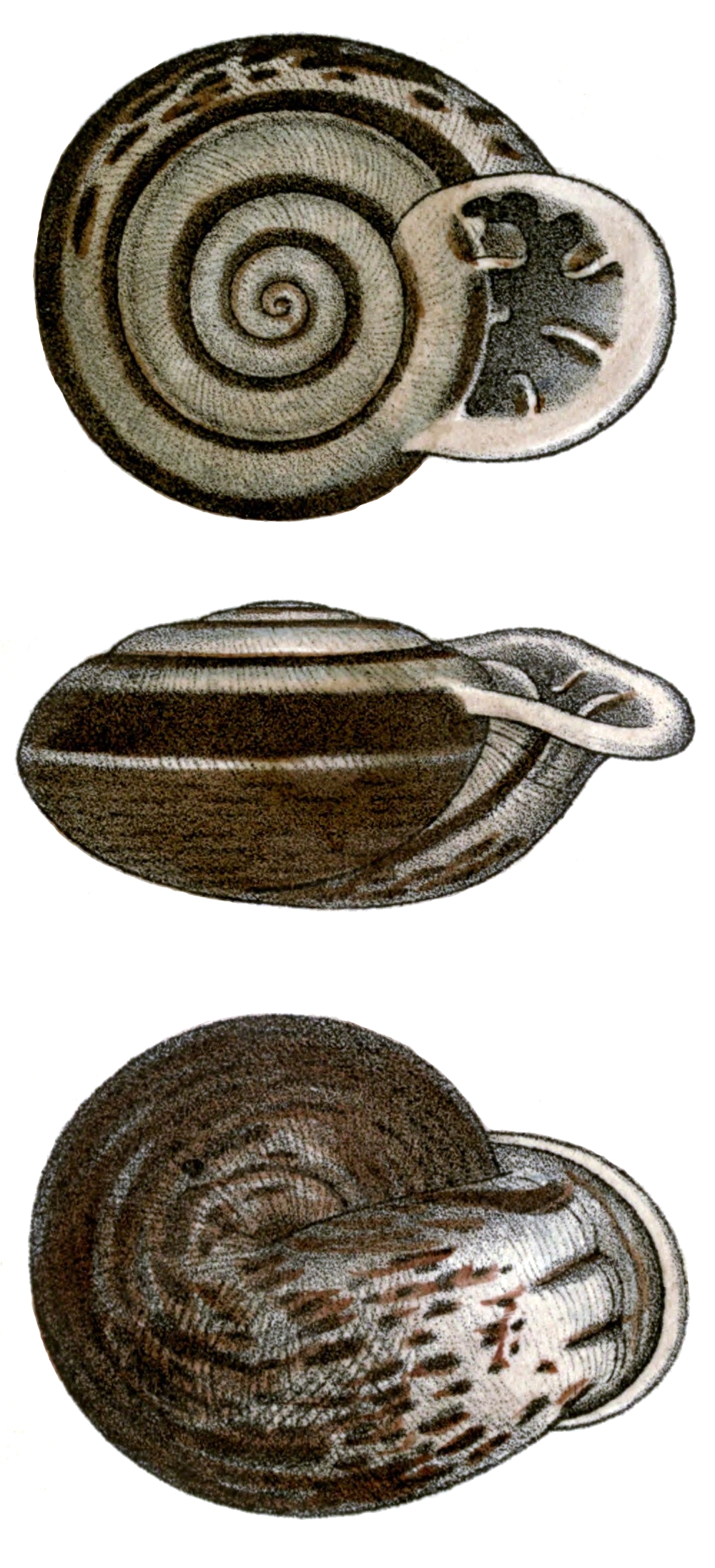
- A colored drawing of an adult shell of Anostoma octodentatum

Scientific classification
- Kingdom: Animalia
- Phylum: Mollusca
- Class: Gastropoda
- Order: Stylommatophora
- Suborder: Helicina
- Superfamily: Orthalicoidea
- Family: Tomogeridae
- Genus: Anostoma; Fischer von Waldheim, 1807

Synonyms
- Also note that this genus name has frequently been misspelled as "Anastoma": Angystoma Schumacher, 1817; Anostoma (Anostoma) Fischer von Waldheim, 1807· accepted, alternate representation; Anostoma (Ringicella) Gray, 1847· accepted, alternate representation; Tomogeres Montfort, 1810; Tomogeres (Ringicella) J. E. Gray, 1847 superseded combination; Tomogerina Jousseaume, 1877

= Anostoma =

Genus of gastropods

Anostoma, common name the up-mouth snails, is a genus of tropical air-breathing land snails, terrestrial pulmonate gastropod mollusks in the family Tomogeridae.

Snails in this genus are found in Brazil.

Adult snails in this genus have an extremely unusual shell morphology: the aperture of the adult shell faces directly "upwards", in other words, in the same direction as the spire. This seemingly impossible arrangement is made possible because the adult shell is carried upside down.

In 1901, the American malacologist Henry Augustus Pilsbry commented that the adult shell of Anostoma is "so bizarre that in the total absence of information upon its life history, no useful theory can be formulated to account for its peculiarities."

A very similar shell is found in the genus Ringicella Gray, 1847, which was previously considered to be merely a subgenus within Anostoma.

== How the shell is carried ==
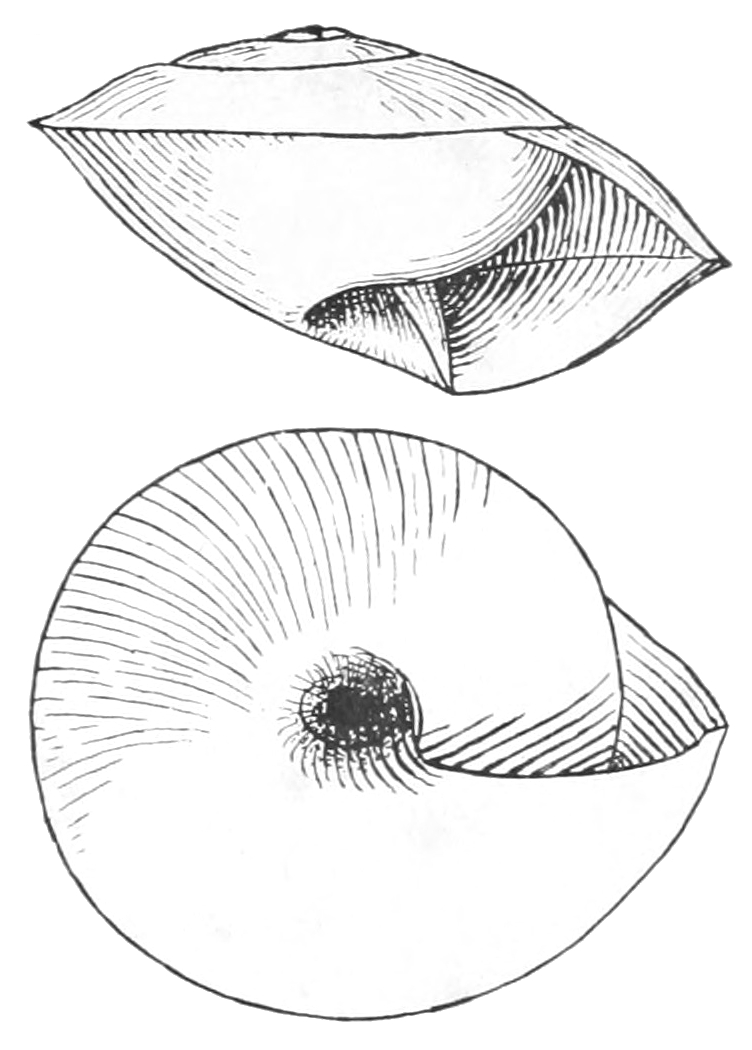
Drawing of juvenile shell of Anostoma depressum.

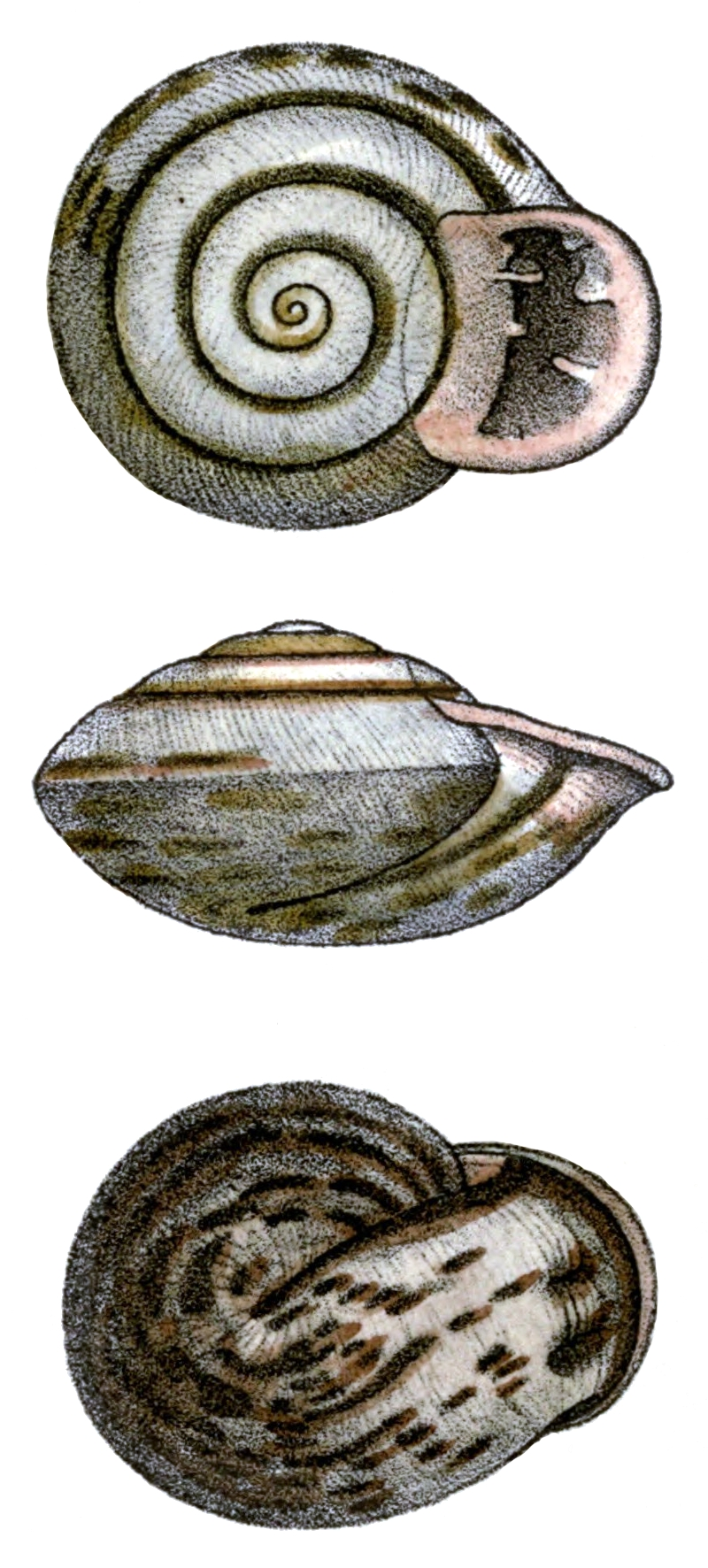
A colored drawing of an adult shell of Anostoma depressum

This is one of the most peculiar genera of land snails. The prominent feature of an upturned aperture (causing the adult snail to carry the shell spire down) is reflected in its scientific name Anostoma: ano, means up, or backwards, and stoma means mouth, from the Greek.

In this genus, the adult snails carry the shell completely upside down, with the umbilicus uppermost, and the spire facing downwards. To make this extraordinary feat possible, the mature aperture of the shell is aligned in the same plane as the rather low spire of the shell.

It appears that in juveniles, the shell is carried with the widest diameter vertically aligned, in other words, with the keel of the shell pointing up.

== Shell description ==
The width of adult shells varies from 23 to 45 mm.

Thomas Wyatt (1838) wrote about Anostoma: "An extraordinary shell, sometimes called the antique lamp from its form. Shell orbicular, the spire convex and obtuse; aperture round, toothed within, grinning, turned upward to the spire; margin reflected."

The shell of Anostoma is heliciform, biconvex, solid, the axis hollow, but imperforate in the adult stage. The shell is composed of few whorls, the last straightened, turning toward the margin and upward.

Before the last half whorl is formed, the shell is umbilicate, and judging by the growth-lines, the juvenile and subadult shell is carried with the equatorial plane nearly vertical. However, as the last half whorl starts to form, the direction of growth changes: it tilts to the right, not to the left as in the Helicidae, and subsequently that half whorl grows up across the base of the shell. The final aperture in the adult is slightly above the keel or widest diameter of the shell.

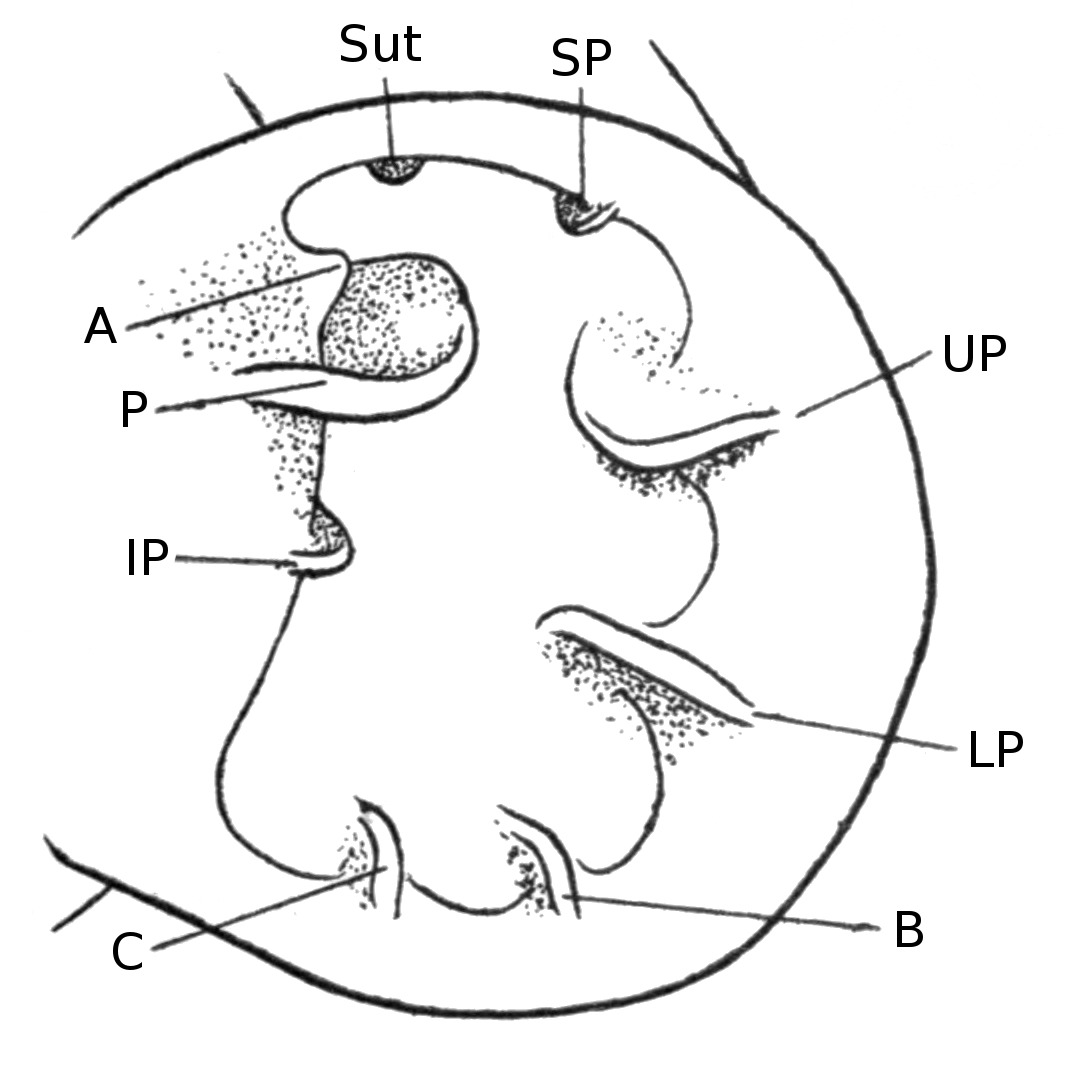
A line drawing of the aperture of an adult shell of Anostoma. Sut = sutural fold SP = suprapalatal fold UP = upper palatal fold LP = lower platal fold B = basal fold C = columellar lamella IP = infraparietal lamella P = parietal lamella A = angular lamella

The apex of the shell is smooth and somewhat flattened. The peristome is expanded and reflexed. The semicircular aperture is turned upward, obstructed by numerous lamellae and folds. In the aperture of Anostoma, the primitive condition of the parietal armature remains, the angular, parietal and infraparietal lamellae being all present and separate. In Anostoma the parietal lamella is the longest while in other Odontostomini the infraparietal lamella is the longest. The "teeth" of the aperture are entirely homologous with those of Odontostomus.

The similar genus Ringicella has an additional feature on its shell: the angular lamella and upper suprapalatal fold are concrescent and form a perforation in the lip at its upper end.

== Anatomy ==
Pilsbry described the anatomy of what is now known as Ringicella ringens. At the time that species was described as an Anostoma, and Pilsbry (who was very thorough) did not make any comments that implied that there was any difference between the anatomy of that species and that of any of the other Anostoma species he examined. Thus, see Ringicella#Anatomy.

Anatomy of Anostoma depressum was examined by Harold Heath in 1914.

== Distribution ==
This genus of snails occurs in Brazil.

== Species ==
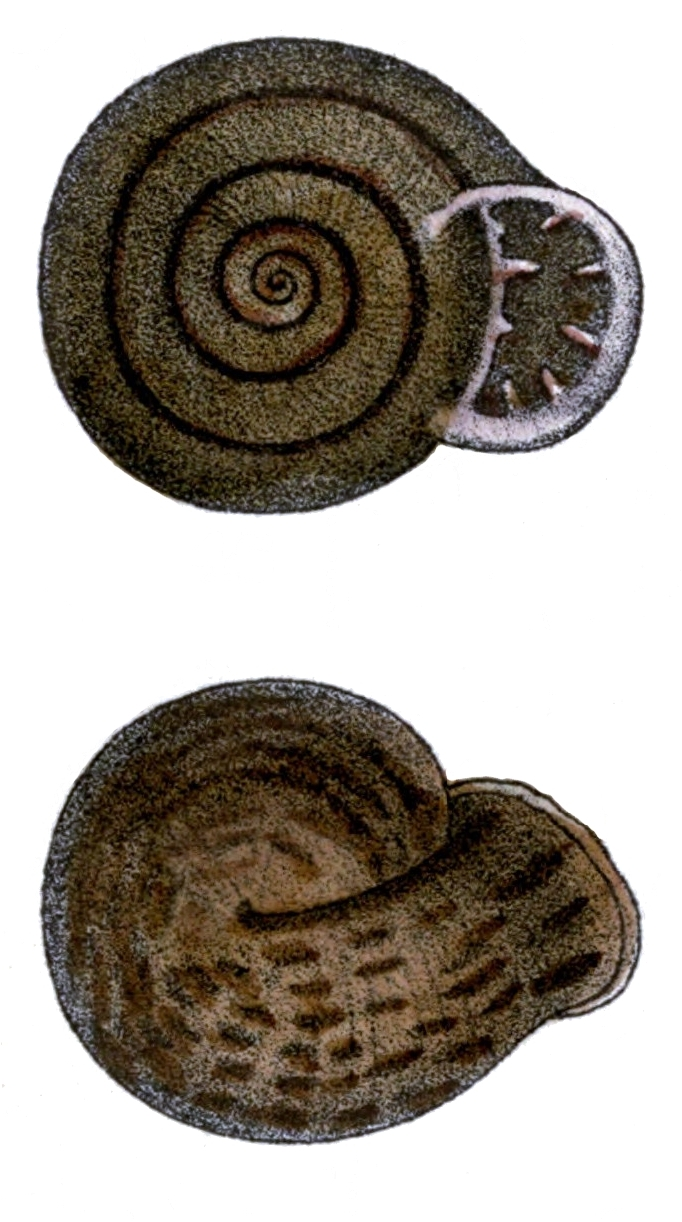
A colored drawing of a shell of Anostoma deshayesianum.

Species within this genus include:

- Anostoma baileyi Solem, 1956
- Anostoma brunneum Verdcourt, 1991
- Anostoma carinatum Pfeiffer, 1853
- Anostoma depressum (Lamarck, 1822)
- Anostoma deshayesianum Fischer, 1857
- Anostoma octodentatum Fischer von Waldheim, 1807 - Brazilian up-mouth snail. This is the type species for the genus. The type locality is tropical South America, east of the Andes.
  - Anostoma octodentatum verreauxianum Hupé, 1857 (photo)
- Anostoma ringens (Linnaeus, 1758)
- Anostoma rossi Weber, 1925
- Anostoma tessa Simone, 2012
- Anostoma verreauxianum Hupé, 1856 (uncertain, status in recent literature not researched by editor)
