= Anostoma baileyi =

Scientific classification
- Kingdom: Animalia
- Phylum: Mollusca
- Class: Gastropoda
- Order: Stylommatophora
- Family: Tomogeridae
- Genus: Anostoma
- Species: A. baileyi

Binomial name
- Anostoma baileyi Solem, 1956

Species of gastropod

Anostoma baileyi is a species of air-breathing land snail, a terrestrial pulmonate gastropod mollusc in the family Tomogeridae.

== Distribution ==
This species occurs in Brazil.

== Shell description ==
The shell has 5-5.25 whorls.

The width of adult shells is 29.6-32.3 mm, the height is 15.1-17.2 mm.

The main differences between the shell of this species and the similar shell of Anostoma rossi are that this shell has no spiral sculpture and the aperture is more elongated.
