= Anostoma brunneum =

Scientific classification
- Kingdom: Animalia
- Phylum: Mollusca
- Class: Gastropoda
- Order: Stylommatophora
- Family: Tomogeridae
- Genus: Anostoma
- Species: A. brunneum

Binomial name
- Anostoma brunneum Verdcourt, 1992

Synonyms
- Anostoma brunneum brunneum Verdcourt, 1991; Anostoma octodentatum brunneum Verdcourt, 1992 ·

Species of gastropod

Anostoma brunneum is a species of air-breathing land snail, a terrestrial pulmonate gastropod mollusc in the family Tomogeridae.

== Distribution ==
This species occurs in Brazil.
