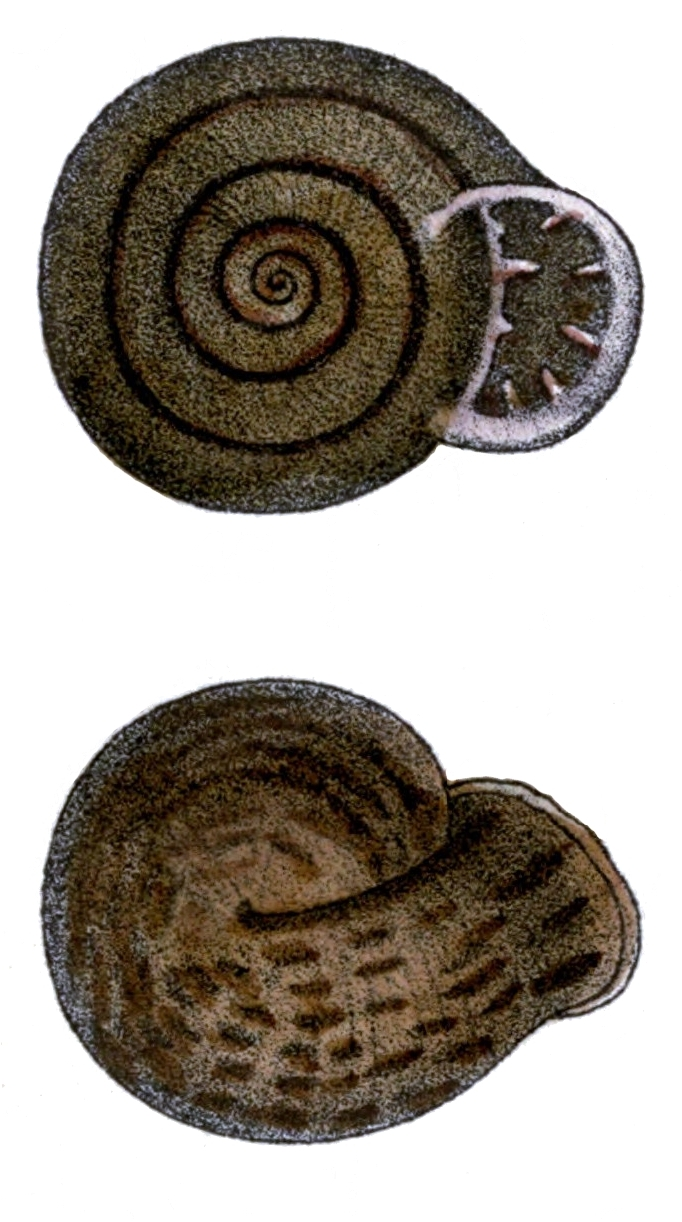
- A colored drawing of an adult shell of Anostoma deshayesianum

Scientific classification
- Kingdom: Animalia
- Phylum: Mollusca
- Class: Gastropoda
- Order: Stylommatophora
- Family: Tomogeridae
- Genus: Anostoma
- Species: A. deshayesianum

Binomial name
- Anostoma deshayesianum Fischer, 1857

= Anostoma deshayesianum =

Species of gastropod

Anostoma deshayesianum is a species of air-breathing land snail, a terrestrial pulmonate gastropod mollusc in the family Tomogeridae.

== Distribution ==
This species occurs in Brazil.

== Shell description ==
The shell of this species is orbiculate-globose, lightly striate, hardly shining, covered with a corneous epidermis. The shell is composed of 5 convex whorls. The spire is obtuse. The suture is hardly impressed, not marginate, bordered below by a blackish band. The last whorl is globose, not carinated, divided by a submedian blackish band above, the upper part having only a few spots near the periphery, the base with numerous brown spots arranged concentrically.

The shell aperture is semilunar and a little oblique. The columellar (parietal) margin is arcuate, convex, and three-toothed. The median tooth is the most strongly developed. The peristome is white, reflexed, and has six equidistant and equal white teeth, which are violet-tinted at their bases.

The width of adult shells is 33 mm, the height is 18 mm.
