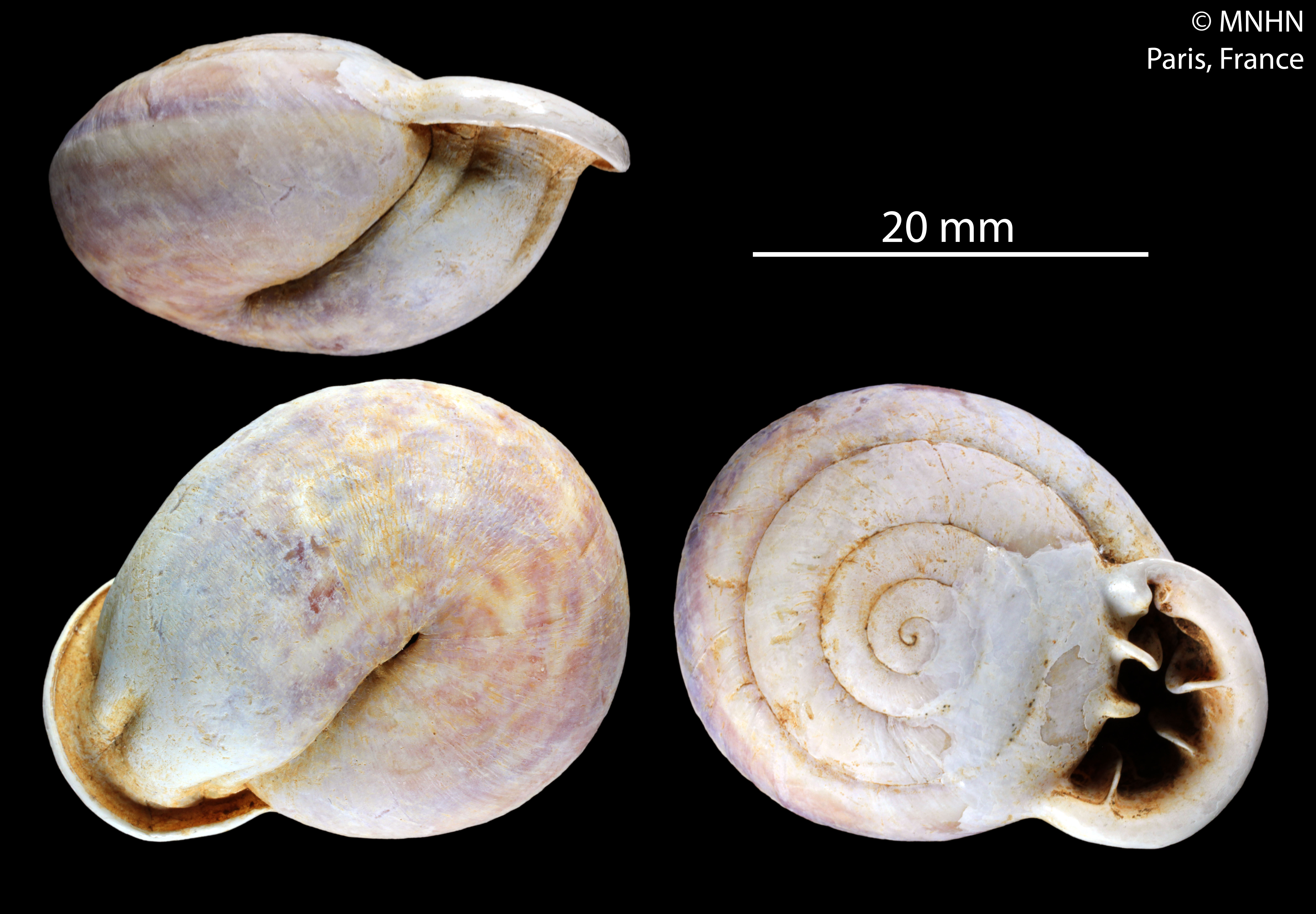
- Shell of Anostoma tessa (paratype at MNHN, Paris)

Scientific classification
- Kingdom: Animalia
- Phylum: Mollusca
- Class: Gastropoda
- Order: Stylommatophora
- Family: Tomogeridae
- Genus: Anostoma
- Species: A. tessa

Binomial name
- Anostoma tessa Simone, 2012

= Anostoma tessa =

Species of gastropod

Anostoma tessa is a species of air-breathing land snail, a terrestrial pulmonate gastropod mollusc in the family Tomogeridae.

== Distribution ==
This species occurs in Bahia state, Brazil.
