= Tomigerus gibberulus =

Conservation status
- Extinct (IUCN 2.3)

Scientific classification
- Kingdom: Animalia
- Phylum: Mollusca
- Class: Gastropoda
- Order: Stylommatophora
- Superfamily: Orthalicoidea
- Family: Tomogeridae
- Genus: Tomigerus
- Species: †T. gibberulus

Binomial name
- †Tomigerus gibberulus (Burrow, 1815)

Synonyms
- Digerus gibberulus (Burrow, 1815); Helix gibberula Burrow, 1815 original combination; Tornigenus gibberulus ssp. digerus Burrow, 1815

Extinct species of gastropod

Tomigerus gibberulus is an extinct species of air-breathing land snail, a terrestrial pulmonate gastropod mollusk in the family Tomogeridae. cf.

This species was endemic to Brazil; it is considered now extinct.
