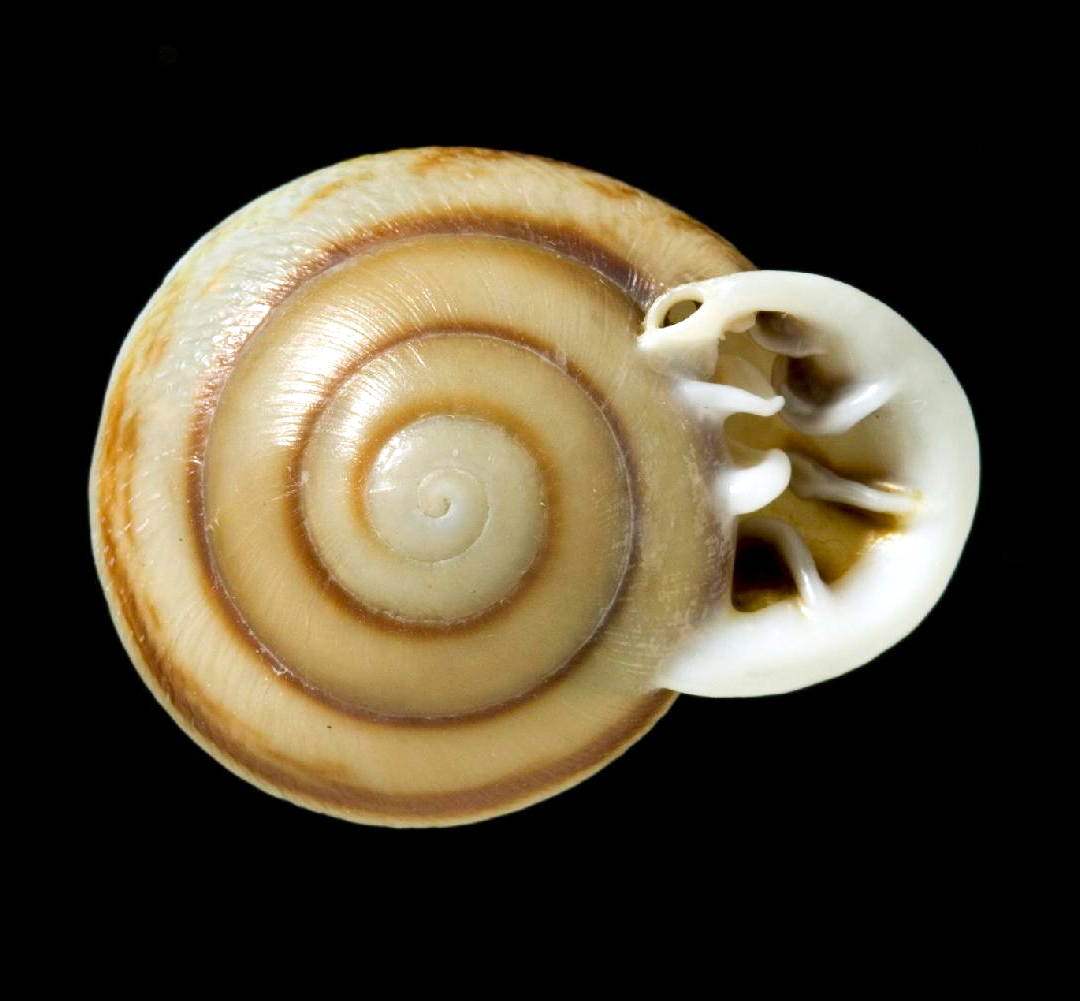
- Syntype of Anostoma carinatum at the Natural History Museum, London

Scientific classification
- Kingdom: Animalia
- Phylum: Mollusca
- Class: Gastropoda
- Order: Stylommatophora
- Family: Tomogeridae
- Genus: Anostoma
- Species: A. carinatum

Binomial name
- Anostoma carinatum L. Pfeiffer, 1853

Synonyms
- Ringicella carinatum (L. Pfeiffer, 1853)

= Anostoma carinatum =

Species of gastropod

Anostoma carinatum is a species of terrestrial gastropod in the family Tomogeridae.

== Description ==
Original description (translated from Latin):

The shell is deeply chinked, conoid-lenticular (shaped like a cone and a lens), and somewhat solid, with a sharp keel. It is pale, with a narrow chestnut band above the keel and at the suture. The spire is a short cone. There are 5 rather flat whorls, the upper ones slightly striated. The body whorl is irregularly and wavy-ribbed and striated, with a convex base marked with chestnut spots, and is pitted anteriorly. The aperture continues the periphery of the spire and is semicircular, constricted by 6 strong, wavy lamellae. The peristome is white, widely expanded, and reflected, with a large, oblong hole on the right margin at the insertion point.

The length of the shell attains 13 mm, its maximum diameter 24.5 mm.

== Distribution ==
This species occurs in Brazil.
