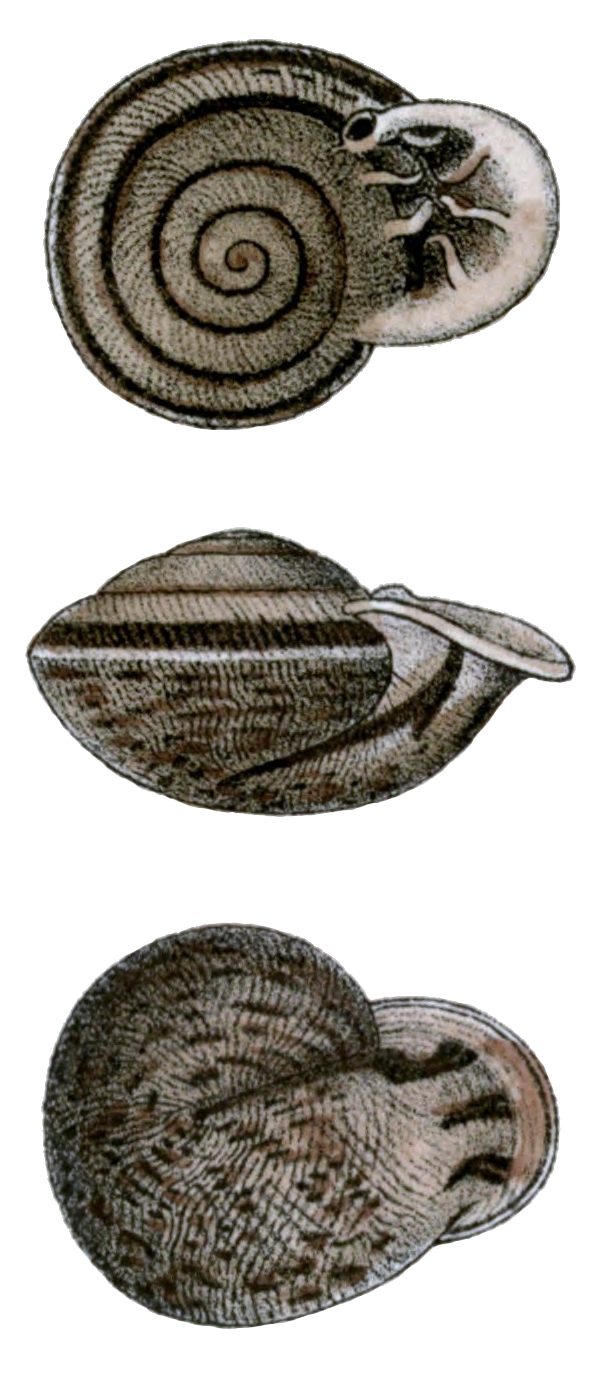
- Shell of Anostoma ringens

Scientific classification
- Kingdom: Animalia
- Phylum: Mollusca
- Class: Gastropoda
- Order: Stylommatophora
- Family: Tomogeridae
- Genus: Anostoma
- Species: A. ringens

Binomial name
- Anostoma ringens (Linnaeus, 1758)

Synonyms
- Angystoma resupinata Schumacher, 1817; Anostoma globulosa Lamarck, 1822; Helix (Helicodonta) ringicula A. Férussac, 1822 junior subjective synonym; Helix ringens Linnaeus, 1758 (original combination)

= Anostoma ringens =

Species of gastropod

Anostoma ringens is a species of air-breathing land snail, a terrestrial pulmonate gastropod mollusc in the family Tomogeridae.

== Description ==
The length of the shell attains 13 mm, its maximum diameter 24.5 mm.

(Original description in Latin of Anostoma globulosa) The shell is subglobose (almost spherical), with an obsolete keel. It is imperforate (lacking an umbilicus), smooth, and whitish. All the whorls are distinguished by a red line. The aperture is six-toothed. The lip has a reflected margin and is equipped with a sinus (a curve or recess).

== Distribution ==
This species occurs in Brazil.
