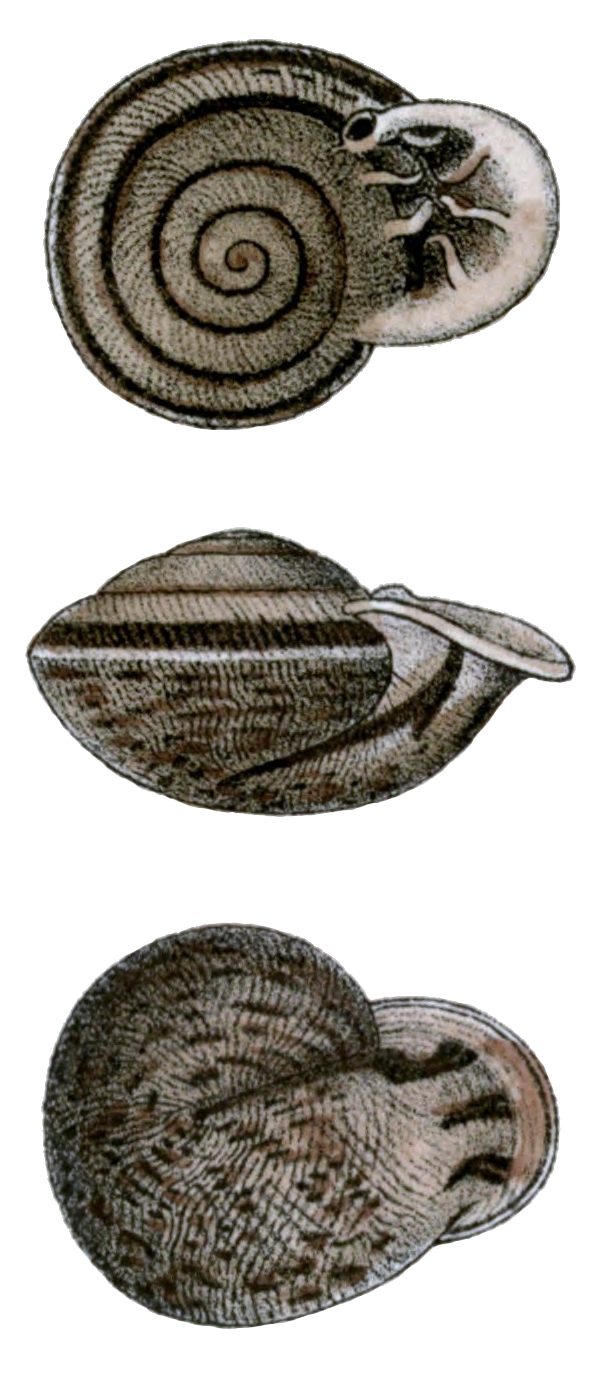
- A colored drawing of an adult shell of Ringicella ringens

Scientific classification
- Kingdom: Animalia
- Phylum: Mollusca
- Class: Gastropoda
- Order: Stylommatophora
- Family: Tomogeridae
- Genus: Ringicella
- Species: R. ringens

Binomial name
- Ringicella ringens (Linnaeus, 1758)

Synonyms
- Anostoma globulosa Lamarck, 1822; Anostoma globulosum Lamarck, 1822

= Ringicella ringens =

Species of gastropod

Ringicella ringens is a species of air-breathing land snail, a terrestrial pulmonate gastropod mollusk in the family Tomogeridae.

It is considered a synonym of Anostoma ringens (Linnaeus, 1758)

== Distribution ==
This species occurs in Brazil. It lives on the ground.

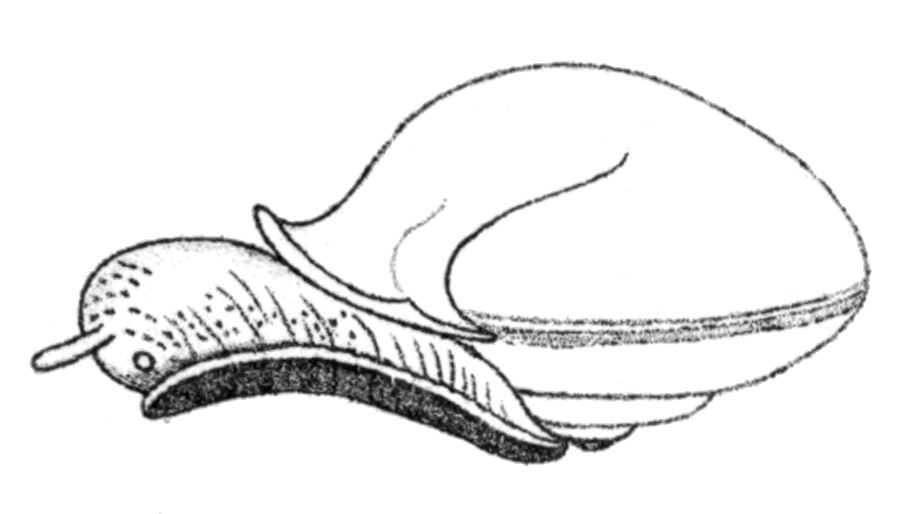
A drawing of a preserved specimen of Ringicella ringens showing how the snail carries the shell with the spire pointing downwards.

== Shell description ==
Thomas Wyatt (1838) wrote about the shell of this species (as Anostoma globulosa): "Globose, with two small punctures, one on each side of the lip; slightly carinated, smooth, and white; margin reflected."

The shell of this species is biconvex and solid. It is brownish-yellow in color, with a dark-brown band above the periphery, and another bordering the suture. The base of the shell is rather sparsely marked with irregular reddish-brown spots and usually has a dark stripe below the basal suture. The surface of the shell is only very slightly shiny. The last whorl is densely corrugated in a zigzag pattern, but sometimes this sculpture is almost obsolete. The shell has 4 whorls. The final whorl is carinated at the periphery, and has three deep, dark-colored grooves, as well as one small one behind the lip.

The aperture of the shell is subhorizontal. It is elevated above the periphery of the shell and is obstructed by six white teeth. There are two strong lamellae on the parietal wall; these lamellae are compressed and curve upward within the aperture. The infraparietal lamella is stouter and straight. The outer lip of the peristome is broad, expanded and reflexed. It is white in color, its upper end perforated by an oval hole.

The outer margin of the peristome has four long folds within it, of which the columellar and the lower and upper palatal are subequal, the inner end of the latter being strongly bent upward. The suprapalatal fold is smaller and oblique, almost transverse. Above it is a small upper superpalatal fold, which has united with the angle-lamella to form the wall of the respiratory foramen, perforating the end of the lip.

The width of adult shells is 18–25 mm, the height is 10.5–13 mm.
