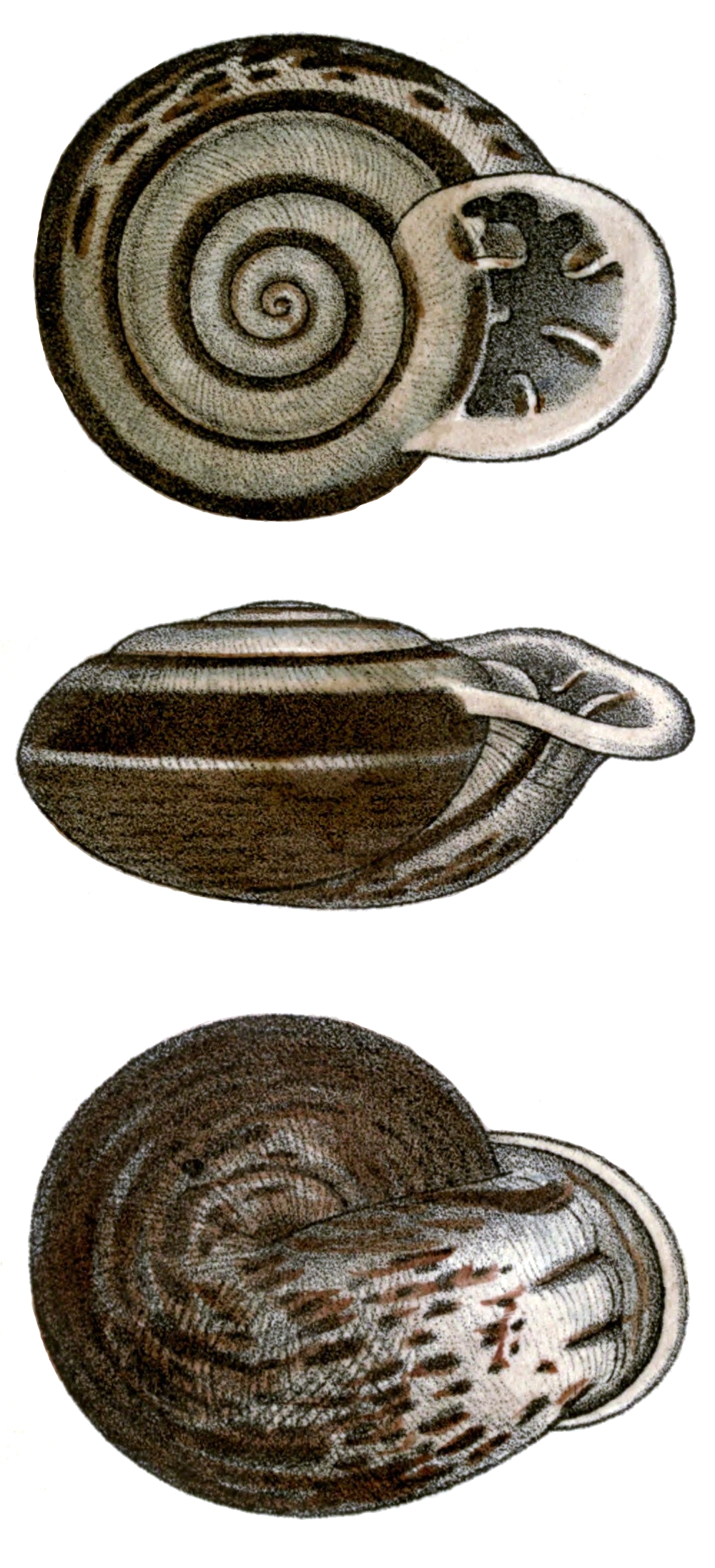
- A colored drawing of an adult shell of Anostoma octodentatum

Scientific classification
- Kingdom: Animalia
- Phylum: Mollusca
- Class: Gastropoda
- Order: Stylommatophora
- Family: Tomogeridae
- Genus: Anostoma
- Species: A. octodentatum

Binomial name
- Anostoma octodentatum Fischer von Waldheim, 1807

= Anostoma octodentatum =

Species of gastropod

Anostoma octodentatum, common name Brazilian up-mouth snail, is a species of air-breathing land snail, a terrestrial pulmonate gastropod mollusk in the family Tomogeridae.

Anostoma octodentatum is the type species of the genus Anostoma. The type locality is tropical South America, east of the Andes.

== Subspecies ==
- Anostoma octodentatum verreauxianum Hupé, 1857 (photo)

== Distribution and habitat ==
This species occurs in Brazil in the states of Ceará and Amapá, where it is found uncommonly, living on the ground.

== Shell description ==
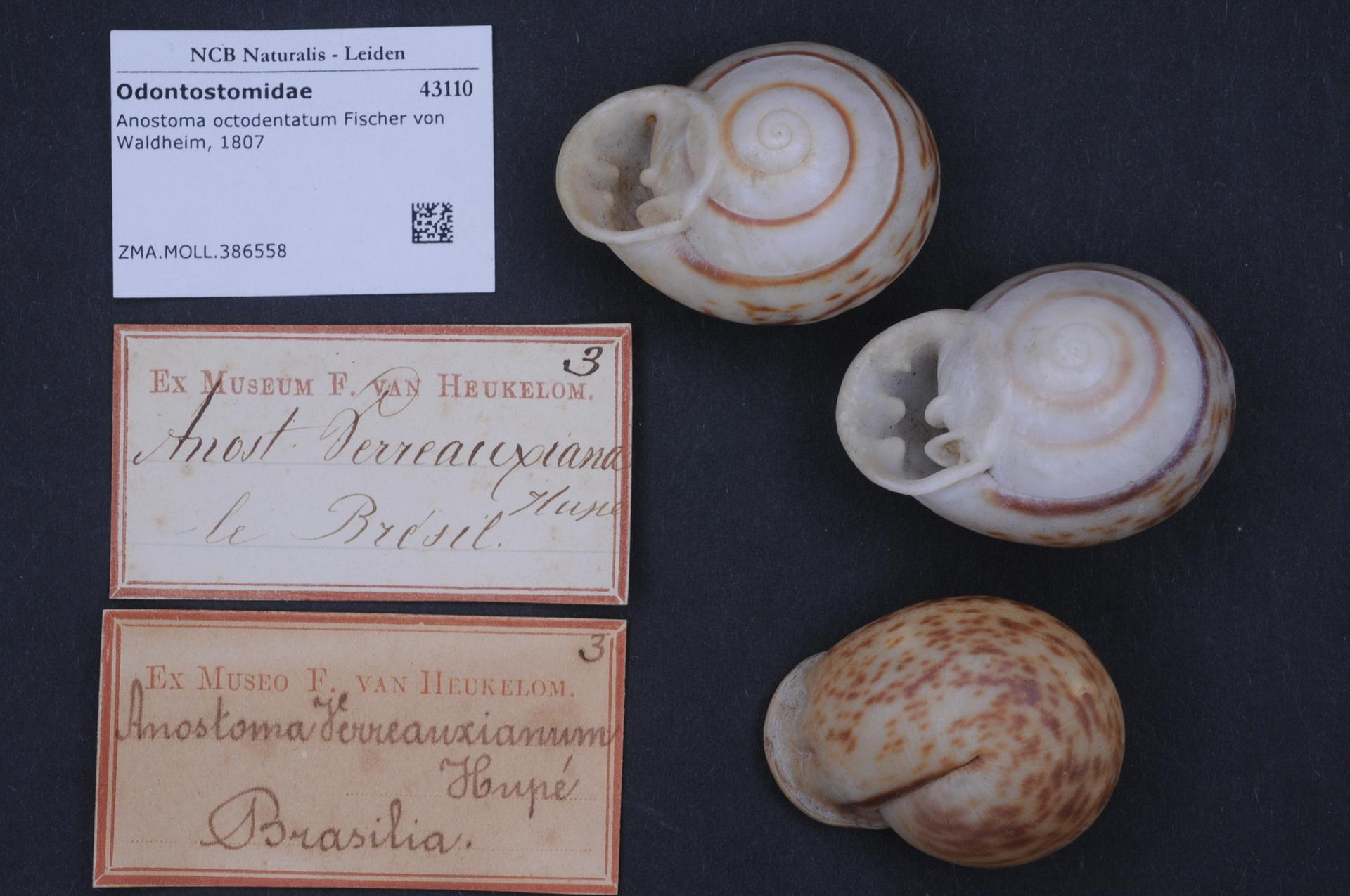
Anostoma octodentatum shells.

The shell of this species is biconvex. The height of the shell is half or nearly half of the greatest diameter. The shell is solid, and obtusely angular at the periphery.

The shell color is a brown-tinted whitish; the base is copiously dappled with oblong spots, and more or less spirally clouded with dull reddish brown. The upper surface has a broad reddish-brown band above the periphery. This band is often mottled, and fades out at its upper edge. There is a narrow dark spiral band bordering the suture below, fading on the two earlier whorls. The surface is slightly striate above, and on the first half of the base. The last half whorl is regularly latticed or malleate in a diamond pattern.

The shell has 5 whorls; the first one is flattened. The last half-whorl is straightened out: it runs to the periphery and is then upturned. It has three long and one short groove behind the lip.

The aperture of the shell is subhorizontal, rounded, and obstructed by eight folds. The peristome is white, very broadly expanded, reflexed and recurved, rather thick, and arcuate throughout. The parietal callus is translucent-white, and spreads broadly upon the last and preceding whorls. The parietal margin bears three lamellae: a small, triangular angle-lamella, a large, erect parietal lamella, the inner end of which curves behind the preceding tooth, and a smaller, straight infraparietal lamella near the middle of the parietal margin. The outer lip bears five folds: subequal, straight and rather large upper and lower palatal folds within the outer margin, a somewhat smaller columellar lamella below them, and two still smaller suprapalatal folds on the upper margin, the upper one of which is smaller and tuberculiform.

The width of the adult shell varies from 39 to 45 mm, the height from 20–21 mm.
