= Megalobulimus grandis =

Conservation status
- Critically Endangered (IUCN 2.3)

Scientific classification
- Kingdom: Animalia
- Phylum: Mollusca
- Class: Gastropoda
- Order: Stylommatophora
- Family: Strophocheilidae
- Genus: Megalobulimus
- Species: M. grandis

Binomial name
- Megalobulimus grandis Martens, 1885

Species of gastropod

Megalobulimus grandis, also known as the Brazilian land snail, is a species of air-breathing land snail, a terrestrial gastropod mollusk in the family Strophocheilidae. This species is endemic to Brazil.
