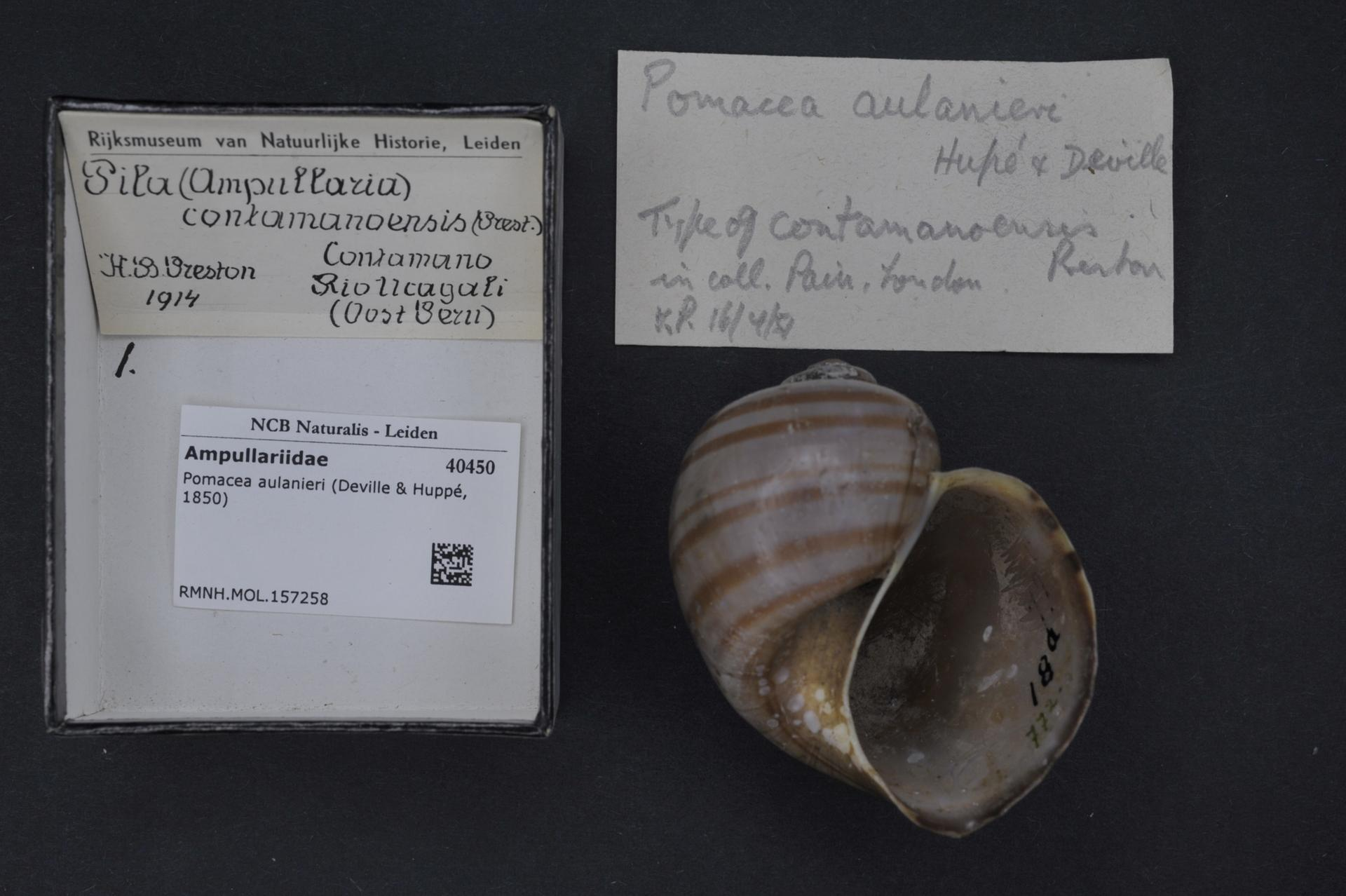

Scientific classification
- Kingdom: Animalia
- Phylum: Mollusca
- Class: Gastropoda
- Subclass: Caenogastropoda
- Order: Architaenioglossa
- Family: Ampullariidae
- Genus: Pomacea
- Species: P. aulanieri

Binomial name
- Pomacea aulanieri (Deville & Hupé, 1850)

Synonyms
- Ampullaria aulanieri Deville & Hupé, 1850; Ampullaria contamanoensis Preston, 1914; Pomacea (Pomacea) aulanieri (Deville & Hupé, 1850)

= Pomacea aulanieri =

Species of snail

Pomacea aulanieri is a species of freshwater snail in the Ampullariidae family.

== Description ==
(Original description in French) The ventricose shell is quite thick. It has a very low conical spire, formed by four to five whorls increasing rapidly in size. The first whorls are convex. The body whorl, flattened on top, is provided at its upper parts with an obtuse angle becoming more and more pronounced. The lower part of this body whorl is noticeably attenuated. It is limited by a rounded and oblique keel, formed by the umbilicus. The latter is large, flared into a spiral funnel. The aperture is oval, elongated, attenuated inferiorly into a sort of canal that corresponds to the umbilical keel; the edges are thin, sharp, and marked with purple spots.

This shell is brownish or greenish, with straight transverse bands, blackish, quite numerous. The operculum is horny.

It is remarkable for its large umbilicus, flared into a funnel, limited anteriorly by an obtuse keel that provides a sort of canal at the base of the aperture.

== Distribution ==
This species is native to Peru. The species eats through grazing.
