= Anostoma rossi =

Scientific classification
- Kingdom: Animalia
- Phylum: Mollusca
- Class: Gastropoda
- Order: Stylommatophora
- Family: Tomogeridae
- Genus: Anostoma
- Species: A. rossi

Binomial name
- Anostoma rossi Weber, 1925

Synonyms
- Anostoma luetzelburgi A. Weber, 1925; Anostoma (Anostoma) luetzelburgi Lange de Morretes 1949; Ringicella luetzelburgi Salgado & Coelho 2003

Species of gastropod

Anostoma rossi is a species of air-breathing land snail, a terrestrial pulmonate gastropod mollusc in the family Tomogeridae.

== Distribution ==
This species occurs in Brazil.
