= Odontostomus =

Scientific classification
- Kingdom: Animalia
- Phylum: Mollusca
- Class: Gastropoda
- Order: Stylommatophora
- Family: Odontostomidae
- Genus: Odontostomus; Gray, 1847

Synonyms
- Bulimus (Odontostomus) H. Beck, 1837 superseded combination; Clausilia (Macrodontes) Swainson, 1840 junior subjective synonym; Macrodontes Swainson, 1840 junior subjective synonym; Macrodontopsis Thiele, 1931 junior subjective synonym; Odontostomus (Macrodontes) Swainson, 1840 junior subjective synonym; Odontostomus (Macrodontopsis) Thiele, 1931; Odontostomus (Odontostomus) H. Beck, 1837 alternative representation

Genus of gastropods

Odontostomus is a genus of air-breathing land snail, a terrestrial pulmonate gastropod mollusk in the family Odontostomidae.

Odontostomus is the type genus for the tribe Odontostomini.

== Distribution ==
This genus of snails occurs in Brazil.

== Species ==
Species in the genus Odontostomus include:

- Odontostomus dautzenbergianus Pilsbry, 1898
- Odontostomus degeneratus Pilsbry, 1899
- Odontostomus fasciatus (Pfeiffer, 1869)
- Odontostomus gargantua (Rang, 1831)
- Odontostomus grayanus (Pfeiffer, 1845)
- Odontostomus koenigswaldi (Thiele, 1906)
- Odontostomus kuhnholtzianus (Crosse, 1870)
- Odontostomus odontostoma (Sowerby, 1824)
- Odontostomus paulista Pilsbry & Ihering, 1898
- Odontostomus sexdentatus (Spix, 1827)
- Odontostomus simplex (Thiele, 1906)
- Odontostomus tenuisculptus J. J. Parodiz, 1963

Synonyms

- Odontostomus gemellatus Ancey, 1901: synonym of Cyclodontina gemellata (Ancey, 1901) (superseded combination)
- Odontostomus leucotremus (Beck, 1837): synonym of Burringtonia leucotrema (Beck, 1837)
- Odontostomus squarrosus Ancey, 1904: synonym of Cyclodontina squarrosa (Ancey, 1904) (unaccepted > superseded combination)
- Odontostomus thielei (Pilsbry, 1930): synonym of Odontostomus gargantua (A. Férussac, 1821)
