= List of non-marine molluscs of Brazil =

Location of Brazil

The non-marine molluscs of Brazil are a part of the molluscan fauna of Brazil.

There are at least 1,074 native nominal species of non-marine molluscs living in Brazil.

There are at least 956 nominal species of gastropods, which breaks down to about 250 species of freshwater gastropods, and about 700 species of land gastropods (590 species of snails and approximately 110(?) species of slugs), plus at least 117 species of bivalves living in the wild.

There are at least 373 species of freshwater molluscs in Brazil.

The number of native species is at least 1,074 and the number of non-indigenous molluscs in Brazil is, at minimum, 32 species. The most serious invasive alien species in Paraná State are the land snail Achatina fulica and the freshwater snail Melanoides tuberculata.

Numbers of species in Brazil
Freshwater gastropods	About 250
Land gastropods: snails	590
Land gastropods: slugs	110(?)
Gastropods (total)	over 950
Bivalves	at least 117
Molluscs (total)	1107
Non-indigenous gastropods in the wild	? freshwater and ? land
Non-indigenous synantrop gastropods	?
Non-indigenous bivalves in the wild	?
Non-indigenous synantrop bivalves	?
Non-indigenous molluscs (total)	32

In Rio Grande do Sul, 201 species and subspecies of non-marine mollusks were recorded: 156 gastropods (83 land snails + 18 slugs + 55 freshwater snails) and 45 bivalves.

In Santa Catarina, 158 species and subspecies of non-marine mollusk were recorded: 135 gastropods (103 land gastropods + 32 freshwater snails) and 23 bivalves.

== Freshwater gastropods ==
The following list of freshwater gastropods is based on the two southernmost states.

=== Ampullariidae ===
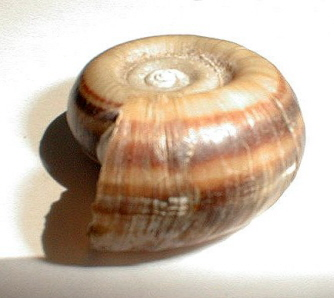
Marisa cornuarietis is a native Brazilian species which is often kept in aquariums in other countries worldwide.

- Pomacea commissionis (Ihering, 1898)
- Asolene petiti (Crosse, 1891)
- Asolene platae (Maton, 1809)
- Asolene spixii (d'Orbigny, 1838)
- Pomacea aldersoni (Pain, 1946)
- Pomacea armeniacum Hupé, 1857
- Pomacea aulanieri (Hupé & Deville, 1850)
- Pomacea amazonica Reeve, 1856
- Pomacea archimedis Spix, 1827
- Pomacea aurostoma (Lea, 1856)
- Pomacea avellana (Sowerby, 1909)
- Pomacea baeri (Dautzenberg, 1902)
- Pomacea bridgesii (Reeve, 1856)
- Pomacea camena Pain, 1949
- Pomacea canaliculata (Lamarck, 1804)
- Pomacea castelnaudii Hupé, 1957
- Pomacea catamarcensis (Sowerby, 1875)
- Pomacea columellaris Gould, 1848
- Pomacea consolatrix (Ihering, 1919)
- Pomacea cousini (Jousseaume, 1887)
- Pomacea curumim Simone, 2004
- Pomacea decussata (Moricand, 1836)
- Pomacea dolioides (Reeve, 1856)
- Pomacea eximia (Dunker, 1853)
- Pomacea expansa (Miller, 1879)
- Pomacea falconensis Pain & Arias, 1958
- Pomacea gevesensis (Deshayes, 1838)
- Pomacea glauca (Linnaeus, 1758)
- Pomacea hanleyana (Alderson, 1926)
- Pomacea haustrum (Reeve, 1856)
- Pomacea hollingsworthi (Pain, 1946)
- Pomacea insularum (d'Orbigny, 1835)
- Pomacea interrupta (Sowerby, 1909)
- Pomacea levior Sowerby, 1909
- Pomacea lineata (Spix, 1827)
- Pomacea maculata Perry, 1810
- Pomacea martinezi (Hidalgo, 1866)
- Pomacea megastoma (Sowerby, 1825)
- Pomacea meta Ihering, 1915
- Pomacea minuscula Baker, 1930
- Pomacea modesta (Busch, 1859)
- Pomacea nais Pain, 1949
- Pomacea nigrilabris Philippi, 1851
- Pomacea nobilis Reeve, 1856
- Pomacea nubila Reeve, 1856
- Pomacea oblonga (Swainson, 1823)
- Pomacea palmeri (Marshall, 1930)
- Pomacea paludosa (Say, 1829)
- Pomacea papyracea Spix, 1827
- Pomacea pealiana (Lea, 1838)
- Pomacea pernambucensis Reeve, 1856
- Pomacea physoides Reeve, 1856
- Pomacea planorbula Philippi, 1851
- Pomacea prunella Hupé, 1857
- Pomacea pulchra Gray, 1834
- Pomacea pomatia (Martens, 1857)
- Pomacea producta Reeve, 1856
- Pomacea puntaplaya (Cousin, 1887)
- Pomacea quersina Spix, 1827
- Pomacea quinindensis (Miller, 1879)
- Pomacea reyrei (Cousin, 1887)
- Pomacea scalaris Orbigny, 1835
- Pomacea semitecta (Mousson, 1873)
- Pomacea semperi (Kobelt, 1914)
- Pomacea sordida Swainson, 1823
- Pomacea superba (Marshall, 1926)
- Pomacea urceus (Müller, 1774)
- Pomacea swainsoni (Philippi, 1852)
- Pomacea tenuissima (Jousseaume, 1894)
- Pomacea vexillum (Reeve, 1856)
- Pomacea yatesii Reeve, 1856
- Pomacea zischkai Blume & Pain, 1952
- Pomacea zonata Spix, 1827
- Pomella americanista (Ihering, 1919)
- Felipponea elongata (Dall, 1921)
- Felipponea iheringi (Pilsbry, 1933)
- Felipponea neritiformis Dall, 1919
- Marisa cornuarietis (Linnaeus, 1758)

=== Pleuroceridae ===
- Doryssa schuppi (Ihering, 1902)

=== Cochliopidae ===
- Atomicus inopinatus Simone & Rolán, 2021
- Heleobia apua Simone & Rolán, 2021
- Heleobia australis (d'Orbigny, 1835)
- Heleobia bertoniana Pilsbry, 1911
- Heleobia brucutu Simone & Oliveira, 2021
- Heleobia charruana d'Orbigny, 1843
- Heleobia cuzcoensis (Pilsbry, 1911)
- Heleobia davisi (Silva & Thomé, 1985)
- Heleobia iguassu Simone, 2021
- Heleobia nana Marcus & Marcus, 1963
- Heleobia parchappii (d'Orbigny, 1835)
- Heleobia piscium (d'Orbigny, 1835) – synonyms: Littoridina (= Heleobia) piscium (= australis) (d'Orbigny, 1835)
- Heleobia pukua Simone & Rolán, 2021
- Heleobia robusta Silva & Veitenheimer-Mendes, 2004

=== Tateidae ===
- Potamolithus catharinae Pilsbry, 1911
- Potamolithus jacuhyensis Pilsbry, 1899
- Potamolithus mirim Simone, 2021
- Potamolithus phillippianus Pilsbry, 1911
- Potamolithus ribeirensis Pilsbry, 1911
- Potamolithus troglobius

=== Pomatiopsidae ===
- Idiopyrgus souleyetianus Pilsbry, 1911
- Spiripockia punctata Simone, 2012

=== Thiaridae ===
- Melanoides tuberculata (Müller, 1774)

=== Planorbidae ===
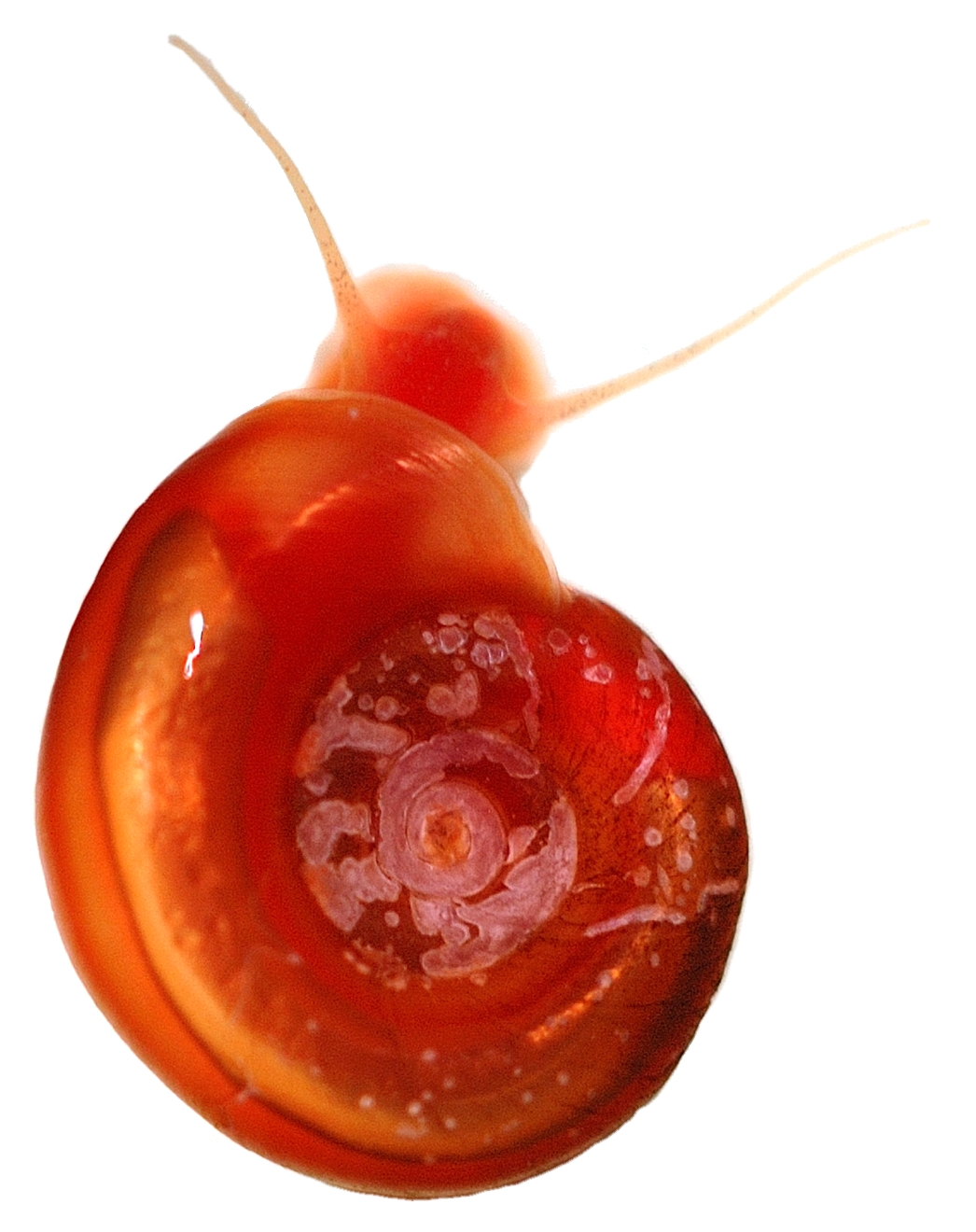
Biomphalaria glabrata is a medically important species, because it is a host for the parasite Schistosoma mansoni.

- Anisancylus dutrae (Santos, 1994) – synonym: Gundlachia dutrae
- Anisancylus obliquus (Broderip & Sowerby, 1832)
- Burnupia ingae Lanzer, 1991
- Ferrissia gentilis Lanzer, 1991
- Gundlachia ticaga (Marcus & Marcus, 1962)
- Hebetancylus moricandi (d'Orbigny, 1837) – synonym: Gundlachia moricandi
- Laevapex vazi Santos, 1989
- Uncancylus concentricus (d'Orbigny, 1835) – synonym: Gundlachia concentrica
- Antillorbis nordestensis (Lucena, 1954)
- Biomphalaria cousini
- Biomphalaria glabrata (Say, 1818)
- Biomphalaria occidentalis Paraense, 1981
- Biomphalaria oligoza Paraense, 1975
- Biomphalaria peregrina (d'Orbigny, 1835)
- Biomphalaria schrammi (Crosse, 1864)
- Biomphalaria tenagophila (d'Orbigny, 1835)
  - Subspecies:
  - B. t. tenagophila (d'Orbigny, 1835)
  - B. t. guaibensis (Paraense, 1984)
- Biomphalaria straminea (Dunker, 1848)
- Acrorbis petricola Odhner, 1937
- Drepanotrema anatinum (d'Orbigny, 1935)
- Drepanotrema cimex (Moricand, 1839)
- Drepanotrema depressissimus (Moricand, 1839)
- Drepanotrema heloicum (d'Orbigny, 1835)
- Drepanotrema kermatoides (d'Orbigny, 1835)
- Drepanotrema lucidum (Pfeiffer, 1839)
- Drepanotrema pfeifferi (Strobel, 1874)

=== Chilinidae ===
- Chilina fluminea (d'Orbigny, 1835)
- Chilina globosa Frauenfeld, 1881
- Chilina megastoma Hylton Scott, 1958
- Chilina parva Martens, 1868
- Chilina rushii Pilsbry, 1896

=== Physidae ===
- Aplexa marmorata (Guilding, 1828) – Aplexa (Stenophysa) marmorata
- Aplexa rivalis (Maton & Rackett, 1807)
- Physa acuta Draparnaud, 1805 – synonym: Physa cubensis

=== Lymnaeidae ===
- Pseudosuccinea columella (Say, 1817)
- Lymnaea rupestris Paraense, 1982
- Lymnaea viatrix (d'Orbigny, 1835)

== Land gastropods ==
The following listing is based on the most up-to-date check list on terrestrial gastropods by Salvador et al (2024).

=== Helicinidae ===
Genus Alcadia Gray, 1840

- Alcadia iheringi Wagner, 1911

Genus Helicina Lamarck, 1799

- Helicina angulata Sowerby, 1842
- Helicina besckei Pfeiffer, 1849
- Helicina biangulata Pfeiffer, 1851
- Helicina bicincta Gloyne, 1872
- Helicina boettgeri Wagner, 1910
- Helicina brasiliensis Gray, 1824
- Helicina caracolla Moricand, 1836
- Helicina carinata d’Orbigny, 1835
- Helicina chionea Pilsbry, 1949
- Helicina concentrica Pfeiffer, 1849
- Helicina densestriata Wagner, 1910
- Helicina fulva d’Orbigny, 1835
- Helicina guajarana Baker, 1914
- Helicina haemastoma Moricand, 1838
- Helicina iguapensis Pilsbry, 1900
- Helicina inaequistriata Pilsbry, 1900
- Helicina juruana Ihering, 1905
- Helicina laterculus Baker, 1914
- Helicina leopoldinae Wagner, 1905
- Helicina leptotropis Wagner, 1910
- Helicina leucozonalis Ancey, 1892
- Helicina lirifera Ancey, 1892
- Helicina lundi Pfeiffer, 1858
- Helicina marfisae Salvador, Silva & Bichuette, 2023
- Helicina oskari Wagner, 1910
- Helicina paraensis Pfeiffer, 1859
- Helicina rotundata Wagner, 1910
- Helicina schereri Baker, 1914
- Helicina siolii Haas, 1949
- Helicina sordida King & Broderip, 1832
- Helicina tilei Pfeiffer, 1847
- Helicina variabilis Wagner, 1827

=== Proserpinidae ===
Genus Proserpina Sowerby II, 1839

- Proserpina derbyi Dall, 1905

=== Diplommatinidae ===
Genus Adelopoma Doering, 1885

- Adelopoma brasiliense Lange de Morretes, 1954
- Adelopoma paraguayana Parodiz, 1944
- Adelopoma paulistanum Martins & Simone, 2014

Genus Habeastrum Simone, 2019

- Habeastrum omphalium Simone, 2019
- Habeastrum parafusum Simone, 2019
- Habeastrum strangei Simone, Cavallari & Salvador,2020

=== Megalomastomatidae ===
Genus Aperostoma Troschel, 1847

- Aperostoma amazonense Bartsch & Morrison, 1942
- Aperostoma blanchetianum (Moricand, 1826)
- Aperostoma currani Bartsch & Morrison, 1942
- Aperostoma fultoni Bartsch & Morrison, 1942
- Aperostoma inca (d’Orbigny, 1835)
- Aperostoma merrilli Bartsch & Morrison, 1942
- Aperostoma pulchellum Bartsch & Morrison, 1942
- Aperostoma redfieldi Bartsch & Morrison, 1942

Genus Cyclopomops Bartsch & Morrison, 1942

- Cyclopomops moricandi (Pfeiffer, 1852)

=== Neocyclotidae ===
Genus Incidostoma Bartsch & Morrison, 1942

- Incidostoma hedui (Bartsch & Morrison, 1942)
- Incidostoma incomptum (Sowerby, 1850)
- Incidostoma tupy Simone, 2004

Genus Incerticyclus Morrison, 1955

- Incerticyclus brasiliensis (Sowerby, 1839)

Genus Neocyclotus Crosse & P. Fischer, 1886

- Neocyclotus agassizi (Bartsch & Morrison, 1942)
- Neocyclotus prominulus (d’Orbigny, 1840)
- Neocyclotus stramineus (Sowerby I, 1843)

=== Vertiginidae (complete) ===
- Gastrocopta iheringi (Suter, 1900)
- Gastrocopta oblonga
- Gastrocopta servilis – subspecies Gastrocopta servilis oblonga (Pfeiffer, 1853)
- Gastrocopta solitaria

=== Pyramidulidae ===
- Pyramidula compacta Suter, 1900

=== Valloniidae (complete) ===
- Vallonia pulchella
- Pupisoma dioscoricola (Adams, 1845)
- Pupisoma minus Pilsbry, 1920
- Strobilops brasiliana

=== Succineidae (complete) ===
- Succinea burmeisteri Döring
- Succinea lopesi Lanzieri, 1966
- Succinea manaosensis Pilsbry, 1926
- Succinea meridionalis d'Orbigny, 1837
- Succinea pusilla Pfeiffer, 1849
- Succinea repanda Pfeiffer, 1854
- Oxyloma beckeri Lanzieri, 1966
- Omalonyx brasiliensis (Simroth, 1896)
- Omalonyx convexus (Martens, 1868)
- Omalonyx unguis (d'Orbigny, 1837)

=== Ellobiidae ===
- Melampus coffeus (Linnaeus, 1758)
- Pedipes mirabilis (Mohlfeld, 1816)

=== Achatinidae ===
- Achatina fulica (Bowdich, 1822)

=== Charopidae (complete) ===
- Radiodiscus bolachaensis Fonseca & Thomé, 1995
- Radiodiscus cuprinus Fonseca & Thomé, 2000
- Radiodiscus iheringi (Ancey, 1899)
- Radiodiscus patagonicus (Suter, 1900)
- Radiodiscus promatensis Miquel, Ramírez & Thomé, 2004
- Radiodiscus thomei Weyrauch, 1965
- Radiodiscus vazi Fonseca & Thomé, 1995
- Radioconus amoenus (Thiele, 1927)
- Radioconus costellifer Hylton-Scott, 1957
- Radioconus goeldi (Thiele, 1927)
- Ptychodon amancaezensis (Hidalgo, 1869)
- Ptychodon liciae (Vaz, 1991)
- Ptychodon janeirensis (Thiele, 1927)
- Ptychodon schuppi (Suter, 1900)
- Rydleya quinquelirata (Smith, 1890)
- Trochogyra gordurasensis (Thiele, 1927)
- Trochogyra leptotera Rochebrune & Mabille, 1882
- Trochogyra pleurophora (Moricand, 1846)
- Trochogyra superba (Thiele, 1927)
- Zilchogyra zulmae Miquel, Ramírez & Thomé, 2004

=== Helicodiscidae (complete) ===
- Zilchogyra clara (Thiele, 1927)
- Zilchogyra deliciosa (Thiele, 1927)
- Zilchogyra paulistana (Hylton-Scott, 1973)
- Lilloiconcha gordurasensis (Thiele, 1927)
- Lilloiconcha tucumana (Hylton-Scott, 1963)
- Helicodiscus thereza Thiele, 1927

=== Punctidae (complete) ===
- Paralaoma servilis (Shuttleworth, 1852)
- Punctum pilsbyi (Hylton-Scott, 1957)

=== Zonitidae (complete) ===
- Oxychilus cellarius (Müller, 1774)
- Oxychilus nitidus (Müller, 1774)
- Oxychilus sublenticularis (Böttger, 1889)
- Zonitoides arboreus (Say, 1816)
- Zonitoides parana Baker, 1914

=== Veronicellidae ===
Genus Angustipes Colosi, 1922

- Angustipes robustus (Colosi, 1922) nomen inquirendum
- Angustipes tarsiai (Coifmann, 1934) nomen inquirendum

Genus Belocaulus Hoffmann, 1925

- Belocaulus angustipes (Heynemann, 1885)
- Belocaulus willibaldoi Ohlweiler, Mota & Gomes, 2009

Genus Diplosolenodes Thomé, 1975

- Diplosolenodes attenuatus (Colosi, 1921) nomen inquirendum
- Diplosolenodes occidentalis (Guilding, 1824)

Genus Latipes Colosi, 1922

- Latipes absumptus (Colosi, 1921) nomen inquirendum
- Latipes erinaceus (Colosi, 1921)
- Latipes ribeirensis (Thiele, 1927)
- Latipes rosillus (Thiele, 1927) nomen inquirendum

Genus Novovaginula Thiele, 1931

- Novovaginula boettgeri (Semper, 1885)
- Novovaginula carinata (Thiele, 1927)
- Novovaginula demorretesi (Coifmann, 1938)
- Novovaginula langsdorfi (Férussac, 1821) nomen inquirendum

Genus Phyllocaulis Colosi, 1922P

- Phyllocaulis boraceiensis Thomé, 1972
- Phyllocaulis renschi Thomé, 1965
- Phyllocaulis soleiformis (d’Orbigny, 1835)
- Phyllocaulis tuberculosus (Martens, 1868)
- Phyllocaulis variegatus (Semper, 1885)

Genus Potamojanuarius Thomé, 1975

- Potamojanuarius fuscus (Heynemann, 1885)
- Potamojanuarius lamellatus (Semper, 1885)

Genus Sarasinula Grimpe & Hoffmann, 1924

- Sarasinula kjellerupi (Semper, 1885) nomen inquirendum
- Sarasinula linguaeformis (Semper, 1885)
- Sarasinula marginata (Semper, 1885)
- Sarasinula plebeia (Fisher, 1868)

Genus Simrothula Thomé, 1975

- Simrothula paraensis Gomes, Picanco, Mendes & Thomé, 2006

Genus Vaginulus Férussac, 1821

- Vaginulus americanus (Colosi, 1921) nomen inquirendum
- Vaginulus defiorei (Coifmann, 1935) nomen inquirendum
- Vaginulus gracilis (Thiele, 1927) nomen inquirendum
- Vaginulus reclusus Allemão, 1857 nomen inquirendum
- Vaginulus superbus Gould, 1852 nomen inquirendum
- Vaginulus taunaisii Férussac, 1821

Genus Veronicella Blainville, 1817

- Veronicella fuscescens (Thiele, 1927)

=== Milacidae ===
- Milax cf. gagates (Draparnaud, 1801)
- Milax valentianus Férussac, 1821

=== Limacidae ===
- Limax maximus Linnaeus, 1758
- Limacus flavus

=== Agriolimacidae ===
- Deroceras laeve (Müller, 1774)

=== Philomycidae ===
- Pallifera sp.

=== Euconulidae (complete) ===
- Habroconus angueinus (Ancey, 1892) – synonym: Habroconus angüinus (Ancey, 1892)
- Habroconus goyazensis (Ancey, 1901)
- Habroconus martinezi (Hidalgo, 1869)
- Habroconus mayi (Baker, 1914)
- Habroconus semenline Moricand, 1846 – synonym: Habroconus (Pseudoguppya) semenlini (Moricand, 1845)
- Euconulus fulvus (Müller, 1774)
- Guppya sp.

=== Ferussaciidae (complete) ===
- Cecilioides blandiana (Crosse, 1880)
- Cecilioides consobrina (d'Orbigny, 1841)
- Cecilioides gundlachi (Pfeiffer, 1850)

=== Discidae ===
- Discus alternatus (Say, 1816)

=== Subulinidae (complete) ===
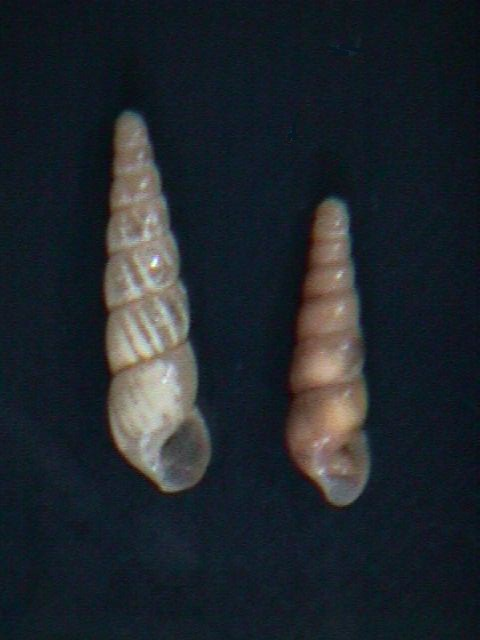
Subulina octona

- Subulina octona (Bruguière, 1789)
- Subulina parana Pilsbry, 1906
- Leptinaria bequaerti Pilsbry, 1926
- Leptinaria charlottei Baker, 1923
- Leptinaria concentrica (Reeve, 1849)
- Leptinaria lamellata (Potiez & Michaud, 1838)
- Leptinaria mamoreensis Baker, 1926
- Leptinaria monodon (C. B. Adams, 1849)
- Leptinaria parana Pilsbry, 1926
- Leptinaria ritchiei Pilsbry, 1907
- Leptinaria unilamellata (d'Orbigny, 1835)
- Lamellaxis gracilis (Hutton, 1834)
- Lamellaxis micra (d'Orbigny, 1835) – synonym: Allopeas micra (d'Orbigny, 1835)
- Opeas beckianum (Pfeiffer, 1846)
- Opeas goodalli (Miller, 1822)
- Opeas octogyrum (Pfeiffer, 1856)
- Opeas opella Pilsbry & Vanatta, 1906
- Rumina decollata (Linnaeus, 1758)
- Synapterpes coronatus (Pfeiffer, 1846)
- Synapterpes hanleyi (Pfeiffer, 1846)
- Obeliscus agassizi Pilsbry, 1906
- Obeliscus carphodes (Pfeiffer, 1852)
- Obeliscus columella (Philippi, 1844)
- Obeliscus obeliscus (Moricand, 1833)
- Obeliscus pattalus Pilsbry, 1906
- Obeliscus planospirus (Pfeiffer, 1852)
- Obeliscus sylvaticus (Spix, 1827)
- Obeliscus subuliformis (Moricand, 1836)
- Neobeliscus calcareus (Born, 1778)
- Vegrandinia trindadensis (Breure and Coelho, 1976) – synonym: Bulimulus trindadensis Breure & Coelho, 1976

=== Megaspiridae (complete) ===
- Callionepion iheringi Pilsbry & Vanatta, 1899
- Megaspira elata (Gould, 1847)
- Megaspira elatior (Spix, 1827)
- Megaspira iheringi Pilsbry, 1926
- Megaspira ruschenbergiana Jay, 1836

=== Oleacinidae (complete) ===
- Euglandina irakita Jardim, Abbate & Simone, 2013
- Euglandina striata

=== Strophocheilidae (complete) ===
- Anthinus albolabiatus (Jaeckel, 1927)
- Anthinus henselii (Martens, 1868)
- Anthinus miersi (Sowerby, 1838)
- Anthinus multicolor (Rang, 1831)
- Anthinus turnix (Gould, 1846)
- Gonyostomus goniostomus (Férussac, 1821)
- Gonyostomus egregius (Pfeiffer, 1845)
- Gonyostomus insularis Leme, 1974
- Mirinaba antoninensis (Lange-de-Morretes, 1952)
- Mirinaba cadeadensis (Lange-de-Morretes, 1952)
- Mirinaba curytibana (Lange-de-Morretes, 1952)
- Mirinaba cuspidens (Lange-de-Morretes, 1952)
- Mirinaba erythrosoma (Pilsbry, 1895)
- Mirinaba fusoides (Bequaert, 1948)
- Mirinaba jaussaudi (Lange-de-Morretes, 1937)
- Mirinaba planidens (Michelin, 1831)
- Mirinaba unidentata (Sowerby, 1825)
- Speironepion iguapensis (Pilsbry, 1901)
- Speironepion kronei (Ihering, 1901)
- Speironepion milleri (Sowerby, 1838)
- Speironepion pilsbryi (Ihering, 1900)
- Strophocheilus calus Pilsbry, 1901
- Strophocheilus contortuplicatus (Reeve, 1850)
- Strophocheilus debilis Bequaert, 1948
- Strophocheilus miersi Da Costa, 1904
- Strophocheilus pudicus (Müller, 1774)
- Strophocheilus roseolabris Bequaert, 1948
- Megalobulimus abbreviatus (Bequaert, 1948)
- Megalobulimus albescens (Bequaert, 1948)
- Megalobulimus albus (Bland & Binney, 1872)
- Megalobulimus amandus Simone, 2012
- Megalobulimus arapotiensis Lange-de-Morretes, 1952
- Megalobulimus auritus (Sowerby, 1838)
- Megalobulimus bereniceae (Lange-de-Morretes, 1952)
- Megalobulimus bertae Lange-de-Morretes, 1952
- Megalobulimus bronni (Pfeiffer, 1847)
- Megalobulimus capillaceus (Pfeiffer, 1855)
- Megalobulimus cardosoi (Lange-de-Morretes, 1952)
- Megalobulimus chionostoma (Mörch, 1852)
- Megalobulimus conicus (Bequaert, 1948)
- Megalobulimus dryades Fontenelle, Simone & Cavallari 2021
- Megalobulimus elongatus (Bequaert, 1948)
- Megalobulimus foreli (Bequaert, 1948)
- Megalobulimus fragilior (Ihering, 1901)
- Megalobulimus garbeanus (Leme, 1964)
- Megalobulimus globosus (Martens, 1876)
- Megalobulimus grandis (Martens, 1885)
- Megalobulimus granulosus (Rang, 1831)
- Megalobulimus gummatus (Hidalgo, 1870)
- Megalobulimus haemastomus (Scopoli, 1786)
- Megalobulimus hector (Pfeiffer, 1857)
- Megalobulimus intertextus (Pilsbry, 1895)
- Megalobulimus klappenbachi (Leme, 1964)
- Megalobulimus leonardosi (Lange-de-Morretes, 1952)
- Megalobulimus lopesi Leme, 1989
- Megalobulimus maximus (Sowerby, 1825)
- Megalobulimus mogianensis Simone & Leme, 1998
- Megalobulimus musculus (Bequaert, 1948)
- Megalobulimus nodai Lange-de-Morretes, 1952
- Megalobulimus oblongus (Müller, 1774)
- Megalobulimus oliveirai (Bequaert, 1948)
- Megalobulimus oosomus (Pilsbry, 1895)
- Megalobulimus ovatus (Müller, 1774)
- Megalobulimus parafragilior Leme & Indrusiak, 1990
- Megalobulimus paranaguensis (Pilsbry & Ihering, 1900)
- Megalobulimus pergranulatus (Pilsbry, 1901)
- Megalobulimus pintoi Lange-de-Morretes, 1952
- Megalobulimus popelairianus (Nyst, 1845)
- Megalobulimus proclivis (Martens, 1888)
- Megalobulimus pygmaeus (Bequaert, 1948)
- Megalobulimus riopretensis Simone & Leme, 1998
- Megalobulimus rolandianus Lange-de-Morretes, 1952
- Megalobulimus sanctipauli (Ihering & Pilsbry, 1900)
- Megalobulimus terrestris (Spix, 1827)
- Megalobulimus torii Lange-de-Morretes, 1937
- Megalobulimus valenciennesii (Pfeiffer, 1842)
- Megalobulimus vestitus (Pilsbry, 1926)
- Megalobulimus wohlersi Lange-de-Morretes, 1952
- Megalobulimus yporanganus (Ihering & Pilsbry, 1901)

=== Orthalicidae (complete include subfamilies according to the Bouchet & Rocroi, 2005) ===
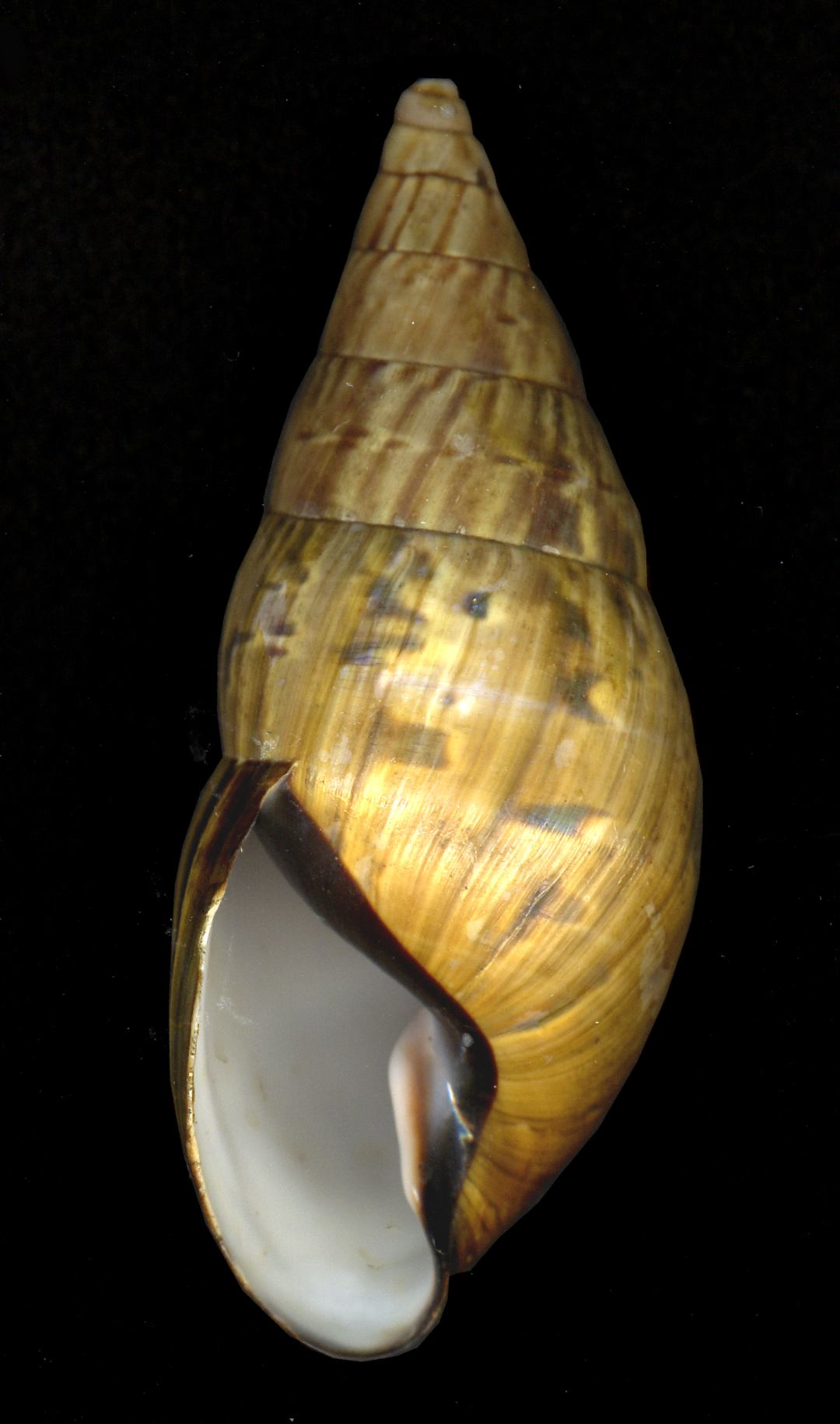
The shell of Corona perversa.

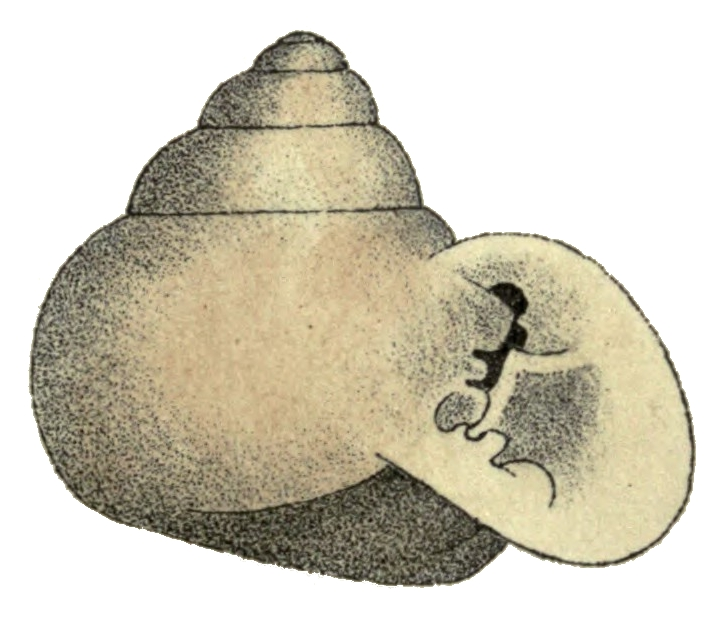
Biotocus turbinatus, synonym Tomigerus turbinatus, that was endemic to Brazil, is now extinct.

- Peltella iheringi Leme, 1968
- Peltella palliolum (Férussac, 1821)
- Plekocheilus floccosus (Spix, 1827)
- Plekocheilus pentadinus (d'Orbigny, 1835)
- Plekocheilus piperitus (Sowerby, 1838)
- Plekocheilus pseudopiperatus (Moricand, 1858)
- Plekocheilus rhodocheilus (Reeve, 1848)
- Eudolichotis distorta (Bruguière, 1789)
- Eudolichotis lacerta (Pfeiffer, 1855)
- Auris bernardii (Pfeiffer, 1856)
- Auris bilabiata (Broderip & Sowerby, 1829)
- Auris brachyplax Pilsbry, 1896
- Auris chrysostoma (Moricand, 1836)
- Auris egregia (Jay, 1836)
- Auris illheocola (Moricand, 1836)
- Auris melanostoma (Moricand, 1836)
- Auris melastoma (Swainson, 1820)
- Auris nigrilabris Pilsbry, 1896
- Thaumastus achilles (Pfeiffer, 1852)
- Thaumastus ascendens (Pfeiffer, 1852)
- Thaumastus baixoguanduensis Pena, Coelho & Salgado, 1996
- Thaumastus hebes Strebel, 1910
- Thaumastus largillierti (Philippi, 1845)
- Thaumastus magnificus (Grateloup, 1839)
- Thaumastus nehringi (Martens, 1889)
- Thaumastus requieni (Pfeiffer, 1852)
- Thaumastus spixii (Wagner, 1827)
- Thaumastus taunasii (Férussac, 1822)
- Thaumastus tiradentensis Pena, Coelho & Salgado, 1996
- Lopesianus cremulatus Weyrauch, 1958
- Aposcutalus atlanticus (Dutra & Leme, 1985)
- Otostomus signatus (Spix, 1827)
- Cochlorina aurisleporis (Bruguière, 1792)
- Cochlorina aurismuris (Moricand, 1839)
- Cochlorina involuta (Martens, 1867)
- Cochlorina lateralis (Menke, 1828)
- Cochlorina navicula (Wagner, 1827)
- Cochlorina uranops (Pilsbry, 1898)
- Pseudoxychona dulcis (Ihering, 1912)
- Pseudoxychona pileiformis (Moricand, 1836)
- Pseudoxychona polytricha (Ihering, 1912)
- Pseudoxychona spiritualis (Ihering, 1912)
- Rhinus ciliatus (Gould, 1846)
- Rhinus durus (Spix, 1827)
- Rhinus evelinae Leme, 1989
- Rhinus heterograma (Moricand, 1836)
- Rhinus heterotrichus (Moricand, 1836)
- Rhinus koseritzi (Clessin, 1888)
- Rhinus longisetus (Moricand, 1846)
- Rhinus obeliscus (Haas, 1936)
- Rhinus ovulum (Reeve, 1849)
- Rhinus pubescens (Moricand, 1846)
- Rhinus rochai (Baker, 1914)
- Rhinus scobinatus (Wood, 1828)
- Rhinus suturalis (Baker, 1914)
- Rhinus taipuensis (Baker, 1914)
- Rhinus thomei (Weyrauch, 1967)
- Rhinus velutinohispidus (Moricand, 1836)
- Simpulopsis atrovirens (Moricand, 1836)
- Simpulopsis brasiliensis (Moricand, 1846)
- Simpulopsis corrugata Guppy, 1866
- Simpulopsis decussata Pfeiffer, 1856
- Simpulopsis gomesae Silva & Thomé, 2006
- Simpulopsis miersi Pfeiffer, 1856
- Simpulopsis ovata (Sowerby, 1822)
- Simpulopsis promatensis Silva & Thomé 2006
- Simpulopsis pseudosulculosa Breure, 1975
- Simpulopsis rufovirens (Moricand, 1846)
- Simpulopsis sulculosa (Férussac, 1821)
- Simpulopsis tryoni Pilsbry, 1899
- Simpulopsis wiebesi Breure, 1975
- Eudioptus araujoi (Breure, 1975)
- Eudioptus boissieri (Moricand, 1846)
- Eudioptus citrinovitreus (Moricand, 1836)
- Eudioptus luteolus (Ancey, 1901)
- Eudioptus progastor (d'Orbigny, 1835)
- Eudioptus pseudosuccineus (Moricand, 1836)
- Sultana meobambensis (Pfeiffer, 1855)
- Sultana sultana (Dillwyn, 1817)
- Corona duckei Ihering, 1915
- Corona incisa (Hupé, 1857)
- Corona loroisiana (Hupé, 1857)
- Corona machadoensis Strebel, 1909
- Corona perversa (Swaison, 1821)
- Corona regalis (Hupé, 1857)
- Corona regina (Férussac, 1823)
- Corona ribeiroi Ihering, 1915
- Orthalicus bensoni (Reeve, 1849)
- Orthalicus capax (Pilsbry, 1930)
- Orthalicus mars Pfeiffer, 1861
- Orthalicus phlogerus (d'Orbigny, 1835)
- Orthalicus prototypus (Pilsbry, 1899)
- Orthalicus pulchellus (Spix, 1827)
- Orthalicus varius Martens, 1873
- Orthalicus zonatus Strebel, 1909
- Hyperaulax ramagei (Smith, 1890)
- Hyperaulax ridleyi (Smith, 1890)
- Anctus angiostomus (Wagner, 1827)
- Anctus laminiferus (Ancey, 1888)
- Cyclodontina branneri (Dall, 1909)
- Cyclodontina ciarana (Dohrn, 1882)
- Cyclodontina costulata (Ancey, 1904)
- Cyclodontina exesa (Spix, 1827)
- Cyclodontina fidaensis (Moricand, 1858)
- Cyclodontina fusiformis (Menke, 1828)
- Cyclodontina guarani (d'Orbigny, 1835)
- Cyclodontina iheringi (Marshall, 1926)
- Cyclodontina inflata (Wagner, 1827)
- Cyclodontina labrosa (Menke, 1828)
- Cyclodontina longula (Pfeiffer, 1859)
- Cyclodontina punctatissima (Lesson, 1830)
- Cyclodontina rhodinostoma (d'Orbigny, 1835)
- Cyclodontina salobrensis Solem, 1956
- Cyclodontina scrabella (Dohrn, 1882)
- Cyclodontina squarrosus (Ancey, 1904)
- Cyclodontina tudiculata (Martens, 1868)
- Bahiensis albofilosus (Dohrn, 1883)
- Bahiensis bahiensis (Moricand, 1833)
- Bahiensis janeirensis (Sowerby, 1838)
- Bahiensis miliolus (d'Orbigny, 1835)
- Bahiensis occultus (Reeve, 1849)
- Bahiensis reevei (Deshayes, 1851)
- Bahiensis ringens (Dunker, 1847)
- Moricandia angulata (Wagner, 1827)
- Moricandia auriscervina (Férussac, 1821)
- Moricandia bouvieri (Dautzenberg, 1896)
- Moricandia dubiosa (Jay, 1839)
- Moricandia nasuta (Martens, 1886)
- Moricandia toleratus (Fulton, 1903)
- Moricandia willi (Dohrn, 1883)
- Spixia hilairii (Pfeiffer, 1845)
- Spixia paraguayana (Ancey, 1892)
- Spixia striata (Spix, 1827)
- Plagiodontes trayrae (Jaeckel, 1950)
- Clessinia costata (Pfeiffer, 1848)
- Clessinia neglecta (Pfeiffer, 1847)
- Clessinia oblita (Reeve, 1848)
- Odontostomus dautzenbergianus Pilsbry, 1898
- Odontostomus degeneratus Pilsbry, 1899
- Odontostomus fasciatus (Pfeiffer, 1869)
- Odontostomus gargantuus (Rang, 1831)
- Odontostomus gemellatus Ancey, 1901
- Odontostomus grayanus (Pfeiffer, 1845)
- Odontostomus königswaldi (Thiele, 1906)
- Odontostomus leucotremus (Beck, 1837)
- Odontostomus odontostomus (Sowerby, 1824)
- Odontostomus paulistus Pilsbry & Ihering, 1898
- Odontostomus sexdentatus (Spix, 1827)
- Odontostomus simplex (Thiele, 1906)
- Odontostomus squarrosus Ancey, 1904
- Odontostomus thielei (Pilsbry, 1930)
- Tomigerus clausus Spix, 1827
- Tomigerus corrugatus Ihering, 1905
- Tomigerus esamianus Salgado & Coelho, 1990
- Tomigerus laevis Ihering, 1905
- Tomigerus matthewsi Salgado & Leme, 1991
- Tomigerus pilsbryi Baker, 1914
- Tomigerus rochai Ihering, 1905
- Digerus gibberulus (Burrow, 1815), synonym: Tomigerus gibberulus – extinct
- Biotocus cumingi (Pfeiffer, 1849)
- Biotocus turbinatus (Pfeiffer, 1845), synonym: Tomigerus turbinatus – extinct
- Biotocus ubajarensis (Leme, 1980)
- Anostoma baileyi Solem, 1956
- Anostoma depressum Lamarck, 1822
- Anostoma deshayesianum Fischer, 1857
- Anostoma octodentatum Fischer von Waldheim, 1807
- Anostoma rossi Weber, 1925
- Ringicella carinatum (Pfeiffer, 1853)
- Ringicella luetzelburgi (Weber, 1925)
- Ringicella ringens (Linnaeus, 1758)

=== Simpulopsidae ===
- Rhinus gilbertus Simone & Casati, 2013

=== Odontostomidae ===
- Clinispira insolita Simone & Casati, 2013
- Anostoma tessa Simone, 2012
- Cyclodontina capivara Simone & Casati, 2013
- Pilsbrylia dalli Simone, 2018

=== Bulimulidae ===
- Anctus prolatus Simone & Casati, 2013
- Bulimulus angustus Weyrauch, 1966
- Bulimulus brunoi (Ihering, 1917)
- Bulimulus corumbaensis Pilsbry, 1897
- Bulimulus dukinfieldi Melvill, 1900
- Bulimulus eganus (Pfeiffer, 1853)
- Bulimulus ephippium Ancey, 1904
- Bulimulus erectus (Reeve, 1849)
- Bulimulus marcidus (Pfeiffer, 1852)
- Bulimulus sporadicus (d'Orbigny, 1835)
- Bulimulus stilbe Pilsbry, 1901
- Bulimulus tenuissimus (Férussac, 1832)
- Bulimulus vesicalis (Pfeiffer, 1853)
- Naesiotus arnaldoi (Lanzieri & Rezende, 1971)
- Naesiotus carlucioi (Rezende & Lanzieri, 1963)
- Naesiotus cutisculptus Ancey, 1901
- Naesiotus eudioptus "Ihering", Pilsbry, 1897
- Naesiotus lopesi (Rezende, Lanzieri & Inada, 1972)
- Naesiotus montivagus (d'Orbigny, 1835)
- Naesiotus pachys (Pilsbry, 1897)
- Kora corallina Simone, 2012 (endemic)
- Kora nigra Simone, 2015 (endemic)
- Kora rupestris Salvador & Simone, 2016 (endemic)
- Oxychona bifasciata (Burrow, 1815)
- Oxychona blanchetiana (Moricand, 1833)
- Oxychona lonchostoma (Menke, 1828)
- Oxychona maculata Salvador & Cavallari, 2013
- Oxychona pyramidella (Wagner, 1827)
- Drymaeus acervatus (Pfeiffer, 1857)
- Drymaeus acuminatus Da Costa, 1906
- Drymaeus balteatus Pilsbry, 1898
- Drymaeus bivittatus (Sowerby, 1833)
- Drymaeus branneri Baker, 1914
- Drymaeus bucia (Pfeiffer, 1859)
- Drymaeus coarctatus (Pfeiffer, 1845)
- Drymaeus cuticulus (Pfeiffer, 1855)
- Drymaeus dutaillyi (Pfeiffer, 1856)
- Drymaeus edmülleri (Albers, 1854)
- Drymaeus expansus (Pfeiffer, 1848)
- Drymaeus flexilabris (Pfeiffer, 1853)
- Drymaeus gereti Ancey. 1901
- Drymaeus germaini (Ancey, 1892)
- Drymaeus hygrohylaeus (d'Orbigny, 1835)
- Drymaeus interpunctus (Martens, 1887)
- Drymaeus limicolarioides Haas, 1936
- Drymaeus lusorius (Pfeiffer, 1848)
- Drymaeus lynchi Parodiz, 1946
- Drymaeus magus (Wagner, 1827)
- Drymaeus muelleggeri Jaeckel, 1927
- Drymaeus nigrogularis (Dohrn, 1882)
- Drymaeus oreades (d'Orbigny, 1835)
- Drymaeus papyraceus (Mawe, 1823)
- Drymaeus papyrifactus Pilsbry, 1898
- Drymaeus poecilus (d'Orbigny, 1835)
- Drymaeus protractus (Pfeiffer, 1855)
- Drymaeus ribeiroi Ihering, 1915
- Drymaeus roseatus (Reeve, 1848)
- Drymaeus saccatus (Pfeiffer, 1855)
- Drymaeus semistriatus Haas, 1955
- Drymaeus similaris (Moricand, 1856)
- Drymaeus siolii Haas, 1952
- Drymaeus souzalopesi Weyrauch, 1965
- Drymaeus subsimilaris Pilsbry, 1898
- Drymaeus succineus Pilsbry, 1901
- Drymaeus suprapunctatus Baker, 1914
- Drymaeus vanattai Pilsbry, 1898
- Leiostracus cinnamomeolineatus (Moricand, 1841)
- Leiostracus clouei (Pfeiffer, 1856)
- Leiostracus goniotropis (Ancey, 1904)
- Leiostracus manoeli (Moricand, 1841)
- Leiostracus melanoscolops (Dohrn, 1882)
- Leiostracus obliquus (Reeve, 1849)
- Leiostracus onager (Beck, 1837)
- Leiostracus perlucidus (Spix, 1827)
- Leiostracus sarchochilus (Pfeiffer, 1837)
- Leiostracus subtuszonatus (Pilsbry, 1899)
- Leiostracus vimineus (Moricand, 1833)
- Leiostracus vittatus (Spix, 1827)
- Spixia coltrorum Simone, 2012

=== Scolodontidae (complete) ===
- Scolodonta amazonica (Dohrn, 1882)
- Scolodonta bounoboena (d'Orbigny, 1835)
- Scolodonta interrupta (Suter, 1900)
- Scolodonta mutata (Gould, 1846)
- Scolodonta nitidula (Dohrn, 1882)
- Scolodonta spirorbis (Deshayes, 1850)
- Systrophia eatoni Baker, 1914
- Systrophia siolii Haas, 1955
- Entodina cheilostropha (d'Orbigny, 1835)
- Entodina derbyi (Ihering, 1912)
- Entodina exigua (Thiele, 1927)
- Entodina jekylli Baker, 1914
- Entodina lundi (Mörch, 1871)
- Drepanostomella sp.
- Wayampia sp.
- Happia ammoniformis (d'Orbigny, 1835)
- Happia ammonoceras (Pfeiffer, 1854)
- Happia besckei (Dunker, 1847)
- Happia euspira (Pfeiffer, 1854)
- Happia grata Thiele, 1927
- Happia iheringi (Clessin, 1888)
- Happia insularis (Böttger, 1889)
- Happia microdiscus Thiele, 1927
- Happia mülleri Thiele, 1927
- Happia pilsbryi Lange-de-Morretes, 1949
- Happia snethlagei Baker, 1914
- Happia vitrina (Wagner, 1827)
- Miradiscops brasiliensis (Thiele, 1927)
- Tamayops banghaasi (Thiele, 1927)

=== Streptaxidae (complete) ===
- Huttonella bicolor (Hutton, 1834) – First report in 2008.
- Martinella prisca Thiele, 1927
- Rectartemon apertus (Martens, 1868)
- Rectartemon candidus (Spix, 1827)
- Rectartemon cappilosus (Pilsbry, 1897)
- Rectartemon cryptodon (Moricand, 1851)
- Rectartemon depressus (Heynemann, 1868)
- Rectartemon helios (Pilsbry, 1897)
- Rectartemon hylephilus (d'Orbigny, 1835)
- Rectartemon intermedius (Albers, 1857)
- Rectartemon mulleri (Thiele, 1927)
- Rectartemon politus (Fulton, 1899)
- Rectartemon rollandi (Bernardi, 1857)
- Rectartemon spixianus (Pfeiffer,1841)
- Rectartemon wagneri (Pfeiffer, 1841)
- Hypselartemon alveus (Dunker, 1845)
- Hypselartemon contusulus (Férussac, 1827)
- Hypselartemon deshayesianus (Crosse, 1863)
- Hypselartemon paivanus (Pfeiffer, 1867)
- Streptaxis contusus (Férussac, 1821)
- Streptaxis decussatus Pilsbry, 1897
- Streptaxis dunkeri Pfeiffer, 1845
- Streptaxis iguapensis Pilsbry, 1930
- Streptaxis iheringi Thiele, 1827
- Streptaxis lutzelburgi Weber, 1925
- Streptaxis pfeifferi (Pilsbry, 1930)
- Streptaxis piquetensis (Pilsbry, 1930)
- Streptaxis regius Lobbecke, 1881
- Streptaxis saopaulensis Pilsbry, 1930
- Streptaxis subregularis Pfeiffer, 1846
- Streptaxis tumulus Pilsbry, 1897
- Streptaxis uberiformis Pfeiffer, 1848
- Streptartemon abunaensis (Baker, 1914)
- Streptartemon candeanus (Petit, 1842)
- Streptartemon comboides (d'Orbigny, 1835)
- Streptartemon cookeanus (Baker, 1914)
- Streptartemon crossei (Pfeiffer, 1867)
- Streptartemon cumingianus (Pfeiffer, 1849)
- Streptartemon decipiens (Crosse, 1865)
- Streptartemon deformis (Férussac, 1821)
- Streptartemon dejectus (Petit, 1842)
- Streptartemon deplanchei (Drouet, 1859)
- Streptartemon elata (Moricand, 1846)
- Streptartemon extraneus Haas, 1955
- Streptartemon glaber (Pfeiffer, 1849)
- Streptartemon molaris Simone & Casati, 2013
- Streptartemon quixadensis (Baker, 1914)
- Streptartemon streptodon (Moricand, 1851)
- Sairostoma perplexum Haas, 1938

=== Camaenidae (complete) ===
- Polygyratia polygyrata (Born, 1778)

=== Pleurodontidae (complete) ===
- Labyrinthus furcillatus (Hupé, 1853)
- Labyrinthus raimondii (Philippi, 1867)
- Labyrinthus yatesi (Pfeiffer, 1855)
- Solaropsis amazonica (Pfeiffer, 1854)
- Solaropsis anguicula (Hupé, 1853)
- Solaropsis bachi Ihering, 1900
- Solaropsis brasiliana (Deshayes, 1831)
- Solaropsis cearana (Baker, 1914)
- Solaropsis cicatricata Beck, 1837
- Solaropsis derbyi (Ihering, 1900)
- Solaropsis elaps Dohrn, 1882
- Solaropsis fairchildi Bequaert & Clench, 1938
- Solaropsis feisthameli (Hupé, 1853)
- Solaropsis heliaca (d'Orbigny, 1835)
- Solaropsis johnsoni Pilsbry, 1933
- Solaropsis leopoldina (Strubel, 1895)
- Solaropsis pascalia (Cailliaud, 1857)
- Solaropsis pilsbryi Ihering, 1900
- Solaropsis rosarium (Pfeiffer, 1849)
- Solaropsis rugifera Dohrn, 1882
- Solaropsis serpens (Spix, 1827)
- Solaropsis trigonostoma Haas, 1934
- Solaropsis undata (Lightfoot, 1786)
- Solaropsis vipera (Pfeiffer, 1859)

=== Bradybaenidae (complete) ===
- Bradybaena similaris (Férussac, 1821)

=== Epiphragmophoridae (complete) ===
- Epiphragmophora bernardius
- Epiphragmophora semiclausa (Martens, 1868)

=== Helicidae (complete) ===
- Cornu aspersum (O.F. Müller, 1774)

== Bivalvia ==
116 species.

== See also ==
- List of marine molluscs of Brazil

Lists of molluscs of surrounding countries:

- List of non-marine molluscs of Venezuela
- List of non-marine molluscs of Suriname
- List of non-marine molluscs of Guyana
- List of non-marine molluscs of French Guiana
- List of non-marine molluscs of Colombia
- List of non-marine molluscs of Bolivia
- List of non-marine molluscs of Peru
- List of non-marine molluscs of Argentina
- List of non-marine molluscs of Paraguay
- List of non-marine molluscs of Uruguay
