= Tomogeridae =

Scientific classification
- Kingdom: Animalia
- Phylum: Mollusca
- Class: Gastropoda
- Order: Stylommatophora
- Suborder: Helicina
- Superfamily: Orthalicoidea
- Family: Tomogeridae; Jousseaume, 1877

Family of gastropods

Tomogeridae is a taxonomic family of air-breathing land snails, terrestrial pulmonate gastropod mollusks in the superfamily Orthalicoidea.

== Characteristics ==
(Original description in French) "For M. Jousseaume, the genus Anostoma constitutes a family to which he gives the name TOMOGERIDAE, and which contains two perfectly distinct genera: one with an imperforate peristome, which is the genus Tomogeres of Montfort (Anostoma of Fischer, not Anostomus of Gronov); and the other with a perforate peristome, for which he creates the genus Tomogerina, whose type would be Anostoma globulosum Lam."

Tomogeres and Tomogerina are both now considered synonyms of Anastoma. Anostomag globulosum is a synonym of Anostoma ringens (Linnaeus, 1758)

== Genera ==
- Anostoma Fischer von Waldheim, 1807
- Biotocus Salgado & Leme, 1990
- Clinispira Simone & Casati, 2013
- Hyperaulax Pilsbry, 1897
- Tomigerus Spix, 1827

Synonyms

- Angystoma Schumacher, 1817: synonym of Anostoma (Ringicella) J. E. Gray, 1847 represented as Anostoma Fischer von Waldheim, 1807
- Bonnanius Jousseaume, 1900: synonym of Hyperaulax Pilsbry, 1897 (junior subjective synonym)
- Tomogeres Montfort, 1810: synonym of Anostoma Fischer von Waldheim, 1807
- Tomogerina Jousseaume, 1877: synonym of Anostoma (Ringicella) J. E. Gray, 1847 represented as Anostoma Fischer von Waldheim, 1807
