= List of non-marine molluscs of Argentina =

Location of Argentina

The non-marine molluscs of Argentina are a part of the molluscan fauna of Argentina.

There are hundreds of species of molluscs living in the wild in Argentina.

There are a total of ??? species of gastropods, which breaks down to 101 species of freshwater gastropods, and ??? species of land gastropods in ?? genera, plus 65 species of bivalves living in the wild.

There are ?? non-indigenous species of gastropods (4 freshwater and ?? land species: ?? snails and ?? slugs) and ? species of bivalves in the wild in Argentina. This is a total of ? freshwater non-indigenous species of wild molluscs.

Potamolithus is the largest genus (with highest species richness) of recent freshwater snails in Argentina.

Summary table of number of species

	Argentina
freshwater gastropods	101
land gastropods	???
gastropods altogether	???
bivalves	65
molluscs altogether	???
non-indigenous gastropods in the wild	4 freshwater and ?? land
non-indigenous synantrop gastropods	?
non-indigenous bivalves in the wild	?
non-indigenous synantrop bivalves	?
non-indigenous molluscs altogether	4

== Freshwater gastropods ==
There are 10 families of freshwater gastropods in Argentina. There are 40 species of freshwater gastropods endemic to Argentina. There are about 45 endangered freshwater gastropods in Argentina.

Ampullariidae – 12 species, one endemic

- Asolene platae (Maton, 1809)
- Asolene pulchella (Anton, 1839)
- Asolene spixii (d'Orbigny, 1835)
- Felipponea neritiniformis (Dall, 1919)
- Felipponea elongata (Dall, 1921)
- Felipponea iheringi (Pilsbry, 1933)
- Marisa planogyra Pilsbry, 1933
- Pomacea canaliculata (Lamarck, 1822)
- Pomacea insularum (d'Orbigny, 1835)
- Pomacea scalaris (d'Orbigny, 1835)
- Pomella americanista (Ihering, 1919)
- Pomella megastoma (G. B. Sowerby I, 1825)

Thiaridae – 4 species, 3 endemic but extinct in the wild

- Aylacostoma chloroticum Hylton-Scot, 1954 – extinct in the wild
- Aylacostoma guaraniticum (Hylton-Scot, 1951) – extinct in the wild
- Aylacostoma stigmaticum Hylton-Scot, 1954 – extinct in the wild
- Melanoides tuberculata (O. F. Müller, 1774)

Cochliopidae – 16 species, 10 endemic

- Heleobia australis (d'Orbigny, 1835)
- Heleobia castellanosae (Gaillard, 1974)
- Heleobia conexa (Gaillard, 1974)
- Heleobia guaranitica (Doering, 1884)
- Heleobia hatcheri (Pilsbry, 1911)
- Heleobia isabelleana (d'Orbigny, 1835)
- Heleobia kuesteri (Ströbel, 1874)
- Heleobia montana (Doering, 1884)
- Heleobia occidentalis (Doering, 1884)
- Heleobia parchappii (d'Orbigny, 1835) – but Heleobia occidentalis and Heleobia vianai may be synonyms of Heleobia parchappii
- Heleobia peiranoi (Weyrauch, 1963)
- Heleobia piscium (d'Orbigny, 1835)
- Heleobia rionegrina (Gaillard, 1974)
- Heleobia sublineata (Pilsbry, 1911)
- Heleobia tucumana (Gaillard, 1974)
- Heleobia vianai (Parodiz, 1960)

Lithoglyphidae – 22 species

- Potamolithus agapetus Pilsbry, 1911
- Potamolithus bushii (Frauenfeld, 1865)
- Potamolithus callosus Pilsbry, 1925
- Potamolithus catharinae Pilsbry, 1911
- Potamolithus concordianus Parodiz, 1966
- Potamolithus conicus (Brot, 1867)
- Potamolithus dinochilus Pilsbry, 1896
- Potamolithus doeringi Pilsbry, 1911
- Potamolithus hidalgoi Pilsbry, 1896
- Potamolithus iheringi Pilsbry, 1896
- Potamolithus lapidum (d'Orbigny, 1835)
- Potamolithus microthauma Pilsbry, 1896
- Potamolithus orbignyi Pilsbry, 1896
- Potamolithus paranensis Pilsbry, 1911
- Potamolithus peristomatus (d'Orbigny, 1835)
- Potamolithus petitianus (d'Orbigny, 1840)
- Potamolithus philipianus Pilsbry, 1911
- Potamolithus quadratus Pilsbry & Ihering, 1911
- Potamolithus rushii Pilsbry, 1896
- Potamolithus simplex Pilsbry, 1911
- Potamolithus tricostatus (Brot, 1867)
- Potamolithus valchetensis Miquel, 1998

Glacidorbidae – 1 species

- Gondwanorbis magallanicus (Meier-Brook & Smith, 1976)

Chilinidae – 17 species, 12 endemic

- Chilina aurantia Marshall, 1924
- Chilina dombeiana (Bruguière, 1789)
- Chilina fluminea (Maton, 1809)
- Chilina fulgurata Pilsbry, 1911
- Chilina gallardoi Castellanos & Gaillard, 1981
- Chilina gibbosa G. B. Sowerby I, 1841
- Chilina guaraniana Castellanos & Miquel, 1980
- Chilina iguazuensis Gregoric & Rumi, 2008
- Chilina megastoma Hylton Scott, 1958
- Chilina mendozana Ströbel, 1874
- Chilina neuquenensis Marshall, 1933
- Chilina parchappii (d'Orbigny, 1835)
- Chilina patagonica Sowerby II, 1874
- Chilina perrieri Mabille, 1833
- Chilina portillensis Hidalgo, 1880
- Chilina rushii Pilsbry, 1911
- Chilina strebeli Pilsbry, 1911

Lymnaeidae – 5 species, 2 endemic

- Pseudosuccinea columella (Say, 1817)
- Lymnaea diaphana King, 1830
- Lymnaea pictonica Rochebrune & Mabille, 1885
- Lymnaea plicata Hylton Scott, 1953
- Lymnaea viatrix (d´Orbigny, 1835)

Planorbidae – 20 species

- Antillorbis nordestensis (Lucena, 1954)
- Acrorbis petricola Odhner, 1937
- Biomphalaria intermedia (Paraense & Deslandes, 1962)
- Biomphalaria occidentalis Paraense, 1981
- Biomphalaria oligoza Paraense, 1974
- Biomphalaria orbignyi Paraense, 1975
- Biomphalaria peregrina (d´Orbigny, 1835)
- Biomphalaria straminea (Dunker, 1848)
- Biomphalaria tenagophila (d´Orbigny, 1835)
- Drepanotrema anatinum (d´Orbigny, 1835)
- Drepanotrema cimex (Moricand, 1839)
- Drepanotrema depressissimun (Moricand, 1839)
- Drepanotrema heloicum (d'Orbigny, 1835)
- Drepanotrema kermatoides (d'Orbigny, 1835)
- Drepanotrema lucidum (Pfeiffer, 1839)
- Anisancylus obliquus (Broderip & G. B. Sowerby I, 1832)
- Gundlachia ticaga (Marcus & Marcus, 1962)
- Hebetancylus moricandi (d´Orbigny, 1837)
- Laevapex sp.
- Uncancylus concentricus (d´Orbigny, 1835)

Physidae – 5 species, 2? endemic

- Physa aspii Holmerg, 1909
- Physa loosi Holmerg, 1909
- "Physella cubensis" (Pfeiffer, 1839)
- "Physella venustula" (Gould, 1848)
- "Stenophysa marmorata" (Guilding, 1828)

== Land gastropods ==
Cyclophoridae

- Adelopoma tucma

Charopidae

- Lilloiconcha tucumana
- Radiodiscus iheringi
- Trochogyra leptotera Rochebrune & Mabille, 1882

Helicodiscidae

Diplommatinidae

Succineidae

- Omalonyx unguis (d'Orbigny, 1837)

Scolodontidae (Systrophiidae is a synonym for Scolodontidae)

- Wayampia trochilioneides
- Scolodonta Doering, 1875

Odontostomidae

- Plagiodontes rocae Doering, 1881
- Plagiodontes weyrauchi Pizá & Cazzaniga, 2009

Milacidae

- Milax gagates (Draparnaud, 1801) – non-indigenous

Epiphragmophoridae

- Epiphragmophora Doering, 1874 – (see also Cuezzo 2006)

== Freshwater bivalves ==
Hyriidae – 1? endemic

Etheriidae – 1? endemic

Sphaeriidae – 25 species, 10 endemic

Corbiculidae

- Corbicula fluminea – invasive species

Mytilidae

- Limnoperna fortunei – invasive species

== See also ==
- List of marine molluscs of Argentina

Lists of molluscs of surrounding countries:

- List of non-marine molluscs of Chile
- List of non-marine molluscs of Bolivia
- List of non-marine molluscs of Paraguay
- List of non-marine molluscs of Brazil
- List of non-marine molluscs of Uruguay
