= List of non-marine molluscs of Uruguay =

Location of Uruguay

The non-marine molluscs of Uruguay are a part of the molluscan fauna of Uruguay (wildlife of Uruguay).

A number of species of non-marine molluscs are found in the wild in Uruguay.

Summary table of number of species:
Numbers of molluscs by habitat	Number of species
Freshwater gastropods	51
Land gastropods	??
Total number of non-marine gastropods	??
Freshwater bivalves	??
Total number of non-marine molluscs	??

== Freshwater gastropods ==
Freshwater gastropods in the Uruguay include:

Ampullariidae - 10 species

- Asolene platae (Maton, 1809)
- Asolene pulchella (Anton, 1839)
- Asolene spixii (d’Orbigny, 1837)
- Felipponea elongata (Dall, 1921)
- Felipponea iheringi (Pilsbry, 1933)
- Felipponea neritiniformis (Dall, 1919)
- Pomella megastoma (G. B. Sowerby I, 1825)
- Pomacea canaliculata (Lamarck, 1822)
- Pomacea insularum (d’Orbigny, 1835)
- Pomacea scalaris (d’Orbigny, 1835)

Cochliopidae - 6 species

- Heleobia adamsi (Preston, 1912)
- Heleobia guaranitica (Doering, 1884)
- Heleobia parchappii (d’Orbigny, 1835)
- Heleobia piscium (d’Orbigny, 1835)
- Heleobia scottii (Pilsbry, 1911)
- Heleobia uruguayana (Pilsbry, 1924)

Lithoglyphidae - 17 species

- Potamolithus agapetus Pilsbry, 1911
- Potamolithus bushii (Frauenfeld, 1865)
- Potamolithus carinifer Pilsbry, 1911
- Potamolithus catharinae Pilsbry, 1911
- Potamolithus doeringi Pilsbry, 1911
- Potamolithus felipponei Ihering, 1910
- Potamolithus hidalgoi Pilsbry, 1896
- Potamolithus iheringi Pilsbry, 1896
- Potamolithus lapidum (d'Orbigny, 1835)
- Potamolithus orbignyi Pilsbry, 1896
- Potamolithus peristomatus (d'Orbigny, 1835)
- Potamolithus petitianus (d'Orbigny, 1840) - subspecies Potamolithus petitianus sykesii Pilsbry, 1896
- Potamolithus philipianus Pilsbry, 1911
- Potamolithus quadratus Pilsbry & Ihering, 1911
- Potamolithus rushii Pilsbry, 1896
- Potamolithus simplex Pilsbry, 1911
- Potamolithus tricostatus (Brot, 1867)

Lymnaeidae - 2 species

- Lymnaea viatrix (d’Orbigny, 1835)
- Pseudosuccinea columella (Say, 1817)

Physidae - 1 species

- "Aplexa" minor (d’Orbigny, 1837)

Planorbidae - 13 species

- Biomphalaria tenagophila (d’Orbigny, 1835) - Biomphalaria tenagophila tenagophila (d’Orbigny, 1835) and Biomphalaria tenagophila guaibensis Paraense, 1984
- Biomphalaria peregrina (d’Orbigny, 1835)
- Biomphalaria straminea (Dunker, 1848)
- Drepanotrema anatinum (d’Orbigny, 1835)
- Drepanotrema cimex (Moricand, 1839)
- Drepanotrema depressissimum (Moricand, 1839)
- Drepanotrema heloicum (d’Orbigny, 1835)
- Drepanotrema kermatoides (d’Orbigny, 1835)
- Drepanotrema lucidum (Pfeiffer, 1839)
- Antillorbis nordestensis (Lucena, 1954)
- Uncancylus concentricus (d’Orbigny, 1835)
- Hebetancylus moricandi (d’Orbigny, 1837)
- Anisancylus obliquus (Broderip & G. B. Sowerby I, 1832)

Chilinidae - 2 species

- Chilina fluminea (Maton, 1809)
- Chilina rushii Pilsbry, 1896

== Land gastropods ==
Charopidae

- Radiodiscus iheringi
- Trochogyra leptotera Rochebrune & Mabille, 1882

== See also ==
- List of marine molluscs of Uruguay
- Fauna of Uruguay

Lists of molluscs of surrounding countries:

- List of non-marine molluscs of Argentina, Wildlife of Argentina
- List of non-marine molluscs of Brazil, Wildlife of Brazil
