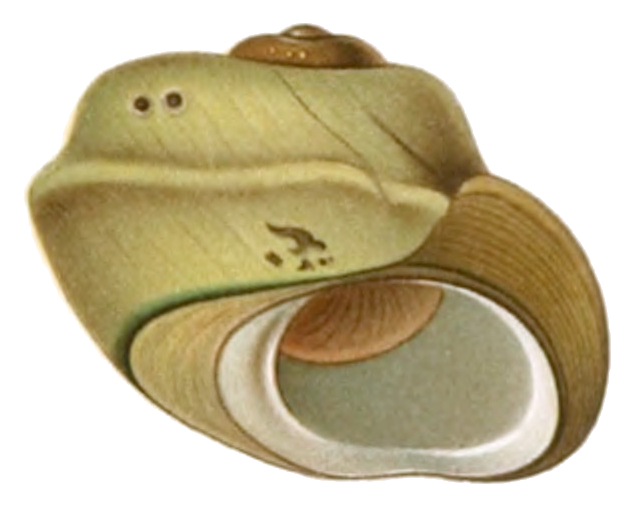
- Drawing of an apertural view of the shell of Potamolithus rushii

Scientific classification
- Kingdom: Animalia
- Phylum: Mollusca
- Class: Gastropoda
- Subclass: Caenogastropoda
- Order: Littorinimorpha
- Family: Tateidae
- Genus: Potamolithus; Pilsbry, 1896

Type species
- Paludina lapidum d'Orbigny, 1835

= Potamolithus =

Genus of gastropods

Potamolithus is a genus of small freshwater snails that have an operculum, aquatic gastropod mollusks in the family Tateidae.

Potamolithus was traditionally classified within the Hydrobiidae. However, anatomical study of Potamolithus by Davis & Pons da Silva (1984) showed its relationship with Lithoglyphus, and it is then placed within the family Lithoglyphidae.

The first appearance of the name Potamolithus was in November 1896 as a nomen nudum (a bare name with no description or illustration). The genus was formally defined by Pilsbry in December 1896.

== Distribution ==
Potamolithus is the only genus of the family Tateidae in South America. Distribution of Potamolithus includes Argentina (22 species, 11 species are endemic to Argentina), Uruguay (17 species) and Brazil. Potamolithus is the largest genus (i.e. the one with the highest species richness) of recent freshwater snails in Argentina and in Uruguay.

== Species ==
Species within the genus Potamolithus include:

- Potamolithus agapetus Pilsbry, 1911
- Potamolithus bushii (Frauenfeld, 1865)
- Potamolithus callosus Pilsbry, 1925
- Potamolithus carinifer Pilsbry, 1911
- Potamolithus catharinae Pilsbry, 1911
- Potamolithus concordianus Parodiz, 1966
- Potamolithus conicus (Brot, 1867)
- Potamolithus dinochilus Pilsbry, 1896
- Potamolithus doeringi Pilsbry, 1911
- Potamolithus fabiani
- Potamolithus felipponei Ihering, 1910
- Potamolithus hidalgoi Pilsbry, 1896 - synonyms: Potamolithus microthauma Pilsbry, 1896; Potamolithus dinochilus Pilsbry, 1896; Potamolithus hatcheri Pilsbry, 1911
- Potamolithus iheringi Pilsbry, 1896
- Potamolithus karsticus Simone & Moracchioli, 1994
- Potamolithus lapidum (d'Orbigny, 1835) - synonyms: Potamolithus lapidum supersulcatus Pilsbry, 1896; Potamolithus paysanduanus Ihering, 1910; Potamolithus lapidum var. elatior Pilsbry, 1911; Potamolithus callosus Pilsbry, 1926
- Potamolithus microthauma Pilsbry, 1896
- Potamolithus orbignyi Pilsbry, 1896
- Potamolithus paranensis Pilsbry, 1911
- Potamolithus peristomatus (d'Orbigny, 1835)
- Potamolithus petitianus (d'Orbigny, 1840)
  - Potamolithus petitianus sykesii Pilsbry, 1896 - synonyms: Potamolithus bisinuatus bisinuatus Pilsbry, 1896; Potamolithus bisinuatus obsoletus Pilsbry, 1896; Potamolithus gracilis gracilis Pilsbry, 1896; Potamolithus gracilis viridis Pilsbry, 1896
- Potamolithus philipianus Pilsbry, 1911
- Potamolithus quadratus Pilsbry & Ihering, 1911
- Potamolithus rushii Pilsbry, 1896 - type genus
- Potamolithus ribeirensis Pilsbry, 1911
- Potamolithus simplex Pilsbry, 1911
- Potamolithus tricostatus (Brot, 1867)
- Potamolithus troglobius Simone & Moracchioli, 1994
- Potamolithus valchetensis Miquel, 1998

== Ecology ==
Potamolithus species live in streams. Some species are subterranean, living in caves (for example Potamolithus troglobius and Potamolithus karsticus).
