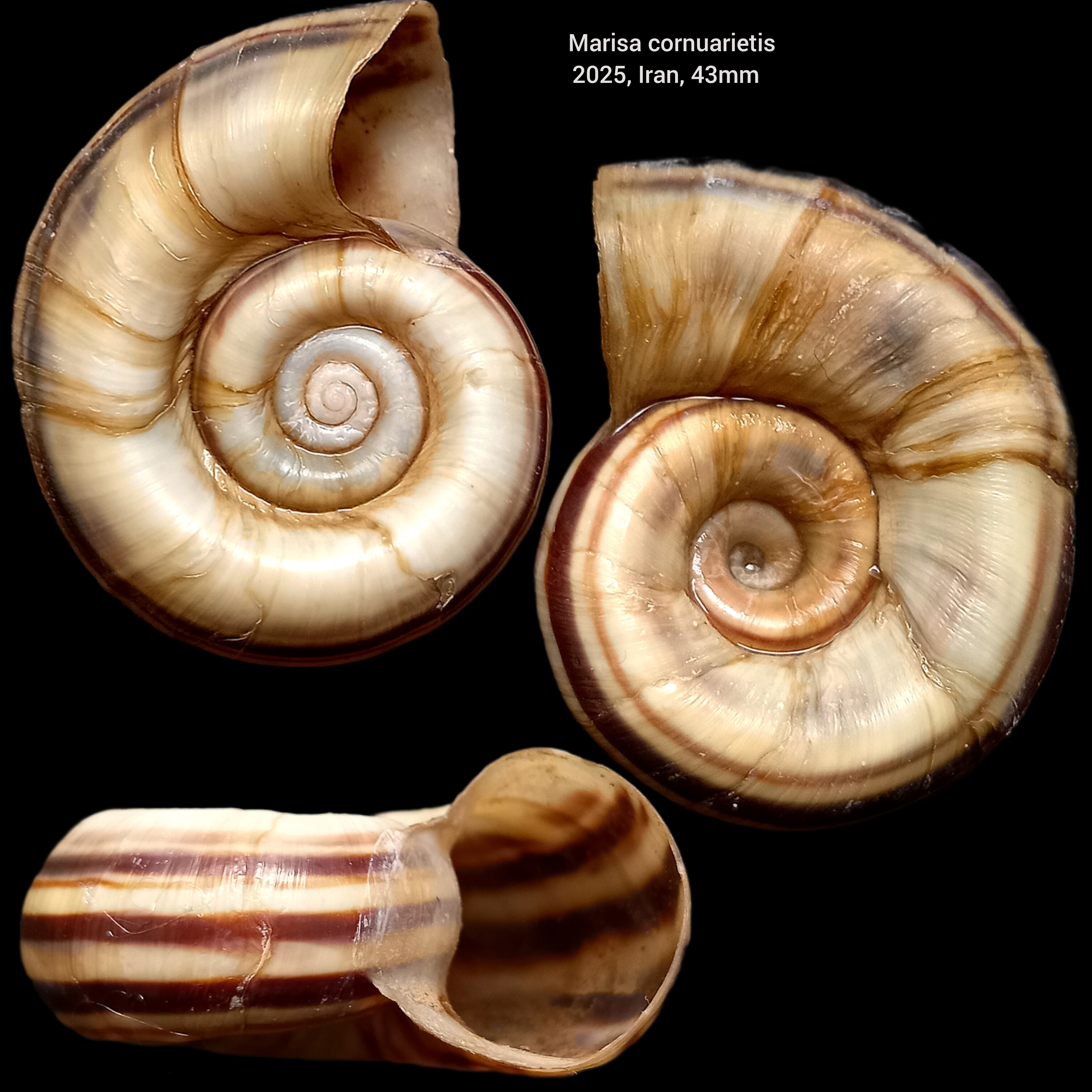
- Marisa cornuarietis

Scientific classification
- Kingdom: Animalia
- Phylum: Mollusca
- Class: Gastropoda
- Subclass: Caenogastropoda
- Order: Architaenioglossa
- Family: Ampullariidae
- Genus: Marisa; J. E. Gray, 1824

= Marisa (gastropod) =

Genus of gastropods

Marisa is a genus of freshwater snails in the family Ampullariidae, the apple snails.

== Species ==
There are two species:

- Marisa cornuarietis (Linnaeus, 1758)
- Marisa planogyra Pilsbry, 1933

== Phylogeny ==
Based on analysis of mitochondrial 12S ribosomal RNA, 16S ribosomal RNA, and the cytochrome-c oxidase I (COI) gene, M. cornuarietis is a sister clade to M. planogyra and Asolene spixii, indicating that genus Marisa is not monophyletic.
