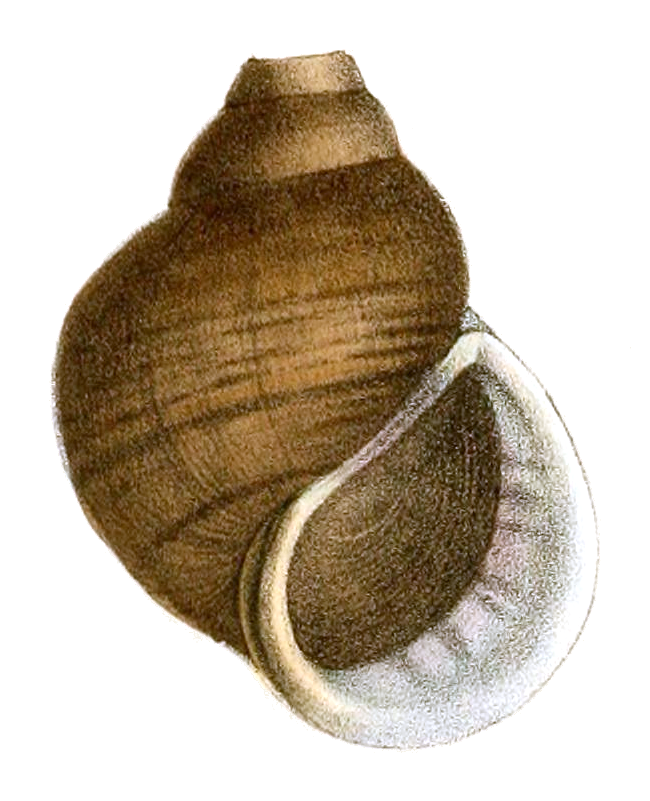
- A drawing of an apertural view of the shell of Asolene petiti

Scientific classification
- Kingdom: Animalia
- Phylum: Mollusca
- Class: Gastropoda
- Subclass: Caenogastropoda
- Order: Architaenioglossa
- Family: Ampullariidae
- Subfamily: Pomaceinae
- Genus: Asolene d'Orbigny, 1838

Diversity
- 7 species

= Asolene =

Genus of gastropods

Asolene is a genus of freshwater snails with an operculum, aquatic gastropod mollusks in the family Ampullariidae, the apple snails.

The distribution of the genus Asolene includes South America.

== Species ==
There were recognized seven species within the genus Asolene as of 2011, when Asolene included subgenus Pomella Gray, 1847.

There are recognized 7 species within the genus Asolene:

- Asolene crassa (Swainson, 1823)
- Asolene granulosa (G. B. Sowerby III, 1894)
- Asolene meta (Ihering, 1915)
- Asolene petiti (Crosse, 1891)
- Asolene platae (Maton, 1809) - type species
- Asolene pulchella (Anton, 1839)
- Asolene spixii (d'Orbigny, 1837)

synonyms:

- Asolene americana (v. Ihering, 1919) is a synonym of ...
- Asolene fairchildi (Clench, 1933) is a synonym of Pomacea sinamarina (Bruguière, 1792)
- Asolene megastoma (G. B. Sowerby I, 1825) is a synonym of Pomacea megastoma (G. B. Sowerby I, 1825)
