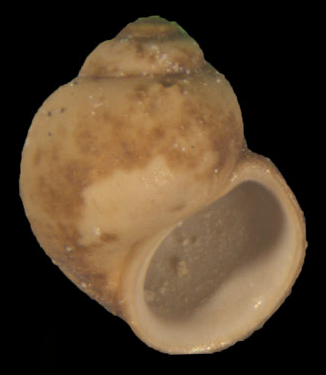
- Apertural view of a shell of Potamolithus troglobius (H = 2.5 mm)

Scientific classification
- Kingdom: Animalia
- Phylum: Mollusca
- Class: Gastropoda
- Subclass: Caenogastropoda
- Order: Littorinimorpha
- Family: Tateidae
- Genus: Potamolithus
- Species: P. troglobius

Binomial name
- Potamolithus troglobius Simone & Moracchioli, 1994

= Potamolithus troglobius =

Species of gastropod

Potamolithus troglobius is a species of freshwater snail with an operculum, an aquatic gastropod mollusk in the family Tateidae. A troglobitic species, meaning it is adapted to subterranean habitats, P. troglobius is endemic to the Areias cave system in southeastern Brazil.

== Distribution and habitat ==
This species is known exclusively from its type locality, the Ressurgência das Areias de Água Quente cave in Iporanga, São Paulo, Brazil. The cave is part of the Areias cave system, situated in the southwestern portion of the Lajeado-Bombas karst area, on the right bank of the Betari River. The Areias system includes other caves such as Areias de Cima and Areias de Baixo and is recognized for its rich subterranean biodiversity. P. troglobius is considered a troglobitic species, meaning it is an obligate cave-dweller, adapted to life in complete darkness.
