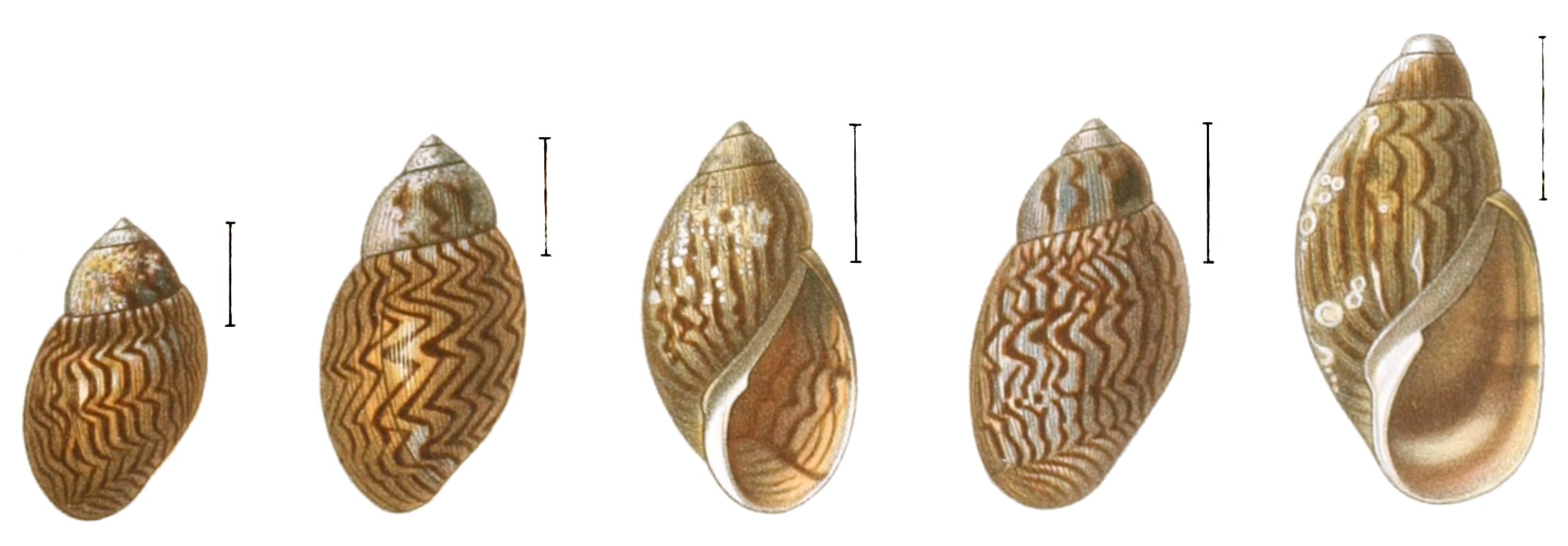
- Shells of Chilina fulgurata

Scientific classification
- Kingdom: Animalia
- Phylum: Mollusca
- Class: Gastropoda
- Superorder: Hygrophila
- Superfamily: Chilinoidea; H. Adams & A. Adams, 1855

Families
- Family Chilinidae; Family Latiidae

= Chilinoidea =

Superfamily of gastropods

Chilinoidea is a superfamily of air-breathing freshwater snails, pulmonate gastropod mollusks in the superorder Hygrophila.
