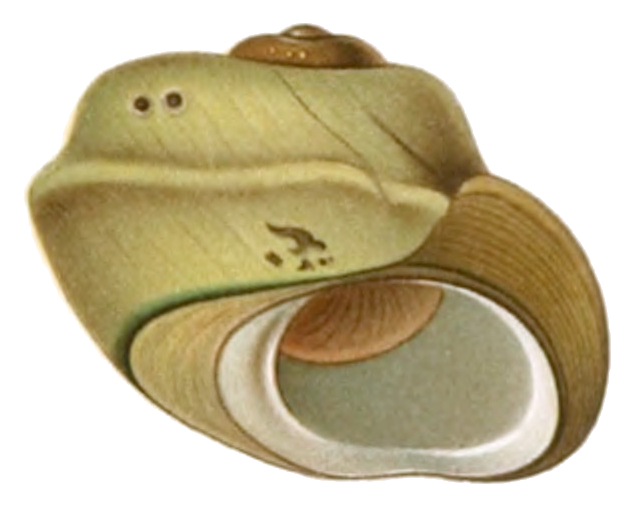
- Drawing of an apertural view of the shell of type specimen of Potamolithus rushii

Scientific classification
- Kingdom: Animalia
- Phylum: Mollusca
- Class: Gastropoda
- Subclass: Caenogastropoda
- Order: Littorinimorpha
- Family: Tateidae
- Genus: Potamolithus
- Species: P. rushii

Binomial name
- Potamolithus rushii Pilsbry, 1896

= Potamolithus rushii =

Species of gastropod

Potamolithus rushii is a species of freshwater snail with an operculum, an aquatic gastropod mollusk in the family Tateidae.

Potamolithus rushii is the type species of the genus Potamolithus.

The specific name rushii is in honor of Dr. William H. Rush (18??-1918), who collected this species.

== Distribution ==
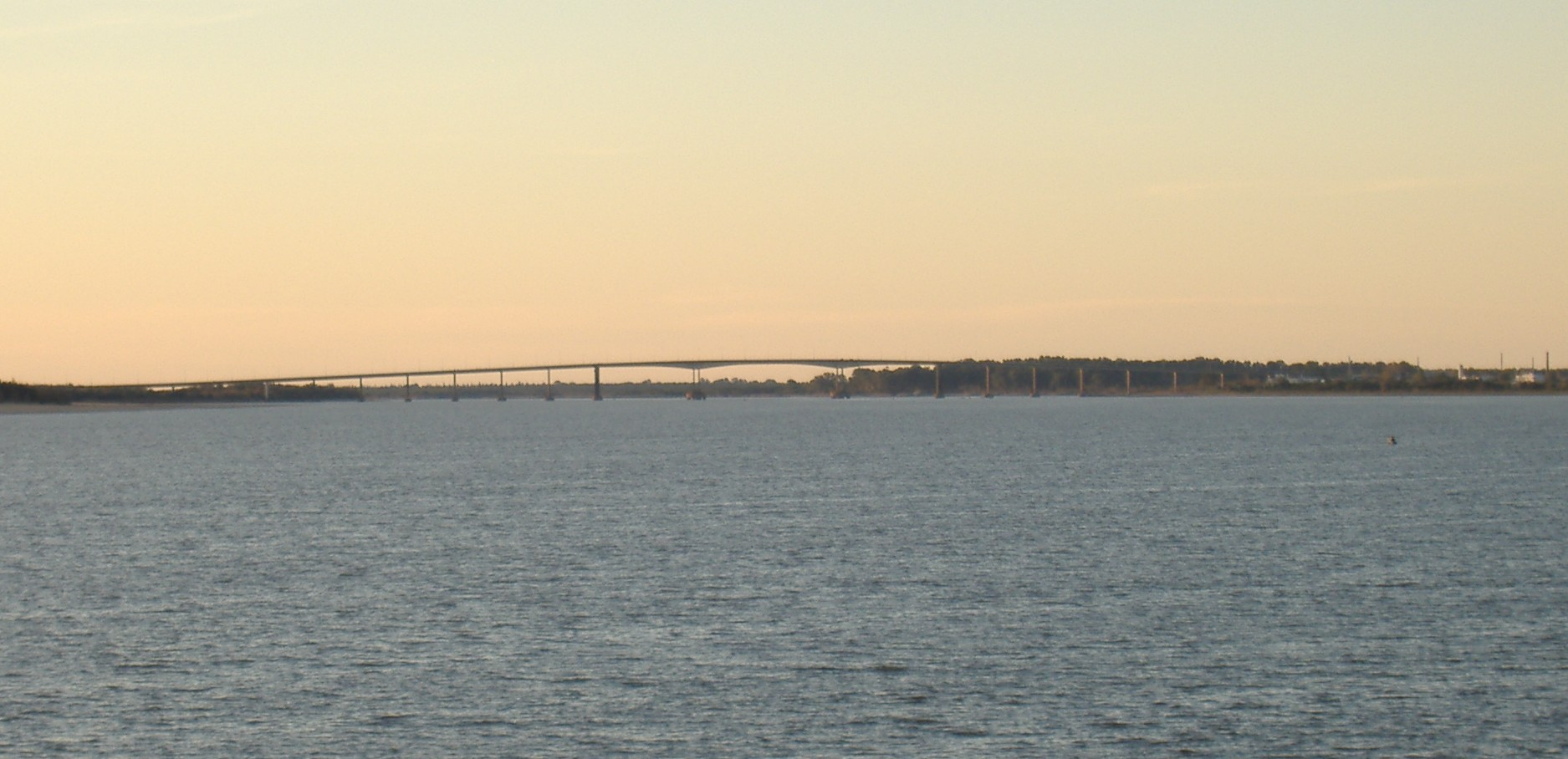
The Uruguay River near Paysandú where Potamolithus rushii occurs.

The distribution of Potamolithus rushii includes the Uruguay River near Paysandú (the type locality), Uruguay and Argentina.

== Description ==
Potamolithus rushii was originally described by the American malacologist Henry Augustus Pilsbry in 1896. Pilsbry's original text reads as follows:

Columella with a longitudinal groove or pit; outer lip with a strong varix.

Depressed; periphery with a strong, cord-like keel; back

of body whorl gibbous below suture; umbilical area moderate or large, bounded by a keel. Alt. 5.2, diam. 6 mm.

The shell of Potamolithus rushii is imperforate, wider than high, biconvex, very solid and strong. It is light green in color. The last half of the last whorl is dusky green. The keels are rather bright green. The early whorls are being dark reddish brown. The surface is somewhat glossy, with faint, fine growth-lines and barely perceptible spiral lines. The spire is convex, the apex is obtuse. The shell has 4 whorls, but the first whorl is eroded, leaving a pit, in all the adult shells seen. The whorls are convex, with seam-like sutures. In the latter part of the penultimate whorl the peripheral keel is usually visible at the suture. The last whorl has a very strong peripheral keel, the surface is being concave above and below it. Above the concavity the upper surface is convex, the convexity rising into a hump on the back, then disappearing, the last fourth of the whorl being flat. The base has a thick and prominent keel, defining a concave yellowish columellar area. The outer lip has a high, narrow varix at the edge. The aperture is very oblique, short-ovate, nearly circular, with a continuous, black-edged margin. The oblique columella is very broad, with a gutter or concavity near to and parallel with the inner margin. There is some variation in the degree of depression of the whole shell, the amplitude of the columellar area and in the prominence of the hump on the back, which is sometimes almost suppressed.

The width of the shell is 6.3 mm. The height of the shell is 4.3-5.1 mm.

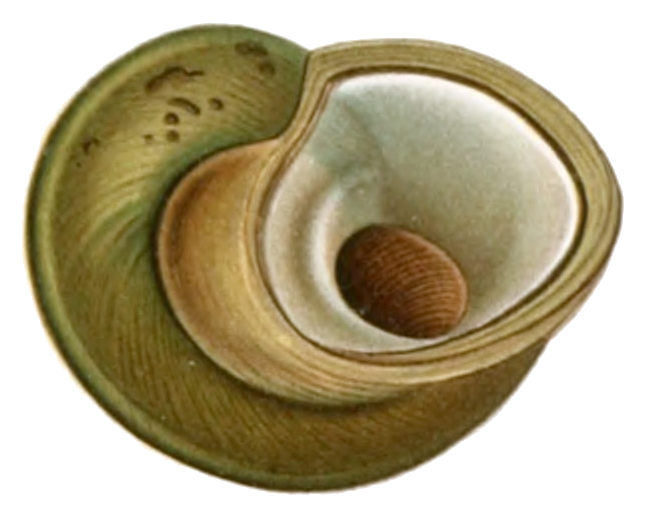
umbilical view of an adult shell, type specimen

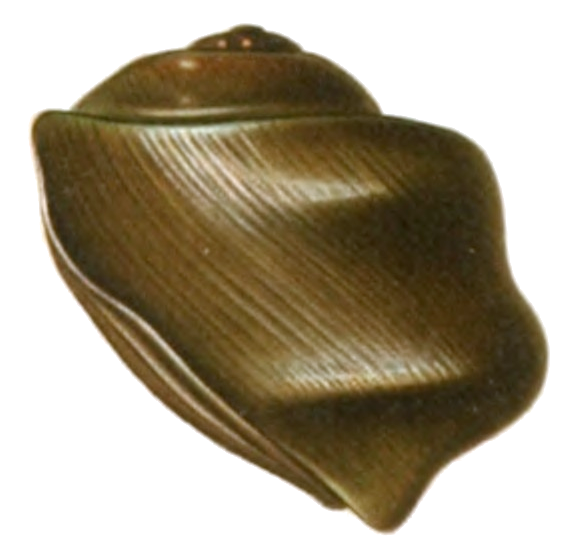
lateral view of an adult shell, type specimen

The relationship between Potamolithus rushii and Potamolithus iheringi is exceedingly interesting. The two species are similar in general color-scheme, in the varix, absence of more rapid descent of the suture towards the mouth, etc., but are totally diverse in contour, the one being carinate, the other smooth and naticoid. Yet it is significant that while Potamolithus iheringi has no trace of a peripheral keel, the green band occupies the same position as that coloring the keel in Potamolithus rushii.

== Life cycle ==
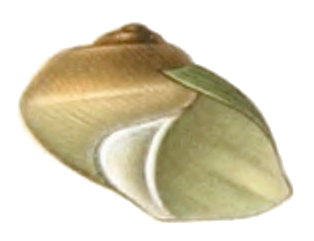
apertural view of a juvenile shell

The youngest specimens seen by Pilsbry had three whorls and a diameter of 3 mm. They had the depressed contour of adults and were strongly carinate peripherally, but the carina is distinctly weaker in front of the mouth, apparently indicating that it begins when the shell has nearly two whorls and a diameter of about a millimeter. At the 3 mm stage, the columella is very broad, semicircular, with a deep excavation and rod-like inner border (see image on the right). Very late in the neanic stage the basal keel appears, the shell then being about 5 mm in diameter; the columellar area is very narrow, at first linear. The rib or convexity of the upper surface is also of late appearance, these structures belong to the third neanic substage, the second, or unicarinate, substage thus occupying the greater part of the neanic stage. The discontinuation of the upper ridge or hump initiates the ephebic substage. The marginal varix and the absence of any tendency of the last whorl to descend or loosen its coil anteriorly, show that this species is at its acme. It has none of the stigmata of senility which are so manifest in Potamolithus microthauma, Potamolithus hidalgoi, etc.
