= Anisancylus dutrae =

Conservation status
- Least Concern (IUCN 3.1)

Scientific classification
- Kingdom: Animalia
- Phylum: Mollusca
- Class: Gastropoda
- Superorder: Hygrophila
- Family: Planorbidae
- Genus: Anisancylus
- Species: A. dutrae

Binomial name
- Anisancylus dutrae (Santos, 1994)

Synonyms
- Gundlachia dutrae Santos, 1994

Species of gastropod

Anisancylus dutrae is a species of small, freshwater, air-breathing limpet, an aquatic pulmonate gastropod mollusc in the family Planorbidae, the ram's horn snails and their allies.

== Etymology ==
The species name honours Dr. Ana Virginia C. Dutra of the Federal University of Pernambuco.

== Distribution ==
A. dutrae is endemic to Brazil, where it occurs in the northeastern states of Pernambuco and Bahia. The species' type locality is the Tapacurá Ecological Station in São Lourenço da Mata, Pernambuco.

== Description ==
A. dutrae has a high shell with an oval aperture, reaching 5 millimetres (0.20 in) in length. The apex is prominent, not pointed, dorsally flattened, bent to the right and back. The protoconch shows an apical depression and a small flat area, followed by irregularly arranged punctuations. The radial lines are imperceptible to optical microscopy. The teleoconch shows prominent radial lines across the surface of the shell and concentric, wavy fine lines. The mantle is pigmented, generally dark brown or black, except in the areas of muscle insertion (foot and tentacles). The right anterior muscle impression is elongated, extending to the midline of the body, with a median constriction. The left impression is elliptical, transversely arranged. The posterior impression is elliptical.

The radula shows marked characteristics. There is a quadricuspid rachidian tooth, the two main cusps being asymmetrical and aculeate. Beside each principal cusp there is one small accessory cusp. There are three principal cusps in the lateral teeth. The mesocone is the most developed, long and aculeate, while the endocone is relatively short. There is a big gap between the mesocone and the ectocone.

The ovotestis is wide, having about 35 unbranched, closely pressed follicles. The prostate has 4-5 follicles.

== Habitat ==
A. dutrae is found attached to the upper surface of stones in lotic habitats (such as small, fast-flowing streams).
