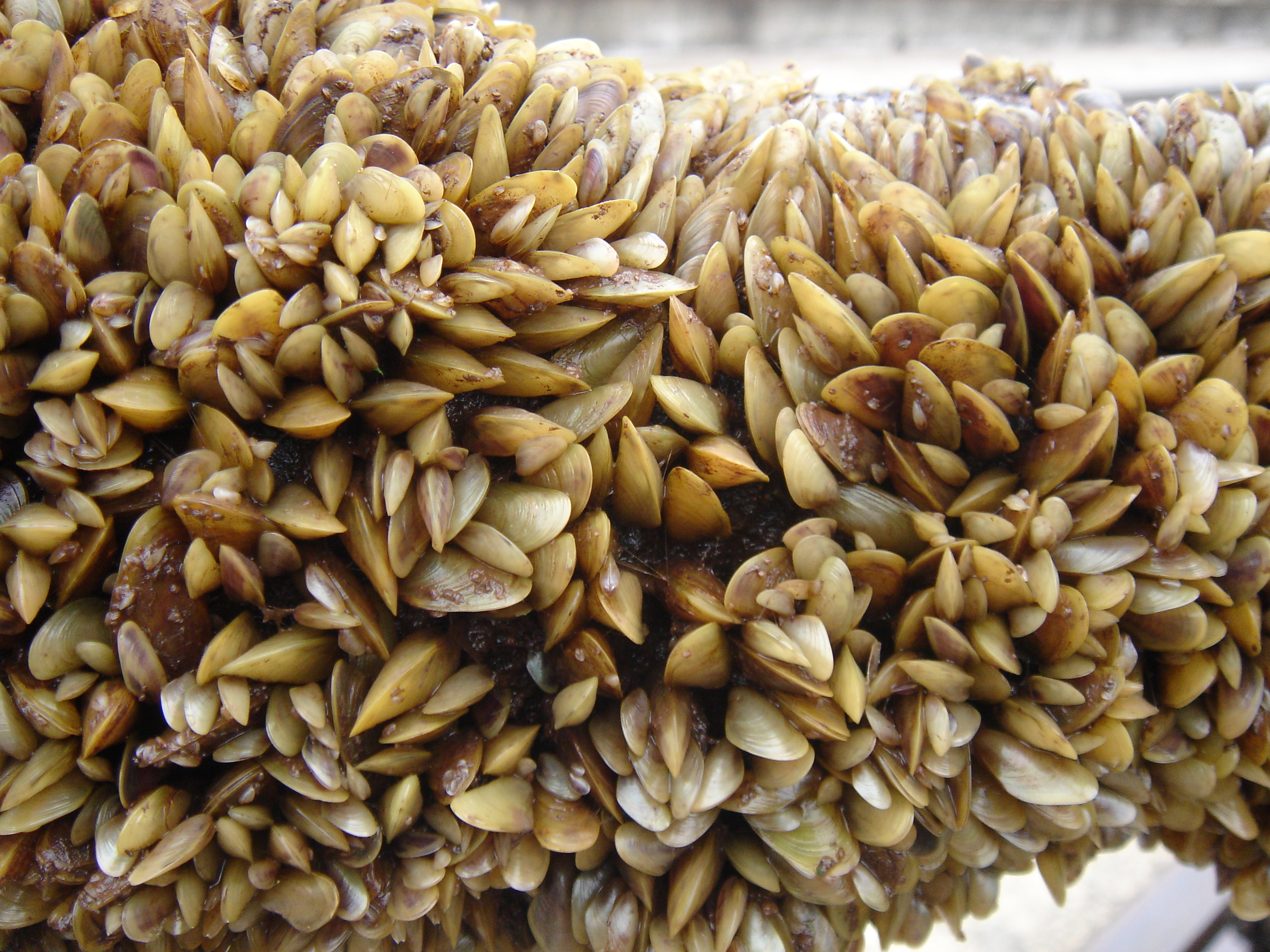
- Limnoperna fortunei

Scientific classification
- Kingdom: Animalia
- Phylum: Mollusca
- Class: Bivalvia
- Order: Mytilida
- Family: Modiolidae
- Genus: Limnoperna; Rochebrune, 1882

= Limnoperna =

Genus of bivalves

Limnoperna is a genus of bivalves belonging to the family Modiolidae.

The species of this genus are found in Southern America, Southeastern Asia and Australia.

Species:

- Limnoperna atrata (Lischke, 1871): synonym of Vignadula atrata (Lischke, 1871) (superseded combination)
- Limnoperna balani (Ockelmann, 1983): synonym of Vignadula mangle (Ockelmann, 1983) (junior subjective synonym)
- Limnoperna bogani Thach, 2023
- Limnoperna fortunei (Dunker, 1857)
- Limnoperna ngocngai Thach, 2023
- Limnoperna sambasensis (Dautzenberg, 1903)
- † Limnoperna sengokuensis Hase, 1960
- Limnoperna siamensis (Morelet, 1866)
- Limnoperna taprobanensis (Preston, 1915)

Synonyms

- Limnoperna inconstans (Dunker, 1856): synonym of Xenostrobus inconstans (Dunker, 1856)
- Limnoperna mangle (Ockelmann, 1983): synonym of Xenostrobus mangle Ockelmann, 1983 accepted as Vignadula mangle (Ockelmann, 1983)
- Limnoperna pulex (Lamarck, 1819): synonym of Xenostrobus pulex (Lamarck, 1819) (superseded combination)
- Limnoperna securis (Lamarck, 1819): synonym of Xenostrobus securis (Lamarck, 1819) (superseded combination)
- Limnoperna supoti Brandt, 1974: synonym of Limnoperna siamensis (Morelet, 1866) (junior synonym)
