= Anisancylus =

Scientific classification
- Kingdom: Animalia
- Phylum: Mollusca
- Class: Gastropoda
- Superorder: Hygrophila
- Family: Planorbidae
- Tribe: Ancylini
- Genus: Anisancylus; Pilsbry & Vanatta 1924

Species
- See text

Genus of gastropods

Anisancylus is a genus of small, freshwater, air-breathing limpets, aquatic pulmonate gastropod molluscs in the family Planorbidae, the ram's horn snails and their allies.

== Anatomy ==
These animals have a pallial lung, as do all pulmonate snails, but they also have a false gill or "pseudobranch" which can serve perfectly well as a gill when they are unable to reach the surface for air.

== Species ==
Species within the genus Anisancylus include:

- Anisancylus dutrae Santos, 1994
- Anisancylus obliquus Broderip & Sowerby, 1832
