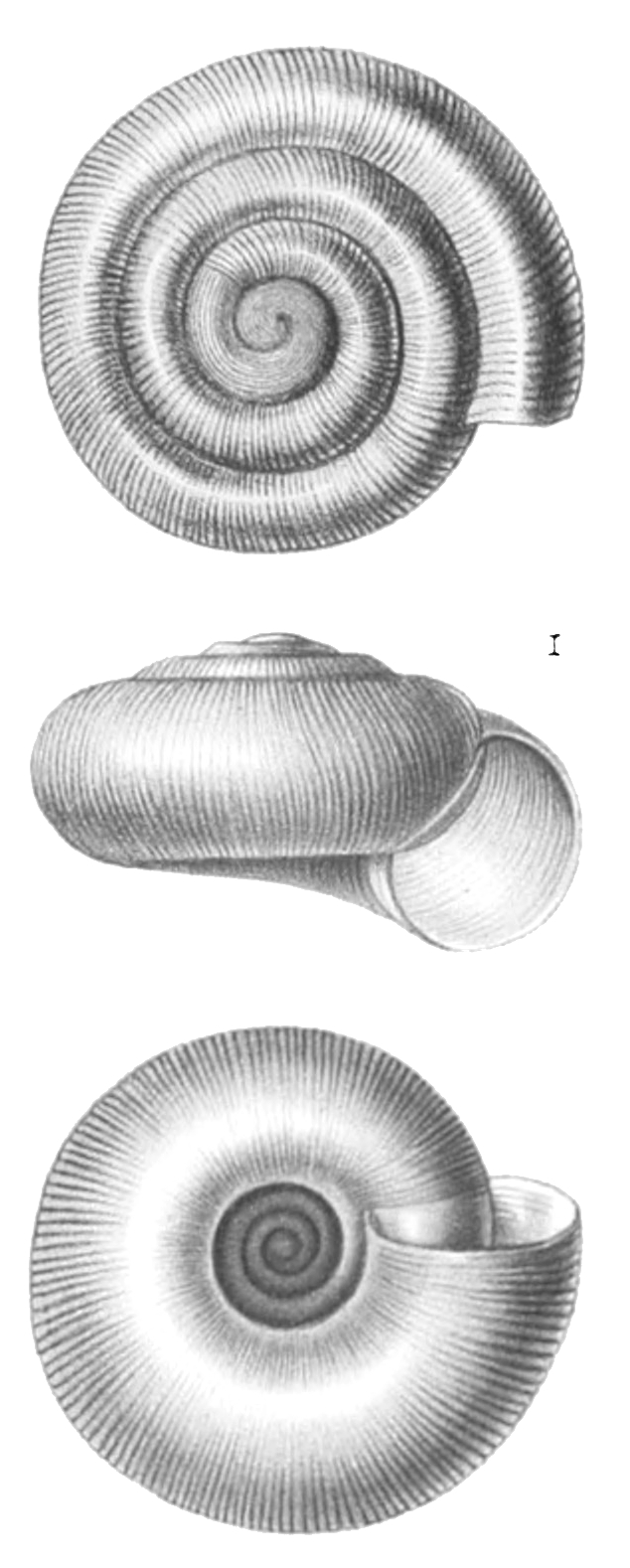
- The shell of Radiodiscus patagonicus.

Scientific classification
- Kingdom: Animalia
- Phylum: Mollusca
- Class: Gastropoda
- Order: Stylommatophora
- Family: Charopidae
- Genus: Radiodiscus; Pilsbry & Ferris, 1906

= Radiodiscus =

Genus of gastropods

Radiodiscus is a genus of small air-breathing land snail, a terrestrial gastropod mollusk in the family Charopidae.

== Species ==
The genus Radiodiscus includes the following species:

- Radiodiscus amoenus (Thiele, 1927)
- Radiodiscus bolachaensis Fonseca & Thomé, 1995 - synonym: Endodonta iheringi Thiele, 1927
- Radiodiscus compactus Suter, 1900
- Radiodiscus coppingers Smith, 1881
- Radiodiscus cuprinus Fonseca & Thomé, 2000
- Radiodiscus hollidayi Rutherford, 2020
- Radiodiscus iheringi (Ancey, 1899) - synonym: Stephanoda iheringi Ancey, 1899
- Radiodiscus millecostatus Pilsbry & Ferris, 1906 - type species
- Radiodiscus patagonicus (Suter, 1900)
- Rotadiscus pilsbryi Rehder, 1942
- Radiodiscus promatensis Miquel, Ramírez & Thomé, 2004
- Radiodiscus sanchicoensis Miquel, Ramírez & Thomé, 2007
- Radiodiscus tenellus Hylton Scott, 1957
- Radiodiscus thomei Weyrauch, 1965
- Radiodiscus ubtaoi Salvador, Charles, Simone & Maestrati, 2018
- Radiodiscus vazi Fonseca & Thomé, 1995
- Radiodiscus villarricensis Miquel & Baker, 2009
