= Radiodiscus coppingeri =

Conservation status
- Data Deficient (IUCN 2.3)

Scientific classification
- Kingdom: Animalia
- Phylum: Mollusca
- Class: Gastropoda
- Order: Stylommatophora
- Family: Charopidae
- Genus: Radiodiscus
- Species: R. coppingeri

Binomial name
- Radiodiscus coppingeri (Smith, 1881)

Species of gastropod

Radiodiscus coppingeri is a species of small air-breathing land snail, a terrestrial gastropod mollusk in the family Charopidae. This species is found in Brazil, Argentina, and Chile.
