= Chilina iguazuensis =

Conservation status
- Endangered (IUCN 3.1)

Scientific classification
- Kingdom: Animalia
- Phylum: Mollusca
- Class: Gastropoda
- Superorder: Hygrophila
- Genus: Chilina
- Species: C. iguazuensis

Binomial name
- Chilina iguazuensis Gregoric & Rumi, 2008

Species of gastropod

Chilina iguazuensis is a species of air-breathing freshwater snail, an aquatic pulmonate gastropod mollusk in the family Chilinidae.

The specific name iguazuensis is derived from the Iguazu River, where it lives.

== Distribution ==
Chilina iguazuensis is endemic to Iguazú National Park, Misiones Province, Argentina. It lives in the Upper Iguazú River there.

== Ecology ==
This snail species lives in the rapids of Upper Iguazú River.
