= Radiodiscus iheringi =

Conservation status
- Data Deficient (IUCN 2.3)

Scientific classification
- Kingdom: Animalia
- Phylum: Mollusca
- Class: Gastropoda
- Order: Stylommatophora
- Family: Charopidae
- Genus: Radiodiscus
- Species: R. iheringi

Binomial name
- Radiodiscus iheringi (Ancey, 1899)

Synonyms
- Stephanoda iheringi Ancey, 1899; Radiodiscus iheringi Smith, 1881 (authority error)

Species of gastropod

Radiodiscus iheringi is a species of small air-breathing land snail, a terrestrial pulmonate gastropod mollusk in the family Charopidae.

This species was discovered and described by César Marie Félix Ancey as Stephanoda iheringi in 1899.

Fonseca and Thomé (1995) recombined it to Radiodiscus iheringi (Ancey, 1899) while they accidentally synonymized it with a newly created name Radiodiscus bolachaensis.

Saldago and Coelho (2003) clarified the situation: Endodonta iheringi Thiele, 1927 is a synonym for Radiodiscus bolachaensis Fonseca & Thomé, 1995.

== Distribution ==
This species is found in Argentina, Brazil, and Uruguay.

The type locality is Rio Grande do Sul, Brazil.
