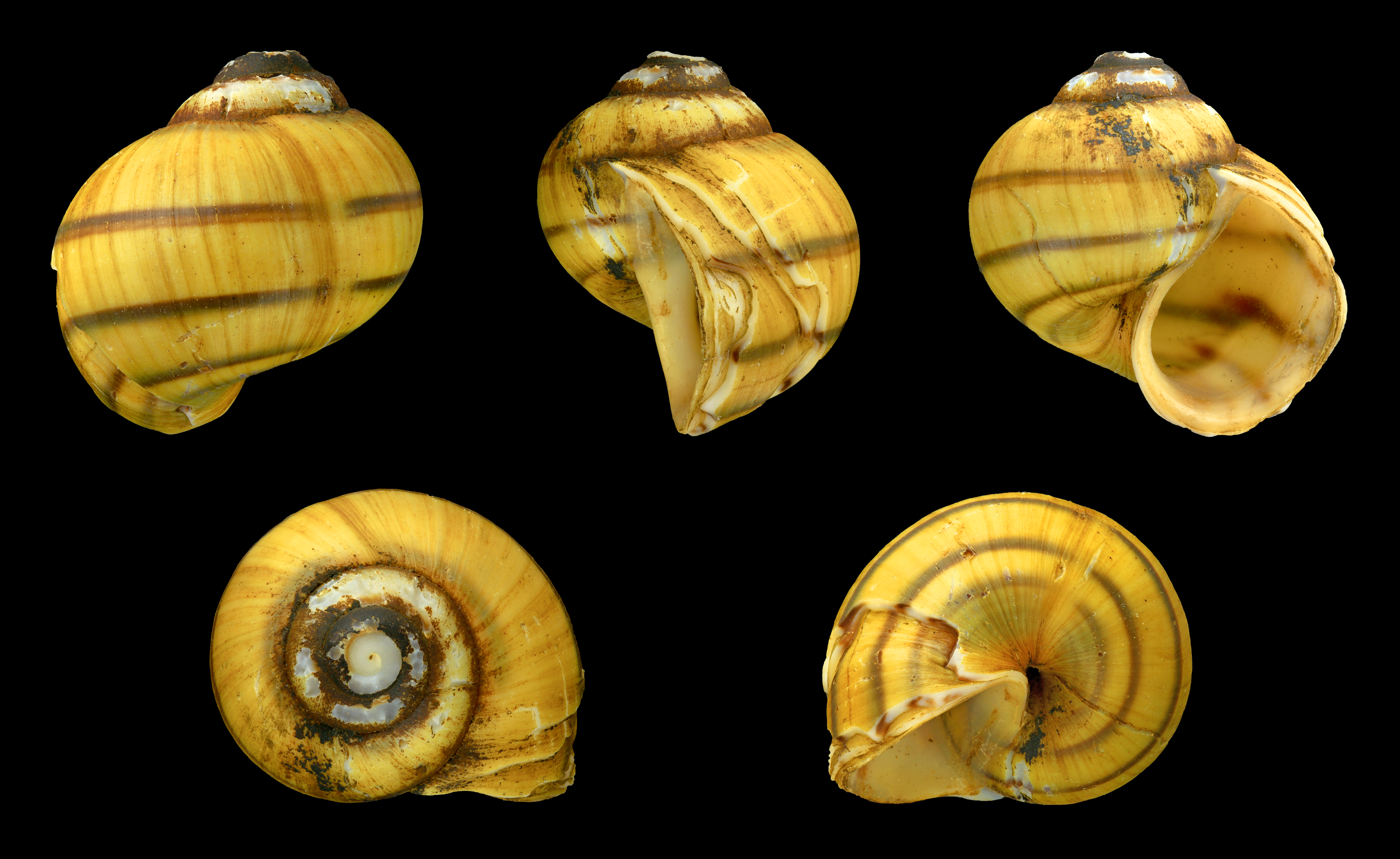

Conservation status
- Least Concern (IUCN 3.1)

Scientific classification
- Kingdom: Animalia
- Phylum: Mollusca
- Class: Gastropoda
- Subclass: Caenogastropoda
- Order: Architaenioglossa
- Family: Ampullariidae
- Genus: Asolene
- Species: A. pulchella

Binomial name
- Asolene pulchella (Anton, 1839)

= Asolene pulchella =

Species of gastropod

Asolene pulchella is a species of freshwater snail, an aquatic gastropod mollusk in the family Ampullariidae, the apple snails and their allies.

== Distribution ==
The distribution of Asolene pulchella includes:

- Argentina
- Bolivia
- Uruguay
