= Hebetancylus =

Scientific classification
- Kingdom: Animalia
- Phylum: Mollusca
- Class: Gastropoda
- Superorder: Hygrophila
- Family: Planorbidae
- Tribe: Ancylini
- Genus: Hebetancylus; Pilsbry, 1914

Species
- See text

Genus of gastropods

Hebetancylus is a genus of small, freshwater, air-breathing limpets, aquatic pulmonate gastropod molluscs in the family Planorbidae, the ram's horn snails and their allies.

== Anatomy ==
These animals have a pallial lung, as do all pulmonate snails, but they also have a false gill or "pseudobranch" which can serve perfectly well as a gill when they are unable to reach the surface for air.

== Species ==
Species within the genus Hebetancylus include:

- Hebetancylus excentricus (Morelet, 1851)
- Hebetancylus moricandi (d’Orbigny, 1837)
