= Radiodiscus compactus =

Conservation status
- Vulnerable (IUCN 2.3)

Scientific classification
- Kingdom: Animalia
- Phylum: Mollusca
- Class: Gastropoda
- Order: Stylommatophora
- Family: Charopidae
- Genus: Radiodiscus
- Species: R. compactus

Binomial name
- Radiodiscus compactus Suter, 1980

Species of gastropod

Radiodiscus compactus in Brazil

Radiodiscus compactus is a species of small air-breathing land snail, a terrestrial gastropod mollusk in the family Charopidae. This species is endemic to Brazil.
