= Hebetancylus moricandi =

Scientific classification
- Domain: Eukaryota
- Kingdom: Animalia
- Phylum: Mollusca
- Class: Gastropoda
- Superorder: Hygrophila
- Family: Planorbidae
- Genus: Hebetancylus
- Species: H. moricandi

Binomial name
- Hebetancylus moricandi (d'Orbigny, 1837)

Synonyms
- Gundlachia moricandi (d'Orbigny, 1837); Gundlachia leucaspis (Ancey, 1901)

Species of gastropod

Hebetancylus moricandi is a species of small, freshwater, air-breathing limpet, an aquatic pulmonate gastropod mollusc in the family Planorbidae, the ram's horn snails and their allies.

== Geographic distribution ==
H. moricandi is native to South America, where it is widely distributed, from northern Venezuela in the north to Río Colorado, Argentina, in the south. It has not been recorded in Chile, Ecuador, Colombia, Guyana and Suriname, however this absence may merely reflect lack of collections.

The species' type locality is Corrientes, Argentina.

== Description ==
H. moricandi has a low, compressed shell, reaching 13 millimetres (0.51 in) in length. The apex is obtuse, somewhat prominent, smooth and located slightly to the right of the midline. The protoconch shows a shallow apical depression and appears smooth under optical microscopy, but exhibits faint radial lines under scanning electron microscopy; no punctuations are present. The teleoconch shows no radial lines. The mantle is pigmented, with a band of increased pigmentation occurring between the area of the right anterior muscle insertion and the posterior pallial edge. The muscular impressions are almost of the same size, with the posterior one rounded and the anterior ones rounded or slightly almond-like. The rachidian tooth has a high base, wider at the most basal portion, and robust but relatively short main cusps, with one to two accessory cusps to their side and, occasionally, an accessory cusp between them. The lateral teeth are tricuspid, the three main cusps being of similar size and having one small accessory cusp between them and one to three to the side of the ectocone. The marginal teeth are elongated and have 10 to 15 very fine cusps. The ovotestis usually has more than 30 follicles. The prostate has 6 to 9 long and curved follicles.

== See also ==
- List of non-marine molluscs of Venezuela
- List of non-marine molluscs of Brazil
- List of non-marine molluscs of Argentina
- List of non-marine molluscs of Uruguay
