= Trochogyra leptotera =

Conservation status
- Data Deficient (IUCN 2.3)

Scientific classification
- Kingdom: Animalia
- Phylum: Mollusca
- Class: Gastropoda
- Order: Stylommatophora
- Family: Charopidae
- Genus: Trochogyra
- Species: T. leptotera

Binomial name
- Trochogyra leptotera Rochebrune & Mabille, 1882

Species of gastropod

Trochogyra leptotera is a species of small air-breathing land snail, a terrestrial pulmonate gastropod mollusk in the family Charopidae.

== Distribution ==
This species is found in Argentina, Brazil, Chile, Paraguay, and Uruguay.
