= Chilina elegans =

Scientific classification
- Kingdom: Animalia
- Phylum: Mollusca
- Class: Gastropoda
- Superorder: Hygrophila
- Genus: Chilina
- Species: C. elegans

Binomial name
- Chilina elegans Frauenfeld, 1865

Species of gastropod

Chilina elegans is an air-breathing freshwater snail species in the genus Chilina. It is found in Chile.
