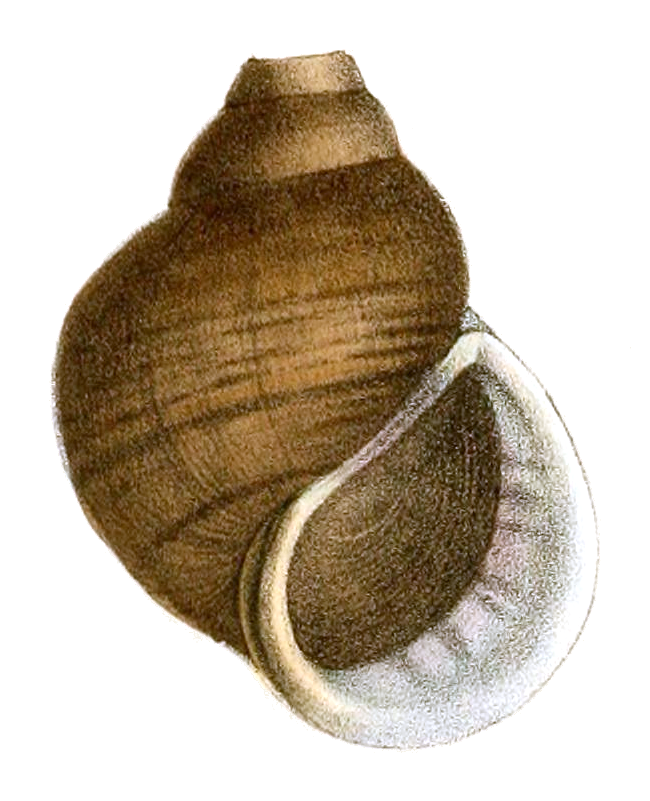
- A drawing of an apertural view of the shell of Asolene petiti

Conservation status
- Least Concern (IUCN 3.1)

Scientific classification
- Kingdom: Animalia
- Phylum: Mollusca
- Class: Gastropoda
- Subclass: Caenogastropoda
- Order: Architaenioglossa
- Family: Ampullariidae
- Genus: Asolene
- Species: A. petiti

Binomial name
- Asolene petiti (Crosse, 1891)

Synonyms
- Ampullaria petiti Crosse, 1891 (original combination)

= Asolene petiti =

Species of mollusc

Asolene petiti is a species of freshwater snail, an aquatic gastropod mollusk in the family Ampullariidae, the apple snails and their allies.

The specific name petiti is in honor of Emil Charles Nicolai Petit (1817–1893), who collected this snail.

== Distribution ==
The distribution of Asolene petiti includes Brazil. Specifically, Mato Grosso.
