= Felipponea =

Scientific classification
- Kingdom: Animalia
- Phylum: Mollusca
- Class: Gastropoda
- Subclass: Caenogastropoda
- Order: Architaenioglossa
- Family: Ampullariidae
- Genus: Felipponea (Dall, 1919)

Genus of gastropods

Felipponea is a genus of freshwater snails that have a gill and an operculum, aquatic gastropod mollusks in the family Ampullariidae, the apple snails.

== Species ==
The genus Felipponea includes 3 species:

- Felipponea elongata (Dall, 1921)
- Felipponea iheringi (Pilsbry, 1933)
- Felipponea neritiniformis (Dall, 1919) - type species (synonym: Felipponea neritiformis (Dall, 1919))
