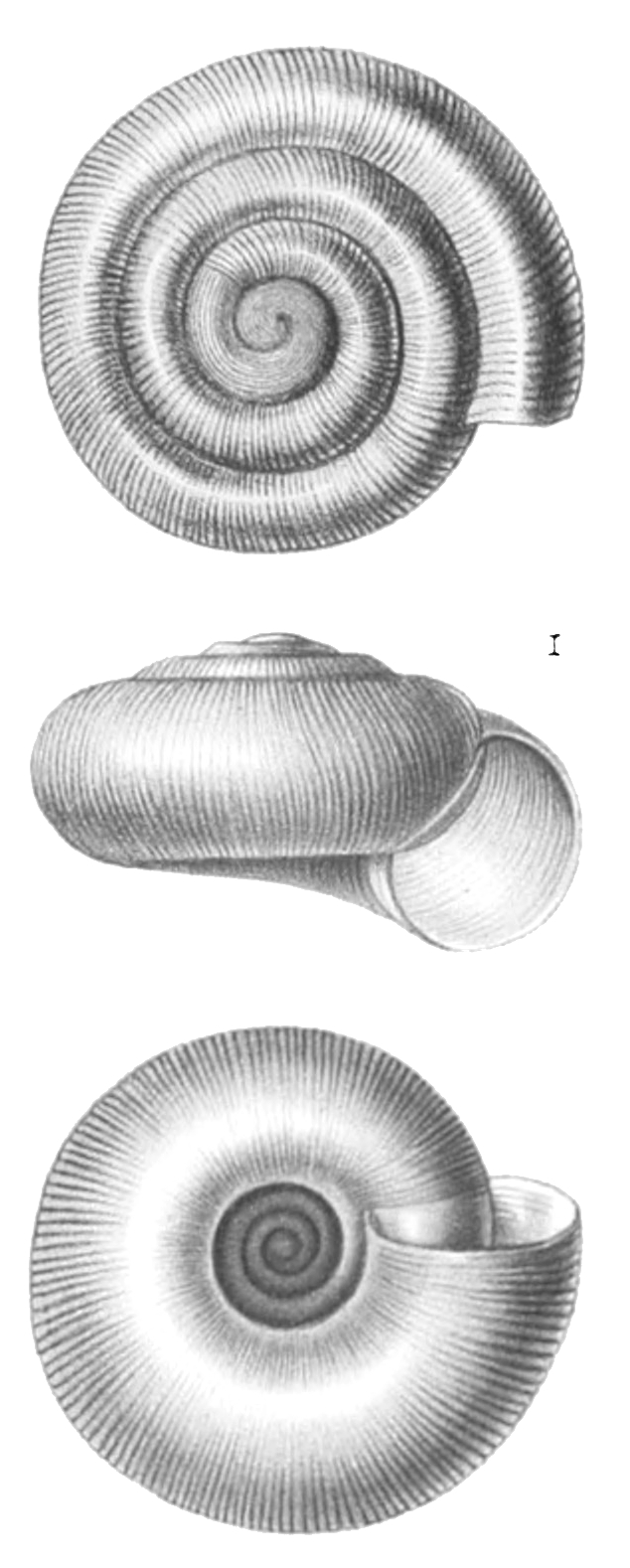
- Three views of a shell of Radiodiscus patagonicus

Scientific classification
- Kingdom: Animalia
- Phylum: Mollusca
- Class: Gastropoda
- Order: Stylommatophora
- Family: Charopidae
- Genus: Radiodiscus
- Species: R. patagonicus

Binomial name
- Radiodiscus patagonicus (Suter, 1900)

Synonyms
- Pyramidula patagonica Suter, 1900; Stephanoda patagonica

= Radiodiscus patagonicus =

Species of gastropod

Radiodiscus patagonicus is a minute species of air-breathing land snail, a terrestrial gastropod mollusk or micromollusk in the family Charopidae.

== Distribution ==
This species occurs in countries including:

- Brazil
- Patagonia

The type locality is Santa Cruz near Mt. of Observation on the Rio Chico 50 miles above Sierra Oveja, on a dry stone near the water (according to F. von Ihering). Spring near base of the Andes, 65 miles north of the Rio Chico, elevation 2400 ft. Banks of a small stream 10 miles from Ushe Lake (according to the J. B. Hatcher).

== Shell description ==
The shell is openly umbilicate (the umbilicus about one-fourth the total diameter), of a uniform pale brown tint, discoidal. The spire is convex but low. Suture is deeply impressed. The shell has 3 ½ whorls, that are convex, slowly increasing, the embryonic 1 ½ densely striate spirally, the rest radially costellate. The riblets are about as wide as their intervals, about 25 ribblets in 1 mm. on the last half of the last whorl. Under the microscope some very minute striations may be seen upon the ribs, and in places an extremely minute and very faint spiral striation. The rotund-lunate aperture is slightly oblique.

The width of the adult shell is about 1.7-1.8 mm, the height is 0.9-1.2 mm.

The above description and the figures are from a shell collected alive 50 miles above the Sierra Oveja.

The original description, in Portuguese, was based upon fossil specimens, which had lost the color and part of the finer sculpture. The original lot of Radiodiscus patagonicus was from Santa Cruz, on the coast, in a modern deposit. Specimen from original lot are a little larger than the living shell described, with the whorls slightly deeper.
