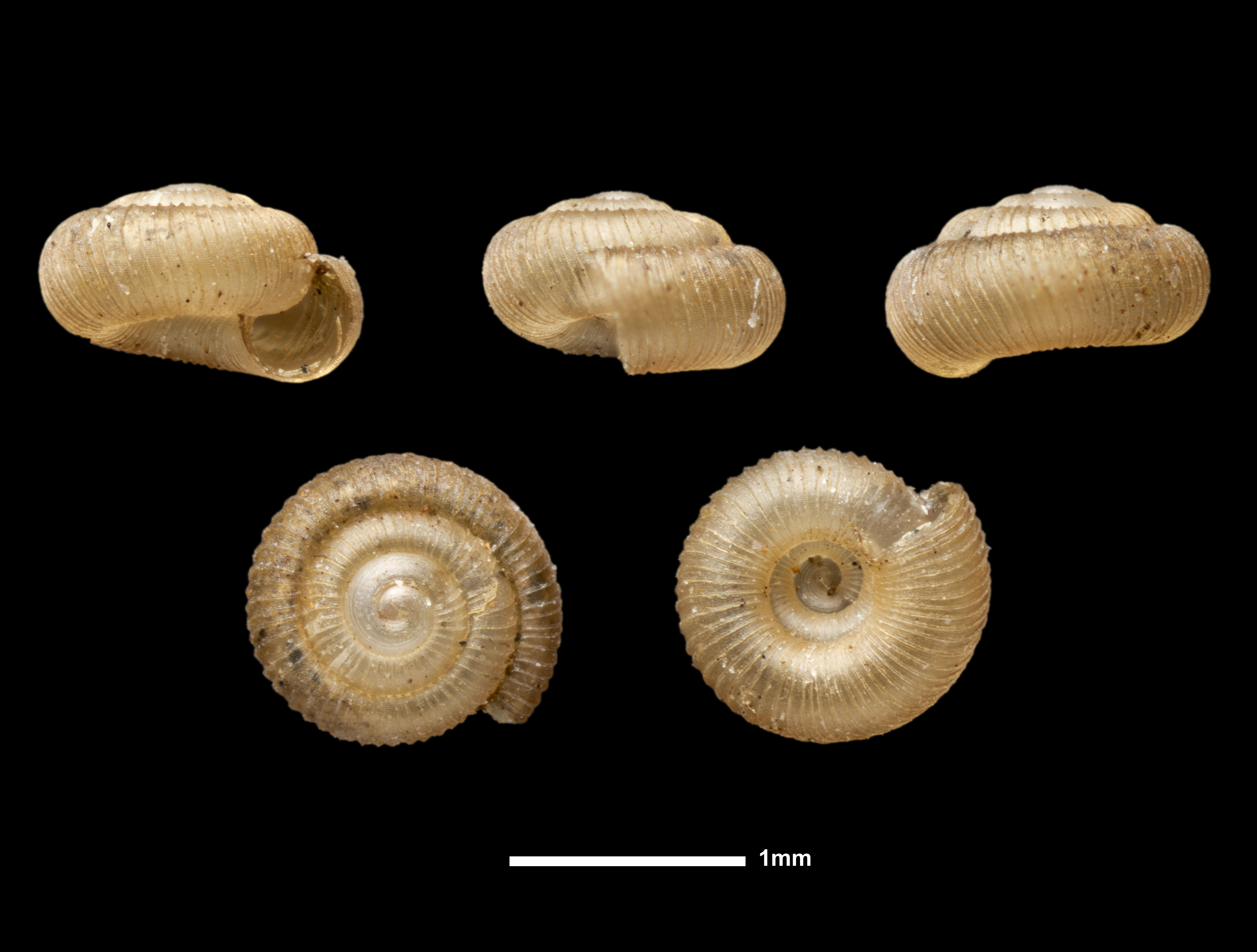
- Five views of a shell of Radiodiscus hollidayi

Scientific classification
- Kingdom: Animalia
- Phylum: Mollusca
- Class: Gastropoda
- Order: Stylommatophora
- Family: Charopidae
- Genus: Radiodiscus
- Species: R. hollidayi

Binomial name
- Radiodiscus hollidayi Rutherford, 2020

= Radiodiscus hollidayi =

Species of gastropod

Radiodiscus hollidayi is a minute species of air-breathing land snail, a terrestrial gastropod mollusk or micromollusk in the family Charopidae.

== Distribution ==
This species is currently only known from the island of Trinidad in Trinidad and Tobago.

The type locality is alongside the North Coast Road, San Juan-Laventille region, Trinidad, in leaf litter.
