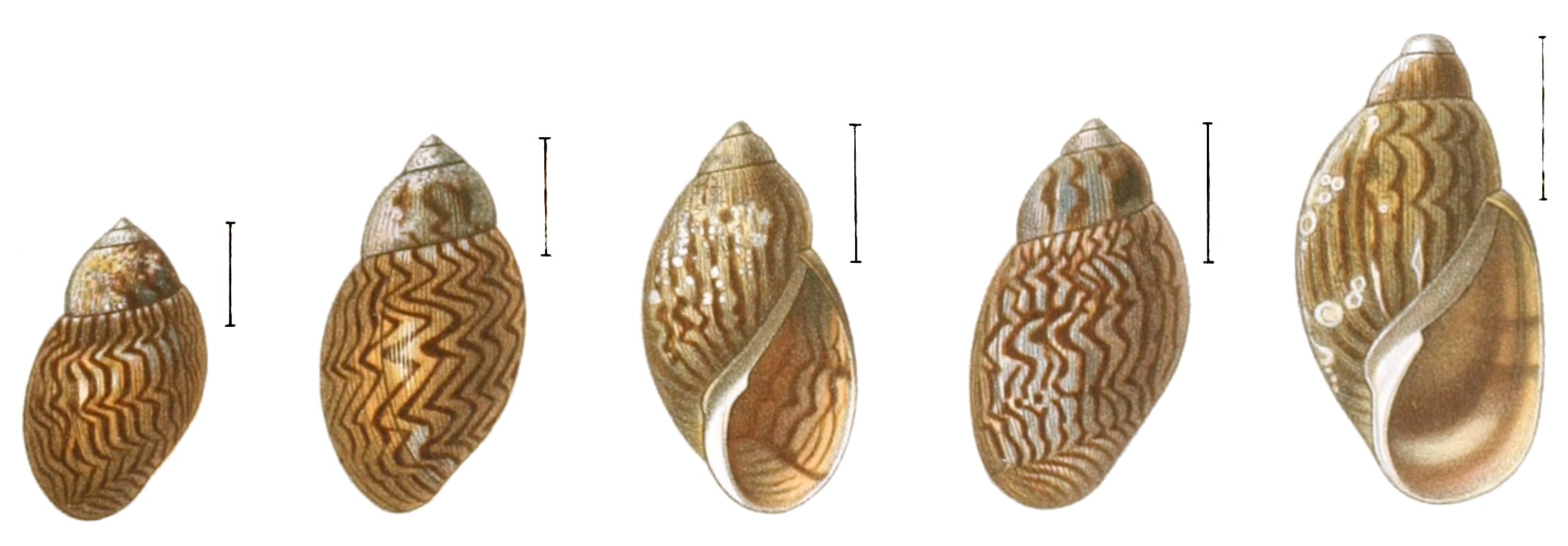
- Shells of Chilina fulgurata

Scientific classification
- Kingdom: Animalia
- Phylum: Mollusca
- Class: Gastropoda
- Superorder: Hygrophila
- Superfamily: Chilinoidea
- Genus: Chilina; Gray, 1828

Diversity
- 17 freshwater species

Synonyms
- Acyrogonia Mabille & Rochebrune, 1889; Auricula (Chilina) Gray, 1828 (original rank); Diplicaria Rafinesque, 1833; Dombeia d'Orbigny, 1837; Dombeya (incorrect subsequent spelling); Pseudochilina Dall, 1870

= Chilina =

Genus of gastropods

Chilina is a genus of air-breathing freshwater snails, aquatic pulmonate gastropod mollusks in the superfamily Chilinoidea.

Chilina is the only genus in the family Chilinidae.

== Distribution ==
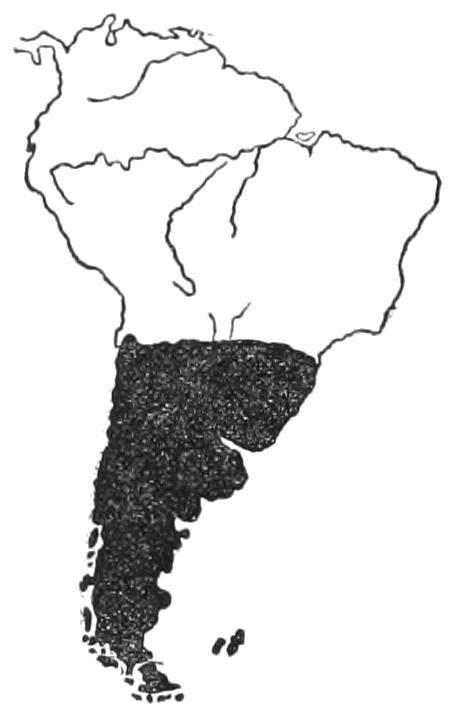
Map of distribution of Chilinidae.

Chilinidae occupies the temperate and cold zones of South America from the Tropic of Capricorn to Cape Horn and Falkland Islands. Distribution of Chilina include Argentina (17 species, 12 of them are endemic), Uruguay (2 species), Brazil (about 4 species).

== Taxonomy ==
The family Chilinidae has been classified in the clade Hygrophila within the informal group Basommatophora (according to the taxonomy of the Gastropoda by Bouchet & Rocroi, 2005). There are no subfamilies.

== Species ==
Species within the genus Chilina include:

- Chilina acuminata G. B. Sowerby II, 1874
- Chilina amoena E. A. Smith, 1882
- Chilina ampullacea G. B. Sowerby I, 1838
- Chilina angusta (Philippi, 1860)
- Chilina aurantia Marshall, 1924
- Chilina bullocki W. B. Marshall, 1933
- Chilina bulloides d'Orbigny, 1835
- Chilina campylaxis Pilsbry, 1911
- Chilina cuyana Gutiérrez Gregoric, Ciocco & Rumi, 2014
- Chilina dombeiana (Bruguière, 1789)
- Chilina elegans Frauenfeld, 1865
- Chilina falklandica Cooper & Preston
- Chilina fasciata (Gould, 1847)
- Chilina fluctuosa (Gray, 1828): nomen inquirendum
- Chilina fluminea (Maton, 1809)
- Chilina fuegiensis E. A. Smith, 1905
- Chilina fulgurata Pilsbry, 1911
- Chilina fusca Mabille, 1884
- Chilina gallardoi Castellanos & Gaillard, 1981
- Chilina gibbosa G. B. Sowerby I, 1841
- Chilina globosa Frauenfeld, 1881
- Chilina guaraniana Castellanos & Miquel, 1980
- Chilina iguazuensis Gregoric & Rumi, 2008
- Chilina lebruni Mabille, 1884
- Chilina lilloi Ovando & Gutiérrez Gregoric, 2012
- Chilina limnaeiformis Dall, 1870
- Chilina llanquihuensis W. B. Marshall, 1933
- Chilina major G. B. Sowerby I, 1838 (taxon inquirendum)
- Chilina megastoma Hylton Scott, 1958
- Chilina mendozana Ströbel, 1874
- Chilina minuta Haas, 1951
- Chilina monticola Strebel, 1907
- Chilina nervosa (Mabille & Rochebrune, 1889)
- Chilina neuquenensis Marshall, 1933
- Chilina obovata (Gould, 1847)
- Chilina olivacea W. B. Marshall, 1924
- Chilina ovalis G. B. Sowerby I, 1838
- Chilina parchappii (d'Orbigny, 1835)
- Chilina parva Martens, 1868
- Chilina patagonica Sowerby II, 1874
- Chilina perrieri Mabille, 1833
- Chilina portillensis Hidalgo, 1880
- Chilina puelcha d'Orbigny, 1838
- Chilina pulchella d'Orbigny, 1835
- Chilina robustior G. B. Sowerby I, 1838
- Chilina rushii Pilsbry, 1911
- Chilina sanjuanina Gutiérrez Gregoric, Ciocco & Rumi, 2014
- Chilina smithi Pilsbry, 1911
- Chilina strebeli Pilsbry, 1911
- Chilina subcylindrica G. B. Sowerby II, 1874
- Chilina tehuelcha d'Orbigny, 1837
- Chilina tenuis G. B. Sowerby I, 1838
- Chilina tucumanensis Castellanos & Miquel, 1980

== Ecology ==
Within their area, the Chilinidae are abundant snails in all suitable stations, as Physidae are in North America. They swarm in springs, small streams, lakes, and in some places the margins of rivers. They are most abundant southward, becoming rarer and local toward the northern borders of their range.

Chilina gibbosa and Chilina fluminea are medically important, because they transfer parasites causing dermatitis.
