= Hebetancylus excentricus =

Conservation status
- Secure (NatureServe)

Scientific classification
- Kingdom: Animalia
- Phylum: Mollusca
- Class: Gastropoda
- Superorder: Hygrophila
- Family: Planorbidae
- Genus: Hebetancylus
- Species: H. excentricus

Binomial name
- Hebetancylus excentricus (Morelet, 1851)

Synonyms
- Ancylus excentricus Morelet, 1851; Ancylus excentricus var. biolleyi von Martens, 1899; Ancylus excentricus var. pittieri von Martens, 1899; Ferrissia (Laevapex) excentrica (Morelet, 1851); Ferrissia (Laevapex) excentrica biolleyi (von Martens, 1899); Ferrissia (Laevapex) excentrica pittieri (von Martens, 1899); Velletia excentrica (Morelet, 1851)

Species of gastropod

Hebetancylus excentricus, the excentric ancylid, is a species of small, freshwater, air-breathing limpet, an aquatic pulmonate gastropod mollusc or micromollusc in the family Planorbidae, the ram's horn snails and their allies.

== Geographic distribution ==
H. excentricus is widely distributed across North and Central America and the Caribbean. The main area of its North American range extends from Florida to Texas, but it has also been reported from scattered ponds and river backwaters along the length of the southern Atlantic Coastal Plain as far north as North Carolina. This pattern of contagious distribution suggests that the species is possibly being dispersed through the air by migratory waterfowl.

== Habitat and ecology ==
H. excentricus usually occurs on rocks in fast-flowing streams and occasionally on rocks and rooted aquatic vegetation in lakes and the impounded backwaters of rivers and streams. It also occurs on submerged sticks, logs, and large items of organic debris.

Annual, bi- and trivoltine life cycles have been reported in Louisiana and Texas populations of H. excentricus; however, this increased number of generations occurs without an increase in population growth rates.
