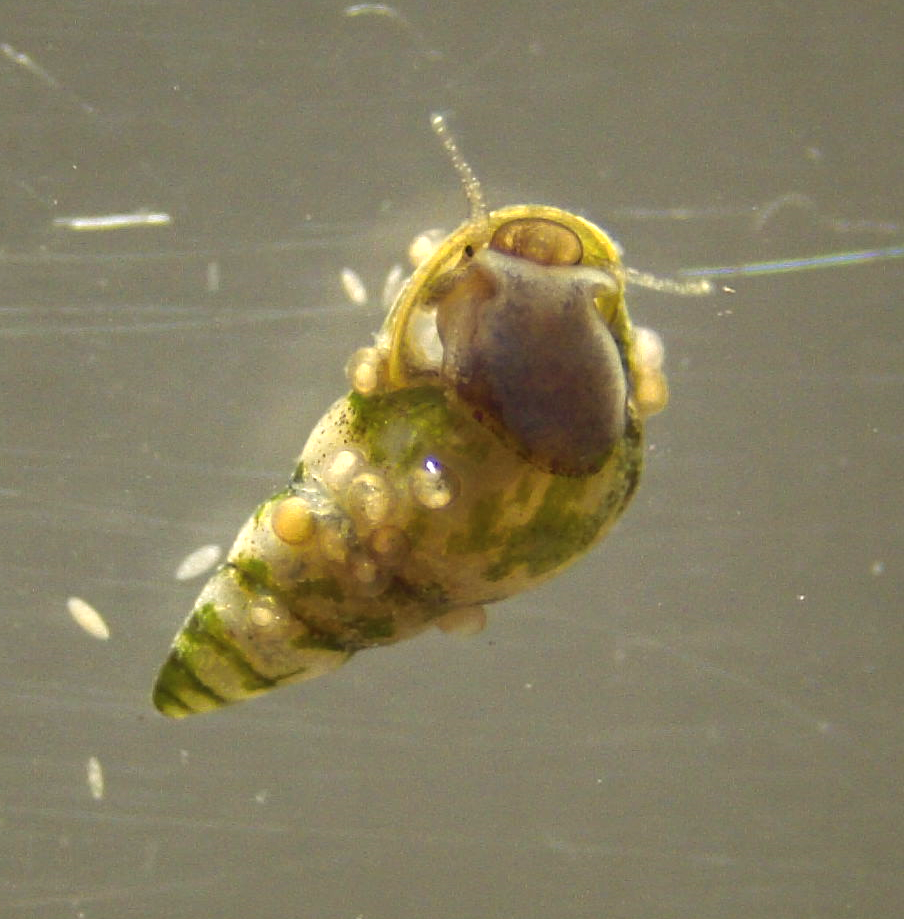

Scientific classification
- Kingdom: Animalia
- Phylum: Mollusca
- Class: Gastropoda
- Subclass: Caenogastropoda
- Order: Littorinimorpha
- Family: Cochliopidae
- Genus: Heleobia
- Species: H. parchappii

Binomial name
- Heleobia parchappii (d'Orbigny, 1835)

Synonyms
- Heleobia occidentalis (Doering, 1885); Heleobia vianai (Parodiz, 1960); Littoridina parchapii d'Orbigny, 1835

= Heleobia parchappii =

Species of gastropod

Heleobia parchappii is a species of small freshwater snail, an operculate gastropod mollusc in the family Cochliopidae.

== Distribution ==
Argentina and Uruguay.

== Ecology ==
Parasites of Heleobia parchappii include trematode Lobatostoma jungwirthi.
