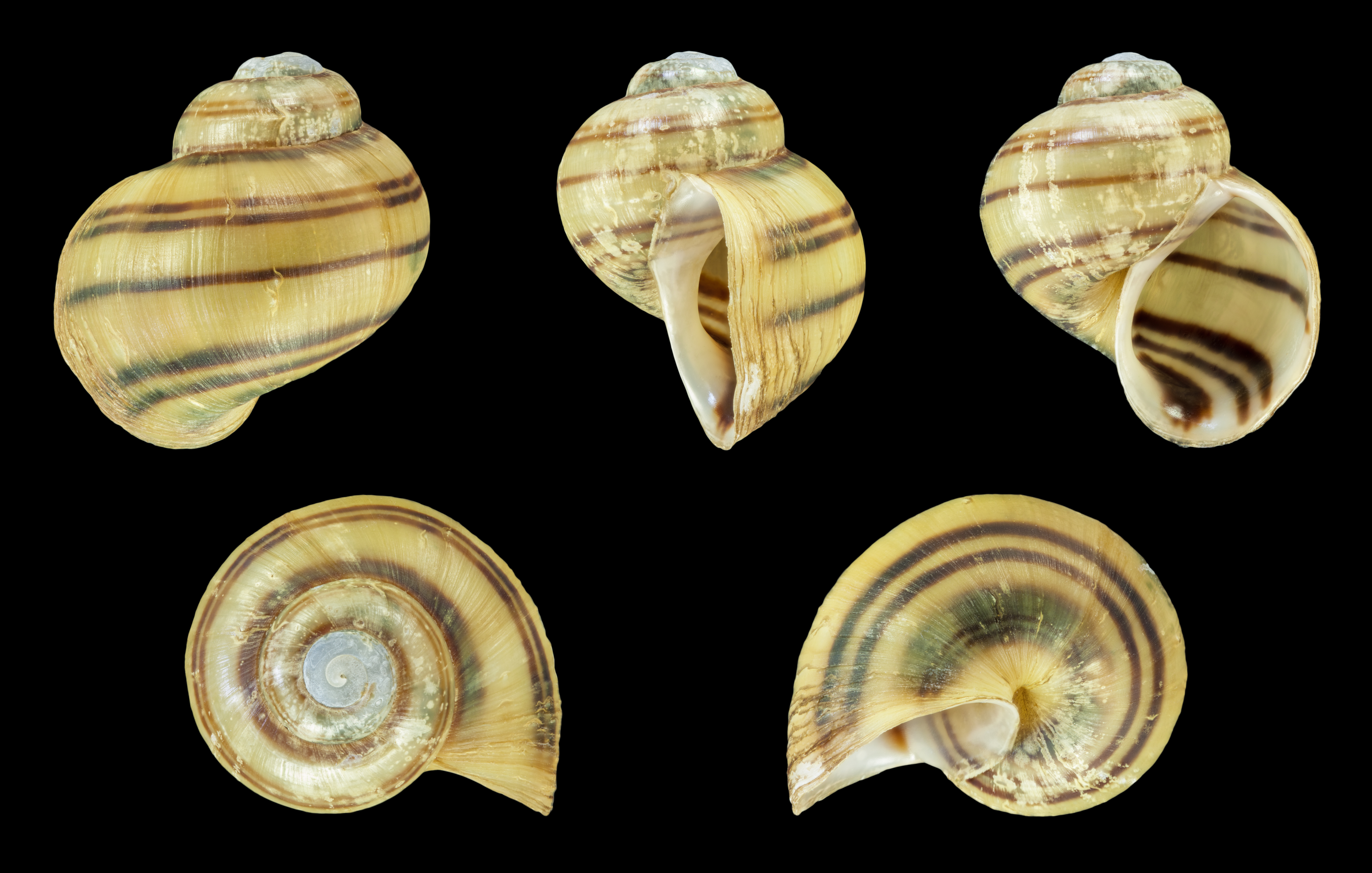

Scientific classification
- Kingdom: Animalia
- Phylum: Mollusca
- Class: Gastropoda
- Subclass: Caenogastropoda
- Order: Architaenioglossa
- Family: Ampullariidae
- Genus: Asolene
- Species: A. spixii

Binomial name
- Asolene spixii (d'Orbigny, 1838)

Synonyms
- Ampullaria spixii d'Orbigny, 1838 (original combination); Ampullaria zonata d'Orbigny, 1835 (invalid: junior homonym of Ampullaria zonata Spix, 1827; A. spixii is a replacement name)

= Asolene spixii =

Species of gastropod

Asolene spixii is a species of freshwater snail, an aquatic gastropod mollusk in the family Ampullariidae, the apple snails.

The specific name spixii is in honour of German biologist Johann Baptist von Spix.

It is often misspelled as Asolene spixii.

It can eat animals of the genus Hydra.

== Distribution ==
Brazil, Argentina and Uruguay.
