= Marisa planogyra =

Scientific classification
- Kingdom: Animalia
- Phylum: Mollusca
- Class: Gastropoda
- Subclass: Caenogastropoda
- Order: Architaenioglossa
- Superfamily: Ampullarioidea
- Family: Ampullariidae
- Genus: Marisa
- Species: M. planogyra

Binomial name
- Marisa planogyra Pilsbry, 1933

Species of snail

Marisa planogyra is a species of freshwater snail in the family Ampullariidae.

== Distribution ==
M. planogyra has been found in Brazil, Colombia, Argentina, Venezuela, and Trinidad and Tobago.
