= Felipponea elongata =

Scientific classification
- Kingdom: Animalia
- Phylum: Mollusca
- Class: Gastropoda
- Subclass: Caenogastropoda
- Order: Architaenioglossa
- Family: Ampullariidae
- Genus: Felipponea
- Species: F. elongata

Binomial name
- Felipponea elongata (Dall, 1921)

Species of gastropod

Felipponea elongata is a species of large freshwater snail with an operculum, an aquatic gastropod mollusk in the family Ampullariidae, the apple snail family.

== The original description ==
Felipponea elongata was originally discovered and described (under the name Ampullaria (Felipponea) elongata) by W. H. Dall in 1921.

Dall's original text (the type description) reads as follows:

AMPULLARIA (FELIPPONEA) ELONGATA n. sp.

Shell solid, conic, of three and a half flattish whorls separated by a distinct, almost channelled suture (the apex deeply eroded); shell substance grayish to slate color, with irregular broad spiral purple lines, the whole covered with an olivaceous, thick, polished, dehiscent periostracum of a brittle character; base rounded, umbilicus only a narrow chink behind the thin raised inner lip; aperture pear-shaped, smooth inside, showing the color bands; margin sharp-edged, not continuous across the body. Height of decollate shell 29; of last whorl 25; of aperture 17; of maximum diameter 19 mm. U. S. Nat. Mus. No. 333024.

Habitat. Uruguay River, Dept. of Paysandú; Dr. F. Felippone.

It is interesting to get another and quite distinct species of this subgenus which seems characteristic of Uruguay River fauna. The present species differs most obviously from the type, F. neritiniformis, in the flat-sided spire and absence of an

umbilicus.

== Distribution ==
This species occurs in the Uruguay River in Uruguay.
