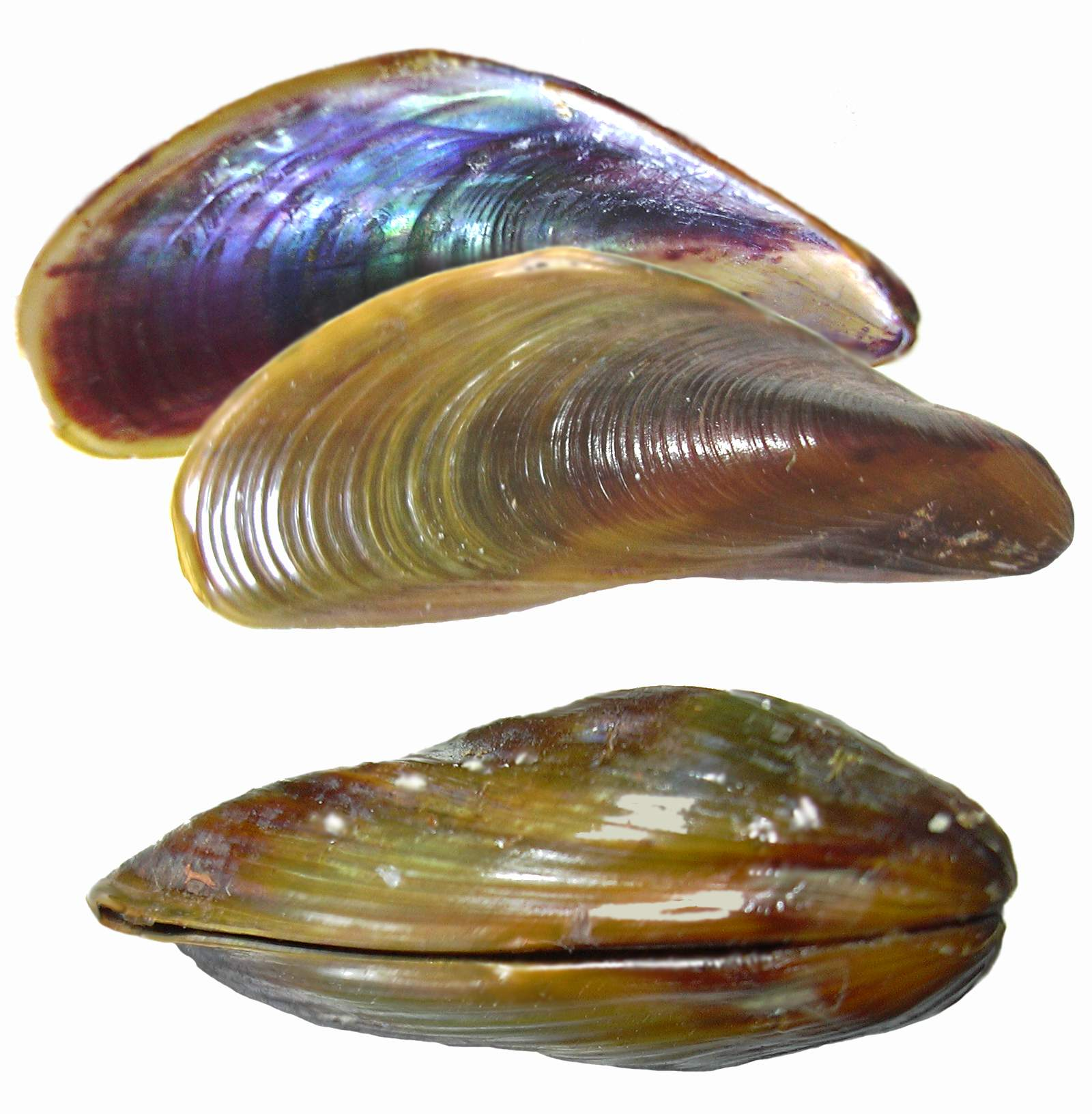

Conservation status
- Least Concern (IUCN 3.1)

Scientific classification
- Kingdom: Animalia
- Phylum: Mollusca
- Class: Bivalvia
- Order: Mytilida
- Family: Modiolidae
- Genus: Limnoperna
- Species: L. fortunei

Binomial name
- Limnoperna fortunei (Dunker, 1857)

Synonyms
- Dreissena siamensis Morelet, 1866; Limnoperna depressa Brandt & Temcharoen, 1971; Limnoperna lacustris; Limnoperna lemeslei Rochebrune, 1882; Limnoperna siamensis; Limnoperna supoti Brandt, 1974; Modiola cambodjensis Clessin, 1889; Modiola lacustris Martens, 1875; Mytilus martensi Neumayer, 1898; Volsella fortunei Dunker, 1857

= Limnoperna fortunei =

Golden mussel, medium sized, biofouler

Limnoperna fortunei, the golden mussel, is a medium-sized freshwater bivalve mollusc of the family Mytilidae. The native range of the species is China, but it has been introduced accidentally to several East Asian countries and South America, as well as the U.S. state of California, where it has become an invasive species. It is considered to be an ecosystem engineer because it alters the nature of the water and the bottom habitats of lakes and rivers and modifies the associated invertebrate communities. It also has strong effects on the properties of the water column, modifying nutrient proportions and concentrations, increasing water transparency, decreasing phytoplankton and zooplankton densities, on which it feeds, and enhancing the growth of aquatic macrophytes. Because mussels attach to hard substrata, including the components of industrial, water-treatment and power plants, they have become a major biofouling problem in the areas invaded.

== Description ==
The larvae of the golden mussel are small (around 100 micrometres (1/250 in)), and live in the water column until they are ready to settle. The size of adult individuals is usually around 20–30 millimetres (3/4–1 1/4 in) in length, but specimens up to over 45 millimetres (1 3/4 in) have been reported. The outer surface of the shell is golden to dark brown, whereas internally it is nacreous, pearly white to purple. The valves are very thin and brittle, and there are no hinge teeth. The mantle is fused on the dorsal side and between the exhalant siphon and the inhalant aperture. Water enters the mussel's mantle cavity through the inhalant aperture, and after describing a series of movements during which suspended particles are filtered out and either ingested, digested in the gut, and the undigested remains egested as feces, or discarded as pseudofeces, is expelled through the exhalant siphon. These water currents are also used for respiration and for discarding excretion waste products. The shell attaches to hard substrates by byssal threads, forming beds of closely packed animals. Internally, a series of muscles attached to the valves are responsible for its closure, retraction of the byssus, and movements of the foot.

== Reproduction, growth and life cycle ==
Limnoperna fortunei is dioecious, with approximately equal numbers of males and females and very small proportions of hermaphrodites. Sexual maturation occurs early, at about 5–6 millimetres (13/64–15/64 in). Ova and sperm are liberated into the water, most probably simultaneously within the same area, where fertilization occurs producing a series of planktonic developing forms including a trochophore and a veliger around 150 micrometres (0 in) in size. The final larval stage before settling on a substrate, which takes between 20 days (at 20 °C (68 °F)) and 12 days (at 28 °C (82 °F)) is the plantigrade larva (~250 micrometres (1/64 in)). The reproductive cycle has been described for both Asian and South American populations, and is clearly associated with water temperature. In South America, at water temperatures between ~10 and 30 °C (50 and 86 °F), larvae are produced continuously for 6–10 months of the year between spring and autumn, often with conspicuous peaks around November and April. In Japan, at water temperatures around 5–20 °C (41–68 °F), larval production is restricted to 1–2 summer months. Larval densities during the reproductive period are very variable, but normally average around 6000 larvae per cubic meter of water, although values in excess of 20000 larvae per cubic meter of water have been reported. In waterbodies where strong cyanobacterial blooms occur, reproduction can be suppressed altogether because cyanobacterial toxins (microcystin) engender massive larval mortalities.

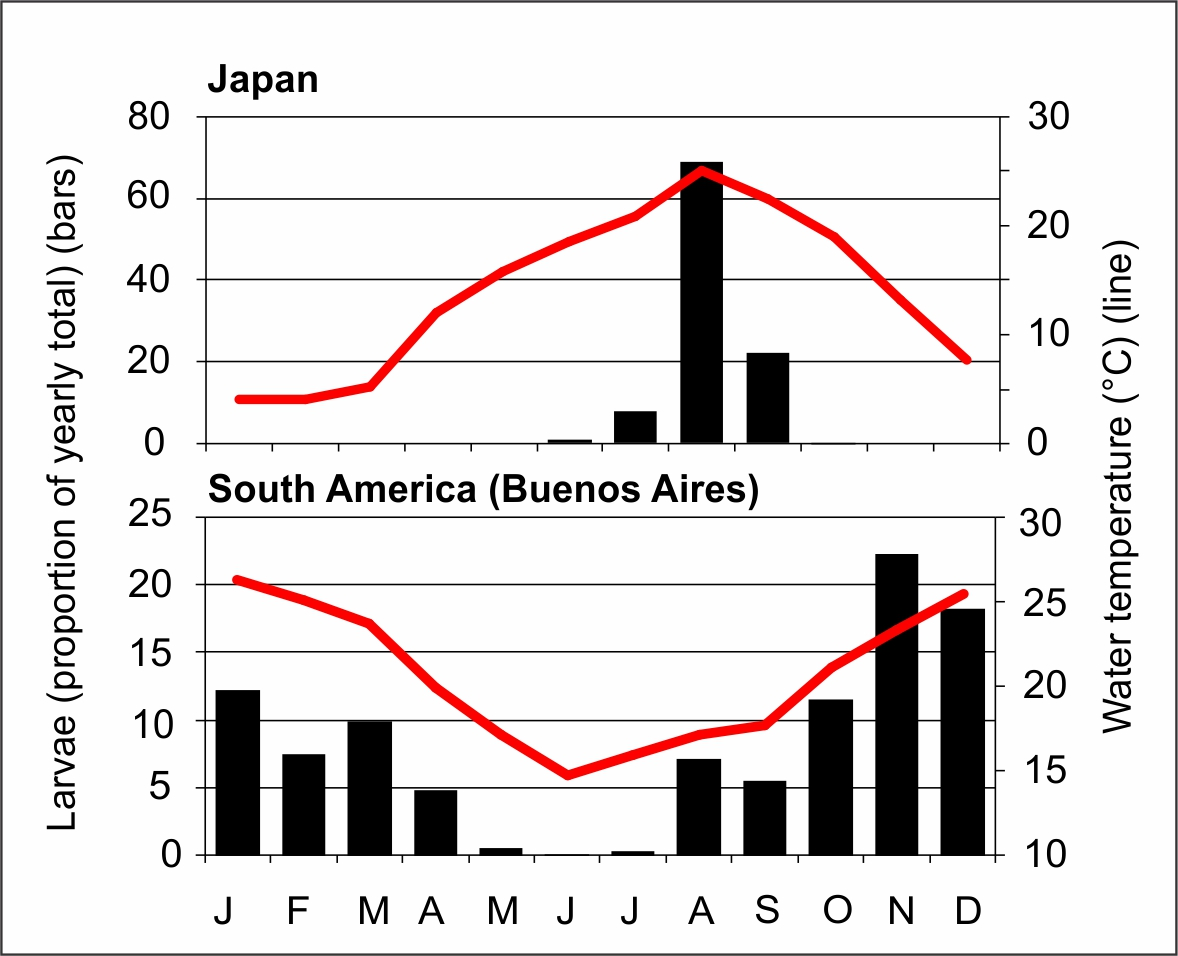
Typical yearly cycles of larval production in Japan and in South America, and mean monthly water temperature

The golden mussel's life span is around 2 years. Growth is fastest during the summer, decreasing sharply in winter. During the first year mussels typically grow to ~20 millimetres (25/32 in), reaching ~25–30 millimetres (63/64–1 3/16 in) at the end of the second year. Growth rates and final size depend largely on water temperature and the time of the year when the individuals are born, although calcium concentrations, pollution, food availability and intraspecific competition may play important roles as well.

L. fortunei is among several biofouling pests that should be high quarantine priorities around the world.

== Distribution and geographic spread ==
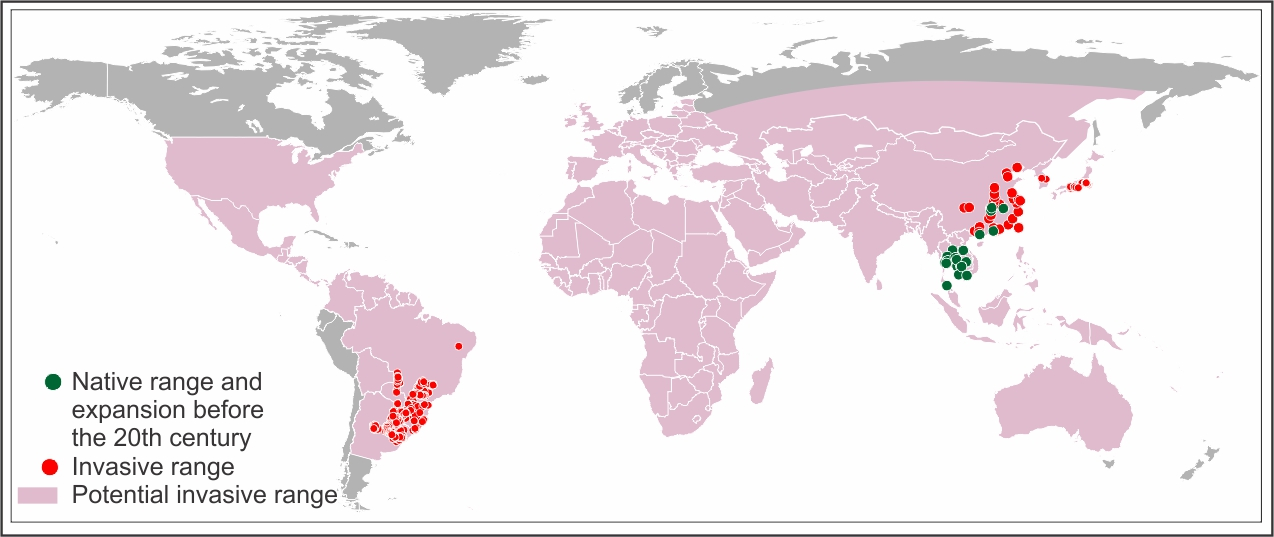
Current (2017) and potential worldwide distribution of Limnoperna fortunei

L. fortunei's native range is most probably the Pearl River basin, in southern China, with longstanding populations in China, Thailand, Korea, Laos, Cambodia, Vietnam, and Indonesia. Its presence in Laos, Cambodia, Thailand and Vietnam is probably the result of historical human migrations. L. fortunei arrived in Hong Kong as veligers from a tributary of the Pearl River, in the late 1960s. After two or three years it had colonised the water supply equipment and some natural bodies around HK, and in the decades since has increased in density and recolonised the water supply annually. Between 1965 and 1990, it spread into Korea (although it may be native there), Taiwan and Japan.

Shortly thereafter, the species turned up in South America. Around 1990 it appeared in Argentina. By 2006 it had spread to Uruguay, Paraguay, Bolivia, and Brazil. In 2017, in South America it was present in two major basins (Río de La Plata, including the Paraguay-Paraná and Uruguay rivers, and the São Francisco basin), as well as several smaller watersheds (Mar Chiquita, Guaíba, Patos-Mirim, Tramandaí). Its spread northwards in South America (Amazon, Orinoco, Magdalena basins), as well as into Central and southern North America, seems very likely.

The first known occurrence of this species in North America, in the Sacramento–San Joaquin River Delta of the Port of Stockton in California, was announced by the California Department of Parks and Recreation in October of 2024.

== Ecology and environmental impacts ==
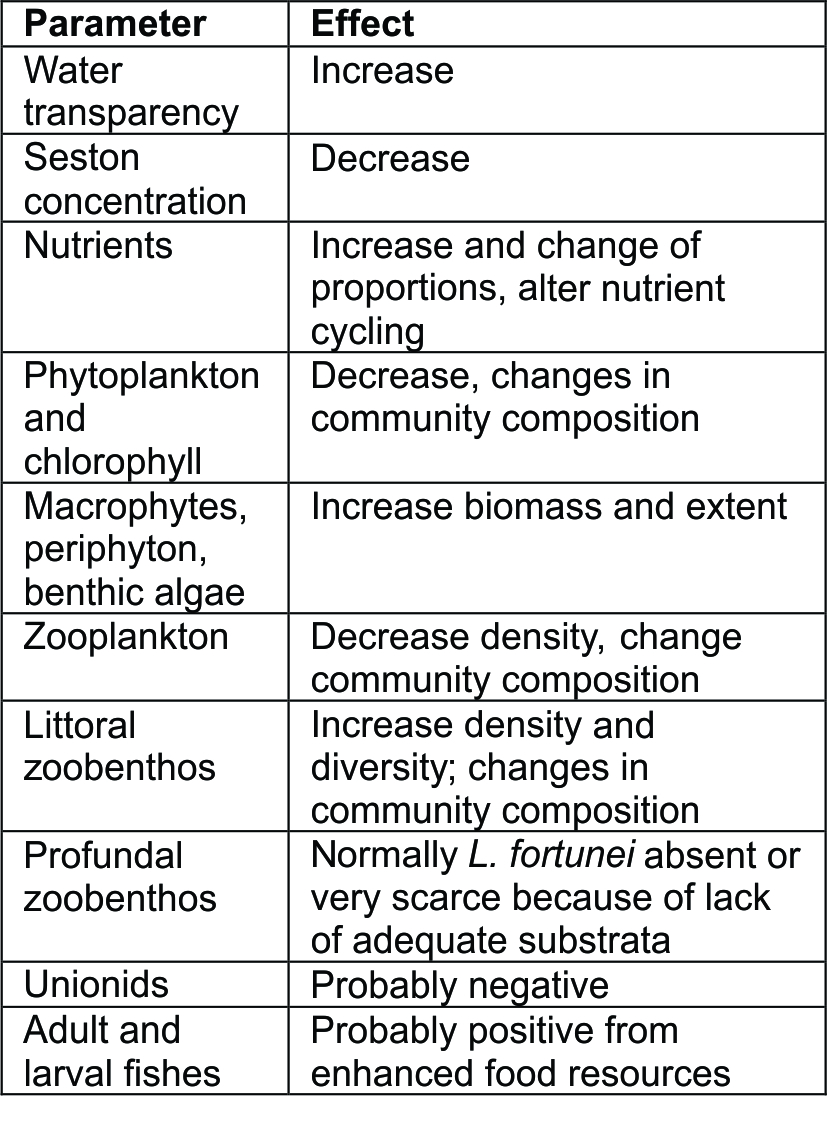
Summary of known and potential effects of Limnoperna fortunei on the freshwater biota

L. fortunei is a strictly freshwater species, although it can tolerate brackish waters of up to 23 per mil (23 grams of salt per liter of water) for restricted periods of time (hours).

The mussel needs hard substrata for settling, like rocks, wood, floating and submerged plants, mussel shells, crustaceans, etc. Although it cannot live on fine loose sediments, muddy areas stabilized by roots or fibrous debris are also occasionally colonized. Because in most waterbodies colonies are intensively preyed upon (mostly by fishes), colonization is often restricted to crevices inaccessible to large predators.

Mussel beds cover extensive areas at densities often in excess of 200,000 per square metre (810,000,000/acre) (including early juveniles below 1 millimetre (3/64 in) in size), but their thickness rarely exceeds 7–10 centimetres (3–4 in), with most adults being at least partially attached to the substrate. Settlement of new recruits is higher in established mussel beds than elsewhere, and juveniles often attach to larger shells, but eventually move deeper towards the substrate. The very few surveys on population densities over large areas reported around 1000 mussels per square meter. In lakes, reservoirs and rivers, mussel colonization is often restricted to coastal areas, where hard substrata are more abundant because loose sediments are winnowed away from these higher energy zones towards deeper areas.

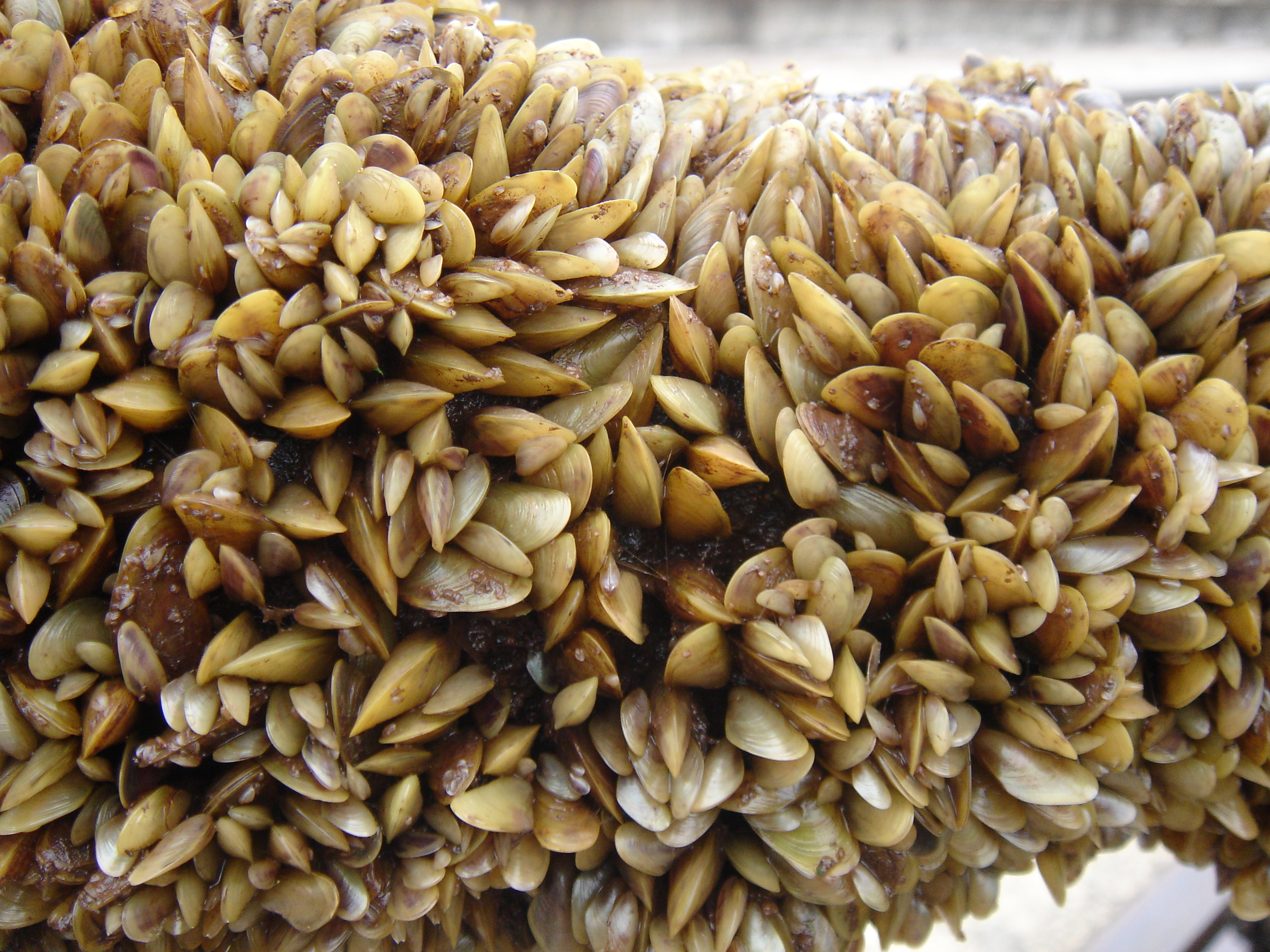
Limnoperna fortunei colony on a tree trunk recovered from the bottom of Salto Grande reservoir (Uruguay River, Argentina-Uruguay)

The golden mussel is a filter-feeder. Adult individuals process around 1 liter of water every 10 hours, retaining organic particles, including phytoplankton and zooplankton, and egesting or rejecting unwanted materials in mucous strands that settle on the bottom. The effects of this process on the water column include the decrease of suspended particles, water column primary production, and the concomitant increase in water transparency. which in turn enhances the growth of submerged macrophytes. Further, nutrient (ammonia, nitrate, phosphate) concentrations in the water are increased, favoring the growth of often toxic cyanobacteria. Bottom deposits and the sediments retained among the mussels are enriched with organic matter. Benthic organisms and those that feed on detritus in general, including many fish species, benefit from this additional source of energy. Benthic invertebrates, in particular, are usually more diverse and abundant in mussel beds than elsewhere.

In South America, adult L. fortunei is preyed upon by at least 50 fish species. Introduction of this mussel in South America has been tentatively associated with large increases in the landings of the commercially most important detritivorous fish species of the Río de la Plata basin, Prochilodus lineatus. In Argentina and in Japan, up to over 90% of the mussel's production is lost to predation, mostly presumably by fishes, but also probably by other invertebrates, waterfowl, turtles, and mammals. In South America, the planktonic larvae of the golden mussel are actively consumed by fish larvae of ~20 species, especially from the orders Characiformes and Siluriformes. This diet has been shown to significantly improve fish growth, especially during the earliest developmental stages.

The evidence of whether these impacts are positive or negative for the ecosystems invaded is mixed and debatable. This issue is further complicated by the fact that the same forcing can have opposite results. For example, while the provision of organic matter from the mussel's feces and pseudofeces and the protection conveyed by its colonies can enhance the abundance and diversity of benthic invertebrates, this extra load of organic matter can also deplete near-bottom oxygen levels, thus decreasing the abundance and diversity of benthic invertebrates.

== Impacts on human activities ==
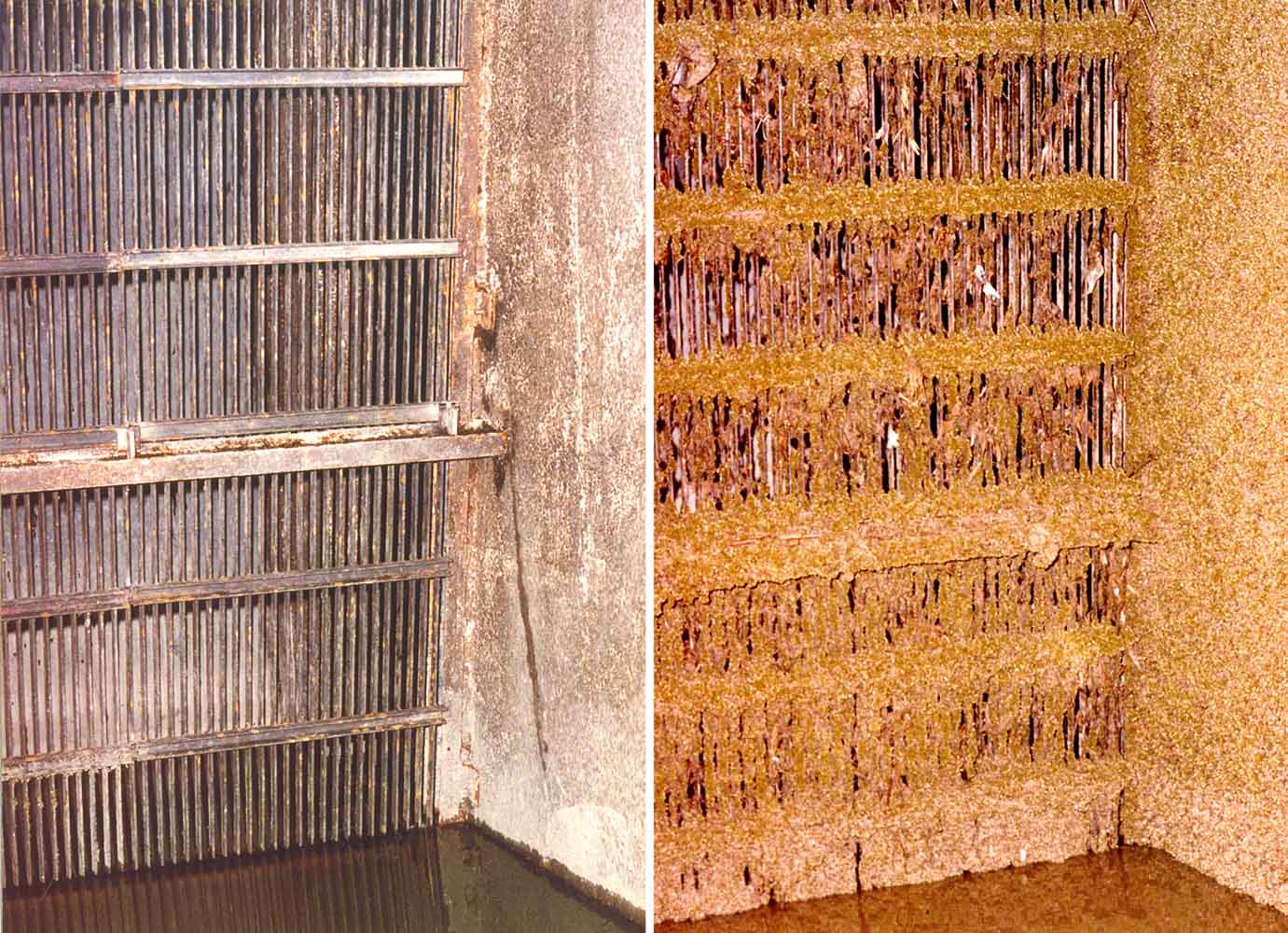
Grate at the raw water intake of a power plant clean (left), and fouled by Limnoperna fortunei (righ

L. fortunei had widespread consequences for man-made structures. The mussel has caused severe fouling problems in both Asia and in South America, affecting facilities including power plants, water processing plants, refineries, steel mills, aqueducts, and agricultural irrigation systems. Many different machine components exposed to flowing or still water can be fouled by the mussel, including pipes, filters, pumps, seals, and storage tanks. Watercraft and boat engines can be fouled by the mussels.

Problems caused by fouling include:

- clogging by living or dead mussels or dislodged shells
- pressure loss
- overheating
- corrosion
- abrasion, deterioration, and wear of metal, concrete, or other materials
- jamming of moving components
- sealing failures
- sediment accumulation

However, objective estimates of the economic losses involved are practically unavailable. Fouling by L. fortunei has not caused a single definitive plant shutdown, though operation at below-standard regimes and even temporary shutoffs have been reported. Numerous fouling control methods have been proposed and tested, either in laboratory conditions or in actual operating environments. These include antifouling materials and coatings, manual/mechanical cleaning, filtration, chemical treatments, thermal shock, anoxia and hypoxia, desiccation, ozonation, ultraviolet treatment, electric currents, ultrasound, manipulations of flow speed, biological control, and various miscellaneous methods..

== Subspecies ==
Limnoperna fortunei kikuchii turns out to not be an L. f. at all: The Australian mussel Xenostrobus securis was initially misidentified and given this name in Japan in the 1970s. The wide morphological range of Limnopernae contributed to this confusion.
