= Gruta das Areias =

Sāo Paulo caverns

Coordinates: 24.589376°S 48.701858°W

Gruta das Areias is a complex of caverns located in the region of Lajeado, in the municipality of Iporanga, São Paulo, Brazil. It is therefore part of the Areias System, located in the southwestern part of the carbonatic area Lajeado-Bombas, on the right bank of the Betari river, in the municipality of Iporanga, southeast of the state. It comprises the caves Ressurgência das Areias (SP-016), the 5.565 meter-long cave Areias de Cima (SP-018) and the Areias de Baixo (SP-019) cave, also popularly called Areias I and II. It is also part of the so-called Açungui group of caverns formed between the Mesoproterozoic and Neoproterozoic, between 1.6 billion and 539 million years ago.

== Survey ==
Discovered in 1906 by the German naturalist Richard Krone, who visited both caves called at that time Areias do Pedroso I and Areias do Pedroso II, the cave is very important in the field of biology because of the existence of the world-famous Pimelodella kronei, the Blind-Catfish, a troglobitic fish species unique to the waters of some caves in the region.

This species of fish was later found in some creeks in the region of Bombas, and invariably shaped the idea of a subterrain river connecting both caves with Ressurgencia das Areias das Aguas Quentes. A topographic survey led by Michel Le Bret took place in 1960, and again in 1968, conducted by the Sociedade Excursionista e Espeleológica de Ouro Preto. On both occasions this connection between the caves Areias de Baixo and Ressurgencia das Areias das Aguas Quentes suggested by Richard Krone in 1909 could not be established. In 1974 a new attempt took place, but failed. The connection was only possible in 1975 when Pierre Martin used fluorescein dye in the stream found inside the cave Areias de Baixo.

== See also ==
- List of caves in Brazil
