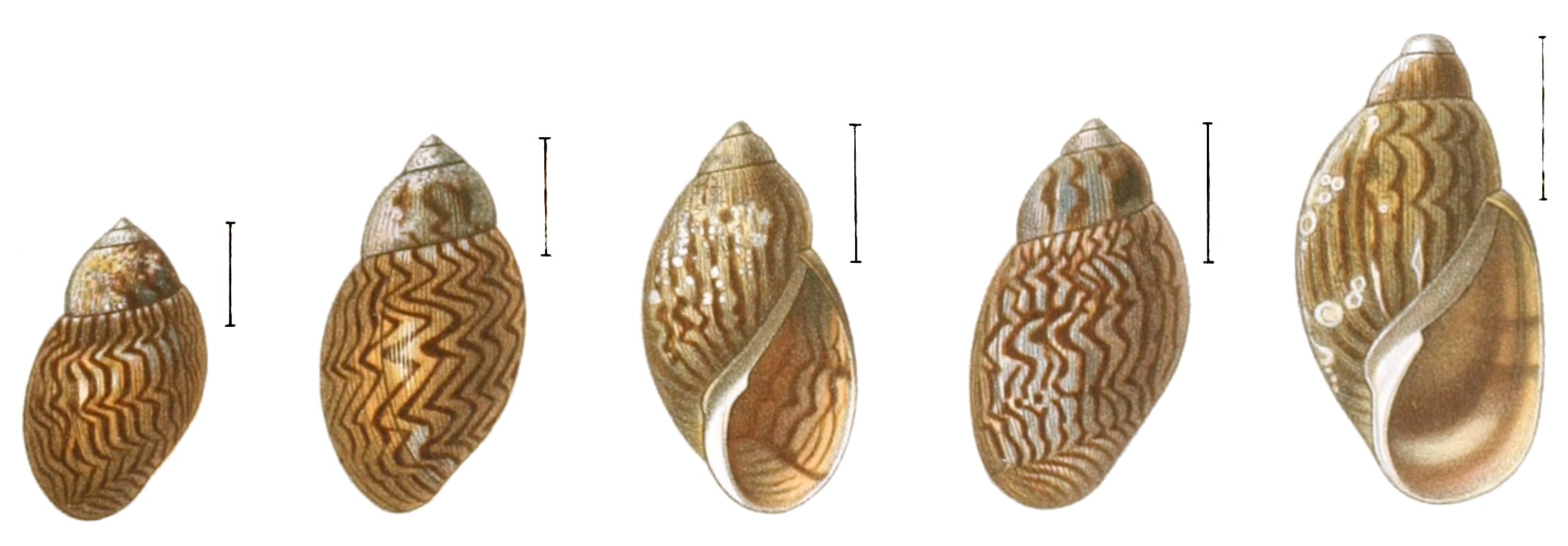
- Shells of Chilina fulgurata

Scientific classification
- Kingdom: Animalia
- Phylum: Mollusca
- Class: Gastropoda
- Superorder: Hygrophila
- Genus: Chilina
- Species: C. fulgurata

Binomial name
- Chilina fulgurata Pilsbry, 1911

= Chilina fulgurata =

Species of gastropod

Chilina fulgurata is a species of air-breathing freshwater snail, an aquatic pulmonate gastropod mollusk in the family Chilinidae.
