= Anisancylus obliquus =

Scientific classification
- Kingdom: Animalia
- Phylum: Mollusca
- Class: Gastropoda
- Superorder: Hygrophila
- Family: Planorbidae
- Genus: Anisancylus
- Species: A. obliquus

Binomial name
- Anisancylus obliquus (Broderip & Sowerby I, 1832)

Species of gastropod

Anisancylus obliquus is a species of small, freshwater, air-breathing limpet, an aquatic pulmonate gastropod mollusc in the family Planorbidae, the ram's horn snails and their allies.

== Distribution ==
A. obliquus is native to Brazil, where it occurs in the southern part of the country, Chile, Uruguay and Argentina. Its occurrence in Peru, in the city of Callao, needs to be confirmed.

== Description ==
A. obliquus has a high shell, reaching 7 millimetres (0.28 in) in length. The apex is prominent but not sharp, dorsally flattened, curved to the back and slightly to the right, with the tip usually facing down. The protoconch shows a deep apical depression, from which clear radial lines depart, and rounded, irregularly arranged punctuations. The teleoconch shows prominent radial lines, more salient in the anterior-medial region of the shell.

The mantle is strongly pigmented and can be totally black; pigmentation is also present in the areas of muscle insertion (foot and tentacles). The anterior right muscle impression is elongated, extending to the middle region of the body. The left impression is elliptical and transversely arranged while the posterior impression is rounded.

The rachidian tooth has two long main cusps and might have a denticle between them, with one to two cusps to the side of the left main cusp and one to the side of the right one. The lateral teeth are tricuspid, with the mesocone largest and two to five minor cusps to the side of the endocone and the ectocone. The marginal teeth have up to ten cusps.

The ovotestis has 30 follicles on average. The prostate has 3 to 5 follicles.
