= Asolene platae =

Scientific classification
- Kingdom: Animalia
- Phylum: Mollusca
- Class: Gastropoda
- Subclass: Caenogastropoda
- Order: Architaenioglossa
- Family: Ampullariidae
- Genus: Asolene
- Species: A. platae

Binomial name
- Asolene platae (Maton, 1811)

Synonyms
- Ampullaria cyclostoma Spix, 1827 · unaccepted; Ampullaria elegans d'Orbigny, 1835 · unaccepted; Ampullaria naticoides d'Orbigny, 1835 · unaccepted; Ampullaria storeria Jay, 1839 · unaccepted; Helix platae Maton, 1811 · unaccepted (original combination)

Species of snail

Asolene platae is a species of freshwater snail in the family Ampullariidae, first described by William George Maton in 1811.

== Distribution ==
The species is native to the Río de la Plata basin. They are also found in the pet trade where they are often sold under the name zebra apple snails.

== Reproduction ==
Asolene platae is a gonochoric species which lays its eggs underwater in a gelatinous mass.
