= Potamolithus iheringi =

Scientific classification
- Kingdom: Animalia
- Phylum: Mollusca
- Class: Gastropoda
- Subclass: Caenogastropoda
- Order: Littorinimorpha
- Family: Tateidae
- Genus: Potamolithus
- Species: P. iheringi

Binomial name
- Potamolithus iheringi Pilsbry, 1896

Species of gastropod

Potamolithus iheringi is a species of gastropod belonging to the family Tateidae.

The species is found in South America.
