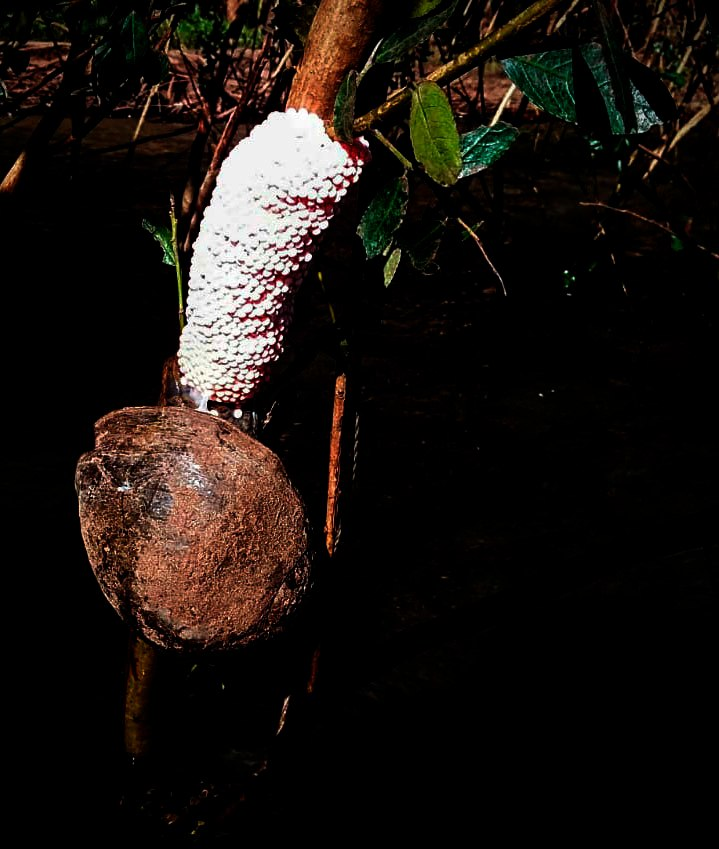

Scientific classification
- Kingdom: Animalia
- Phylum: Mollusca
- Class: Gastropoda
- Subclass: Caenogastropoda
- Order: Architaenioglossa
- Family: Ampullariidae
- Genus: Pomacea
- Species: P. megastoma

Binomial name
- Pomacea megastoma (Sowerby I, 1825)

Synonyms
- Ampullaria megastoma G. B. Sowerby I, 1825; Ampullaria neritoides d'Orbigny, 1835; Pomella (Pomella) megastoma (G. B. Sowerby I, 1825); Pomella megastoma (G. B. Sowerby I, 1825)

= Pomacea megastoma =

Species of gastropod

Pomacea megastoma is a species of gastropod belonging to the family Ampullariidae.

The species is found in South America. The species inhabits freshwater environments.
