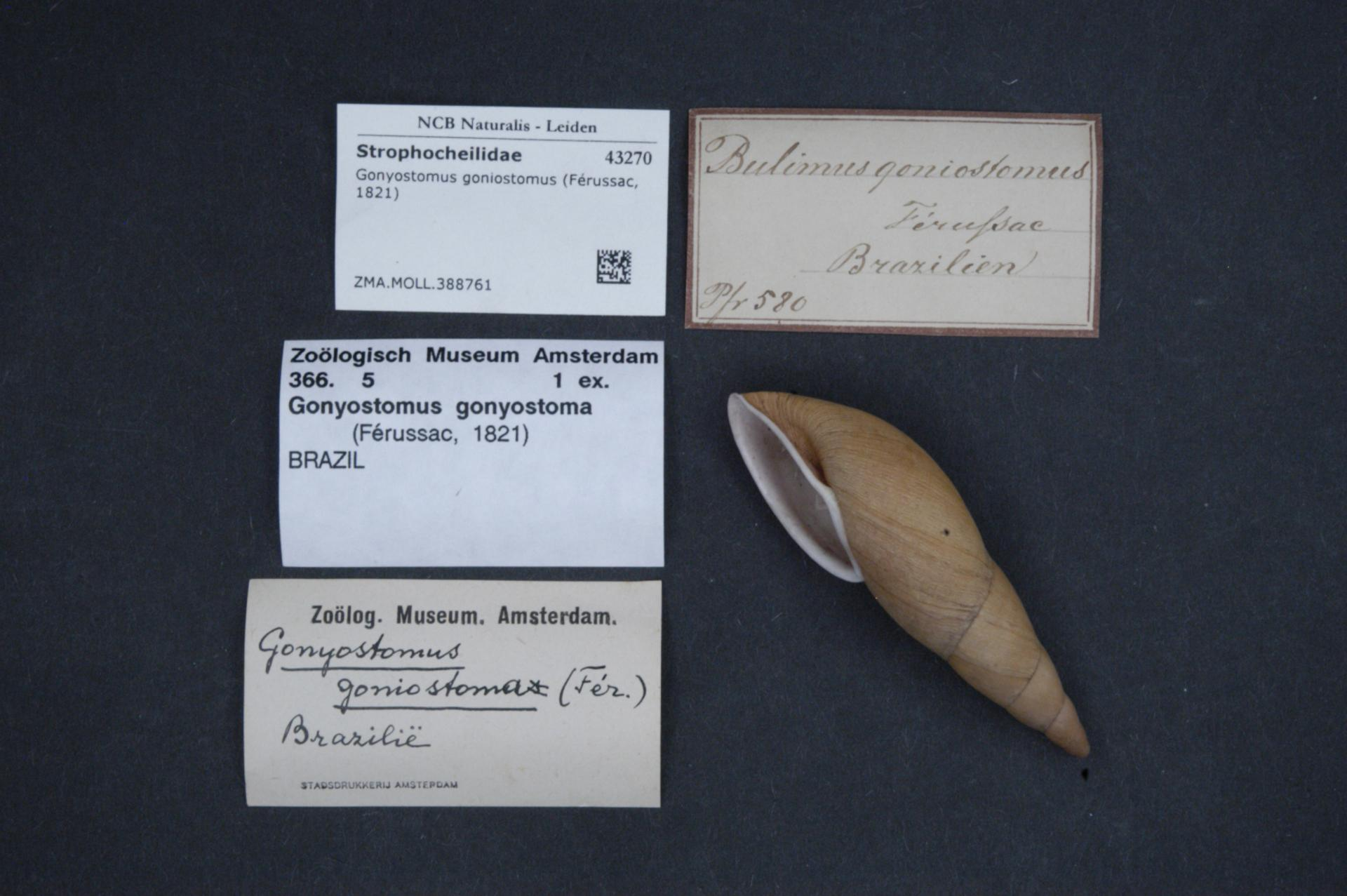
- Gonyostomus goniostomus

Scientific classification
- Kingdom: Animalia
- Phylum: Mollusca
- Class: Gastropoda
- Order: Stylommatophora
- Family: Odontostomidae
- Genus: Gonyostomus; Beck, 1837

= Gonyostomus =

Genus of gastropods

Gonyostomus is a genus of air-breathing land snails, terrestrial pulmonate gastropod mollusks in the family Odontostomidae, endemic to Brazil.

== Species ==
Species within the genus Gonyostomus include:

- Gonyostomus egregius (Pfeiffer, 1845)
- Gonyostomus elinae Simone, 2016
- Gonyostomus gonyostomus (Férussac, 1821)
- Gonyostomus insularis Leme, 1974

Synonyms

- Gonyostomus turnix (Férussac, 1821): synonym of Anthinus turnix (A. Gould, 1846) (superseded combination)
  - Gonyostomus turnix var. albolabiatus Jaeckel, 1927: synonym of Anthinus albolabiatus (Jaeckel, 1927) (basionym)
