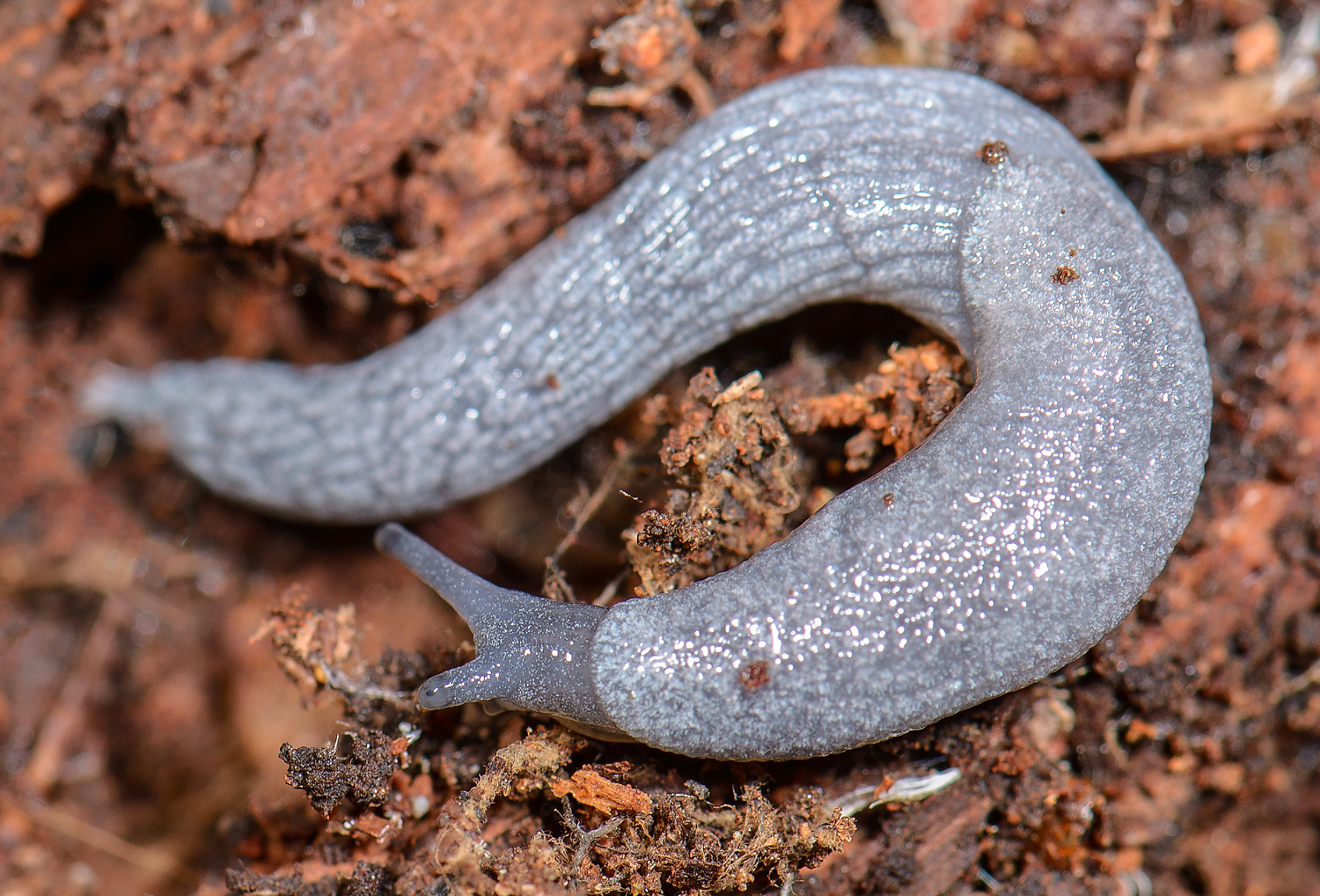

Conservation status
- Vulnerable (NatureServe)

Scientific classification
- Kingdom: Animalia
- Phylum: Mollusca
- Class: Gastropoda
- Order: Stylommatophora
- Family: Ariolimacidae
- Genus: Prophysaon
- Species: P. coeruleum

Binomial name
- Prophysaon coeruleum Cockerell, 1890

= Prophysaon coeruleum =

Species of slug

Prophysaon coeruleum, (the blue-grey taildropper), is a species of slug belonging to the genus Prophysaon, a genus known for the autotomy of its tail. It is native to western North America, from southwestern British Columbia to northwestern California, with a more isolated population in Idaho. There are conservation efforts in place to protect the blue-grey taildropper, and it is on multiple lists of species at risk.

== Description ==
Prophysaon coeruleum is a small, narrow slug which is notable for its typical blue-grey colour. It varies in length, adults ranging from 20 to 40 mm (0.8 to 1.6 in), with nearly one-third of that length being the mantle. Its tail, which can be self-amputated, has grooves along the length of it and a line at the point of amputation, although it does not have a dorsal keel. The blue-grey taildropper has a narrow margin surrounding its foot, which is typically light grey or white in colour, and it produces a clear mucus. The breathing pore, called a pneumostome, is found on the right front side of the body, on the mantle.

The blue-grey taildropper, despite its name, has been described in several colours, including blue, blue-gray, dark gray, brown and black, all observed with opalescent spots. The bluer individuals have typically been found in the middle to northern part of this species' range, whereas the darker individuals are typically observed in the south of its range. It has also been observed in light gray or white, the individuals of which are found throughout its range. The variation in colour is thought to be due to differences in the pigment melanin, although the reason for the variation in pigment between slugs is unknown. However, it may be due to differences in elevation: higher elevations expose the slugs to increased levels of UV-radiation, from which the blue-grey taildropper can be protected by having more melanin.

== Taxonomy and phylogeny ==
The blue-grey taildropper belongs to the class Gastropoda, the order Stylommatophora, and the family Ariolimacidae. It is a member of the genus Prophysaon, the species of which can be found in the Pacific Northwest, from California to southern Alaska, and are known for the autotomy of their tail. There are ten known species in the genus Prophysaon according to Molluscabase: Prophysaon andersonii (J.G. Cooper, 1872), Prophysaon boreale (Pilsbry, 1948), Prophysaon coeruleum (T. D. A. Cockerell, 1890), Prophysaon dubium (Cockerell, 1890), Prophysaon fasciatum (Cockerell, 1890) Prophysaon foliolatum (A. Gould, 1851), Prophysaon humile (Cockrell, 1890), Prophysaon obscurum (Cockerell, 1890), Prophysaon pardalis (Pilsbry, 1948), and Prophysaon vanattae (Pilsbry, 1948).

Species of Prophysaon slugs

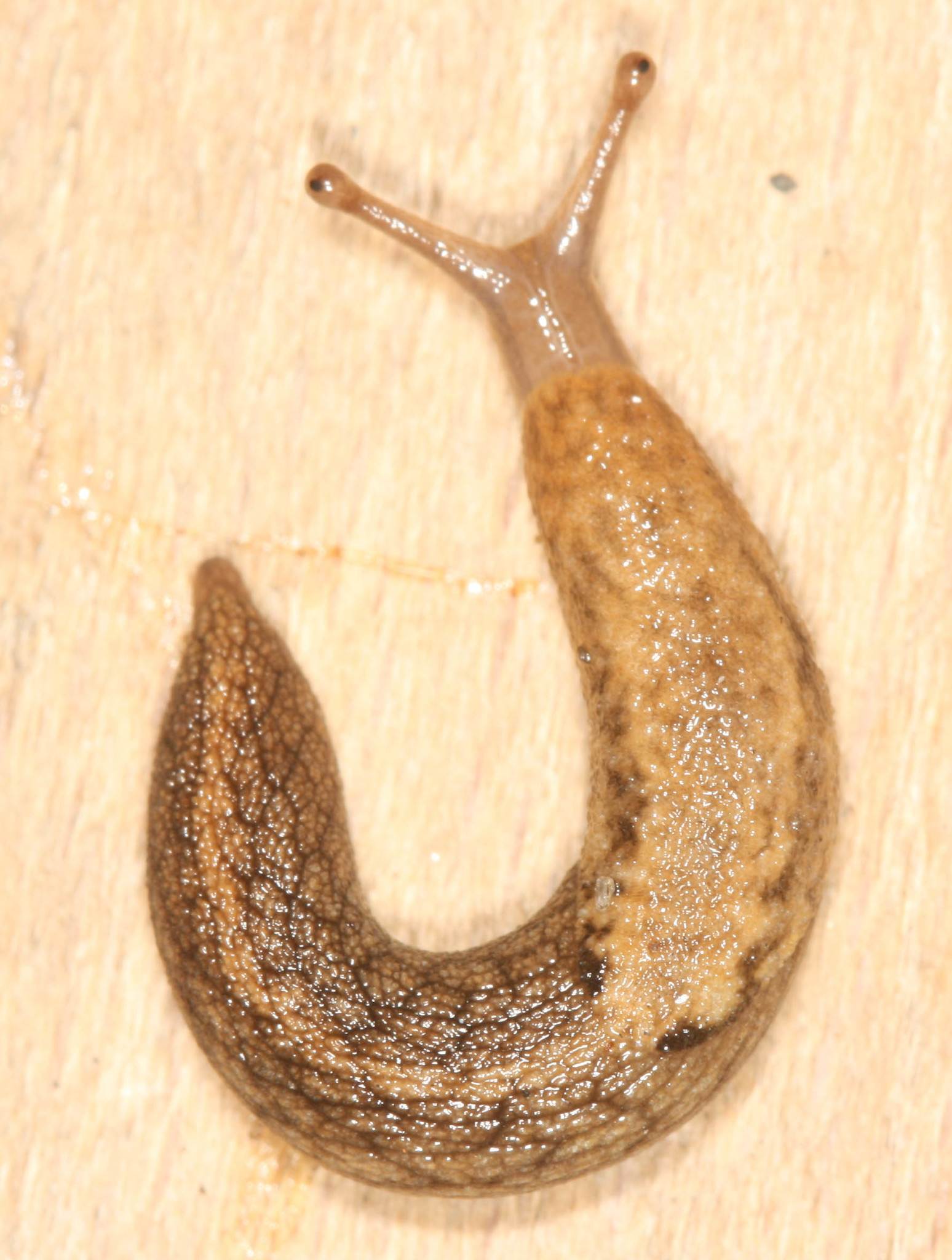
Prophysaon andersonii (Cockerell, 1872)

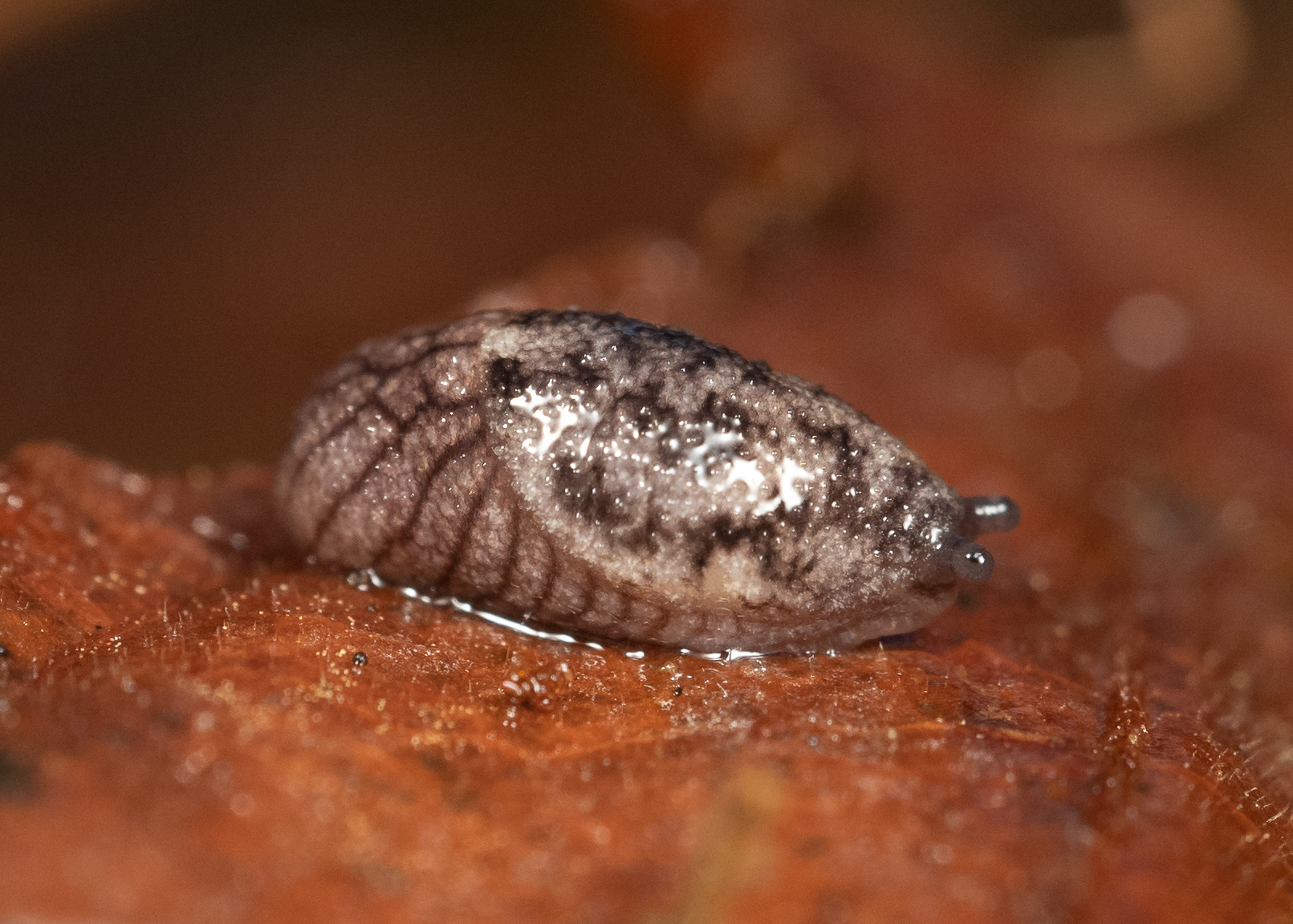
Prophysaon dubium (Cockerell, 1890)

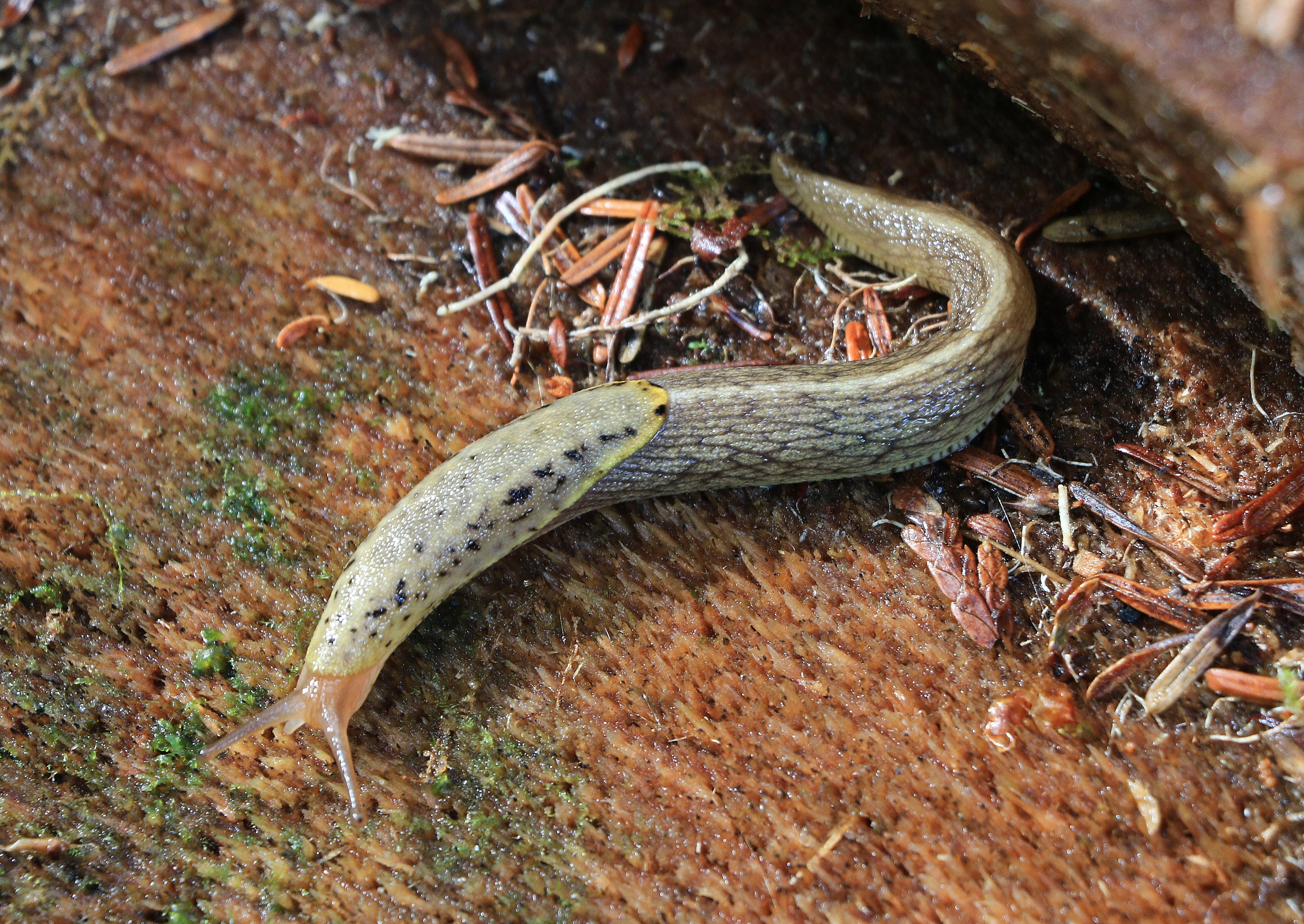
Prophysaon foliolatum (A. Gould, 1851)

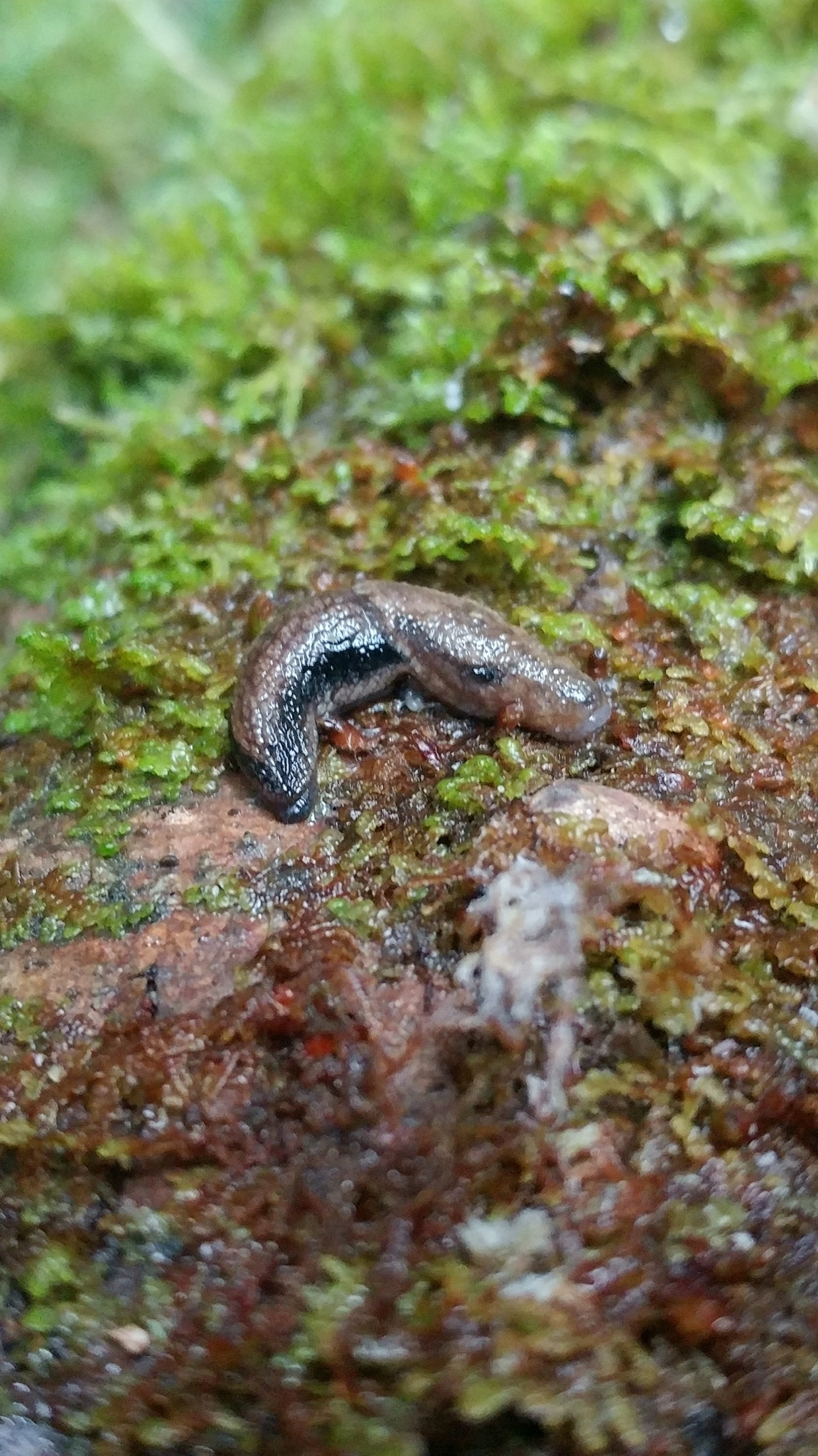
Prophysaon vanattae (Pilsbry, 1948)

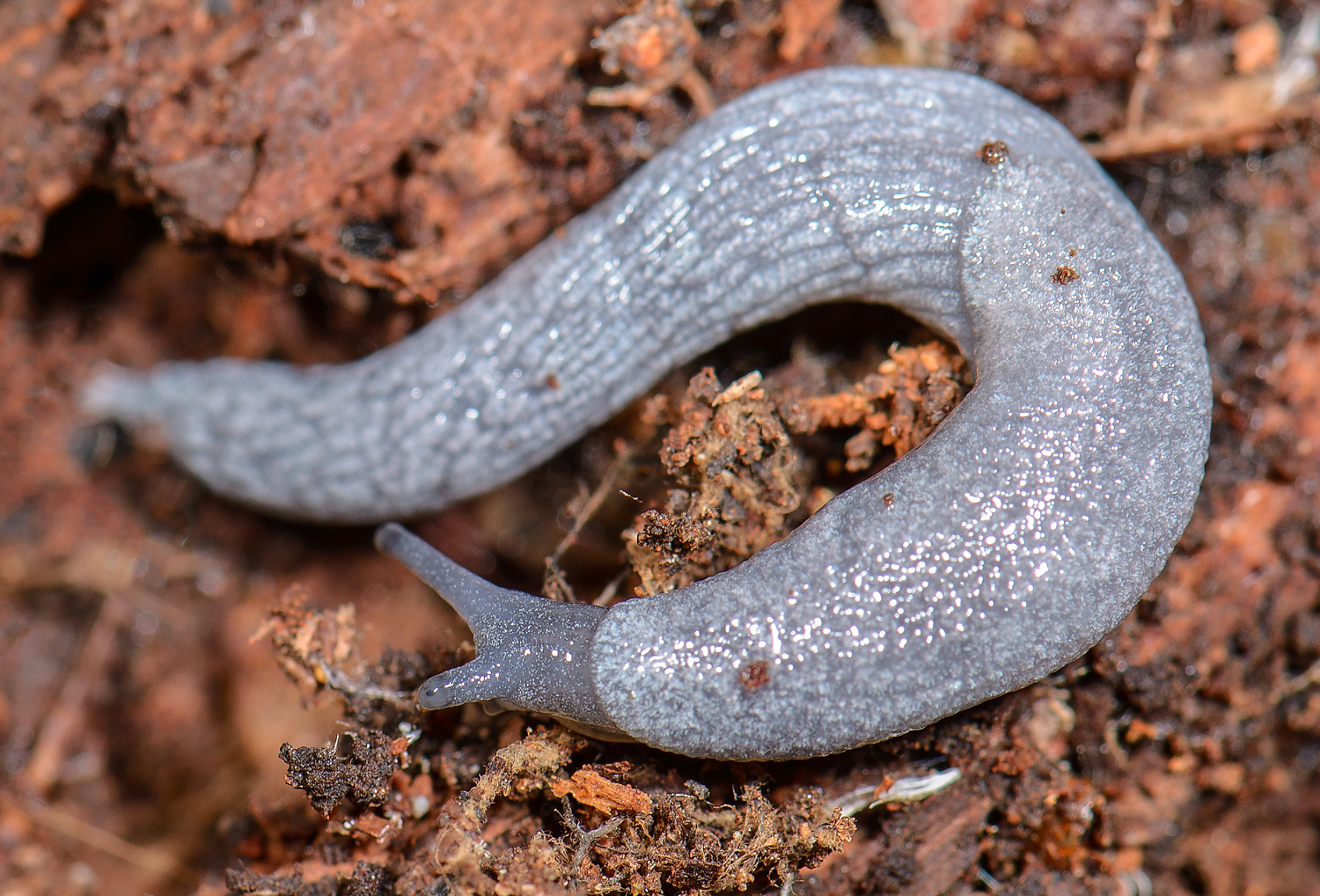
Prophysaon coeruleum (Cockerell, 1890)

== Distribution and dispersal ==
Prophysaon coeruleum can be found in western North America, from the southern tip of Vancouver Island, British Columbia, Canada, at its most northern point, down towards northern California, United States. It is thought to only be able to disperse tens to hundreds of meters every generation. Surveys suggest that the populations in its northern range are made up of several isolated populations, although the exact reasons for this isolation are not currently known.

=== History ===
There is genetic variation within this species, along with evidence to suggest that it is composed of three major groups, as well as eight subgroups. This genetic variation, mostly observed in its southern range (southern Oregon and northern California), likely occurred 2.6 to 5.9 million years ago, during the Pliocene or late Miocene. This variation may have been caused by geological events, which would have caused fragmentation and genetic drift within the species. There is also evidence showing that disturbances from less than 2 million years ago, during the Pleistocene, also led to some variation. There is also the possibility that this species may actually be a cryptic species complex, as opposed to one singular species.

=== Canada ===
Region of Vancouver Island where the blue-grey taildropper has been observed

The blue-grey taildropper was first observed in Canada in 2002, though, as of 2016 there are 15 known subpopulations of this species in British Columbia, Canada. Most subpopulations of Prophysaon coeruleum observed in British Columbia were found in the Capital Regional District, with two subpopulations being instead located in the North Cowichan District, slightly further north on Vancouver Island (see map). However, there may be more subpopulations which have not yet been observed. Prophysaon coeruleum has an extent of occurrence of 658 km^{2} (254.1 mi^{2}), however the fragmented nature of its distribution means that its index of area of occupancy is measured at 56 km^{2} (21.6 mi^{2}) as of December 2015. The northern portion of this species' range is fragmented, which may be due to human activity leading to the fragmentation of their habitat, as well as the slow dispersal of these slugs. This low dispersal ability mixed with their specific habitat needs (moist and cool forest floor litter), means that if this species is extirpated from an area, it may be difficult to recolonize. The population size of the blue-grey taildropper in Canada has been estimated at fewer than 10 000 individuals, although the accuracy of this estimate is unclear.

States where the blue-grey taildropper has been observed

=== United States ===
In the United States, the blue-grey taildropper can be found in western Oregon and Washington State, northern California, and northwestern Idaho (see map). More specifically, populations have been observed in the Coast Range, in the Cascade Range of Oregon and Washington, the Klamath mountains in southwestern Oregon and northern California, and the Puget Trough. The population observed in Idaho seems to be isolated from the rest, and also does not seem to be connected to the population in British Columbia.

== Habitat ==
The habitat of the blue-grey taildropper includes older forests or forests with similar features, which include thick forest floor litter or coarse woody debris, and are found in areas that are cool, moist, and shaded. These forests can include both coniferous and mixed-wood forests. The eggs of the slug also require moist habitats, as they are susceptible to desiccation if left without moisture.

The populations of Prophysaon coeruleum found in British Columbia has been observed in either the Coastal Douglas-fir biogeoclimatic zone, or the Coastal Western Hemlock biogeoclimatic zone. It was found in second-growth forests, with mixed-wood (coniferous and deciduous), and at elevations lower than 250 m (820 ft) above sea level. Observations from the United States, however, are more varied and include both coniferous and mixed-wood forests, and have been found at higher elevations (up to 1,650 m (5,410 ft) above sea level).

== Diet ==
The main components of the diet of Prophysaon coeruleum are fungal spores and hyphae. They come largely from mycorrhizal fungi, which are fungi that form symbiotic relationships with various vascular plants. The blue-grey taildropper has also been recorded as eating vascular plant tissues, lichens, and imperfect fungi.

== Behaviour ==
Much is unknown about the behaviour of Prophysaon coeruleum, as it is largely unstudied. Its ability to self-amputate its tail is a behaviour that is triggered in response to disturbances, and likely serves as a defense against predators such as beetles. During field surveys, this slug has been found both alone or with several individuals near each other, although it is unclear whether groupings occur due to the presence of preferred habitat or if is socially-motivated (eg. for mating).

== Reproduction ==
Much about the reproduction of the blue-grey taildropper is unknown. It is known to be oviparous, though its eggs and nests have only been observed in the United States. It most likely makes its nests in cool, moist environments, to keep its eggs from desiccating. Eggs from slugs of the genus Prophysaon are described as being white, opaque, and oval. The blue-grey taildropper seems to reproduce within the same year it hatches, and may only survive for one year, as adults are rarely found in early spring. This would mean that they either spend the winter as eggs and then hatch in the spring, or that adults will hibernate through the winter and then lay their eggs in the early spring. This slug is also simultaneously hermaphroditic, meaning that a single slug will have two sets of reproductive organs (male and female) at one time, although self-fertilization of eggs has not been observed, which suggests that they likely mate with other individuals.

== Ecology and interspecific interactions ==
Prophysaon coeruleum consumes both living and dead organic matter, such as plants and fungi, meaning they act as decomposers of organic matter. It is also a prey species, and although the exact species which act as their predators are largely unknown, it is likely that they share similar predators as other slugs in the area. These animals may include vertebrates such as various types of birds, amphibians, and small mammals, as well as invertebrates such as ground beetles and Lancetooth snails. There may be competition between the blue-grey taildropper and other invertebrates, including introduced and invasive gastropods, which may have a negative effect on Prophysaon coeruleum populations. Because a large part of its diet includes mycorrhizal fungi, this species may play a role in spreading the fungal spores of these fungi.

== Threats ==
There are several threats which may affect the blue-grey taildropper, although these vary according to the organisation in question. In the 2016 report published by the Committee on the Status of Endangered Wildlife in Canada (COSEWIC), it lists the threats to the Canadian population of Prophysaon coeruleum, as determined using the International Union for Conservation of Nature's (IUCN) threats calculator. They cite the three most severe threats to the blue-grey taildropper. First, there are the changes to this species' natural habitats: for example, the introduction of exotic species of plants can inhibit native plant growth and affect habitat quality. Next, introduced invertebrates affect not only the habitat, but may also directly compete with or predate on the blue-grey taildropper. Third, climate change can have effects on these slugs, as well as severe weather, which can have various effects such as habitat loss and direct mortality, as well as long-term modifications of habitat. For example, droughts affect the moist habitat that this species needs, and can also limit food resources. Other potential threats which may affect the success of the blue-grey taildropper include the development of commercial and residential buildings, as well as transportation and human recreational activities.

In 2012, the Government of British Columbia also evaluated the threats to the blue-grey taildropper, using the IUCN-CMP threats classification system (International Union for Conservation of Nature and Conservation Measures Partnership). The threats listed here differ slightly from those above: they cite the higher-impact threats as including "recreational activities", which includes camping, hiking, etc. and may affect habitat quality or can cause accidental mortality of blue-grey taildropper individuals. The second high-impact threat is "invasive non-native/alien species", including invasive gastropods which may compete with the blue-grey taildropper, invasive invertebrate predators, and invasive plants. Other threats listed as low to medium-impact include "housing and urban areas", "commercial and industrial area", "tourism and recreational areas", "roads and railroads", "logging and wood harvesting", and "fire and fire suppression".

The Washington Department of Fish and Wildlife's website lists the threats to this species as including climate change, which would lead to lower quality habitat (eg. loss of moist areas, higher temperatures) and changes in the fire regimes of their habitat, as well as modifications to their habitat caused by logging, "harvesting of understory vegetation", and "loss of coarse woody debris".

== Conservation ==
The blue-grey taildropper is included on several lists of species at risk, both at the national level and the regional levels, and is the subject of conservation plans in both Canada and the United States.

=== NatureServe ===
NatureServe evaluated the status of Prophysaon coeruleum at the global, national, provincial and state levels. In 2010, it was given a global rank of G3G4, meaning that it is between the statuses "Vulnerable" (G3) and "Apparently secure" (G4), although the rounded status is G3. This status is listed as needing a review.

In Canada, the blue-grey taildropper is only found in British Columbia, and the national and provincial NatureServe statuses are the same, at N2N3 nationally and S2S3 provincially, meaning they are between "Imperiled" (N2) and "Vulnerable" (N3). However, its national ranking in the United States falls on N3N4, falling between "Vulnerable" (N3) and "Apparently Secure" (N4). Additionally, there is a status for each state in which Prophysaon coeruleum can be found: "Unranked" in California, S1 ("Critically Imperiled") in Idaho, S3 ("Vulnerable") in Oregon, and S1 ("Critically Imperiled") in Washington state.

=== Canada ===
The blue-grey taildropper has a status of Threatened on Canada's Species at Risk Act (SARA) Schedule 1 as of 2019. Prior to this, from 2007 to 2019, they had a status of Endangered, but their status was changed in response to the change in evaluated status from Endangered to Threatened by the Committee on the Status of Endangered Wildlife in Canada (COSEWIC) in 2016.

COSEWIC determined the status of Prophysaon Coeruleum to be Threatened in 2016. Prior to that status, they had been listed as Endangered in 2006, but it was changed due to a re-evaluation. COSEWIC cites the reason for this status as being due to the species' limited distribution in Canada, as well as the fragmentation and degradation in the quality of its limited habitat. Of the various threats COSEWIC lists as potentially affecting the blue-grey taildropper, "natural system modifications", "invasive, non-native species", and "climate change and severe weather" are the three which have been estimated to have the most impact.

Environment and Climate Change Canada (ECCC) published a recovery plan for the blue-taildropper in 2018, which was adapted from the Government of British Columbia's recovery plan. The recovery plan, as published by the Government of British Columbia, contains three recovery objectives which include the protection of habitats where they have been observed, the mitigation of threats to this species, and the continuation of research on the blue-grey taildropper.

British Columbia's provincial list of conservation ranks by the Conservation Data Centre has classified the blue-grey taildopper as being on their Blue list, meaning they are of "Special Concern".

=== United States ===
The blue-grey taildropper is not listed on the U.S. Endangered Species Act.

In Washington, the blue-grey taildropper's state status is "Candidate", meaning that it may be considered for the status of "Endangered" of "Protected" in the future. The Washington Department of Fish and Wildlife's website lists the threats to the blue-grey taildropper (see above), as well as the conservation actions required to ensure their survival. These include the protection and monitoring of sites where they may be found, as well as more research into this species' habitat needs, range, and taxonomy. They also list this species' vulnerability to climate change as being "low-medium", although they state that there is not a lot of evidence supporting what its reaction to climate change would be. Prophysaon coeruleum is also listed as a "Species of Greatest Conservation Need" on Washington's "State Wildlife Action Plan". The blue-grey taildropper is also included on Washington's "Priority Habitat and Species Program" as a "Priority Species".

Idaho Fish and Game lists Prophysaon coeruleum's state conservation rank as being S1Q, meaning that they are "Critically Imperiled" (S1), but that there is some "uncertainty about taxonomic status" (Q). They are also listed as a "Species of Greatest Conservation Need Tier 1" in the Idaho State Wildlife Action Plan.
