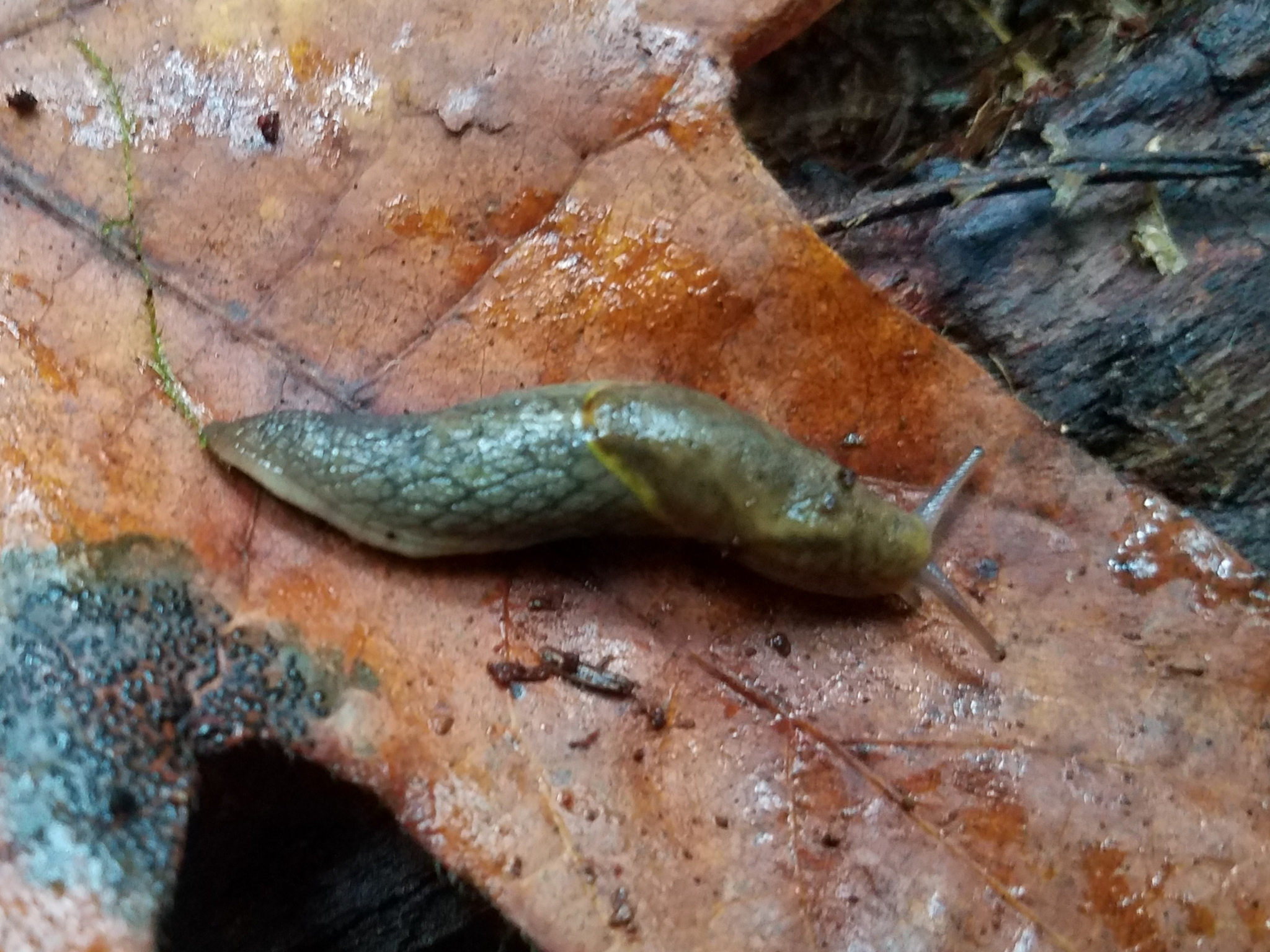

Conservation status
- Apparently Secure (NatureServe)

Scientific classification
- Kingdom: Animalia
- Phylum: Mollusca
- Class: Gastropoda
- Order: Stylommatophora
- Family: Ariolimacidae
- Genus: Prophysaon
- Species: P. foliolatum

Binomial name
- Prophysaon foliolatum (A. Gould, 1851)

Synonyms
- Arion foliolatus A.Gould, 1851

= Prophysaon foliolatum =

Species of gastropod

Prophysaon foliolatum, or the yellow-bordered taildropper, is a slug in the genus Prophysaon, native to North America, ranging from Alaska to Oregon.

== Appearance ==
This species is an overall dull brown colored slug, with a yellow line bordering its mantle. The similar species P. andersonii does not have this yellow border.

== Forms ==
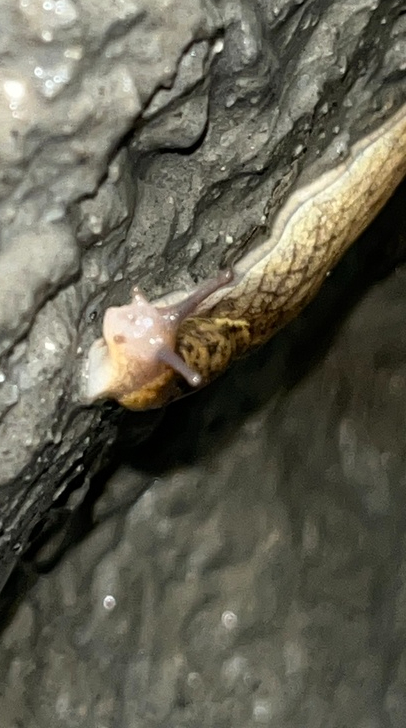
Prophysaon foliolatum climbing a wall, and displaying its yellow border at the secondary entrance of the Deadhorse Canyon trailhead.

There is a Canadian color form that is almost black, but it can still be distinguished by the bright yellow border the mantle.

Albino individuals have been spotted on the Olympic coast.
