= Etten =

Etten may refer to:

- Etten-Leur, a south Netherlands town in North Brabant province that includes former town Etten, a home of Van Gogh
- Etten, Netherlands, a village in Gelderland province, which was a municipality until 1818
- Nick Etten (1913-1990), an American baseball player

== See also ==
- Van Etten
