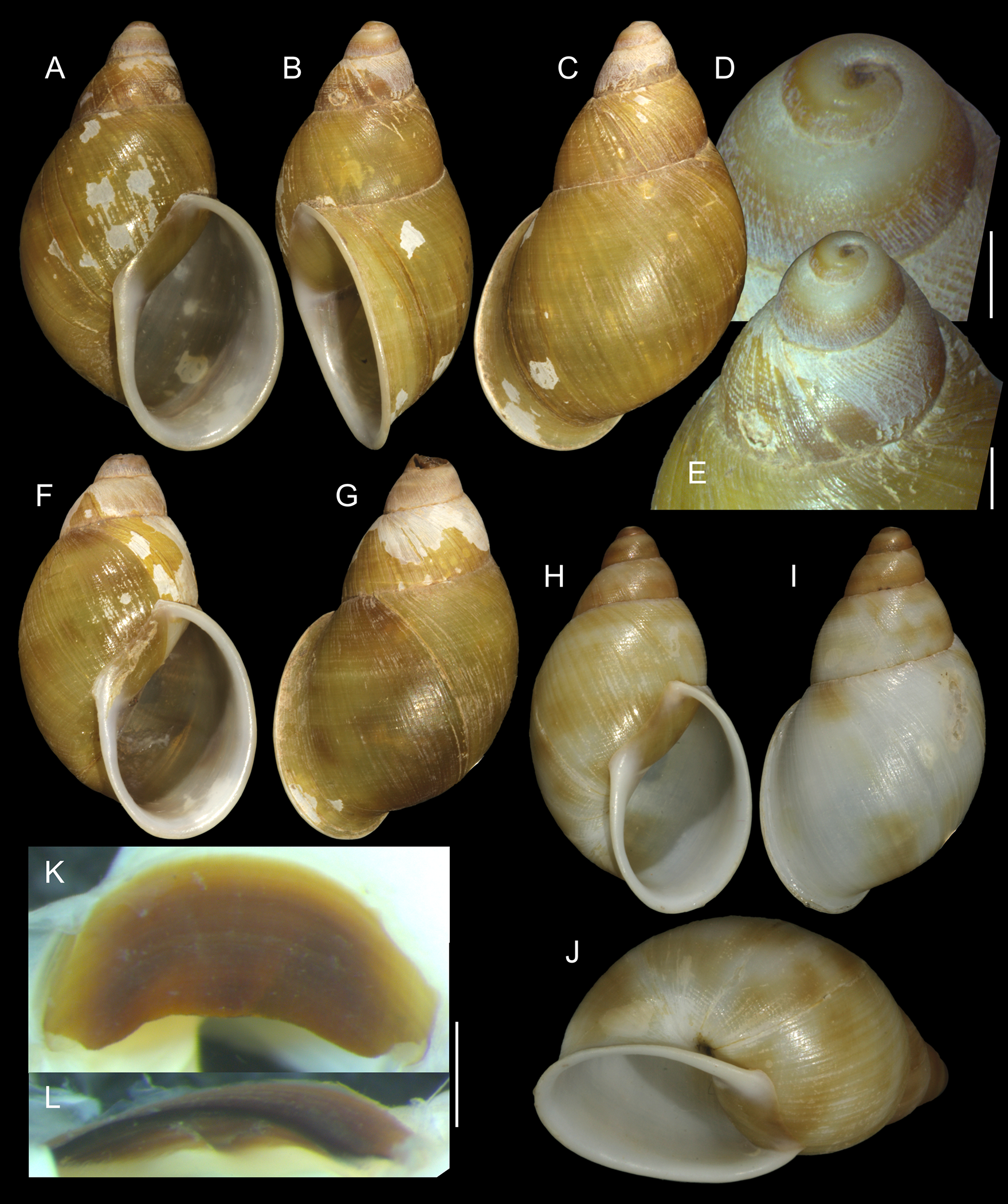
- Shell of Anthinus vailanti

Scientific classification
- Kingdom: Animalia
- Phylum: Mollusca
- Class: Gastropoda
- Order: Stylommatophora
- Family: Odontostomidae
- Genus: Anthinus
- Species: A. vailanti

Binomial name
- Anthinus vailanti Simone, 2022

= Anthinus vailanti =

Species of gastropod

Anthinus vailanti is a species of air-breathing land snails, terrestrial pulmonate gastropod mollusks in the family Odontostomidae.

== Distribution ==
This species occurs in Minas Gerais, Brazil.
