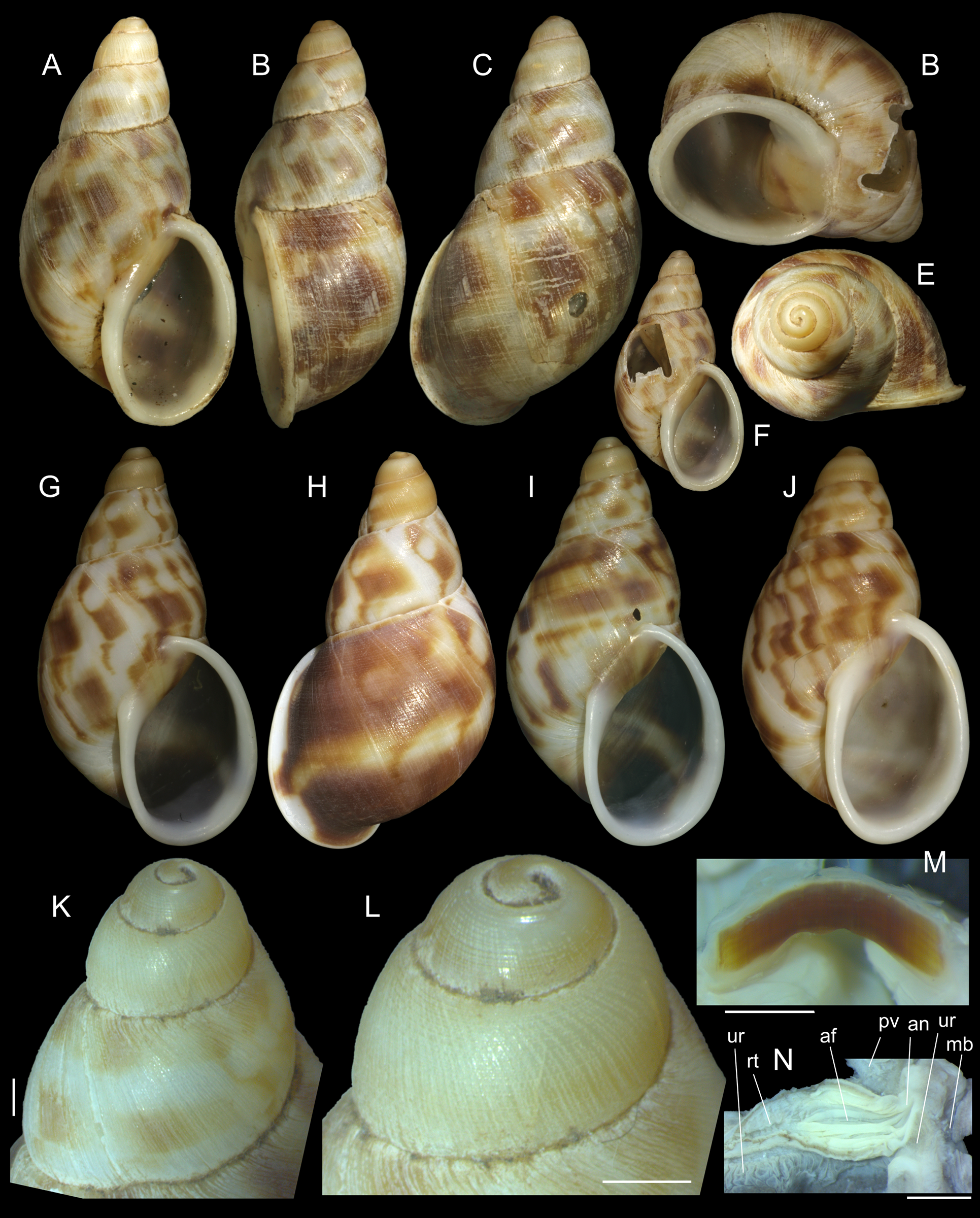
- Shell of Anthinus synchondrus

Scientific classification
- Kingdom: Animalia
- Phylum: Mollusca
- Class: Gastropoda
- Order: Stylommatophora
- Family: Odontostomidae
- Genus: Anthinus
- Species: A. synchondrus

Binomial name
- Anthinus synchondrus Simone, 2022

= Anthinus synchondrus =

Species of gastropod

Anthinus synchondrus is a species of air-breathing land snails, terrestrial pulmonate gastropod mollusks in the family Odontostomidae.

== Distribution ==
This species occurs in Minas Gerais, Brazil.
