= Gonyostomus goniostomus =

Conservation status
- Critically Endangered (IUCN 2.3)

Scientific classification
- Kingdom: Animalia
- Phylum: Mollusca
- Class: Gastropoda
- Order: Stylommatophora
- Family: Odontostomidae
- Genus: Gonyostomus
- Species: G. goniostomus

Binomial name
- Gonyostomus goniostomus Férussac, 1821

Synonyms
- Bulimus goniostomus (A. Férussac, 1821) superseded combination; Helix (Cochlogena) goniostoma A. Férussac, 1821 (basionym); Limnaeus papyraceus Spix, 1827 junior subjective synonym (junior synonym)

Species of gastropod

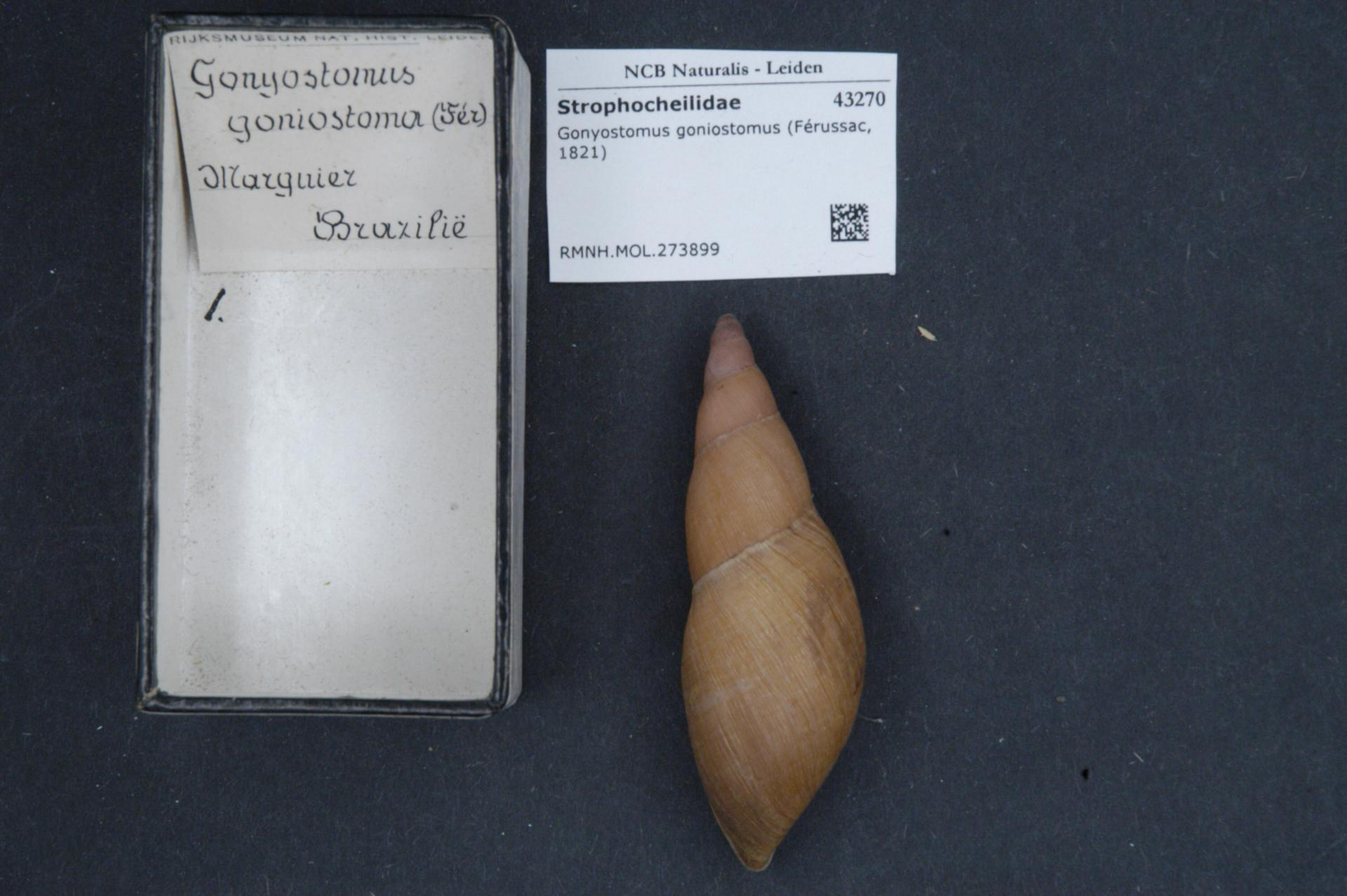
Gonyostomus goniostomus

Gonyostomus goniostomus is a species of air-breathing land snails, terrestrial pulmonate gastropod mollusks in the family Odontostomidae.

This species is endemic to Brazil. Although it has sometimes been thought to be extinct, it has nonetheless been found on the Buzios Island off the northern coast of the São Paulo State
