= Gonyostomus insularis =

Conservation status
- Vulnerable (IUCN 2.3)

Scientific classification
- Kingdom: Animalia
- Phylum: Mollusca
- Class: Gastropoda
- Order: Stylommatophora
- Family: Odontostomidae
- Genus: Gonyostomus
- Species: G. insularis

Binomial name
- Gonyostomus insularis Leme, 1974

Species of gastropod

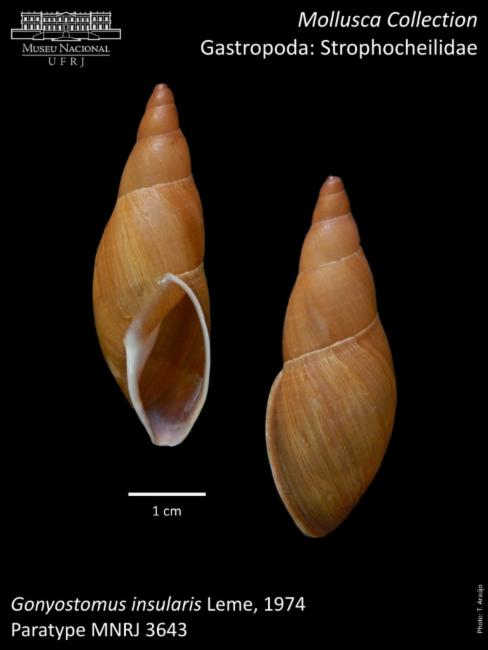
Paratype of Gonyostomus insularis Leme, 1974. From the National Museum of Brazil, Rio de Janeiro.

Gonyostomus insularis is a species of air-breathing land snails, terrestrial pulmonate gastropod mollusks in the family Odontostomidae.

This species is endemic to Brazil.
