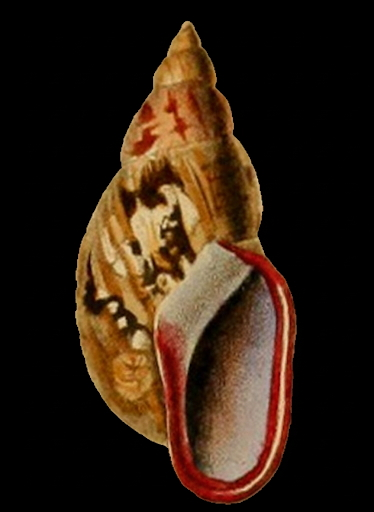
- Shell of Anthinus multicolor (holotype)

Scientific classification
- Kingdom: Animalia
- Phylum: Mollusca
- Class: Gastropoda
- Order: Stylommatophora
- Family: Odontostomidae
- Genus: Anthinus
- Species: A. multicolor

Binomial name
- Anthinus multicolor (Rang, 1831)

Synonyms
- Bulimus multicolor (Rang, 1831) superseded combination; Helix (Cochlogena) multicolor Rang, 1831 (basionym)

= Anthinus multicolor =

Species of gastropod

Anthinus multicolor is a species of air-breathing land snails, terrestrial pulmonate gastropod mollusks in the family Odontostomidae.

== Description ==
(Original description in French) Anthinus multicolor is a distinct species, both for the arrangement of its aperture and for its general shape and the diversity of its colors. It is thin, with an oval-conical shape, yet in no way transparent. Its surface is marked with very fine longitudinal striations, crossed by even finer transverse striations that are only visible with a magnifying glass. It is covered with a barely perceptible epidermis, which, through its transparency, reveals a combination of white, yellow, brown, and black, producing a tight cluster of diverse, irregular spots. These spots are pale near the apex, which is a light yellow, and well-defined and darker on the surface of the body whorl. The apex is almost sharp; the whorls, of which there are five and a half, are reasonably rounded, and their sutures are parallel. The body whorl is larger than all the others combined. The aperture is oblong, parallel to the axis in its direction and quite oblique in its plane. The columella is white; the columellar lip, as well as the outer lip, are flared, reflected, and of a magnificent purple color. The interior is a somewhat shiny dark blue.

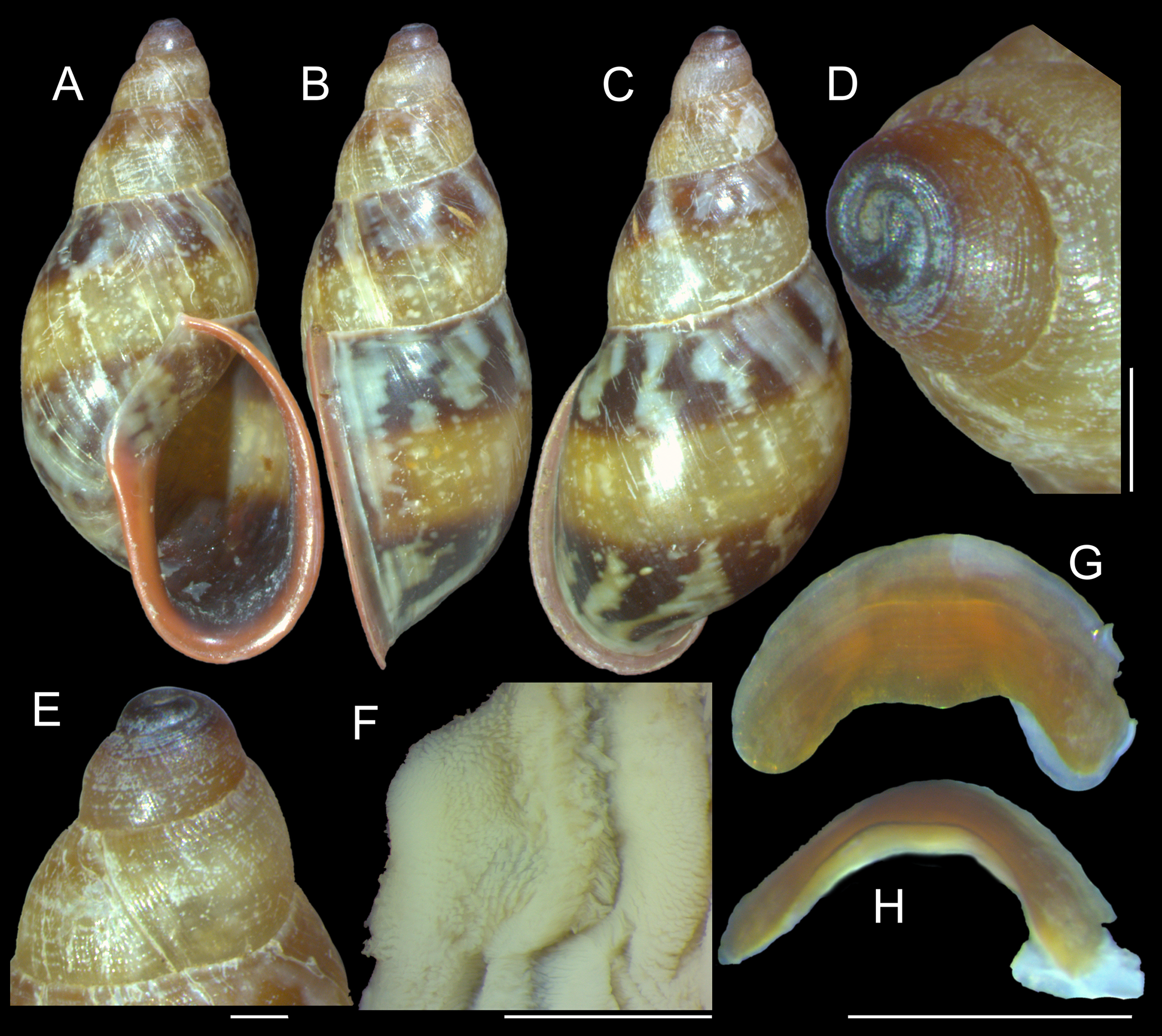
Anthinus multicolor

== Distribution ==
This species occurs in Brazil.
