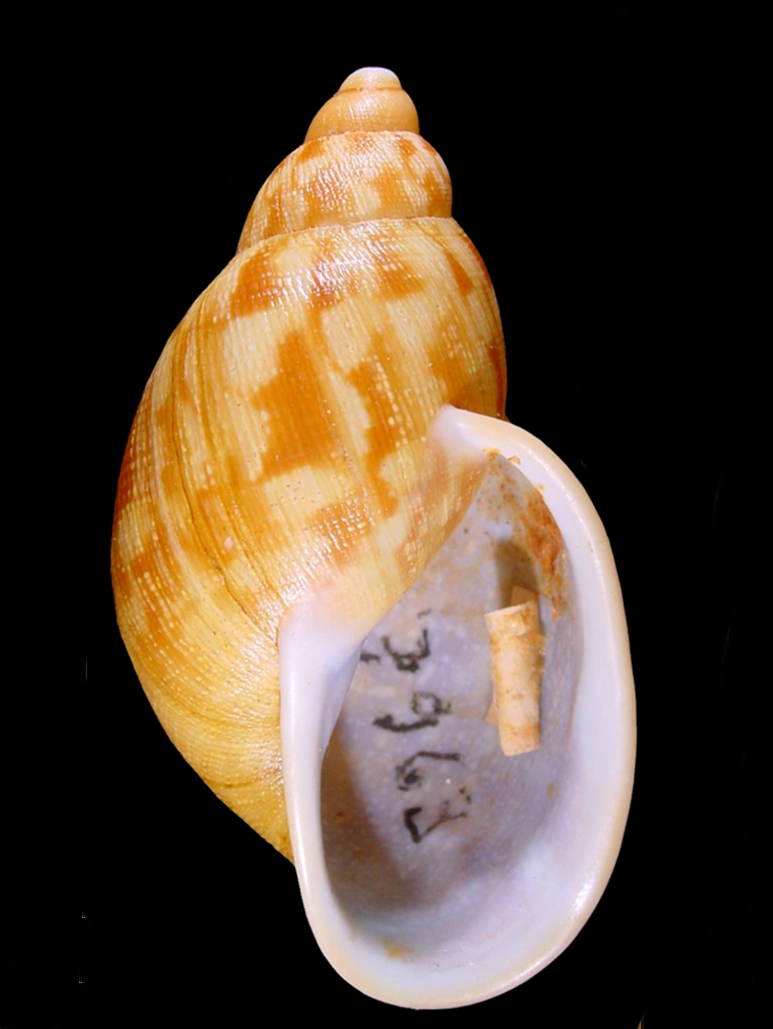
- Shell of Anthinus myersii

Scientific classification
- Kingdom: Animalia
- Phylum: Mollusca
- Class: Gastropoda
- Order: Stylommatophora
- Family: Odontostomidae
- Genus: Anthinus
- Species: A. myersii

Binomial name
- Anthinus myersii (G. B. Sowerby I, 1838)

Synonyms
- Bulimus miersii [sic] (incorrect subsequent spelling); Bulimus myersii (G. B. Sowerby I, 1838); Bulinus myersii G. B. Sowerby I, 1838 superseded combination

= Anthinus myersii =

Species of gastropod

Anthinus myersii is a species of air-breathing land snails, terrestrial pulmonate gastropod mollusks in the family Odontostomidae.

== Description ==
The length of the shell attains 53 mm.

== Distribution ==
This species occurs in Brazil.
