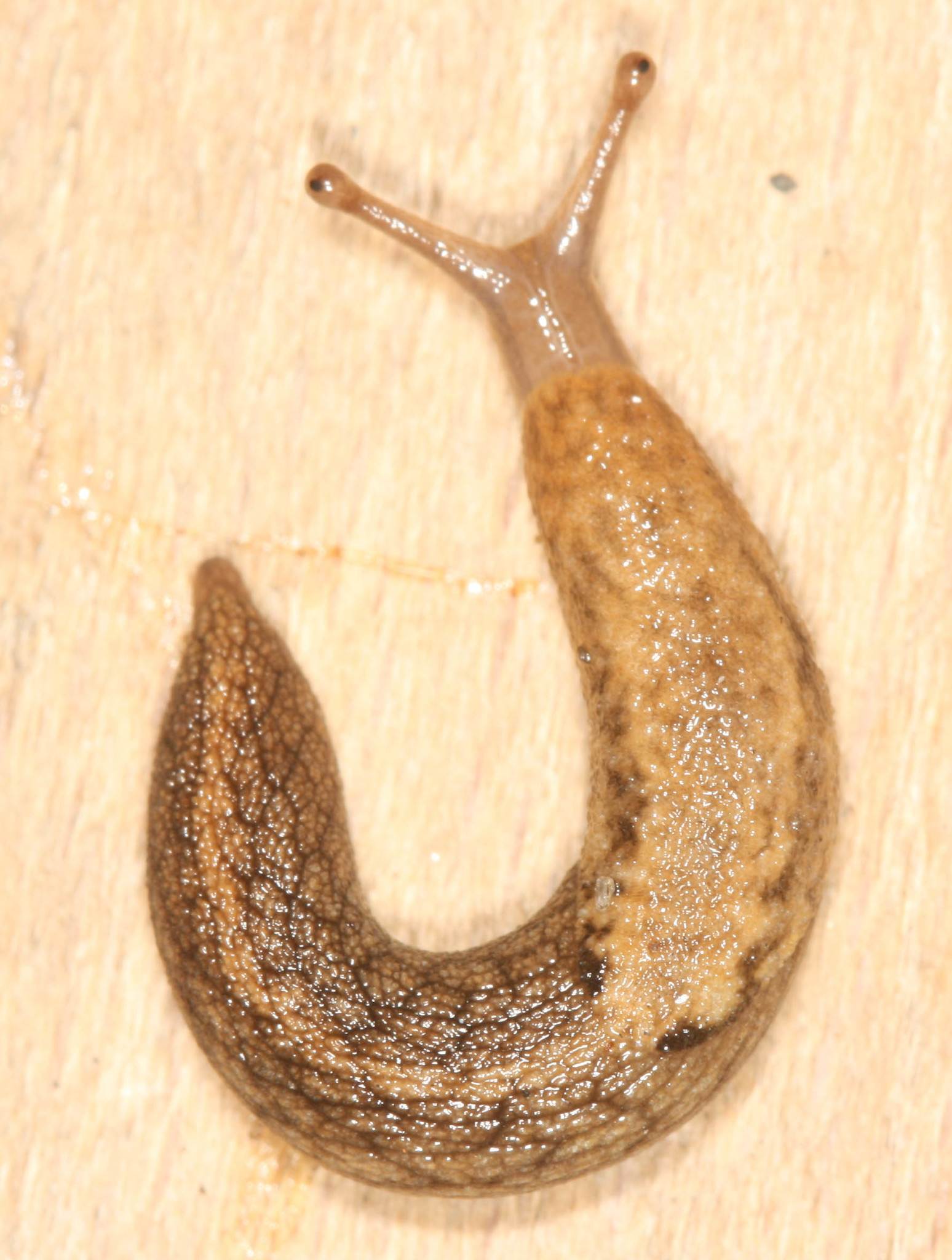
- Prophysaon andersonii

Scientific classification
- Kingdom: Animalia
- Phylum: Mollusca
- Class: Gastropoda
- Order: Stylommatophora
- Infraorder: Arionoidei
- Superfamily: Arionoidea
- Family: Ariolimacidae
- Genus: Prophysaon; Bland & W. G. Binney, 1873

Synonyms
- Limacarion J.G. Cooper, 1879; Phenacarion Cockerell, 1890; Prophysaon (Mimetarion) Pilsbry, 1948· accepted, alternate representation; Prophysaon (Prophysaon) Bland & W.G. Binney, 1873· accepted, alternate representation

= Prophysaon =

Genus of gastropods

Prophysaon, common name taildropper slugs, is a genus of air-breathing land slugs, terrestrial pulmonate gastropod mollusks in the family Ariolimacidae.

These slugs can self-amputate (autotomy) a portion of their tail, a behavior observed in the species Prophysaon andersonii.

== Distribution ==
This genus of slugs occurs in North America, including California and Oregon.

== Species ==
Species in the genus Prophysaon include 10 species (9 according to Turgeon et al. 1998 plus one known undescribed species):

- Prophysaon andersonii (J. G. Cooper, 1872) - reticulate taildropper, Anderson's taildropper slug
- Prophysaon boreale Pilsbry, 1948 - northern taildropper
- Prophysaon coeruleum Cockerell, 1890 - blue-gray taildropper
- Prophysaon dubium Cockerell, 1890 - papillose taildropper
- Prophysaon fasciatum Cockerell in W. G. Binney - banded taildropper
- Prophysaon foliolatum (Gould, 1851) - yellow-bordered taildropper
- Prophysaon humile Cockerell, 1890 - smoky taildropper
- Prophysaon obscurum (Cockerell, 1890) - mottled taildropper
- Prophysaon vanattae Pilsbry, 1948 - scarlet-backed taildropper
  - Prophysaon vanattae var. pardalis
- Prophysaon undescribed species from Siskiyou County, California.

Species brought into synonymy

- Prophysaon flavum Cockerell, 1890: synonym of Prophysaon andersonii (J.G. Cooper, 1872)
- Prophysaon hemphilli Bland & W. G. Binney, 1873: synonym of Prophysaon andersonii (J.G. Cooper, 1872)
- Prophysaon pacificum Cockerell, 1890: synonym of Prophysaon andersonii (J.G. Cooper, 1872)
