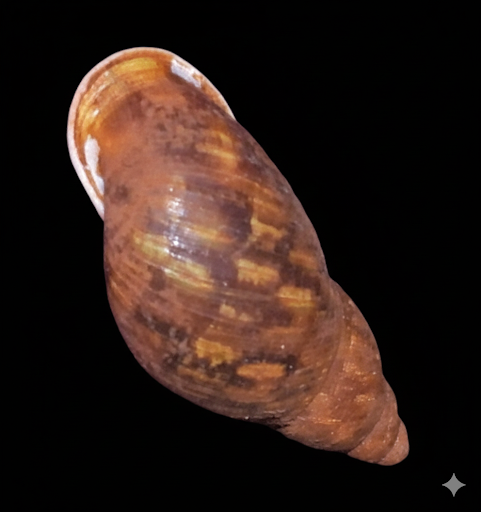
- Shell of Anthinus albolabiatus

Scientific classification
- Kingdom: Animalia
- Phylum: Mollusca
- Class: Gastropoda
- Order: Stylommatophora
- Family: Odontostomidae
- Genus: Anthinus
- Species: A. albolabiatus

Binomial name
- Anthinus albolabiatus (Jaeckel, 1927)

Synonyms
- Gonyostomus turnix var. albolabiatus Jaeckel, 1927 (basionym)

= Anthinus albolabiatus =

Species of gastropod

Anthinus albolabiatus is a species of air-breathing land snails, terrestrial pulmonate gastropod mollusks in the family Odontostomidae.
