= Van Natta =

Van Natta or VanNatta is a surname. Notable people with the surname include:

- Bruce H. Van Natta, American engineer and IMSAI co-founder
- Don Van Natta, Jr. (born 1964), American writer
- Jamie Van Natta (born 1978), American archer
- Owen Van Natta, American businessman

== See also ==
- Van Etten
- Van Atta
