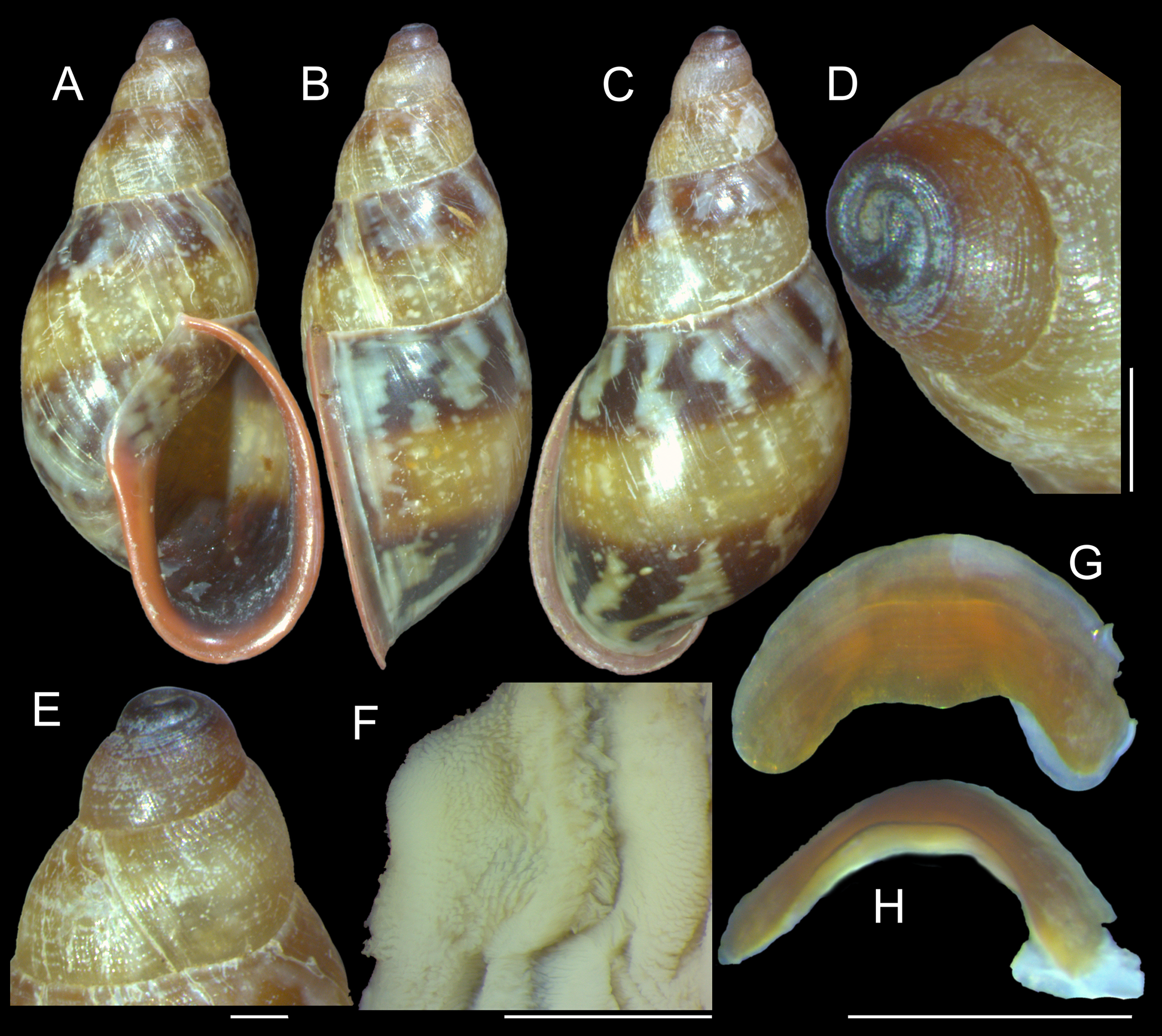
- Shell of Anthinus multicolor

Scientific classification
- Kingdom: Animalia
- Phylum: Mollusca
- Class: Gastropoda
- Order: Stylommatophora
- Family: Odontostomidae
- Genus: Anthinus; Albers, 1850

Synonyms
- Bulimus (Anthinus) Albers, 1850 (original rank)

= Anthinus (gastropod) =

Genus of gastropods

Anthinus is a genus of air-breathing land snails, terrestrial pulmonate gastropod mollusks in the family Odontostomidae.

== Characteristics ==
(Originally described in Latin) The shell is perforated with a slit-like opening and is oblong-conical in shape. Its spire is somewhat turreted, and it has 6 to 7 whorls, with the body whorl being nearly equal in size to the spire. The columella (the central axis of the shell) is either narrow or has dentate folds. The aperture is oval-oblong and a brownish-violet color on the inside. The peristome (outer lip) is widely expanded, and the columellar margin is both dilated and open.

== Species ==
Species within the genus Anthinus include:

- Anthinus albolabiatus (Jaeckel, 1927)
- Anthinus morenus Simone, 2022
- Anthinus multicolor (Rang, 1831)
- Anthinus myersii (G. B. Sowerby I, 1838)
- Anthinus savanicus Simone, 2022
- Anthinus synchondrus Simone, 2022
- Anthinus turnix (A. Gould, 1846)
- Anthinus vailanti Simone, 2022

Synonyms

- Anthinus henselii (Martens, 1868): synonym of Drymaeus henselii (Martens, 1868)
