= Van Atta =

Van Atta or Vanatta is a surname of Dutch origin. Notable people with the surname include:

- Bob Vanatta (1918–2016), American basketball coach
- Dale Van Atta (born 1951), American journalist and writer
- Lee Van Atta (1922–2002), American child actor
- Russ Van Atta (1906–1986), American baseball player

== Other ==
- Van Atta High, American musical group
- Vanatta, Ohio
- Vanatta Apartments, historic building in Craig, Colorado

== See also ==
- Van Etten
- Van Natta
