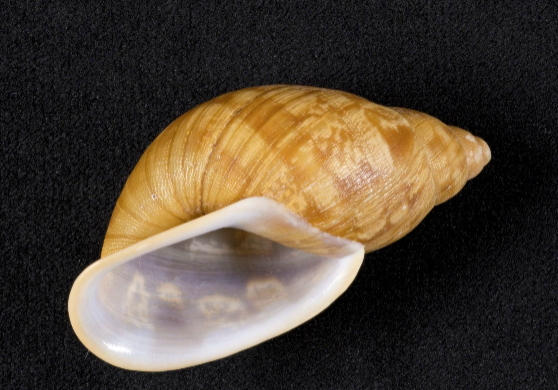
- Shell of Anthinus turnix

Scientific classification
- Kingdom: Animalia
- Phylum: Mollusca
- Class: Gastropoda
- Order: Stylommatophora
- Family: Odontostomidae
- Genus: Anthinus
- Species: A. turnix

Binomial name
- Anthinus turnix (A. Gould, 1846)

Synonyms
- Bulimus turnix A. Gould, 1846 (superseded combination); Gonyostomus turnix (A. Gould, 1846) (superseded combination)

= Anthinus turnix =

Species of gastropod

Anthinus turnix is a species of air-breathing land snails, terrestrial pulmonate gastropod mollusks in the family Odontostomidae.

== Distribution ==
This species is found in Rio de Janeiro, Brazil.
