= Van Etten =

Van Etten is a surname. Americans with the surname Van Etten descend from Jacobus Jansen Van Etten who was born in the Dutch village of Etten.

== Notable people with the surname include ==
- Chris Van Etten, American television writer
- Hudson Van Etten (1874–1941), United States Navy sailor
- Jane Van Etten (1869–1950), American composer
- Sharon Van Etten (born 1981), American singer-songwriter

== Other ==
- Van Etten, New York, a town in Chemung County, New York, United States
- Van Etten (hamlet), New York, former village within Van Etten, New York
- Vanetten House, historic house in Little Rock, Arkansas, United States
- Van Etten Lake, lake in Iosco County, Michigan, United States

== See also ==
- Van Atta
- Van Natta
