= Vanetten House =

Historic house in Arkansas, United States

- U.S. National Register of Historic Places
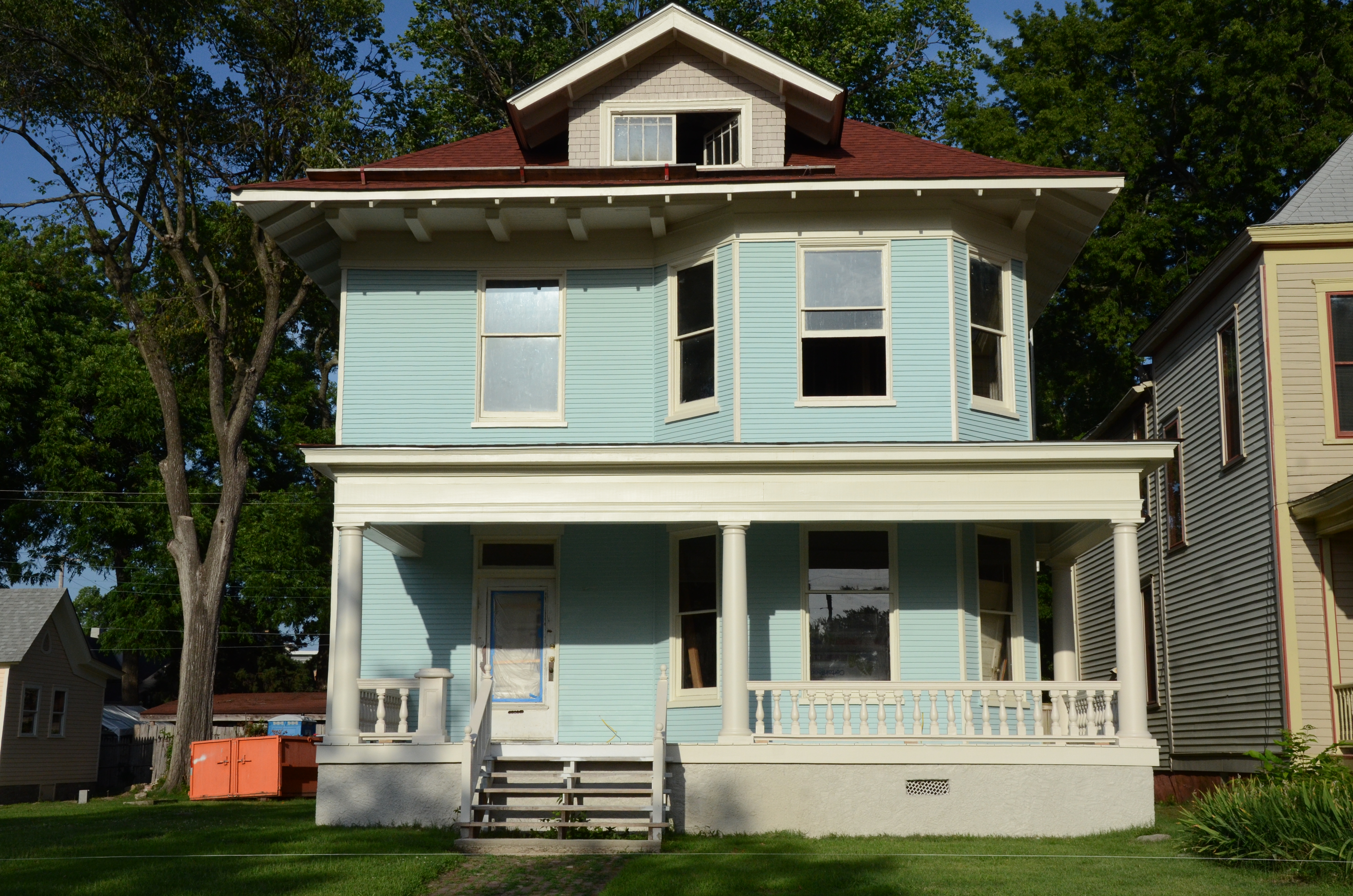

- Location within Arkansas Location within the United States
- Location: 1012 Cumberland, Little Rock, Arkansas
- Coordinates: 34°44′18″N 92°16′11″W
- Area: less than one acre
- Built: 1900
- Architect: Charles L. Thompson
- Architectural style: Colonial Revival
- MPS: Thompson, Charles L., Design Collection TR
- NRHP reference No.: 82000933
- Added to NRHP: December 22, 1982

The Vanetten House is a historic house at 1012 Cumberland Street in Little Rock, Arkansas. It is a two-story wood frame American Foursquare house, with a dormered hip roof, weatherboard siding, and brick foundation. The roof and dormers have extended eaves with exposed rafters, and a single-story porch wraps across the front and around one side, supported by Ionic columns. Built about 1900, it was designed by Arkansas architect Charles L. Thompson, and is one of his more elaborate Foursquare designs.

The house was listed on the National Register of Historic Places in 1982.

== See also ==
- National Register of Historic Places listings in Little Rock, Arkansas
