= Vanatta, Ohio =

Unincorporated community in Ohio

Coordinates: 40°07′33″N 82°25′46″W

Vanatta is an unincorporated community in Licking County, in the U.S. state of Ohio.

== History ==
Vanatta had its start when the railroad was extended to that point. A post office called Vanatta was established in 1857, and remained in operation until 1955.
