= Van Atta High =

American emo/screamo band

Van Atta High (or VAH) was an American emo/screamo band from New Jersey, United States, formed in 2006, and disbanded on May 14, 2010.

== History ==
Founding member Steve Kellner (vocals) formed Van Atta High in June 2006 with original members Santino Loconte (drums), Socrates Moutsakis (guitar), Kyle Brazier (guitar) and Jarret Gallipoli (bass). In 2006, the band released their first EP entitled We Are The Captivated. Long standing members Stephen Jasko (guitar) and Clark Starace (bass) were recruited to the group in 2007 and replaced Gallipoli and Brazier. Armed with this first EP and their charismatic stage presence, Van Atta High quickly became a crowd favorite among the local New Jersey band circuit. Some of their most well-known songs include "Call Me Jersey," "Birthday Girl," and their pop rock cover of the Starland Vocal Band 1970s hit "Afternoon Delight" (contracted with S1 Songs, a music publishing company).

With the addition of Jasko and Starace, the band released Run Like Hell EP in fall 2007. After establishing a core fan-base in New Jersey and releasing Run Like Hell, the band managed to land spots on Taste of Chaos 2007, Vans Warped Tour 2007 & 2008 and The Bamboozle 2008 & 2009. These festival appearances further escalated the band's exposure and buzz, generating local and national press coverage including being named Alternative Press Magazine's "Unsigned Band of the Month" in August 2008. Some venues they have played include the Starland Ballroom (Sayreville, NJ), the School of Rock (South Hackensack, NJ), Webster Hall (NYC), the Landmark Theater (Long Island), the Knitting Factory (NYC) and Crocodile Rock Cafe (Allentown, PA). Van Atta High has shared the stage as local openers for The Used, Senses Fail, Thirty Seconds to Mars, Just Surrender, Billy Talent, Pierce the Veil, Every Avenue, Jet Lag Gemini and Emarosa, to name just a few.

Van Atta High inked a licensing agreement for one EP with indie label Thriving/Tragic Hero Records (prior home to Sky Eats Airplane and Emarosa). On March 10, 2009, Van Atta High released their first nationally distributed record entitled Doin' Somethin' Right (EP).

Van Atta High released their final record in January 2010. entitled Love Blitz:United (EP).

== Death of Jarret Gallipoli ==
Former VAH bass player and original member, Jarret Gallipoli, was killed in a car accident on Interstate 68 after an exploratory visit to West Virginia University on April 11, 2010. Jarret was a student at Bergen Community College who had just recently been accepted to Pace University and West Virginia University. His 2006 Honda Civic skidded through the center median and struck a guard rail, according to Maryland State Police.

Gallipoli was driving. According to police he died instantly. The impact stopped his heart. Another passenger, who was sitting in the backseat and not wearing a seatbelt, was ejected from the vehicle through the windshield and landed at the bottom of the embankment. A female passenger in the front is the sole survivor of the accident.

Both men were pronounced dead at the scene, near Keysers Ridge.

== The End of VAH ==
On May 13, 2010, the band released a blog post on their MySpace informing their fans they would break up and mentioned their last show at School of Rock in South Hackensack, NJ which took place in August 2010. Despite the band gaining massive popularity in the NJ underground, VAH failed to ever garner the major commercial success of some their immediate predecessor's (My Chemical Romance, Senses Fail, etc.). The band have since dispersed in different directions to pursue other careers.

== Reunion Show ==
Van Atta High reunited for a sold out one-night only show, on August 24, 2012, at Mexicali Live in Teaneck, NJ.

== Members ==
=== Past members ===
Steve Kellner: vocals/guitar (2006–2010)
Stephen Jasko: guitar (2007–2010)
Clark Starace: bass guitar(2007–2010)
Glenn Petnel: drums (2009–2010)

== Former members ==
Santino LeCunt: drums (2006–2008)
Socrates Moutsakis: guitar (2006–2008)
Kyle Brazier: guitar (2006–2007)
Justin Maikisch: guitar, bagpipes (2008–2009)
Jarret Gallipoli: bass (2006–2007)

Session members:

Mike Costello: guitar (2007–2009)

== Discography ==
We Are the Captivated EP (2006, Self-released)
Run Like Hell EP (2007, Self-released)
Doin' Somethin' Right EP (2009, Thriving/Tragic Hero Records)
Love Blitz:United EP (2010, Self-released)

== Videography ==
"Call Me Jersey" (2008)
"Afternoon Delight" (2009)
"Birthday Girl" (2009)
"Little Fingers" (2010)
