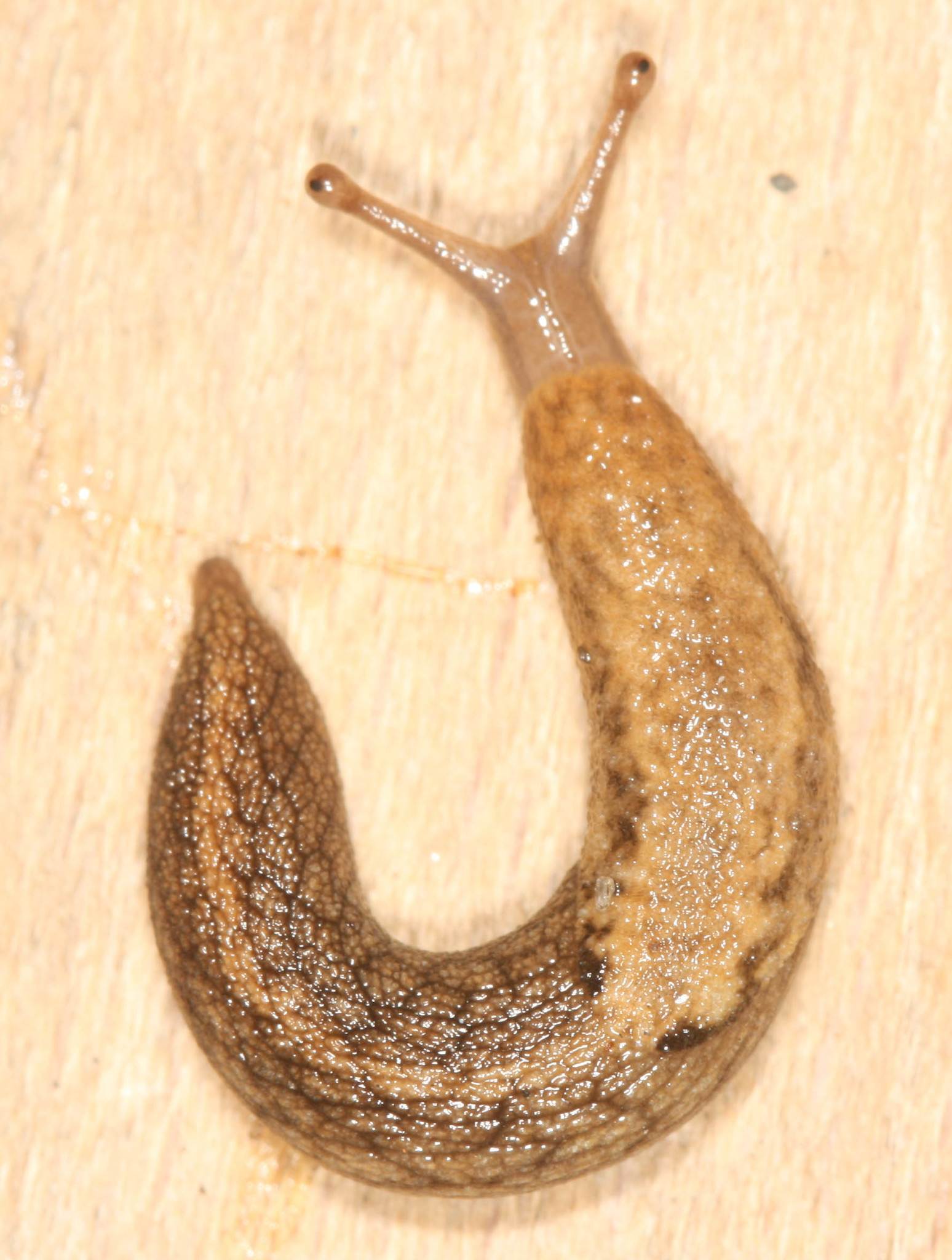

Conservation status
- Secure (NatureServe)

Scientific classification
- Kingdom: Animalia
- Phylum: Mollusca
- Class: Gastropoda
- Order: Stylommatophora
- Family: Ariolimacidae
- Genus: Prophysaon
- Species: P. andersonii

Binomial name
- Prophysaon andersonii (J.G. Cooper, 1872)

= Prophysaon andersonii =

Species of gastropod

Prophysaon andersonii, common name the reticulate taildropper, is a species of air-breathing land slug, a terrestrial pulmonate gastropod mollusk in the family Ariolimacidae endemic to Western North America.

These slugs are notable for being able to self-amputate (autotomy) a portion of their tail.

== Description ==
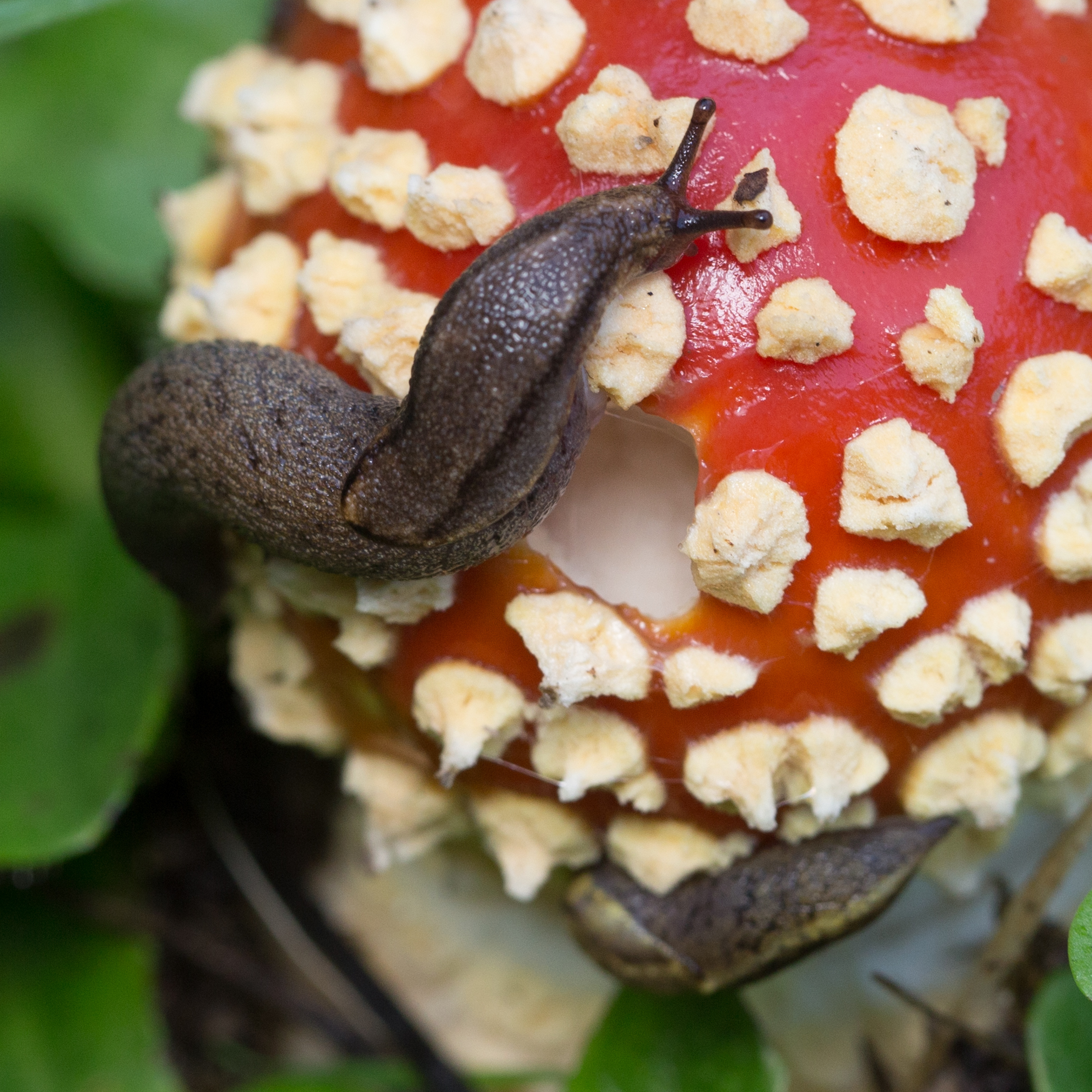
Feeding on fly agaric, in California

Adults of this slug species are about 50 mm when active, but can exceed 60 mm in length. The color of the body is a grayish or reddish brown, or can be yellowish. The dorsum is furrowed with a reticulated pattern like a mesh of diamond shapes. The mantle of the slug has two dark lateral bands. The mucus is yellow or orange.

One of the most common colorations found is generally a grey coloration, mostly found off the coast.

This species does not have any dark bands on the foot of the slug, only reticulation.

The slugs are browner as one goes inland towards California.

This species can also be distinguished by male genitalia, which are always smaller than the muscular body of the epiphallus. This is generally not used due to the distinctive reticulated pattern of this slug .

== Similar species ==
Prophysaon foliolatum is a similar species to Prophysaon andersonii but has a distinct yellow band, that never occurs on Prophysaon andersonii.

== Distribution ==
This species of slug occurs on the West Coast of North America, including California, Oregon, Idaho, and part of Montana.

== Gallery ==
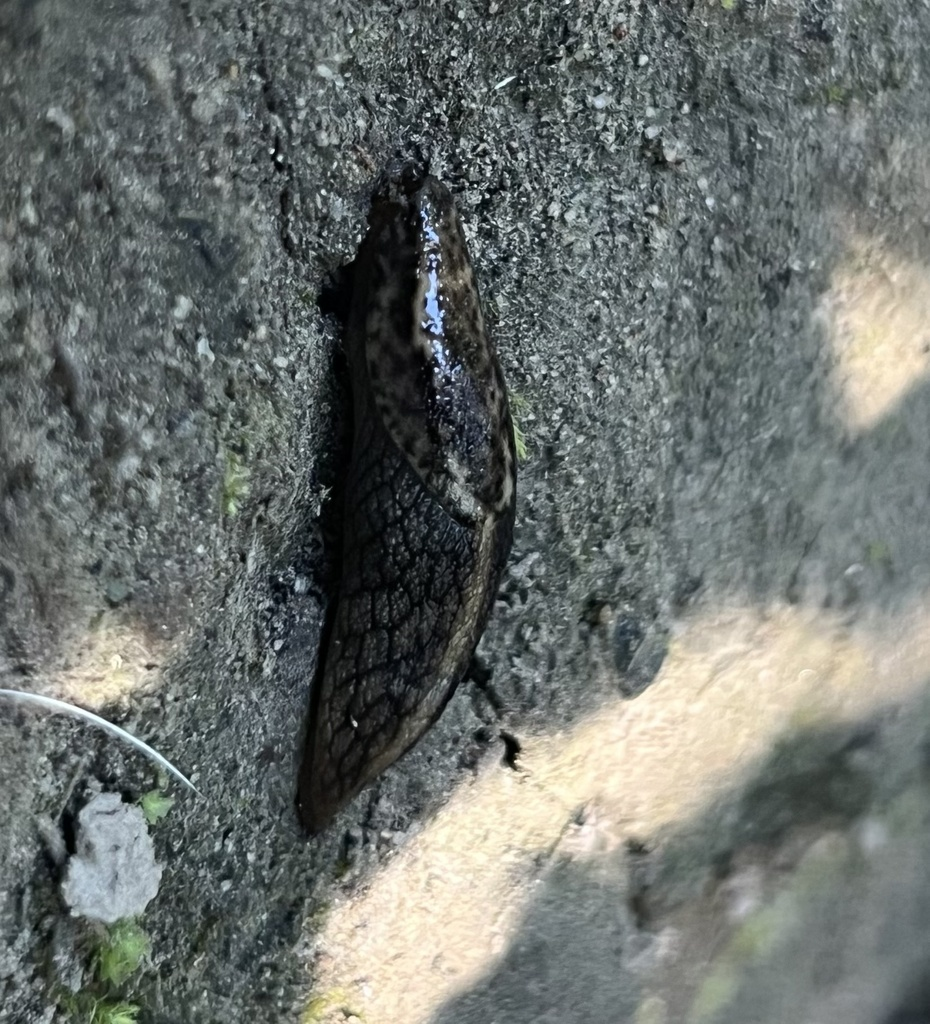
a dark Prophysaon andersonii crossing the trail of Deadhorse Canyon Trail, in King County, WA

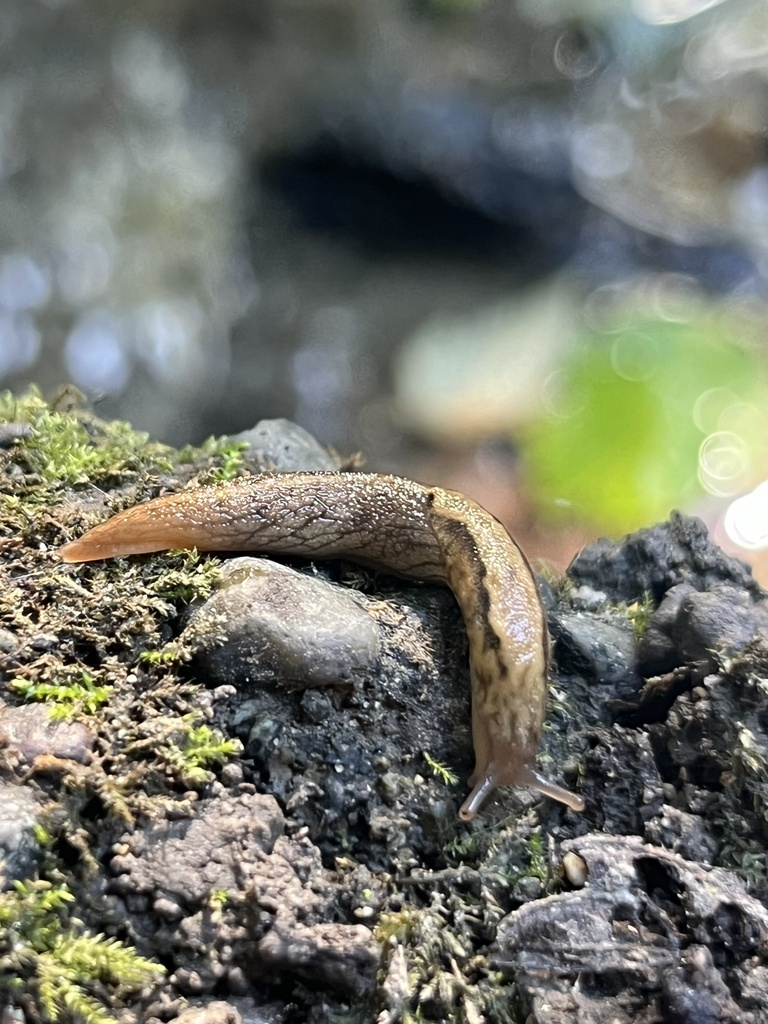
Prophysaon andersonii on top of a wall found in Deadhorse Canyon, a nature trail in King County, WA

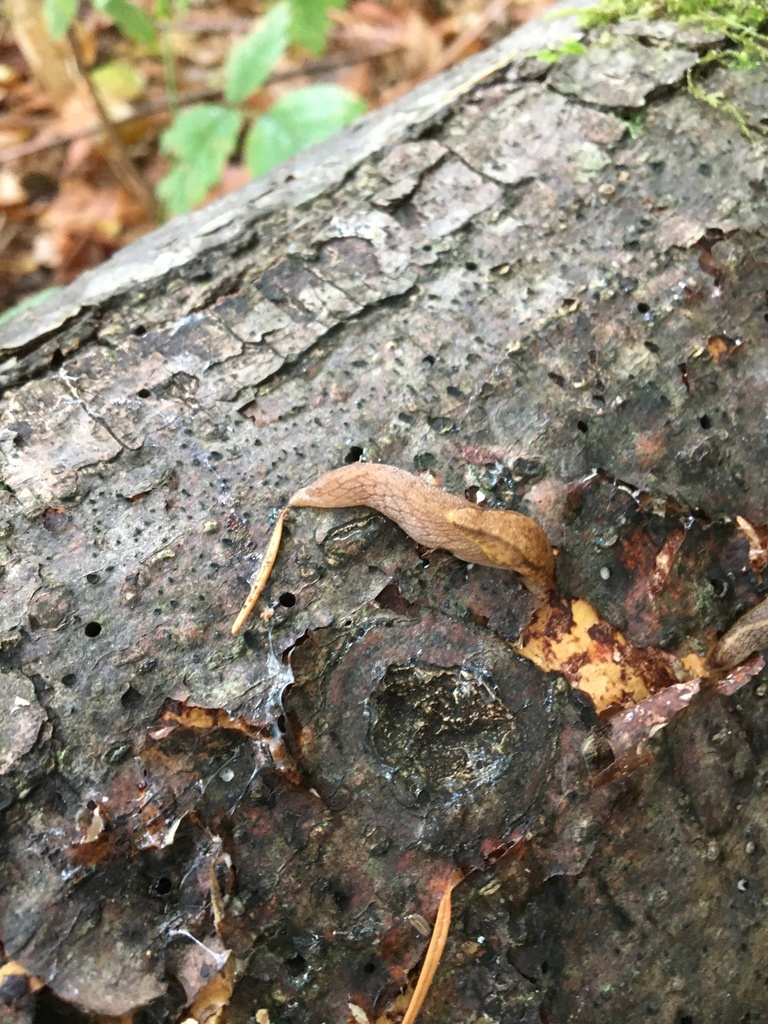
a Prophysaon andersonii on a log found in Lincoln Park, a city park in West Seattle, WA
