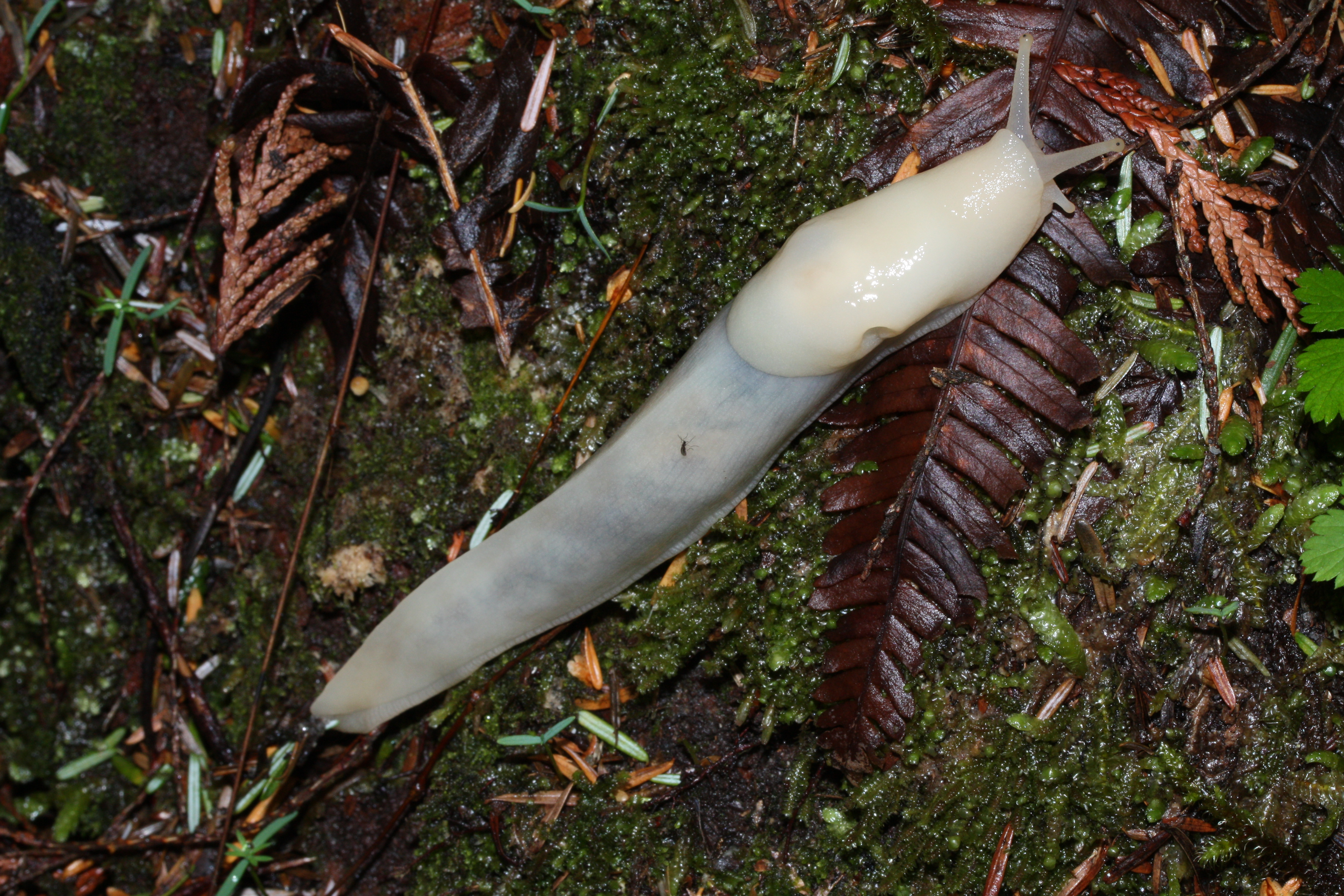
- A live individual of Ariolimax columbianus in the wild, at Mount Baker-Snoqualmie National Forest

Scientific classification
- Kingdom: Animalia
- Phylum: Mollusca
- Class: Gastropoda
- Order: Stylommatophora
- Suborder: Helicina
- Infraorder: Arionoidei
- Superfamily: Arionoidea
- Family: Ariolimacidae; Pilsbry & Vanatta, 1898

Genera
- See text

= Ariolimacidae =

Family of gastropods

Ariolimacidae is a family of air-breathing land slugs, terrestrial pulmonate gastropod mollusks in the superfamily Arionoidea (according to the taxonomy of the Gastropoda by Bouchet & Rocroi, 2005).

== Subfamilies and genera ==
The family Ariolimacidae consists of the two subfamilies:

- Ariolimacinae Pilsbry & Vanatta, 1898
- Zacoleinae Webb, 1959

Genera in the family Ariolimacidae include:

Ariolimacinae

- Anadenulus Cockerell, 1890
- Ariolimax Mörch, 1859 - banana slug - the type genus of the family Ariolimacidae
- Hesperarion Simroth, 1891
- Magnipelta Pilsbry, 1953
- Meadarion Pilsbry, 1948
- Prophysaon Bland & W.G. Binney, 1873
- Udosarx Webb, 1959

Zacoleinae

- Zacoleus Pilsbry, 1903 - the type genus of the subfamily Zacoleinae

Genera brought into synonymy

- Aphallarion Pilsbry & Vanatta, 1896: synonym of Ariolimax Mörch, 1859
- Limacarion J.G. Cooper, 1879: synonym of Prophysaon Bland & W.G. Binney, 1873
- Phenacarion Cockerell, 1890: synonym of Prophysaon Bland & W.G. Binney, 1873
