= Odontostomidae =

Scientific classification
- Kingdom: Animalia
- Phylum: Mollusca
- Class: Gastropoda
- Order: Stylommatophora
- Suborder: Helicina
- Infraorder: Rhytidoidei
- Superfamily: Rhytidoidea
- Family: Odontostomidae; Pilsbry & Vanatta, 1898

Genera
- See text

Synonyms
- Odontostominae Pilsbry & Vanatta, 1898 superseded rank; Odontostomini Pilsbry & Vanatta, 1898

Family of gastropods

Odontostomidae is a taxonomic family of medium-sized to large, air-breathing, tropical and sub-tropical land snails, terrestrial pulmonate gastropod molluscs belonging to the superfamily Rhytidoidea.

== Taxonomy ==
=== 2005 taxonomy ===
This taxon was placed as the tribe Odontostomini, in the subfamily Bulimulinae, within the family Orthalicidae, according to the taxonomy of the Gastropoda (Bouchet & Rocroi, 2005).

=== 2010 taxonomy ===
Breure et al. (2010) elevated Odontostomini to Odontostomidae.

== Genera ==
Genera in the family Odontostomidae include:

- Anthinus Albers, 1850
- Gonyostomus H. Beck, 1837
- Odontostomus Beck, 1837 - type genus
- Spixia Pilsbry & Vanatta, 1898: synonym of Clessinia Doering, 1875

Synonyms

- Macrodontes Swainson, 1840: synonym of Odontostomus H. Beck, 1837 (junior subjective synonym)
- Macrodontopsis Thiele, 1931: synonym of Odontostomus H. Beck, 1837 (junior subjective synonym)
- Pantagruelina Forcart, 1946: synonym of Burringtonia Parodiz, 1944 (junior objective synonym)

== Description ==
Species in this genus have the aperture obstructed by internal lamellae, folds or teeth (rarely absent by degeneration); the base is perforate or has an umbilical suture; and the genitalia are extremely lengthened. Jaw either plaited or solid.

These genera are confined to South America east of the Andes, and with the exception of some species, south of the Amazon. That the whole series had its inception in a form in which the characteristic apertural teeth had already been developed, is demonstrated by the fact that these lamella and folds are clearly homologous throughout the species of the several genera.
