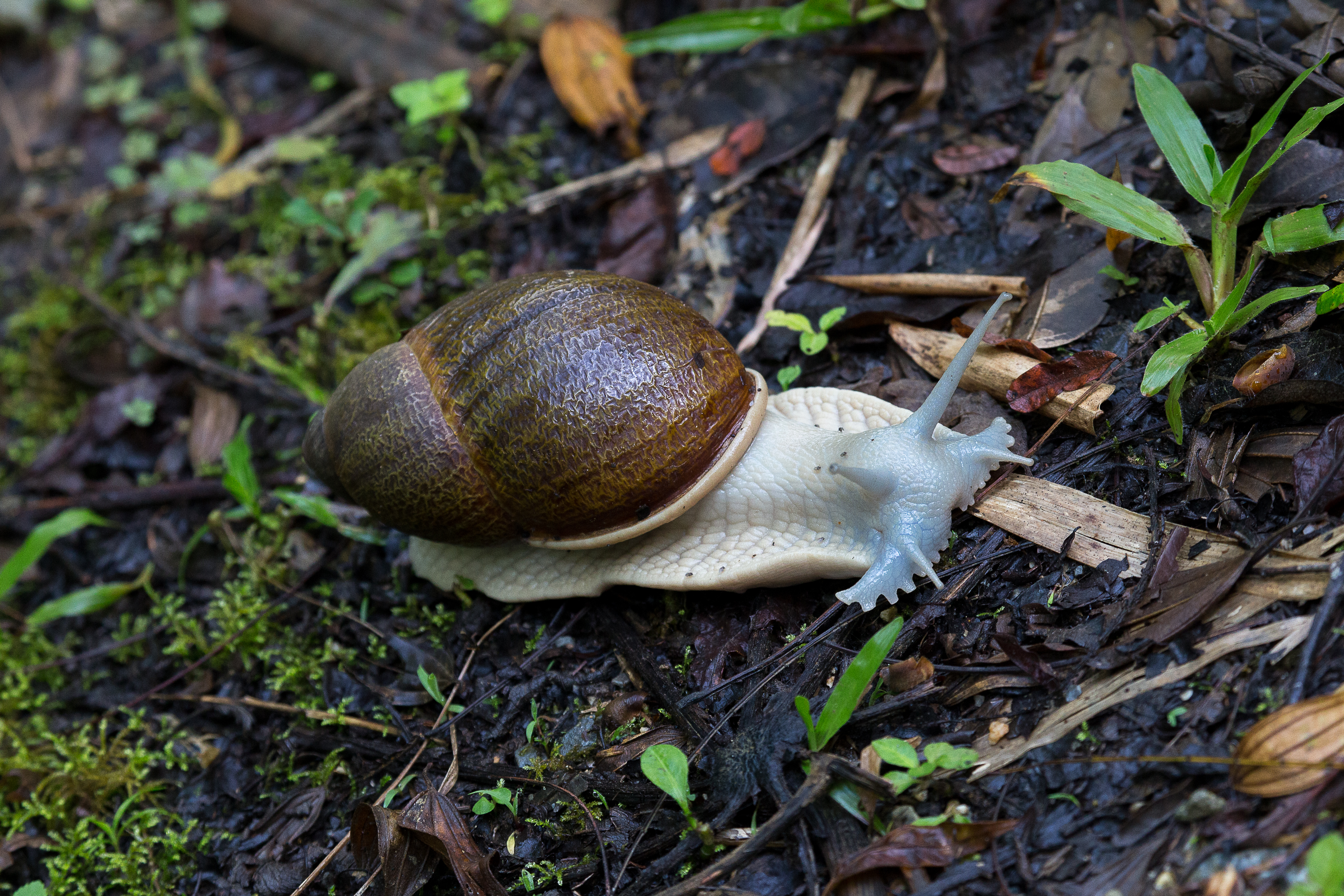
- A live specimen of M. dryades at the Intervales State Park, Brazil

Scientific classification
- Kingdom: Animalia
- Phylum: Mollusca
- Class: Gastropoda
- Order: Stylommatophora
- Family: Strophocheilidae
- Genus: Megalobulimus
- Species: M. dryades

Binomial name
- Megalobulimus dryades Fontenelle, Simone & Cavallari, 2021
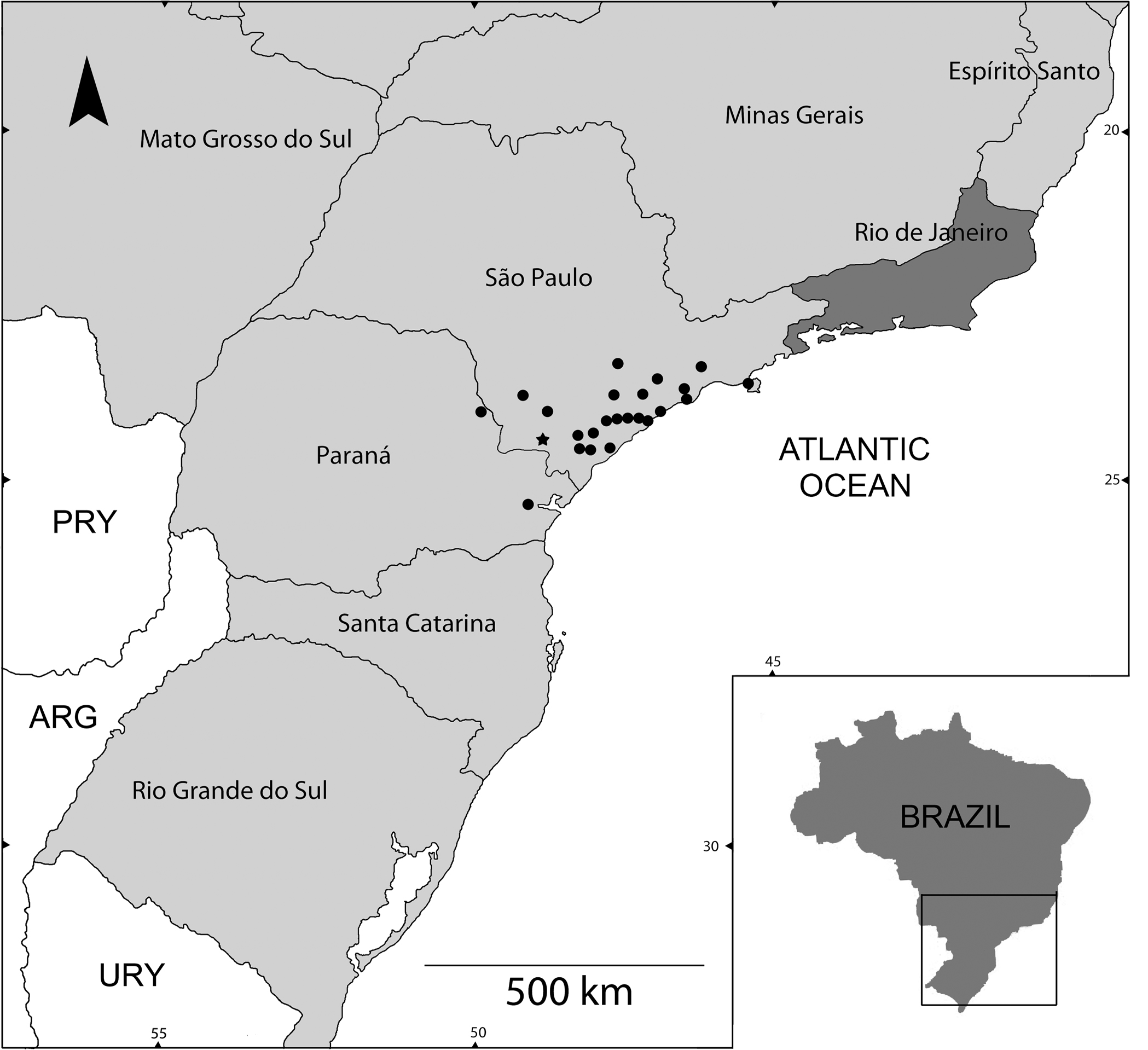
- Distribution of Megalobulimus dryades. Dots indicate occurrence records; star indicates the type locality.

Synonyms
- Megalolulimus gummatus (non Hidalgo, 1870)

= Megalobulimus dryades =

Species of terrestrial gastropod from Brazil

Megalobulimus dryades is a species of air-breathing land snail, a terrestrial gastropod mollusc in the family Strophocheilidae. It is endemic to Brazil's Atlantic Forest, particularly in the southeastern region encompassing parts of São Paulo and Paraná states. Officially described in 2021, this species was previously misidentified as Megalobulimus gummatus, but distinctive morphological and anatomical traits, especially in the shell and reproductive system, have led to its recognition as a separate species.

The snail's shell is ovate-conical and robust, reaching lengths of up to 120 mm, with a reddish-ochre color and a characteristic pale subsutural band and darker protoconch. Anatomically, it is notable for a long convoluted penis with two flagella, and unique radular and jaw structures. Reproductive studies in captivity revealed that oviposition occurs seasonally, with clutches of 2–5 eggs and a hatching success rate around 52%. The species primarily inhabits the Ribeira de Iguape River basin but may have a broader range due to environmental tolerance and possible anthropogenic dispersion. Although not yet assessed by the IUCN, M. dryades is likely under threat due to habitat loss, forest fragmentation, and several other pressing concerns in the highly threatened Atlantic Forest biome, as declines have already been reported in southern populations of the species.

== Taxonomy and nomenclature ==
Megalobulimus dryades belongs to the family Strophocheilidae, a group of large terrestrial snails predominantly distributed in South America. This species was formally described in 2021 by researchers following detailed morphological and anatomical studies. Before its description, individuals of M. dryades were often misidentified as Megalobulimus gummatus, another species of the same genus. However, comparative analyses revealed consistent differences in shell morphology, as well as distinctive anatomical features in the reproductive system. These differences warranted the recognition of M. dryades as a separate species. The specific epithet, dryades, is derived from the dryads of Greek mythology, tree nymphs associated with forests. This name emphasizes the species' close ecological ties to the Atlantic Forest biome, one of the most biodiverse and threatened ecosystems in the world.

== Description ==
=== Shell ===
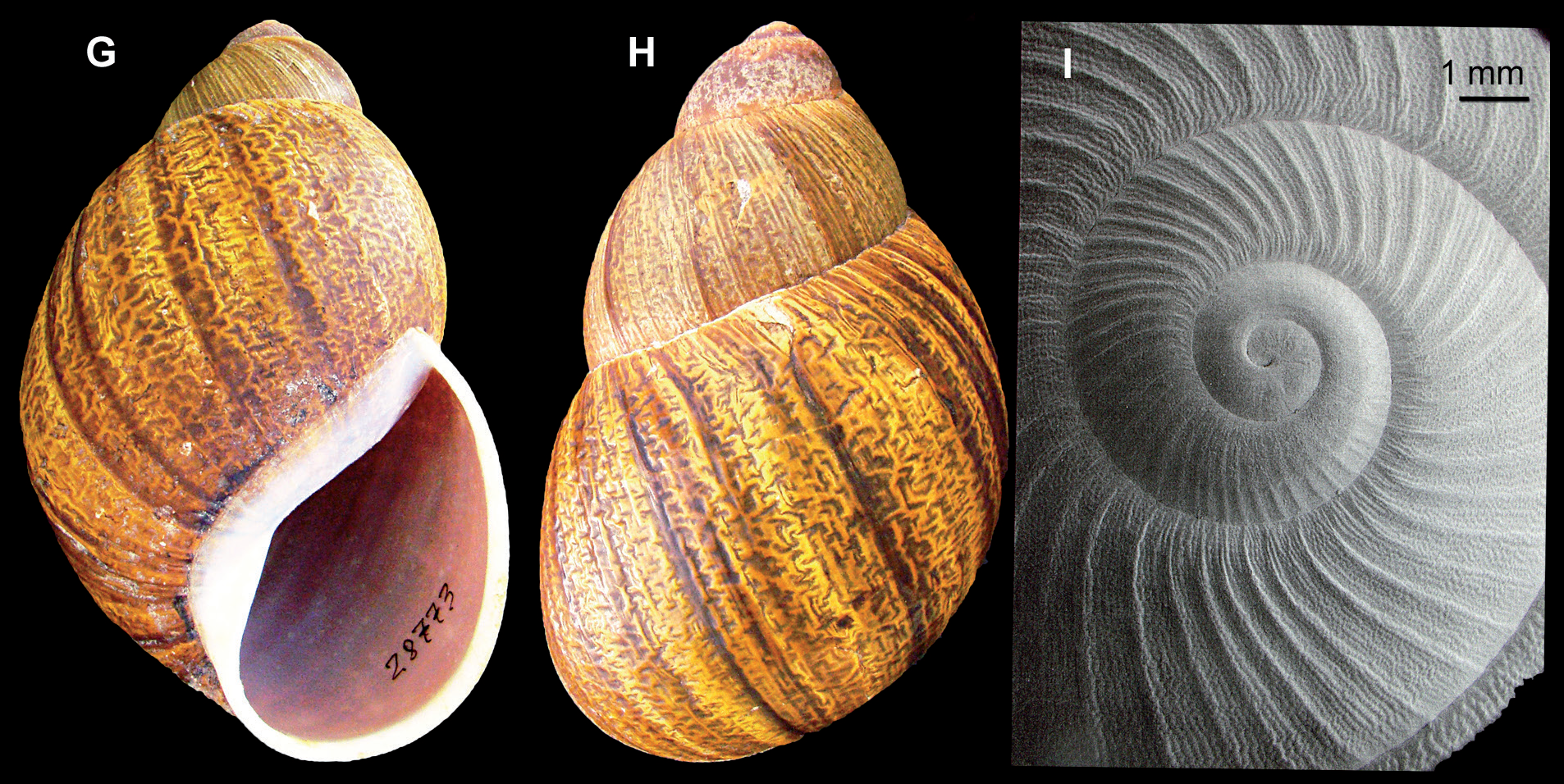
Apertural (G), abapertural (H) views of a shell of Megalobulimus dryades. Detail of the protoconch (I) viewed under SEM

Megalobulimus dryades is a large terrestrial snail, characterized by its relatively thick, heavy shell with up to 5.4 whorls. Adult individuals have shells that can reach up to nearly 120 mm (4.7 in) in length and about 75 mm (3.0 in) in width. The shell is ovate-conical in shape, slightly compressed dorsoventrally, with a short spire and a relatively wide body whorl. It has a reddish ocher coloration, with a yellowish‑white subsutural band that goes from the initial to the last whorl. Growth lines are visible, but the shell surface appears relatively smooth to the naked eye, except for characteristic pronounced rugosities that produce a malleated aspect on the teleoconch whorls. The shell's surface is covered by a thin, slightly glossy periostracum, an outer organic layer that protects the underlying shell. It is yellowish-brown with darker vertical bands, and is often darker colored in the shell's surface depressions formed by its marked rugosities. It is usually lost (peeled off) on the initial whorls in adult animals, but preserved on the last two teleoconch whorls.

A distinctive feature of M. dryades is its notably darker (compared to the remaining areas of its shell) reddish-dark brown colored protoconch, the oldest part of the shell formed during the earlier stages of the animal's development. It also features a distinct lighter subsutural band, a microsculpture visible under magnification composed of granules, and a larger sculpture of well-defined axial (vertical) riblets that branch apically near the suture. These attributes are important for differentiating M. dryades from similar species like Megalobulimus gummatus. The shell's aperture is large and oval, with a uniformly white peristome (outer edge). The columella, which is the central pillar around which the shell coils, is slightly twisted.

=== Soft parts ===
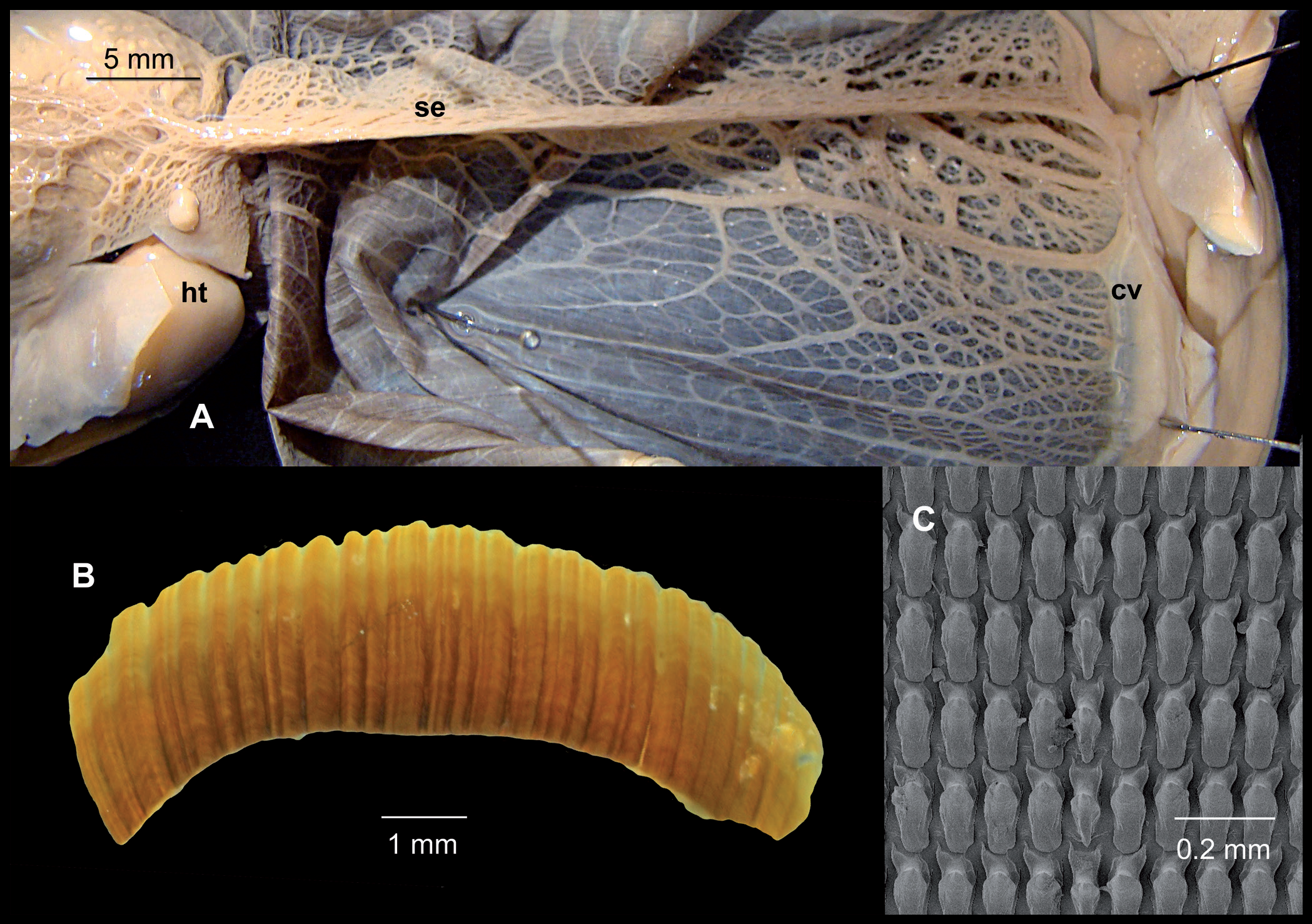
Internal morphology of Megalobulimus dryades, showcasing (A) the mantle cavity (or pulmonary cavity), (B) jaw, and (C) radula viewed under SEM. se = pulmonary septum; cv = collar vessel; ht = heart.

Megabolubimus dryades has a pale body coloration in life, ranging from dirty white to bluish-gray. On each side of its mouth, the species features a buccal flange typical of the genus Megalobulimus, each with seven small sensory papillae. The foot is broad and muscular, adapted for slow but steady crawling across substrates. Like other terrestrial snails, M. dryades secretes mucus, which reduces friction during movement and prevents desiccation.

M. dryades shows the typical traits of pulmonate gastropods, a large group of snails and slugs that breathe air using a modified mantle cavity functioning as a lung. Inside the mantle cavity (also called the pulmonary cavity), a network of vessels occupies a significant portion (about two-fifths) of the space. These vessels are arranged in a root-like pattern and are situated between the edge of the mantle and the internal septum. The heart is located in a region that takes up about one-third of the cavity dedicated to excretion and circulation. Muscle attachments and specialized blood vessels are also present in this area, supporting both respiratory and circulatory functions. The pneumostome (the external respiratory opening) is surrounded by folds that connect internally, helping to regulate airflow and in waste elimination. The kidney is triangular and takes up about half the volume of the pulmonary septum. It connects to the excretory system through a small opening called the nephrostome. Unlike many other mollusks, this species lacks a ureter. Instead, waste travels along a groove that runs parallel to the rectum and leads to the pneumostome.

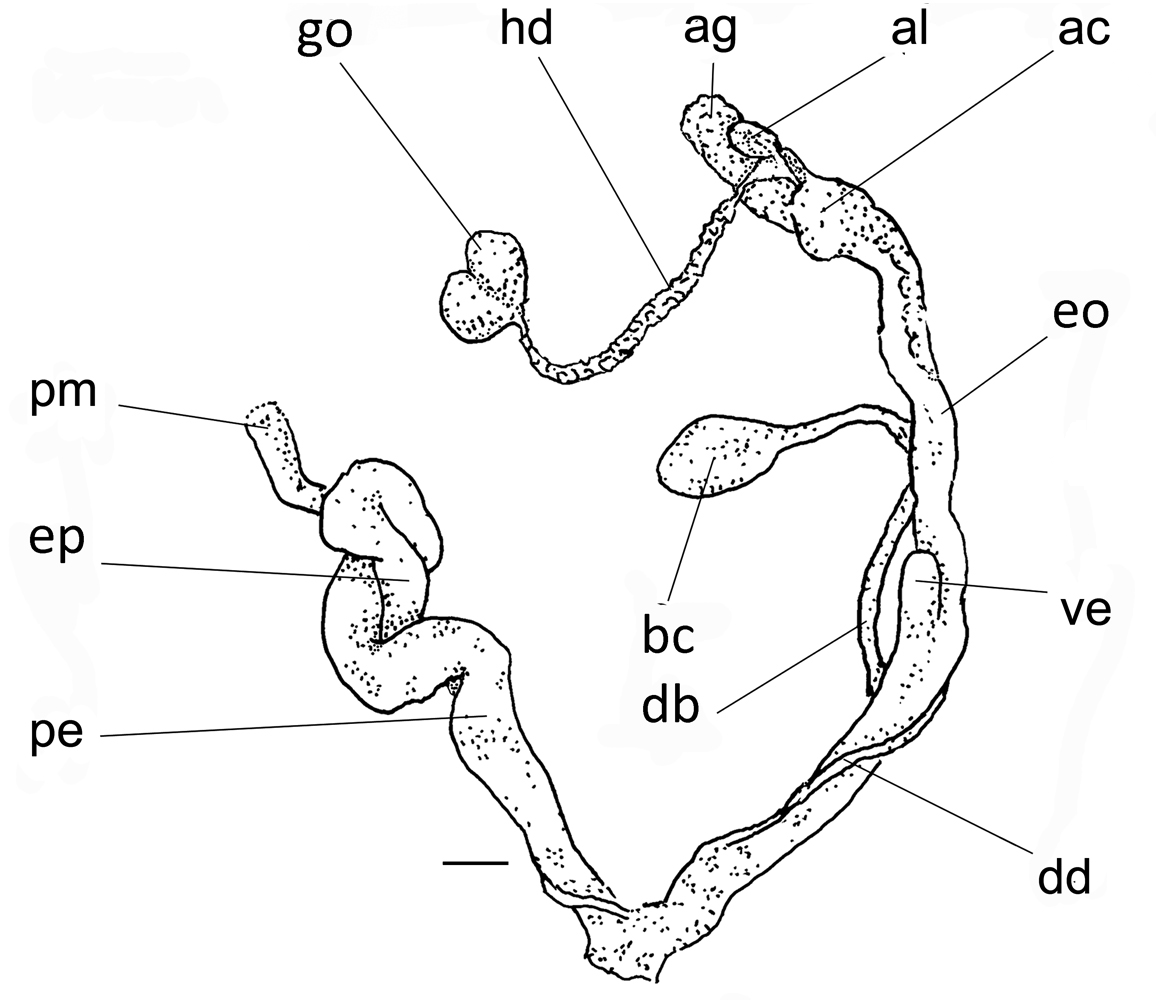
Schematic representation of the reproductive system of Megalobulimus dryades in dorsal view. ac = albumen chamber; ag = albumen gland; al = accessory glandular sac; bc = bursa copulatrix; db = bursa copulatrix duct; dd = vas deferens duct; eo = spermoviduct; ep = epiphallus; go = gonad; hd = hermaphroditic duct; pe = penis; pm = retractor muscle of the penis; ve = free oviduct appendix. Scale bar = 5 mm

The mouth and feeding structures are robust. The buccal mass, which houses the radula (a ribbon-like tongue with teeth), is strong and muscular. The jaw is arched, pigmented, and contains about 35 ridged columns, helping the animal scrape food. The radula has approximately 130 rows of single-cusped teeth. The central tooth is smaller and shaped like a drop, while the lateral teeth are longer and elliptical. The esophagus consists of three regions: an anterior chamber with smooth walls, a middle part with strong muscle folds, and a posterior region with more complex internal folding. These folds direct food into the stomach and digestive gland. The stomach itself is muscular and thick-walled, with internal folds that aid in digestion. The intestine begins with large internal ridges, including a prominent longitudinal fold that continues nearly to the rectum, where the folds become more complex.

The reproductive system is hermaphroditic, meaning each individual has both male and female reproductive organs. The female portion includes an albumen gland, uterus, and a bursa copulatrix (a sac involved in sperm storage). The male portion includes a long, cylindrical penis that is coiled by the vas deferens. Inside the penis are simple longitudinal folds and a small transverse fold near the tip. The epiphallus, a structure connecting the penis to the vas deferens, is short and broad and bears two slender, whip-like extensions called flagella.

== Life cycle ==
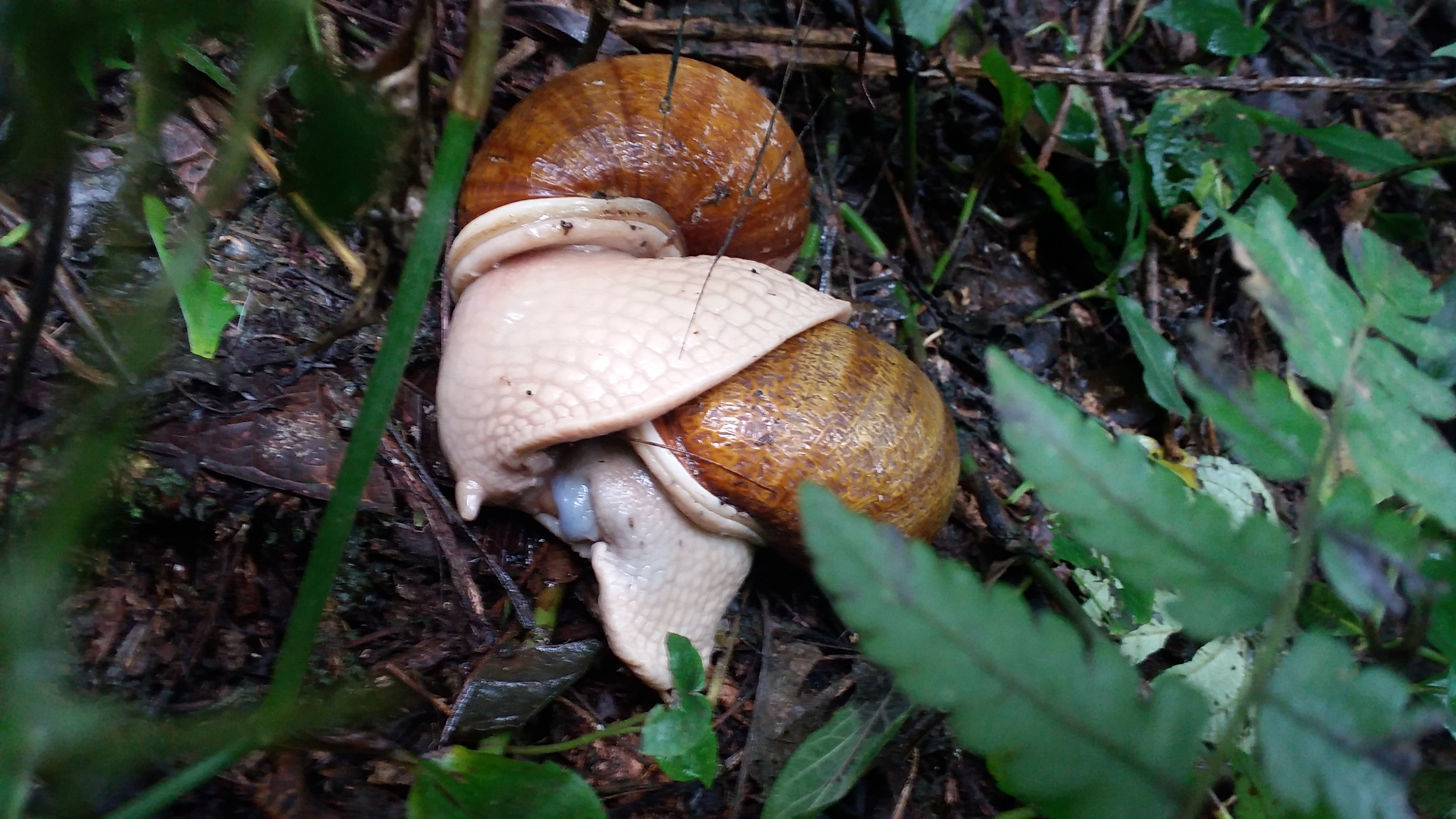
Two specimens of M. dryades mating in their natural habitat

The reproductive behavior of Megalobulimus dryades in laboratory conditions was studied in 2002, at the time under the name M. gummatus. Observations based on specimens from the Vale do Ribeira region in Brazil revealed that egg-laying occurs during two distinct periods: a longer season from April to May, and a shorter one between September and November. Females laid between 2 and 5 eggs per clutch. On average, about 52% of the eggs successfully hatched after an incubation period of approximately 60 days. The eggs were relatively large, measuring around 28.6 mm in length and 21.3 mm in width.

== Distribution ==
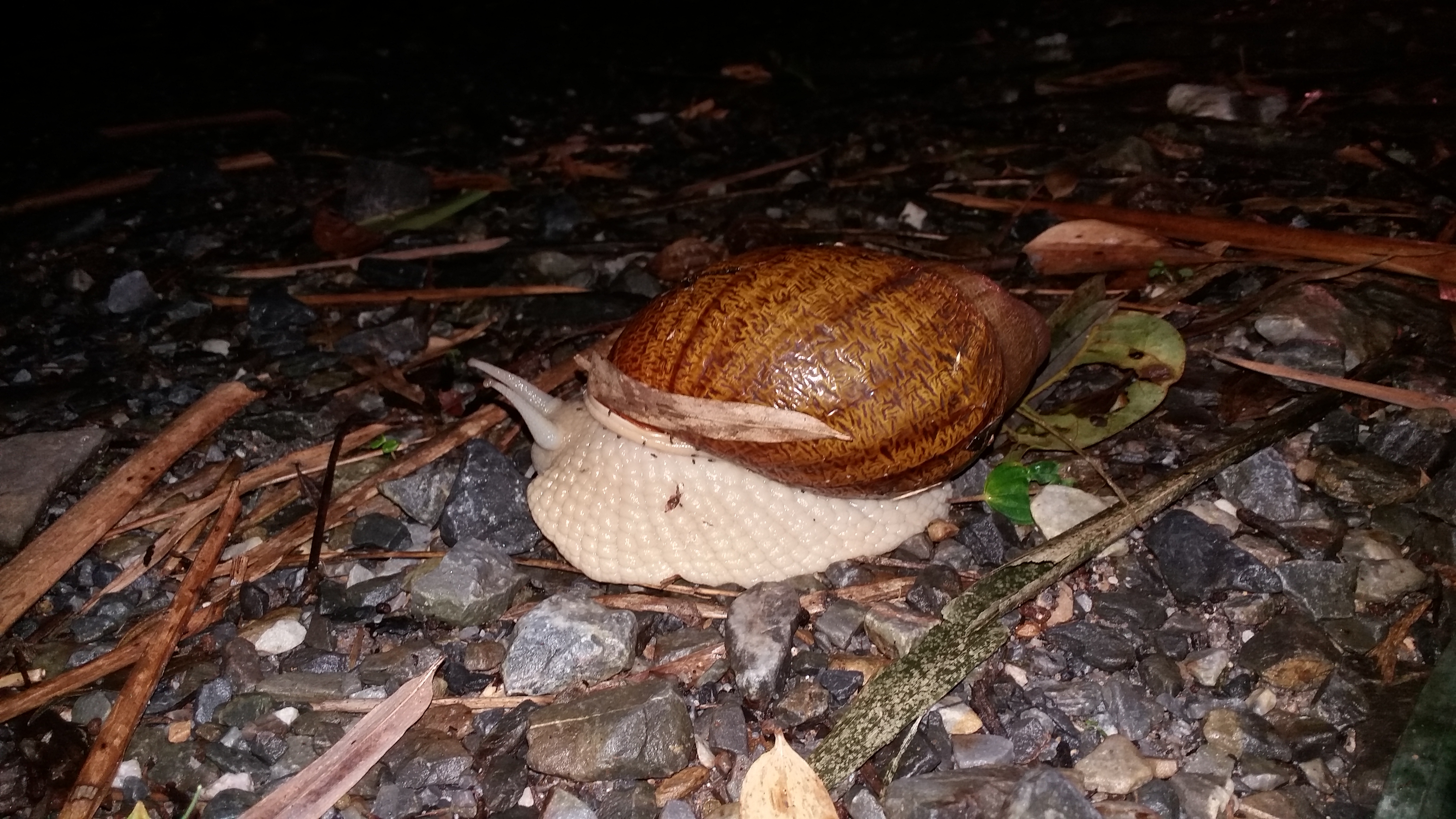
A specimen of M. dryades at the Alto Ribeira Tourist State Park

A species endemic to Brazil, Megalobulimus dryades primarily inhabits the middle and lower Ribeira de Iguape River basin in southern São Paulo state and northeastern Paraná state in the Atlantic Forest biome. It is known to occur in protected areas such as the Alto Ribeira Tourist State Park, and the Intervales State Park. It exhibits a high environmental tolerance, which may have facilitated its spread. Notably, its shells have been utilized in local handicrafts, potentially contributing to its distribution. There are also records of its presence in western Santa Catarina state, previously misidentified as M. gummatus.

== Conservation ==
Land snails may be especially vulnerable to environmental changes due to their limited ability to disperse and their reliance on very specific microhabitats. Despite this, Megalobulimus dryades has not yet been assessed by the International Union for Conservation of Nature (IUCN) and therefore does not currently have an official conservation status. This species is known only from the Atlantic Forest in southeastern Brazil, a global biodiversity hotspot that has experienced extensive deforestation and habitat fragmentation. Today, around 20–28% of its original forest cover remains, mostly in isolated patches. A 2023 survey by Brazil´s statistic agency IBGE revealed that the Atlantic Forest contains the largest number of endangered plant and animal species among Brazilian biomes. Ongoing deforestation for agriculture, urban and industrial development, fuelwood harvesting, poaching, and trading of species continue to erode what is left of the Atlantic Forest's biodiversity, putting many species at risk. Other species of the same genus that also occur in the Atlantic Forest, such as Megalobulimus lopesi and Megalobulimus proclivis, are already included on IUCN's list of threatened species. Given its restricted range, M. dryades may face similar threats. In the course of field studies, researchers documented a sharp decline in this species, initially misidentified as M. gummatus, at a site where it had once been common in Santa Catarina state. The decline was attributed mainly to the intensification of agricultural activity in the area, particularly the increased use of pesticides.
