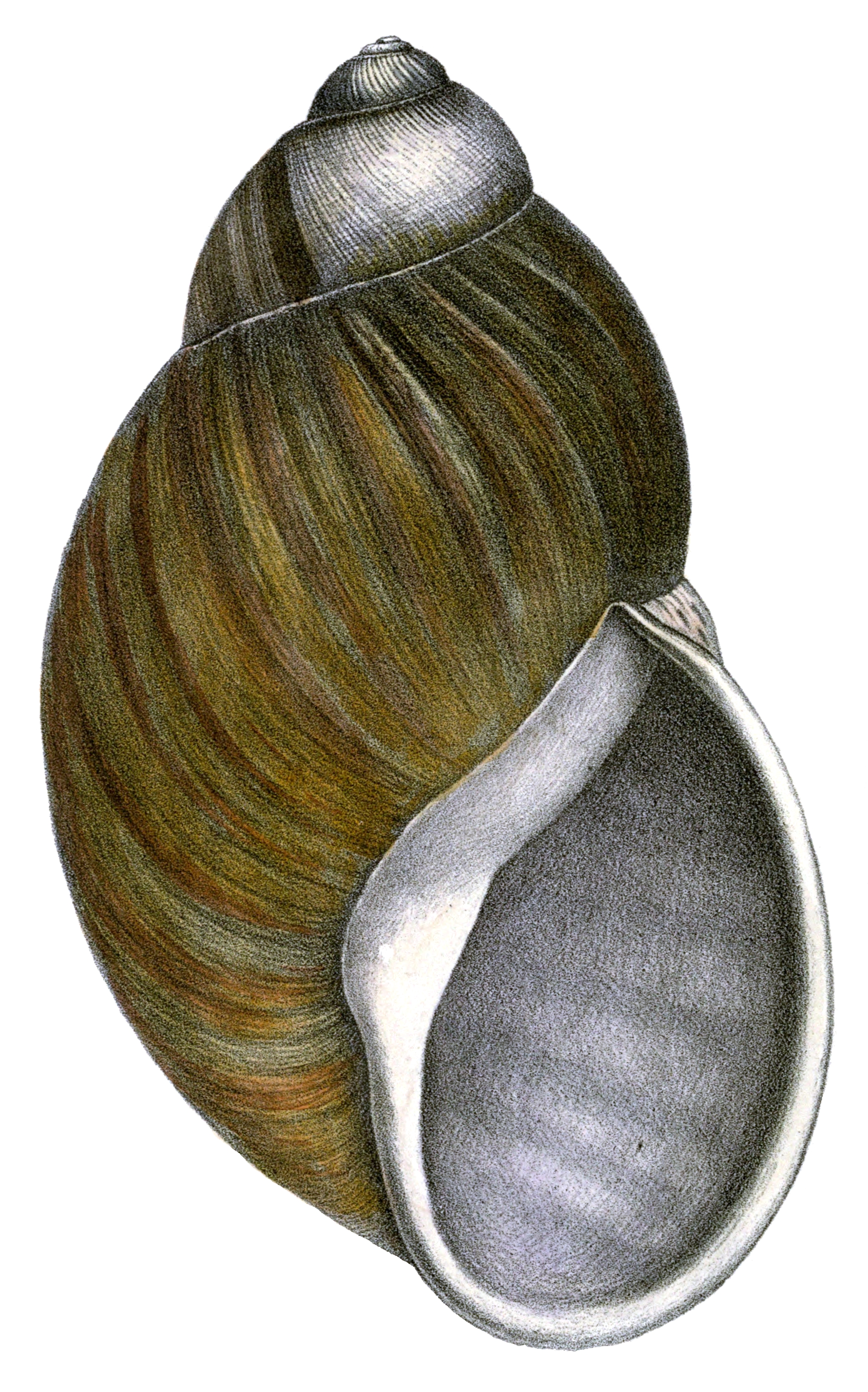
- Drawing of a shell of Megalobulimus popelairianus.

Scientific classification
- Domain: Eukaryota
- Kingdom: Animalia
- Phylum: Mollusca
- Class: Gastropoda
- Order: Stylommatophora
- Family: Strophocheilidae
- Genus: Megalobulimus
- Species: M. popelairianus

Binomial name
- Megalobulimus popelairianus (Nyst, 1845)

Synonyms
- Strophocheilus popelairianus

= Megalobulimus popelairianus =

Species of gastropod

Megalobulimus popelairianus, synonym Strophocheilus popelairianus, is a species of tropical air-breathing land snail, a terrestrial pulmonate gastropod mollusk in the family Strophocheilidae.

== Distribution ==
Megalobulimus popelairianus occurs in Ecuador, in Bolivia (doubtful) and in Brazil.

== Shell description ==
The shell is very large, solid, rimate, ovate-conic. The spire is subregularly tapering and the penultimate whorl is somewhat bulging. The last whorl is depressed on the back. The color of the shell is dark reddish-brown or rich chestnut with narrow darker streaks and a lighter margin below the suture. The earlier whorls are dull reddish. The apex is white. The surface is covered with a strong cuticle, shining. Nepionic shell is distinctly marked, with 4 whorls, sculptured with strong narrow radial riblets, which on fourth whorl become obsolete toward suture below. Succeeding whorls 2, having growth-wrinkles and a dense but rather irregular spiral granulation which fades out upon last whorl, which is more coarsely sculptured by lengthwise wrinkles and has generally more or less- coarse spiral malleation. Sutures are deep, the last decidedly more oblique.

The aperture is about half the shell's length, trapezoidal, white with a livid tint within. Outer lip is well reflexed, white (or light-brown edged), convexly curved. Columella is white, reflexed, and in the immediate vicinity of its insertion spreading upon the whorl and continued in a strong white callus across the parietal wall. Near the upper termination of parietal callus there are usually one or two low callous nodules.

The width of the adult shell varies from 85 to 98 mm, the height from 136 to 155 mm.

== Eggs ==
Megalobulimus popelairianus has the largest eggs of all land gastropods. The size of the egg is 51 × 35 mm (see also Stanlen 1917).
