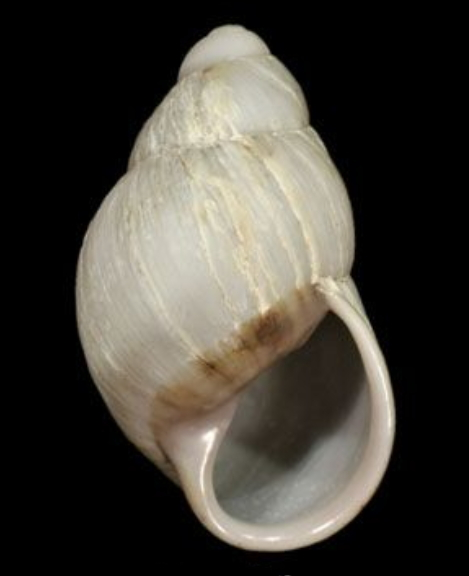
- Shell of Megalobulimus albus (specimen at the Natural History Museum Rotterdam)

Scientific classification
- Kingdom: Animalia
- Phylum: Mollusca
- Class: Gastropoda
- Order: Stylommatophora
- Family: Strophocheilidae
- Genus: Megalobulimus
- Species: M. albus

Binomial name
- Megalobulimus albus (Bland & W. G. Binney, 1872)

Synonyms
- Bulimus oblongus var. albolabiata E. A. Smith, 1895; Bulimus oblongus var. albus Bland & W. G. Binney, 1872 (basionym); Megalobulimus oblongus var. tobagoensis (Pilsbry, 1895); Strophocheilus (Megalobulimus) oblongus albus (Bland & W. G. Binney, 1872); Strophocheilus oblongus var. tobagoensis Pilsbry, 1895

= Megalobulimus albus =

Species of gastropod

Megalobulimus albus is a species of air-breathing land snail, a terrestrial gastropod mollusc in the family Strophocheilidae.

== Description ==
The shell is as large as Megalobulimus oblongus (O. F. Müller, 1774) but is pure white, with a rose-pink lip.

== Distribution ==
The species is endemic to Brazil.
