= Megalobulimus albescens =

Scientific classification
- Domain: Eukaryota
- Kingdom: Animalia
- Phylum: Mollusca
- Class: Gastropoda
- Order: Stylommatophora
- Family: Strophocheilidae
- Genus: Megalobulimus
- Species: M. albescens

Binomial name
- Megalobulimus albescens (Bequaert, 1948)

Synonyms
- Bulimus oblongus var. alba E. A. Smith, 1895 (preoccupied name); Strophocheilus (Megalobulimus) oblongus albescens Bequaert, 1948 (basionym)

Species of gastropod

Megalobulimus albescens is a species of air-breathing land snails, a terrestrial gastropod mollusc in the family Strophocheilidae.
