= Mirinaba jaussaudi =

Scientific classification
- Domain: Eukaryota
- Kingdom: Animalia
- Phylum: Mollusca
- Class: Gastropoda
- Order: Stylommatophora
- Family: Strophocheilidae
- Genus: Mirinaba
- Species: M. jaussaudi

Binomial name
- Mirinaba jaussaudi (Morretes, 1937)

Species of gastropod

Mirinaba jaussaudi is a species of air-breathing land snail, a terrestrial pulmonate gastropod mollusk in the family Strophocheilidae. This species is endemic to Brazil, found in states of Paraná and São Paulo.
