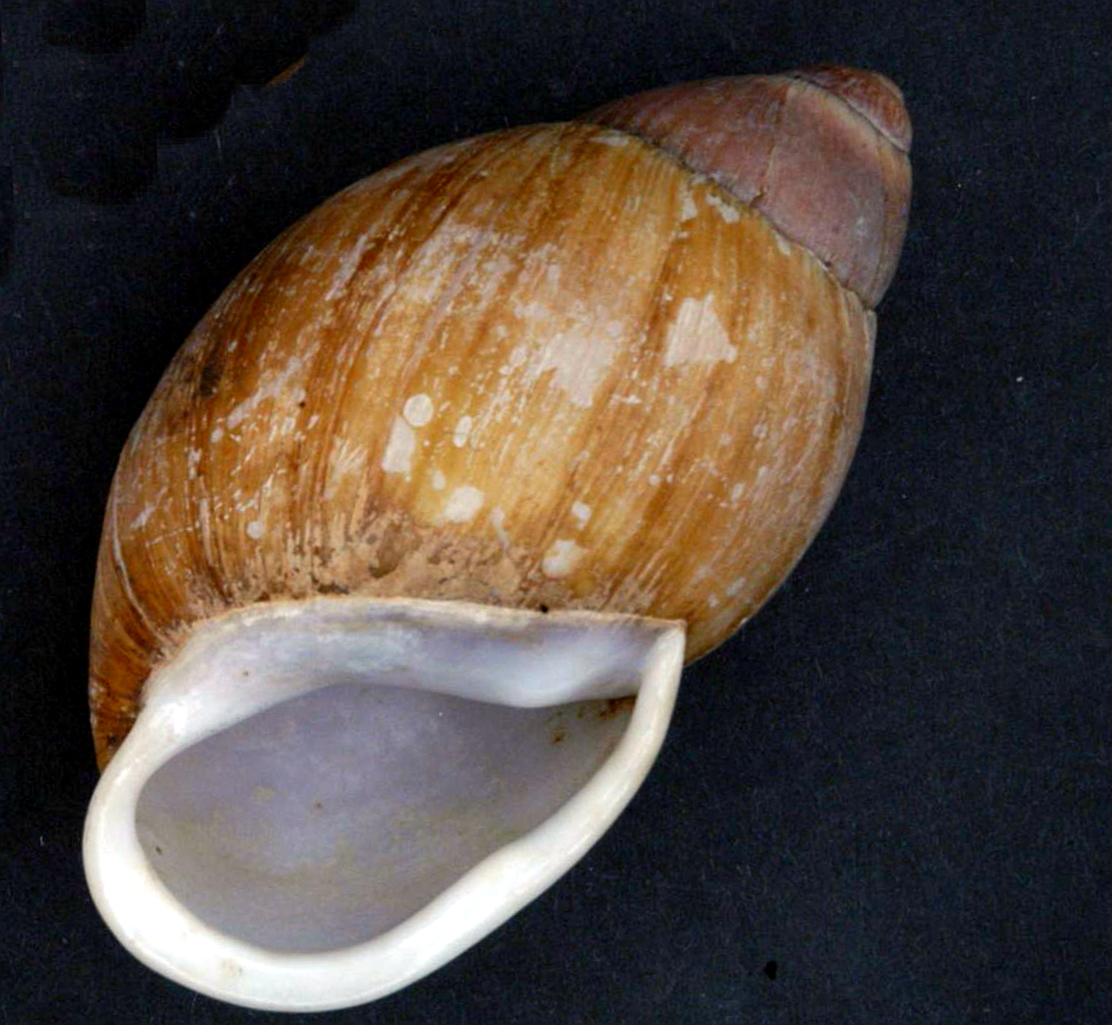
- Shell of Megalobulimus auritus (specimen at Naturalis Biodiversity Center)

Scientific classification
- Kingdom: Animalia
- Phylum: Mollusca
- Class: Gastropoda
- Order: Stylommatophora
- Family: Strophocheilidae
- Genus: Megalobulimus
- Species: M. auritus

Binomial name
- Megalobulimus auritus (G. B. Sowerby I, 1838)

Synonyms
- Bulimus auritus (G. B. Sowerby I, 1838); Bulinus auritus G. B. Sowerby I, 1838 (basionym)

= Megalobulimus auritus =

Species of gastropod

Megalobulimus auritus is a species of air-breathing land snail, a terrestrial gastropod mollusc in the family Strophocheilidae.
