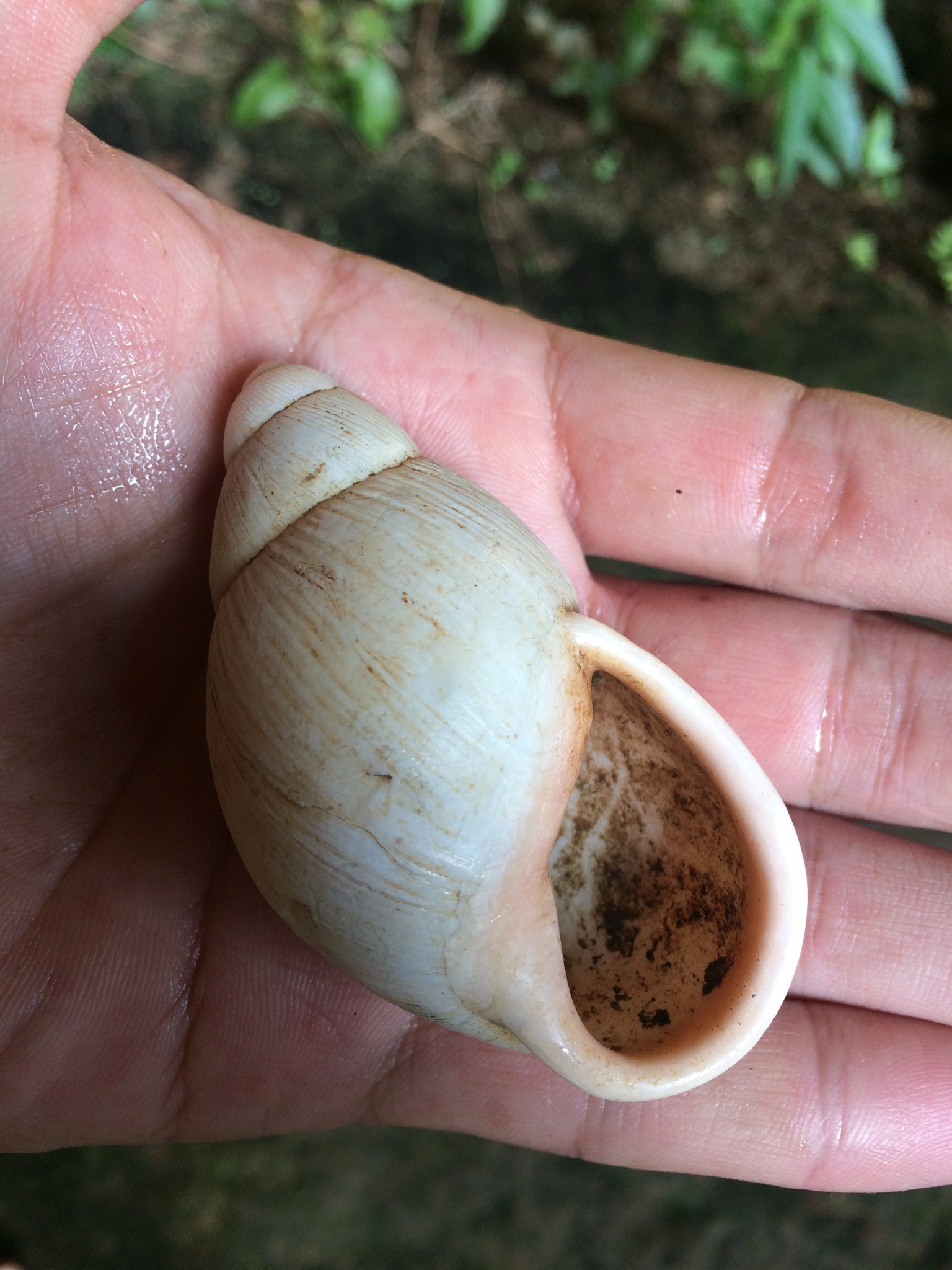
- An empty shell of Megalobulimus conicus

Scientific classification
- Domain: Eukaryota
- Kingdom: Animalia
- Phylum: Mollusca
- Class: Gastropoda
- Order: Stylommatophora
- Family: Strophocheilidae
- Genus: Megalobulimus
- Species: M. conicus

Binomial name
- Megalobulimus conicus (Bequaert, 1948)

Synonyms
- Strophocheilus (Megalobulimus) oblongus conicus Bequaert, 1948 (basionym)

= Megalobulimus conicus =

Species of gastropod

Megalobulimus conicus is a species of air-breathing land snails, a terrestrial gastropod mollusc in the family Strophocheilidae.
