= Megalobulimus cardosoi =

Conservation status
- Extinct (IUCN 2.3)

Scientific classification
- Kingdom: Animalia
- Phylum: Mollusca
- Class: Gastropoda
- Order: Stylommatophora
- Family: Strophocheilidae
- Genus: Megalobulimus
- Species: †M. cardosoi

Binomial name
- †Megalobulimus cardosoi (Morretes, 1952)

Synonyms
- Megalolulimus cardosoi Morretes, 1952 [orth. error]

Extinct species of gastropod

Megalobulimus cardosoi is an extinct species of air-breathing land snail, a terrestrial gastropod mollusk in the family Strophocheilidae. This species was endemic to Brazil. It was first described by Frederico Lange de Morretes
