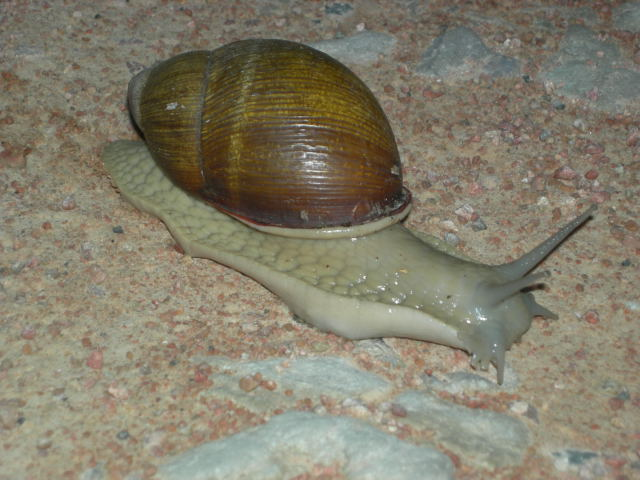

Conservation status
- Endangered (IUCN 2.3)

Scientific classification
- Kingdom: Animalia
- Phylum: Mollusca
- Class: Gastropoda
- Order: Stylommatophora
- Family: Strophocheilidae
- Genus: Megalobulimus
- Species: M. parafragilior

Binomial name
- Megalobulimus parafragilior Leme & Indrusiak, 1990

= Megalobulimus parafragilior =

Species of gastropod

Megalobulimus parafragilior is a species of air-breathing land snail, a terrestrial pulmonate gastropod mollusk in the family Strophocheilidae.

It is endemic to Brazil and has been found in São Paulo and Paraná states.
