= Megalobulimus abbreviatus =

Scientific classification
- Domain: Eukaryota
- Kingdom: Animalia
- Phylum: Mollusca
- Class: Gastropoda
- Order: Stylommatophora
- Family: Strophocheilidae
- Genus: Megalobulimus
- Species: M. abbreviatus

Binomial name
- Megalobulimus abbreviatus (Bequaert, 1948)

Synonyms
- Strophocheilus (Megalobulimus) granulosus abbreviatus Bequaert, 1948 (basionym)

Species of gastropod

Megalobulimus abbreviatus is a species of air-breathing land snail, a terrestrial gastropod mollusc in the family Strophocheilidae. The species is endemic to Brazil.
