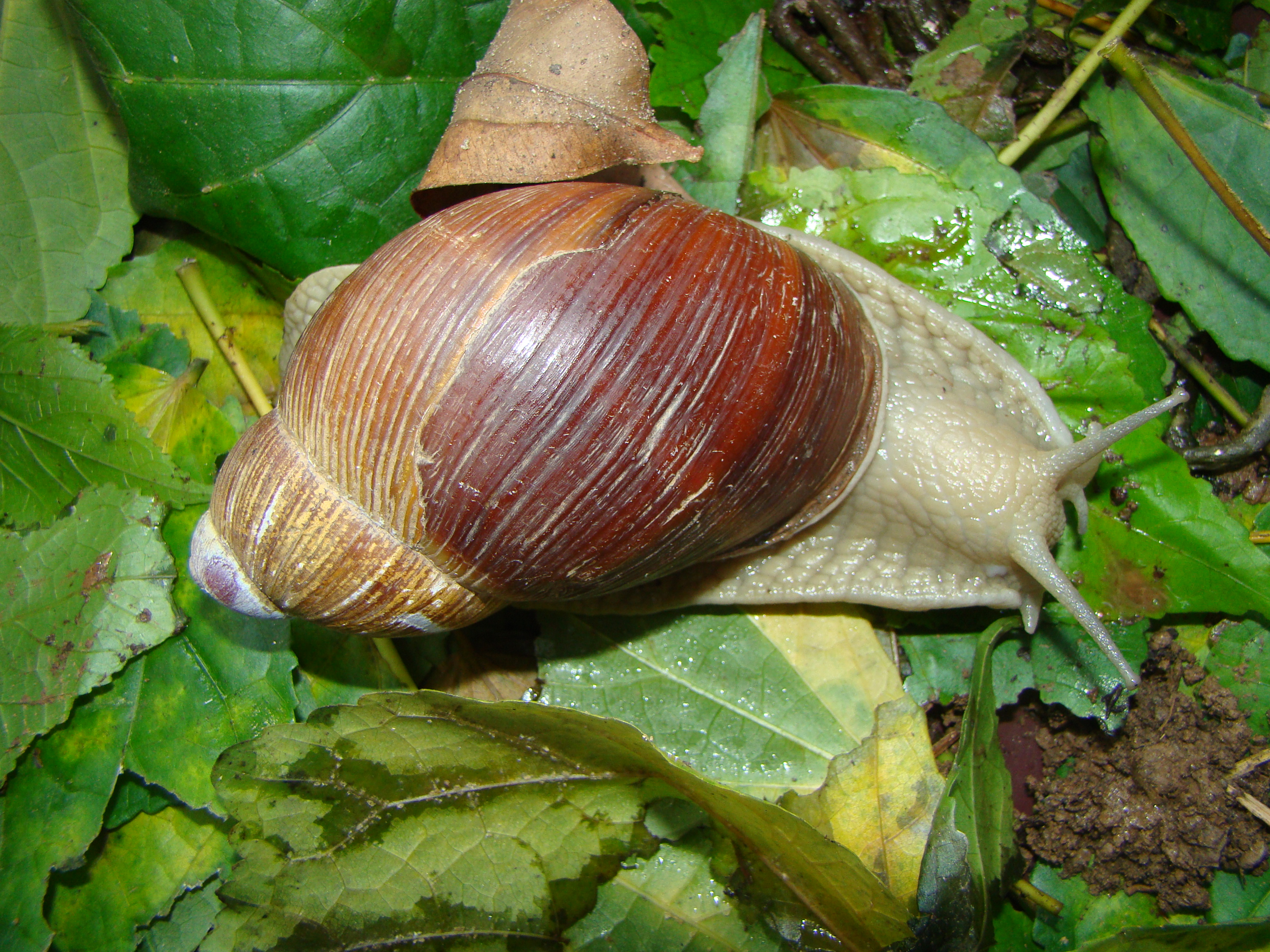
- A live specimen of M. paranaguensis from Brazil

Scientific classification
- Kingdom: Animalia
- Phylum: Mollusca
- Class: Gastropoda
- Order: Stylommatophora
- Family: Strophocheilidae
- Genus: Megalobulimus
- Species: M. paranaguensis

Binomial name
- Megalobulimus paranaguensis (Pilsbry & H. von Ihering, 1900)

Synonyms
- Strophocheilus paranaguensis Pilsbry & Ihering, 1900

= Megalobulimus paranaguensis =

Species of gastropod

Megalobulimus paranaguensis is a species of air-breathing land snail, a terrestrial gastropod mollusk in the family Strophocheilidae. They are native to South America and are known for being large and having a long lifespan. The survival rate of males is 96.7% and similarly high for other members of the species. Their eggs most often hatch in August and September and take around 51 days to hatch.
