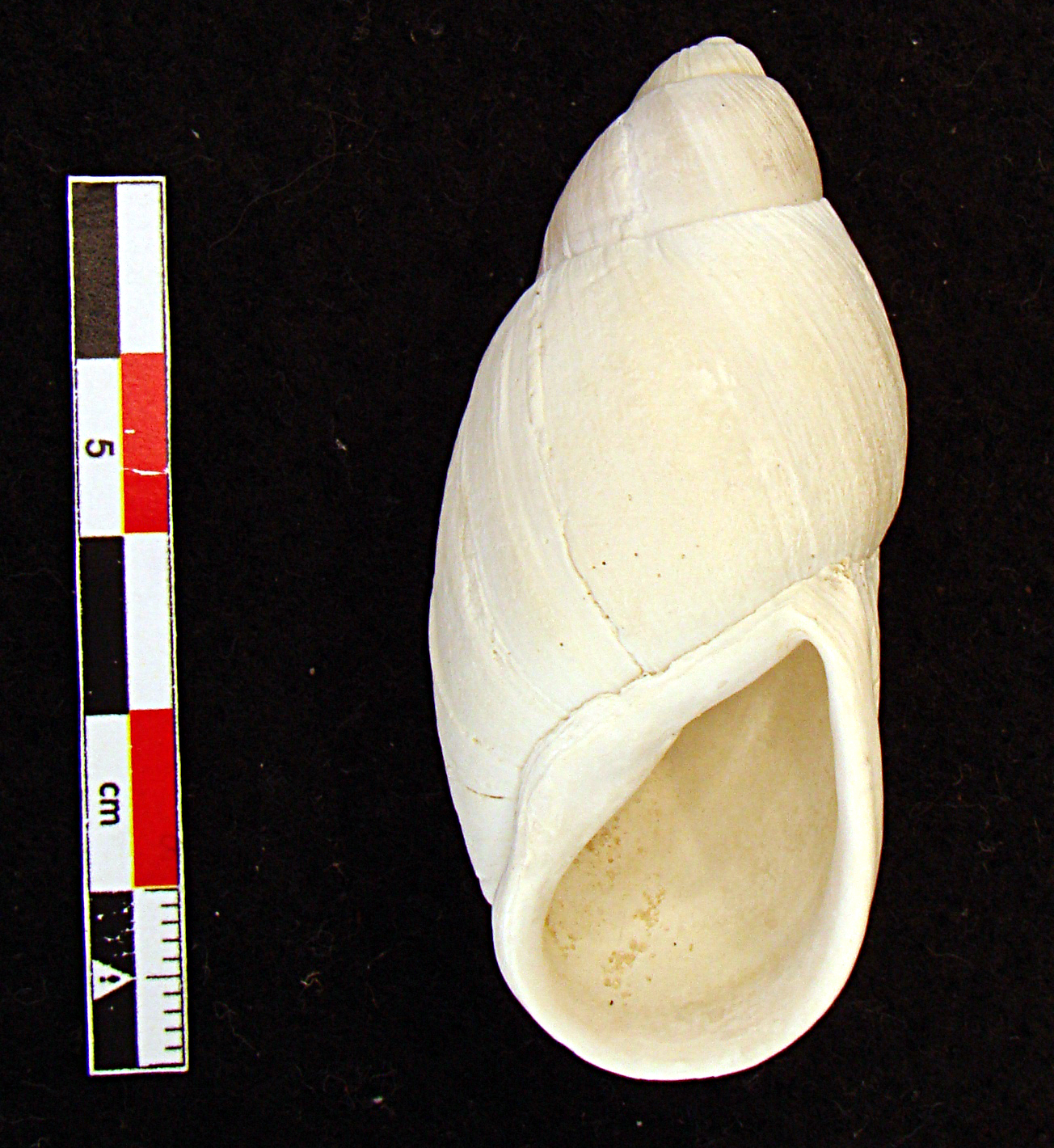
- Apertural view of an empty shell of Megalobulimus jaguarunensis

Scientific classification
- Kingdom: Animalia
- Phylum: Mollusca
- Class: Gastropoda
- Order: Stylommatophora
- Family: Strophocheilidae
- Genus: Megalobulimus
- Species: M. jaguarunensis

Binomial name
- Megalobulimus jaguarunensis Fontenelle, Cavallari & Simone, 2014

= Megalobulimus jaguarunensis =

Species of gastropod

Megalobulimus jaguarunensis is a species of air-breathing land snails, a terrestrial gastropod mollusc in the family Strophocheilidae. This species was described from archaeological shell mounds (Figueirinha II circa 3,549 - 3,822 years CAL BP and Jabuticabeira II circa 1,180 - 3,200 years CAL BP), known as sambaquis, located in the city of Jaguaruna, Santa Catarina, southern Brazil.
