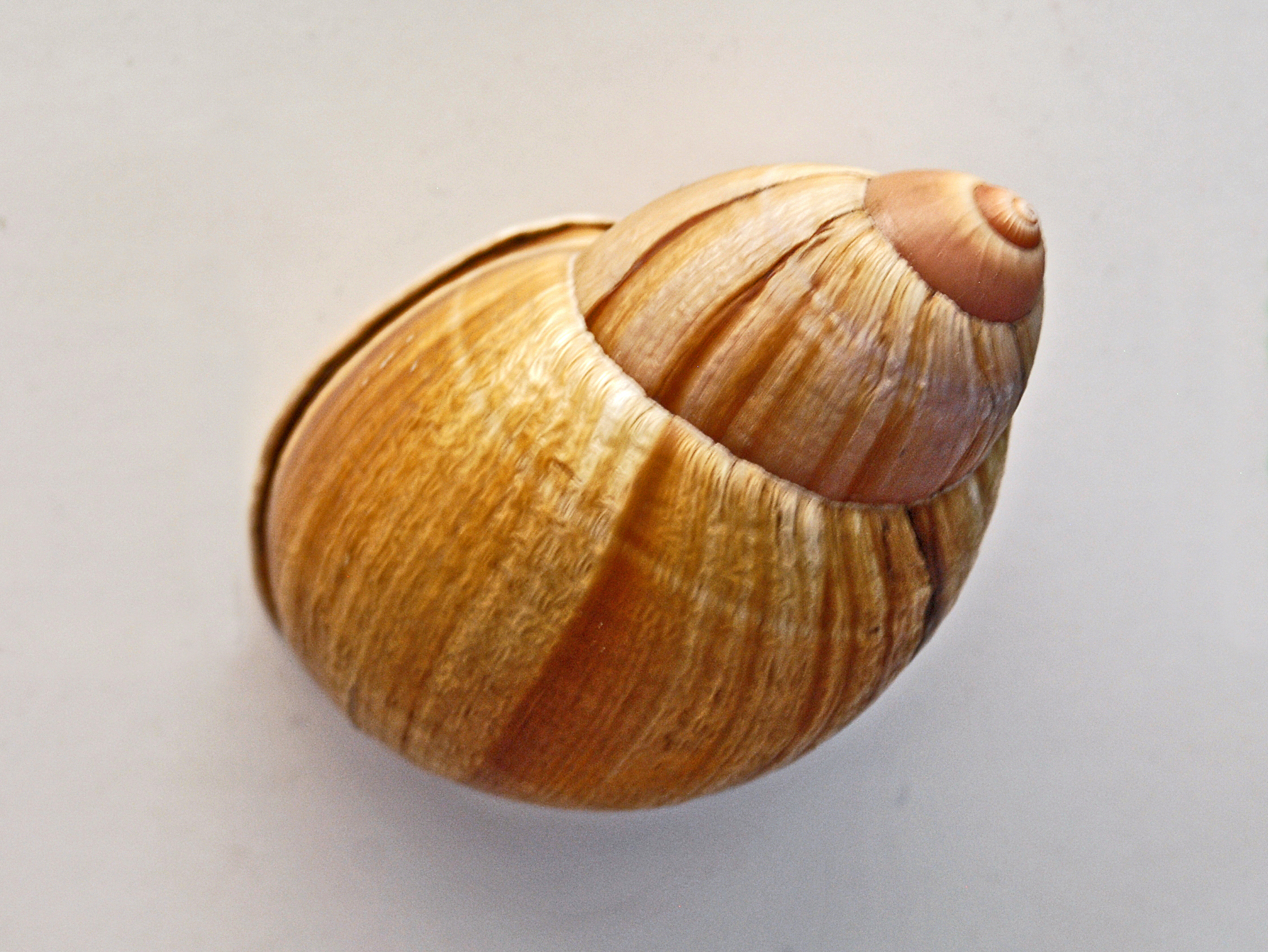
- Shell of Megalobulimus ovatus on display at the Museo Civico di Storia Naturale di Milano

Scientific classification
- Kingdom: Animalia
- Phylum: Mollusca
- Class: Gastropoda
- Order: Stylommatophora
- Family: Strophocheilidae
- Genus: Megalobulimus
- Species: M. ovatus

Binomial name
- Megalobulimus ovatus (O. F. Müller, 1774)

Synonyms
- Helix ovata O. F. Müller, 1774 (basionym); Bulimus ovatus (O. F. Müller, 1774); Strophocheilus ovatus (O. F. Müller, 1774); Helix ovipara Solander, 1786; Helix ovalis Gmelin, 1790

= Megalobulimus ovatus =

Species of gastropod

Megalobulimus ovatus is a species of air-breathing land snail, a terrestrial gastropod mollusk in the family Strophocheilidae. This species is endemic to Brazil.

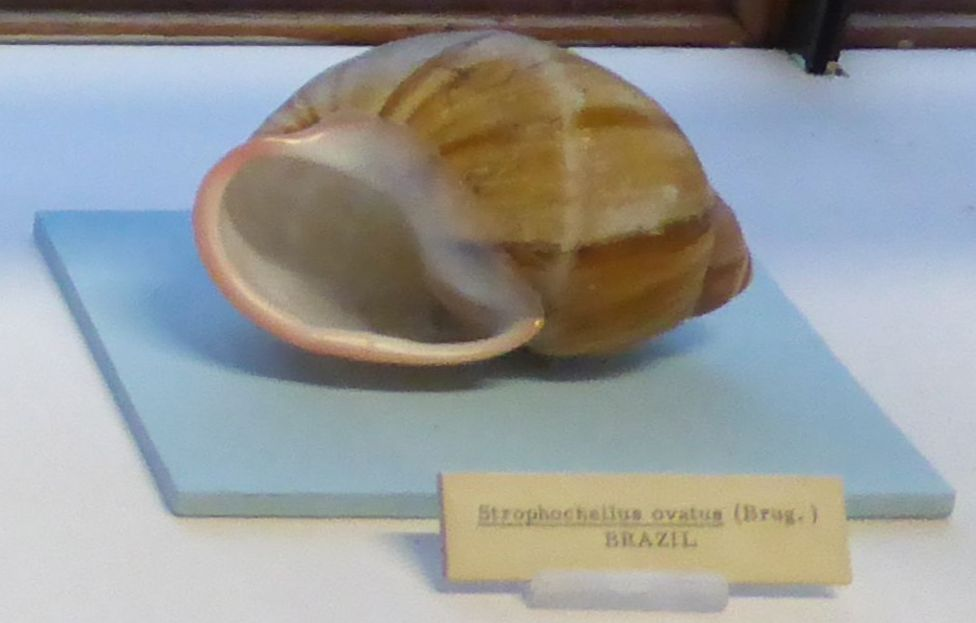
Megalobulimus ovatus (O. F. Müller, 1774) or Strophocheilus ovatus in National Museum of Ireland - Natural History
