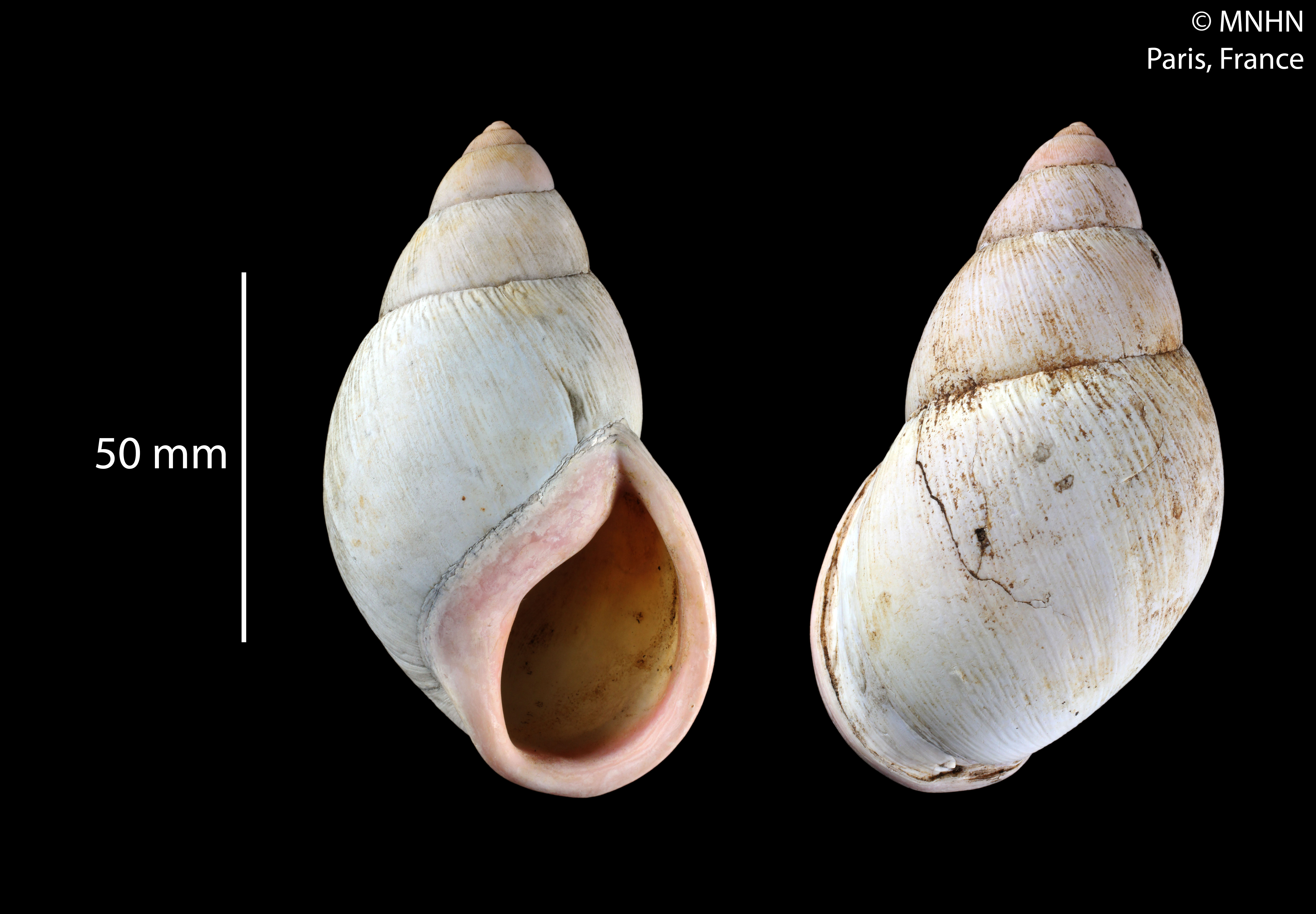
- Shell of Megalobulimus amandus (paratype at MNHN, Paris)

Scientific classification
- Kingdom: Animalia
- Phylum: Mollusca
- Class: Gastropoda
- Order: Stylommatophora
- Family: Strophocheilidae
- Genus: Megalobulimus
- Species: M. amandus

Binomial name
- Megalobulimus amandus Simone, 2012

= Megalobulimus amandus =

Species of gastropod

Megalobulimus amandus is a species of air-breathing land snail, a terrestrial gastropod mollusc in the family Strophocheilidae. The species is endemic to Brazil and was described based on shells collected in a Caatinga area in the state of Bahia.

== Taxonomy and nomenclature ==
The species was described in 2012 from shells deposited in the collection of the Museum of Zoology of the University of São Paulo. The specific name amandus derives from the Tupi language words amanda or amana, which mean "rain" or "related to rain," referring to the shape of the shell, resembling a drop of water.

According to the original species description, M. amandus appears to belong to the "Megalobulimus oblongus complex." This so‑called complex, as originally defined in 1998, encompasses species with a periostracum that peels off while the animal is still alive (desciduous), a reddish peristome, a shell surface with strong longitudinal sculpture, and a protoconch whose surface also features longitudinal sculpture composed of pronounced undulations and cords.

== Description ==
The shell of Megalobulimus amandus is oval-shaped, with thick walls and a pointed apex. It measures up to 80 mm in length and 50 mm in width, with up to 5½ whorls. The external coloration is uniformly pale beige in individuals without a preserved periostracum, with a light pink to red peristome. In those where the periostracum is still present, the shell surface is somewhat glossy and displays a mixture of light and dark brown longitudinal bands. The surface sculpture of the adult part of the shell features longitudinal growth striae, along with undulations near the aperture. The aperture is elliptical, and its width and height correspond to approximately half the overall width and height of the shell.

The protoconch has about 3 whorls: the first is smooth, while the remaining ones exhibit a surface sculpture composed of fine longitudinal striae extending from suture to suture.

The animal's anatomy is unknown, as none of the specimens examined at the time of the species' original description included preserved soft parts.

== Distribution ==
Megalobulimus amandus is known only from its type locality in the municipality of Santa Maria da Vitória, in the state of Bahia, Brazil, an area within the Caatinga biome.
