= Mirinaba curytibana =

Conservation status
- Critically Endangered (IUCN 2.3)

Scientific classification
- Domain: Eukaryota
- Kingdom: Animalia
- Phylum: Mollusca
- Class: Gastropoda
- Order: Stylommatophora
- Family: Strophocheilidae
- Genus: Mirinaba
- Species: M. curytibana

Binomial name
- Mirinaba curytibana (Morretes, 1952)

Species of gastropod

Mirinaba curytibana is a species of air-breathing land snail, a terrestrial pulmonate gastropod mollusk in the family Strophocheilidae. This species is endemic to Brazil.

== Distribution and habitat ==
Mirinaba curitybana is restricted to a small region in the state of Paraná, southern Brazil. It has only been documented in two specific areas located on Paraná’s First Plateau, within the municipalities of Curitiba and Campo Magro. The species has not been recorded in its natural environment since the late 1970s, suggesting a severely fragmented population. This lack of recent records, along with ongoing habitat deterioration, indicates that both the extent of its distribution and the condition of its environment are in decline. The most significant threat to its survival stems from the destruction of native vegetation and the spread of urban infrastructure. Due to these ongoing pressures, M. curitybana has been listed as Critically Endangered (CR) in the 2025 edition of Paraná’s Red List of Threatened Fauna.
