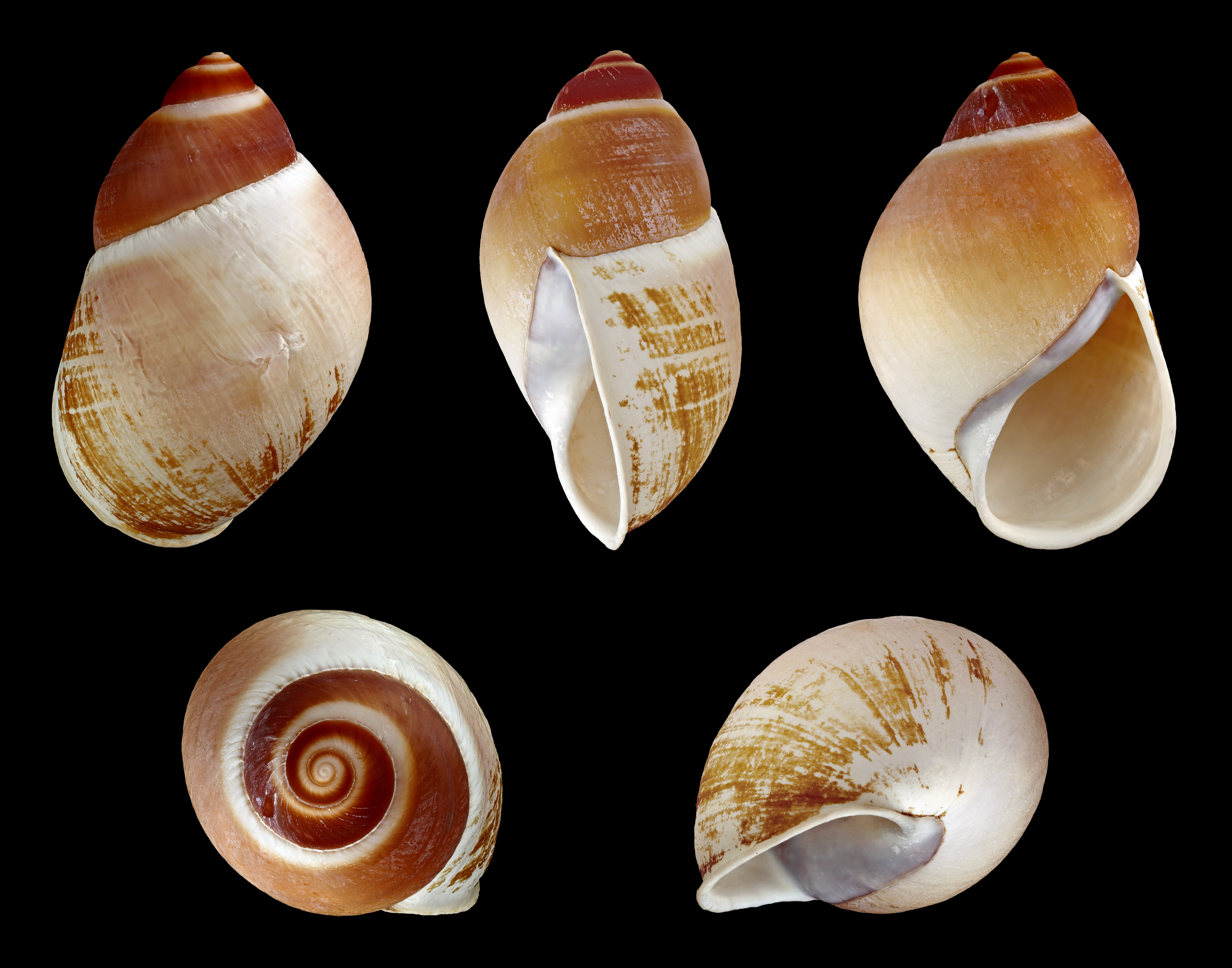
- Five views of a shell of M. gummatus
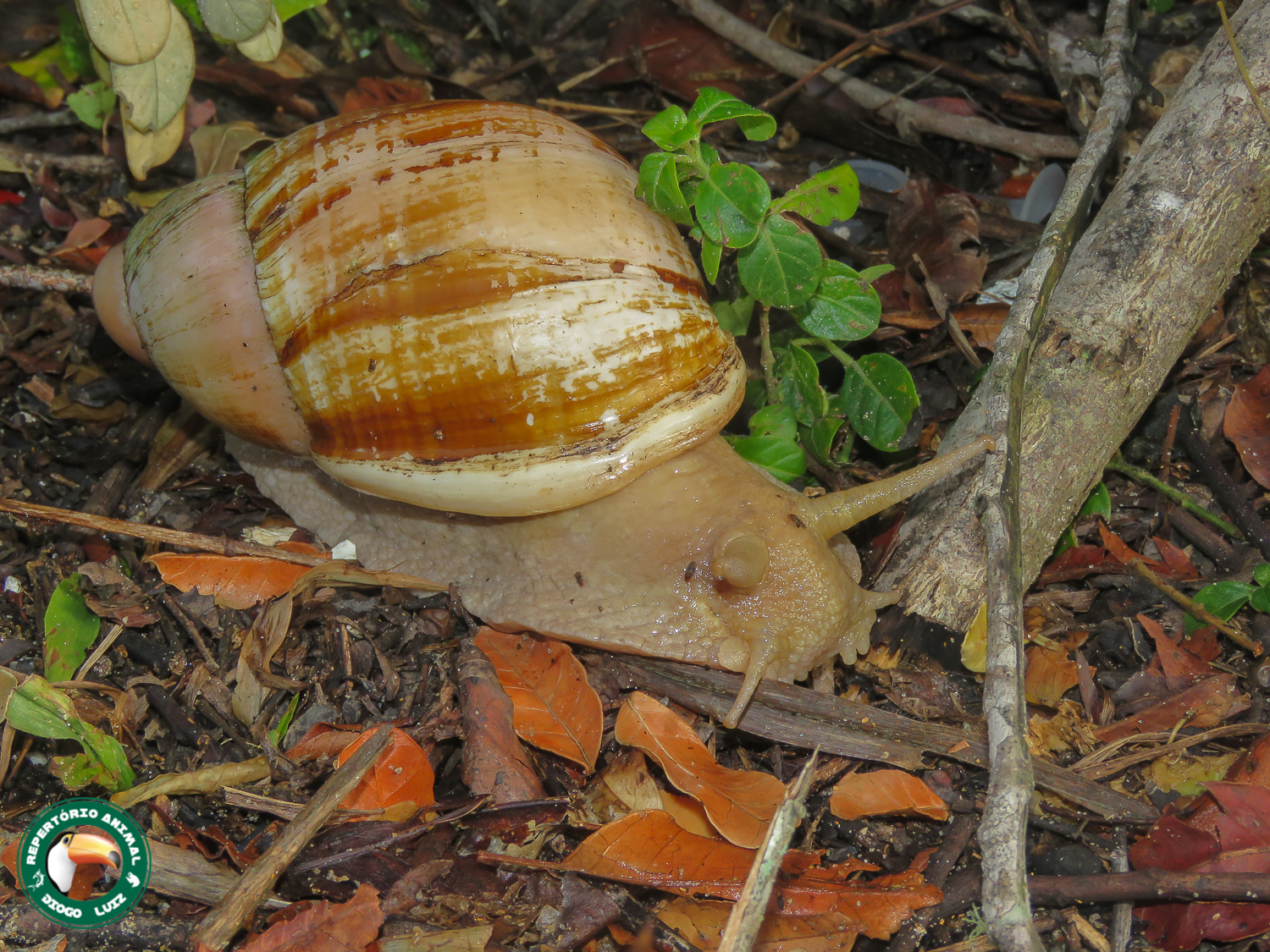
- A live specimen of M. gummatus from Rio de Janeiro

Scientific classification
- Domain: Eukaryota
- Kingdom: Animalia
- Phylum: Mollusca
- Class: Gastropoda
- Order: Stylommatophora
- Family: Strophocheilidae
- Genus: Megalobulimus
- Species: M. gummatus

Binomial name
- Megalobulimus gummatus (Hidalgo, 1870)

Synonyms
- Bulimus gummatus Hidalgo, 1870 (basionym); Strophocheilus (Megalobulimus) terrestris gummatus (Hidalgo, 1870) (superseded rank and combination)

= Megalobulimus gummatus =

Species of snail

Megalobulimus gummatus is a species of snail in the family Strophocheilidae found in Brazil.

It was originally described from Rio de Janeiro in 1870 as Builimus gummatus. Shells are usually around 110 mm long and 70 mm wide.
