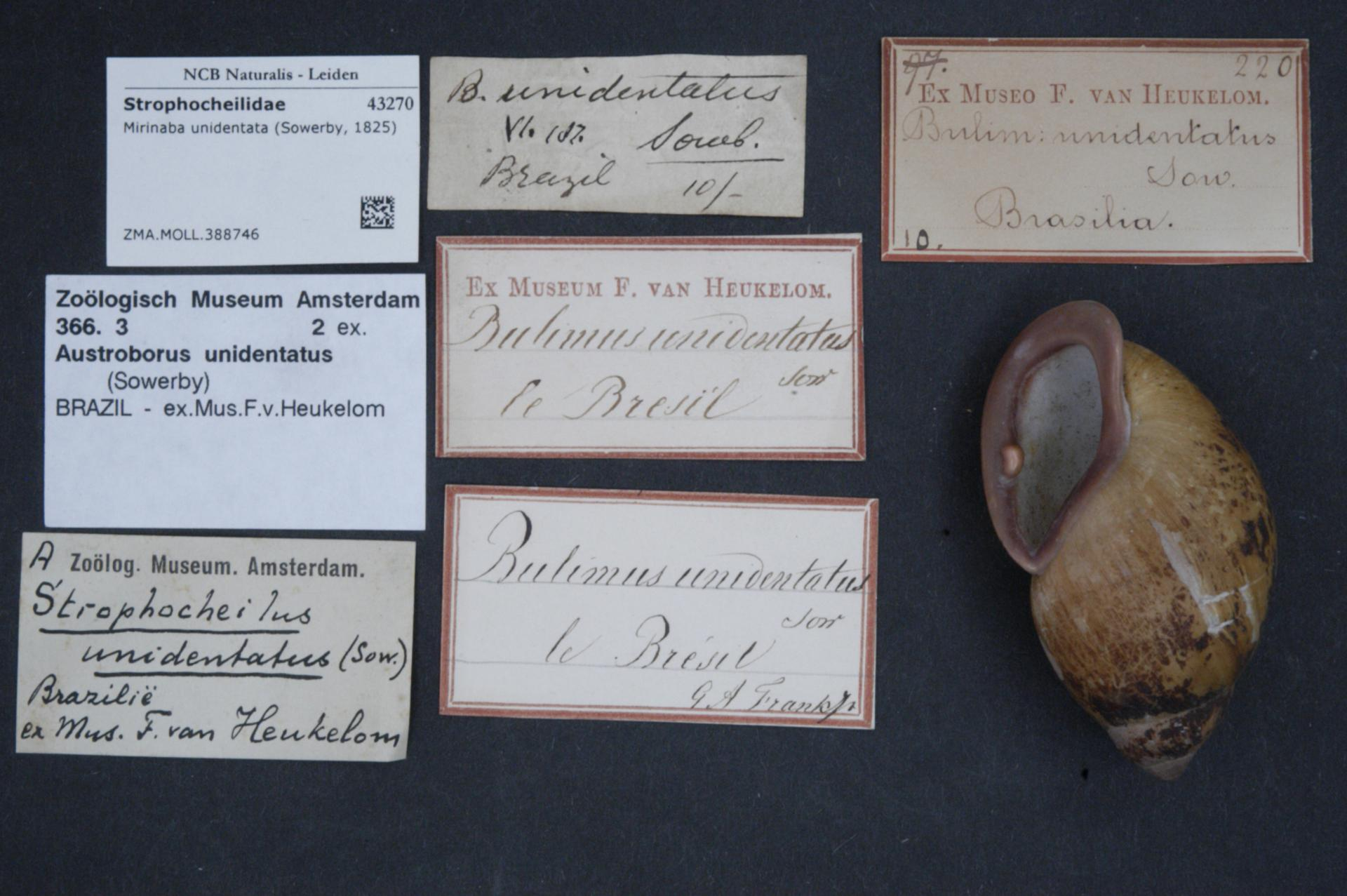
- Mirinaba unidentata

Scientific classification
- Kingdom: Animalia
- Phylum: Mollusca
- Class: Gastropoda
- Order: Stylommatophora
- Family: Strophocheilidae
- Genus: Mirinaba; Morretes, 1952

= Mirinaba =

Genus of gastropods

Mirinaba is a genus of air-breathing land snails, terrestrial pulmonate gastropod mollusks in the family Strophocheilidae.

== Species ==
Species within the genus Mirinaba include:

- Mirinaba antoniensis (Morretes, 1952)
- Mirinaba cadeadensis (Morretes, 1952)
- Mirinaba curytibana (Morretes, 1952)
- Mirinaba cuspidens (Morretes, 1952)
- Mirinaba erythrosoma (Pilsbry, 1895)
- Mirinaba fusoides (Bequaert, 1948)
- Mirinaba jaussaudi (Morretes, 1937)
- Mirinaba planidens (Michelin, 1831)
- Mirinaba porphyrostoma (Clench & Archer, 1930)
- Mirinaba unidentata (Sowerby, 1825)
