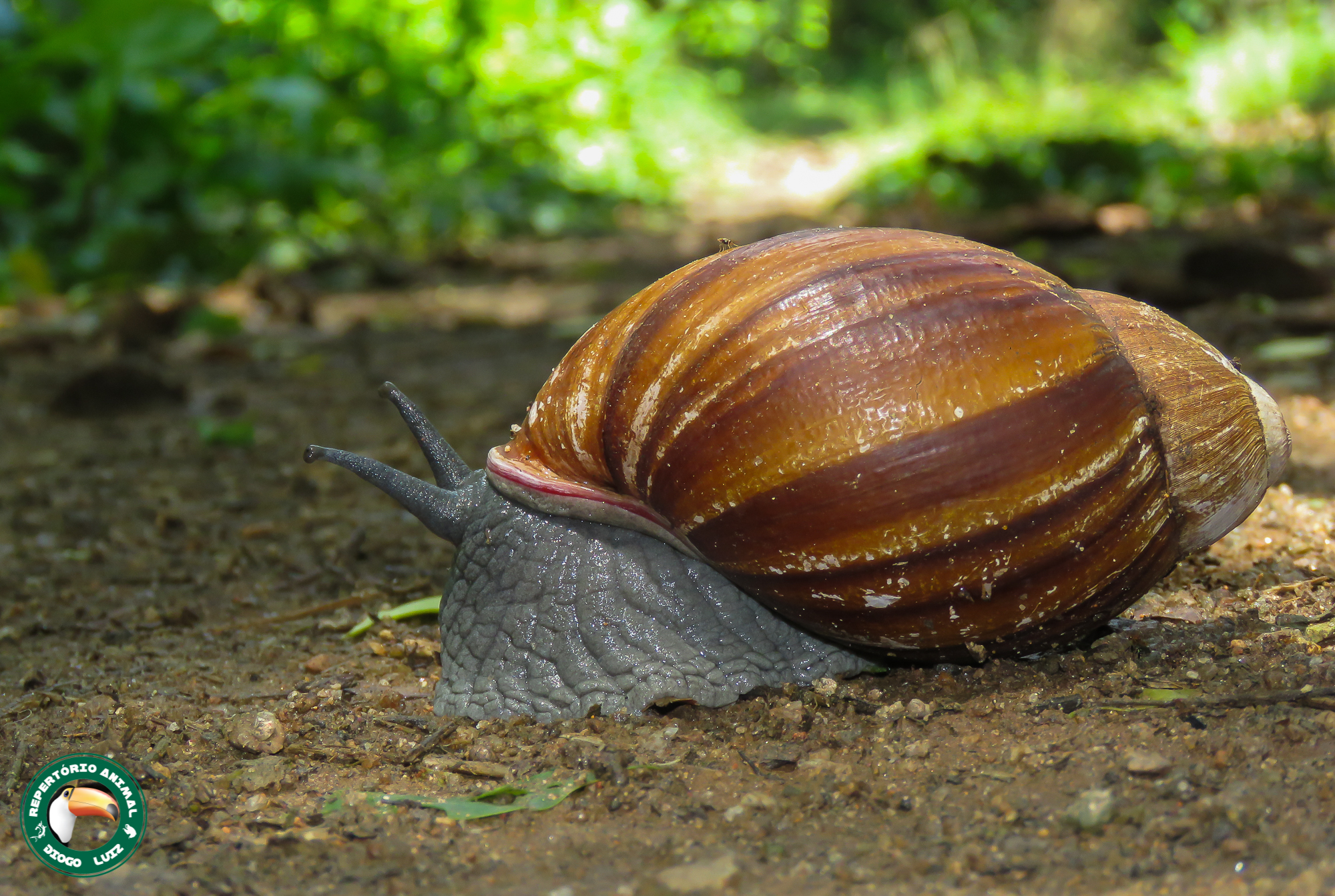

Conservation status
- Endangered (IUCN 2.3)

Scientific classification
- Kingdom: Animalia
- Phylum: Mollusca
- Class: Gastropoda
- Order: Stylommatophora
- Family: Strophocheilidae
- Genus: Megalobulimus
- Species: M. lopesi

Binomial name
- Megalobulimus lopesi (Lerne, 1989)

= Megalobulimus lopesi =

Species of gastropod

Megalobulimus lopesi is a species of air-breathing land snail, a terrestrial gastropod mollusk in the family Strophocheilidae. This species is endemic to Brazil.
