= Megalobulimus proclivis =

Conservation status
- Critically Endangered (IUCN 2.3)

Scientific classification
- Kingdom: Animalia
- Phylum: Mollusca
- Class: Gastropoda
- Order: Stylommatophora
- Family: Strophocheilidae
- Genus: Megalobulimus
- Species: M. proclivis

Binomial name
- Megalobulimus proclivis (Martens, 1888)

Species of gastropod

Megalobulimus proclivis is a species of tropical air-breathing land snail, a terrestrial pulmonate gastropod mollusk in the family Strophocheilidae. This species is endemic to Brazil.
