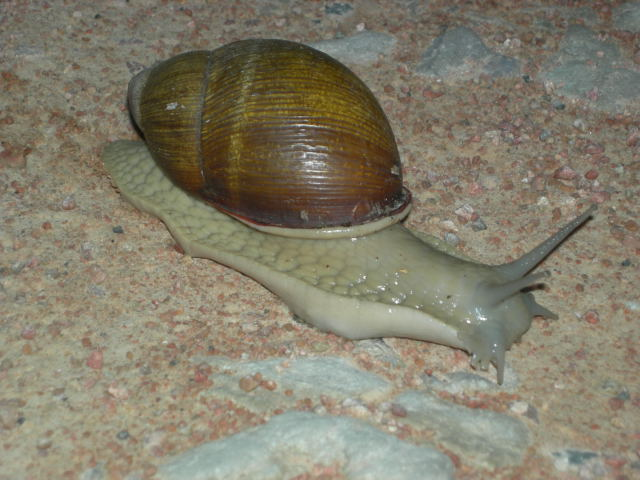
- Megalobulimus parafragilior

Scientific classification
- Kingdom: Animalia
- Phylum: Mollusca
- Class: Gastropoda
- Order: Stylommatophora
- Infraorder: Rhytidoidei
- Superfamily: Rhytidoidea
- Family: Strophocheilidae
- Genus: Megalobulimus; K. Miller, 1878

Type species
- Bulimus garciamoreni K. Miller, 1878

Synonyms
- Borus Albers, 1850; Bulimus (Megalobulimus) K. Miller, 1878 (original rank); Megalobulimus (Megalobulimus) K. Miller, 1878; Phaiopharus Morretes, 1955; Psiloicus Morretes, 1955; Strophocheilus (Borus) Albers, 1850; Strophocheilus (Megalobulimus) K. Miller, 1878

= Megalobulimus =

Genus of gastropods

Megalobulimus is a genus of air-breathing land snail, a terrestrial gastropod mollusk in the subfamily Megalobuliminae within the family Strophocheilidae (according to the taxonomy of the Gastropoda by Bouchet & Rocroi, 2005).

Megalobulimus is the type genus of the subfamily Megalobuliminae.

== Description ==
(Original description) The jaw and radula of the following species differ so considerably from those of the typical Borus oblongus Müll. that I considered establishing a new subgenus, Megalobulimus, into which the giants of the Bulimidae would be classified. These could be characterized by the absence of strong transverse ribs on the jaw, a finely granular shell, reddish-brown upper whorls, a white band accompanying the suture, and a white aperture.

== Distribution ==
These species are primarily found throughout South America—especially in the Andean Amazon and eastern Brazil. Some species are widespread across the continent, while others are locally restricted.

== Habitat ==
Habitats include humid tropical forests, grasslands, and often forest litter and soil. Some species have an affinity for limestone soils and may be found in or near caves.

== Species ==
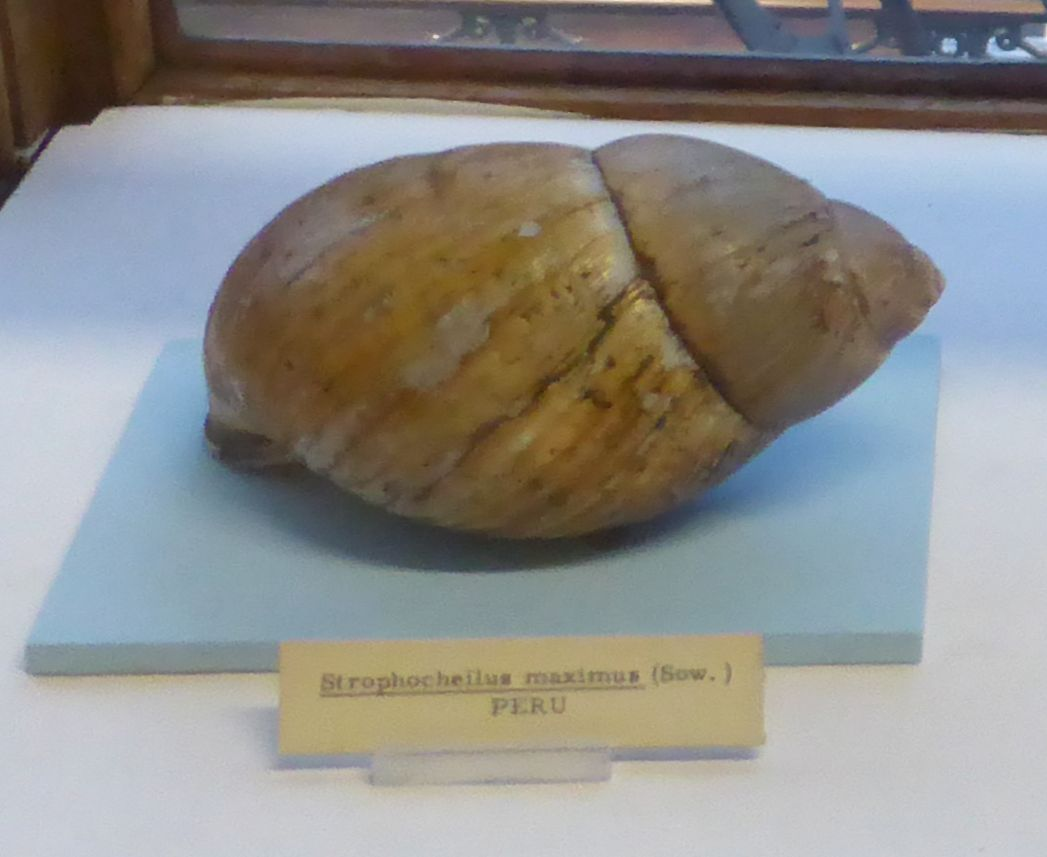
Megalobulimus maximus, also Strophocheilus maximus (Sowerby) in National Museum of Ireland - Natural History

Species within the genus Megalobulimus include:

- Megalobulimus abbreviatus (Bequaert, 1948)
- Megalobulimus albescens (Bequaert, 1948)
- Megalobulimus albus (Bland & Binney, 1872)
- Megalobulimus amandus Simone, 2012
- Megalobulimus auritus (Sowerby, 1838)
- Megalobulimus bertae Lange-de-Morretes, 1952
- Megalobulimus bronni (Pfeiffer, 1847)
- Megalobulimus capillaceus (Pfeiffer, 1855)
- Megalobulimus cardosoi (Lange-de-Morretes, 1952)
- Megalobulimus carrikeri (Pilsbry, 1930)
- Megalobulimus chionostoma (Mörch, 1852)
- Megalobulimus conicus (Bequaert, 1948)
- Megalobulimus crassus (Albers, 1850)
- Megalobulimus diluvianus Fontenelle & Salvador, 2023
- Megalobulimus dryades Fontenelle, Simone & Cavallari, 2021
- Megalobulimus elongatus (Bequaert, 1948)
- Megalobulimus elsae Falconeri, 1994
- Megalobulimus felipponei Ihering, 1928
- Megalobulimus florezi Borda & Ramírez, 2013
- Megalobulimus foreli (Bequaert, 1948)
- Megalobulimus formicacorsii (Barattini & Ledón, 1949)
- Megalobulimus fragilior (Ihering, 1901)
- Megalobulimus garbeanus (Leme, 1964)
- Megalobulimus garciamoreni (K. Miller, 1878)
- Megalobulimus globosus (Martens, 1876)
- Megalobulimus granulosus (Rang, 1831)
- Megalobulimus gummatus (Hidalgo, 1870)
- Megalobulimus haemastomus (Scopoli, 1786)
- †Megalobulimus hauthali (Ihering, 1904)
- Megalobulimus hector (Pfeiffer, 1857)
- Megalobulimus helicoides Simone, 2018
- Megalobulimus huascari (Tschudi, 1852)
- Megalobulimus inambarisensis Borda & Ramírez, 2016
- Megalobulimus indigens (Fulton, 1914)
- Megalobulimus intercedens (E. von Martens, 1876)
- Megalobulimus intertextus (Pilsbry, 1895)
- Megalobulimus jaguarunensis Fontenelle, Cavallari & Simone, 2014
- Megalobulimus klappenbachi (Leme, 1964)
- Megalobulimus lacunosus (d'Orbigny, 1835)
- Megalobulimus leonardosi (Lange-de-Morretes, 1952)
- Megalobulimus leucostoma (G. B. Sowerby I, 1835)
- Megalobulimus lichtensteini Albers, 1854
- Megalobulimus lopesi Leme, 1989
- Megalobulimus martensianus (Pilsbry, 1902)
- Megalobulimus mauricius Falconeri, 1995
- Megalobulimus maximus (Sowerby, 1825)
- Megalobulimus mogianensis Simone & Leme, 1998
- Megalobulimus nodai Lange-de-Morretes, 1952
- Megalobulimus oblongus (Müller, 1774)
- Megalobulimus oliveirai (Bequaert, 1948)
- Megalobulimus oosomus (Pilsbry, 1895)
- Megalobulimus ovatus (Müller, 1774)
- Megalobulimus parafragilior Leme & Indrusiak, 1990
- Megalobulimus paranaguensis (Pilsbry & Ihering, 1900)
- Megalobulimus pergranulatus (Pilsbry, 1901)
- Megalobulimus pintoi Lange-de-Morretes, 1952
- Megalobulimus popelairianus (Nyst, 1845)
- Megalobulimus proclivis (Martens, 1888)
- Megalobulimus pygmaeus (Bequaert, 1948)
- Megalobulimus riopretensis Simone & Leme, 1998
- Megalobulimus rolandianus Lange-de-Morretes, 1952
- Megalobulimus sanctaepauli (Ihering & Pilsbry, 1900)
- Megalobulimus santacruzii (d'Orbigny, 1835)
- Megalobulimus separabilis (Fulton, 1903)
- Megalobulimus tayacajus Borda & Ramírez, 2016
- Megalobulimus terrestris (Spix, 1827)
- Megalobulimus valenciennesii (Pfeiffer, 1842)
- Megalobulimus versatilis (Fulton, 1905)
- Megalobulimus vestitus (Pilsbry, 1926)
- † Megalobulimus wichmanni Miquel & Manceñido, 1999
- Megalobulimus wohlersi Lange-de-Morretes, 1952
- Megalobulimus yporanganus (Ihering & Pilsbry, 1901)

== Human use ==
Shells of terrestrial snails, mainly of the genus Megalobulimus, are found in fluvial shellmound (called sambaqui in Brazil) on the Capelinha archaeological site from Paleo-Indian culture of early Holocene.

The shell of Megalobulimus sp. (local name: "churito") is used in the traditional ethnomedicine of Northwest Argentina when babies are hyperactive and cannot sleep well, then it is advised to put a shell under a pillow.
