= Strophocheilus =

Scientific classification
- Domain: Eukaryota
- Kingdom: Animalia
- Phylum: Mollusca
- Class: Gastropoda
- Order: Stylommatophora
- Family: Strophocheilidae
- Genus: Strophocheilus; Spix, 1827

Genus of land snails

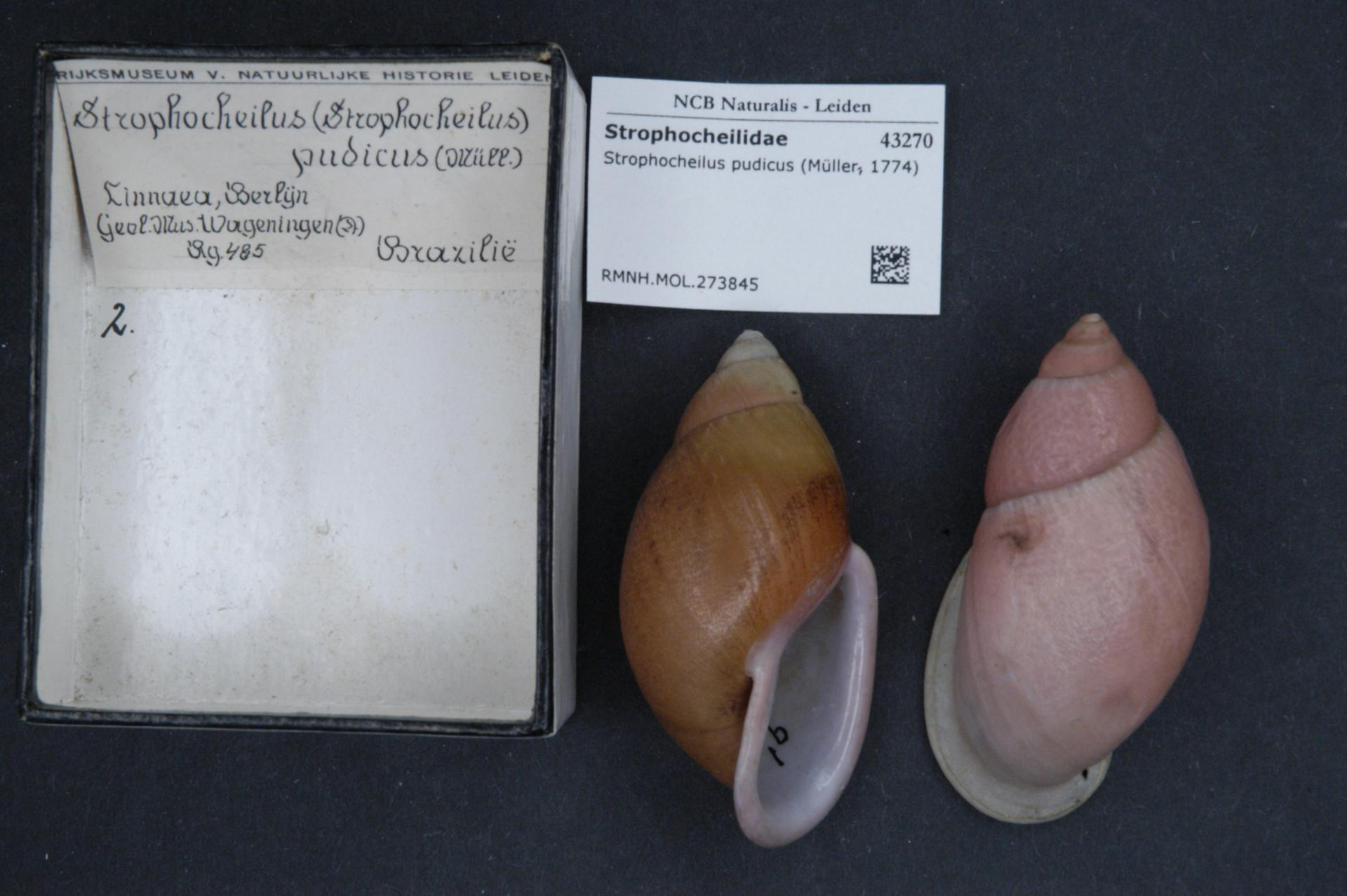
Strophocheilus pudicus

Strophocheilus is a genus of gastropods belonging to the family Strophocheilidae.

The species of this genus are found in Southern America.

Species:

- Strophocheilus calus Pilsbry, 1901
- Strophocheilus chubutensis Ihering, 1904
- Strophocheilus debilis Bequaert, 1948
- Strophocheilus groeberi Miquel & Manceñido, 1999
- Strophocheilus miersi Da Costa, 1904
- Strophocheilus ovatus
- Strophocheilus pudicus (O.F.Müller, 1774)
- Strophocheilus tenuis Haas, 1955
