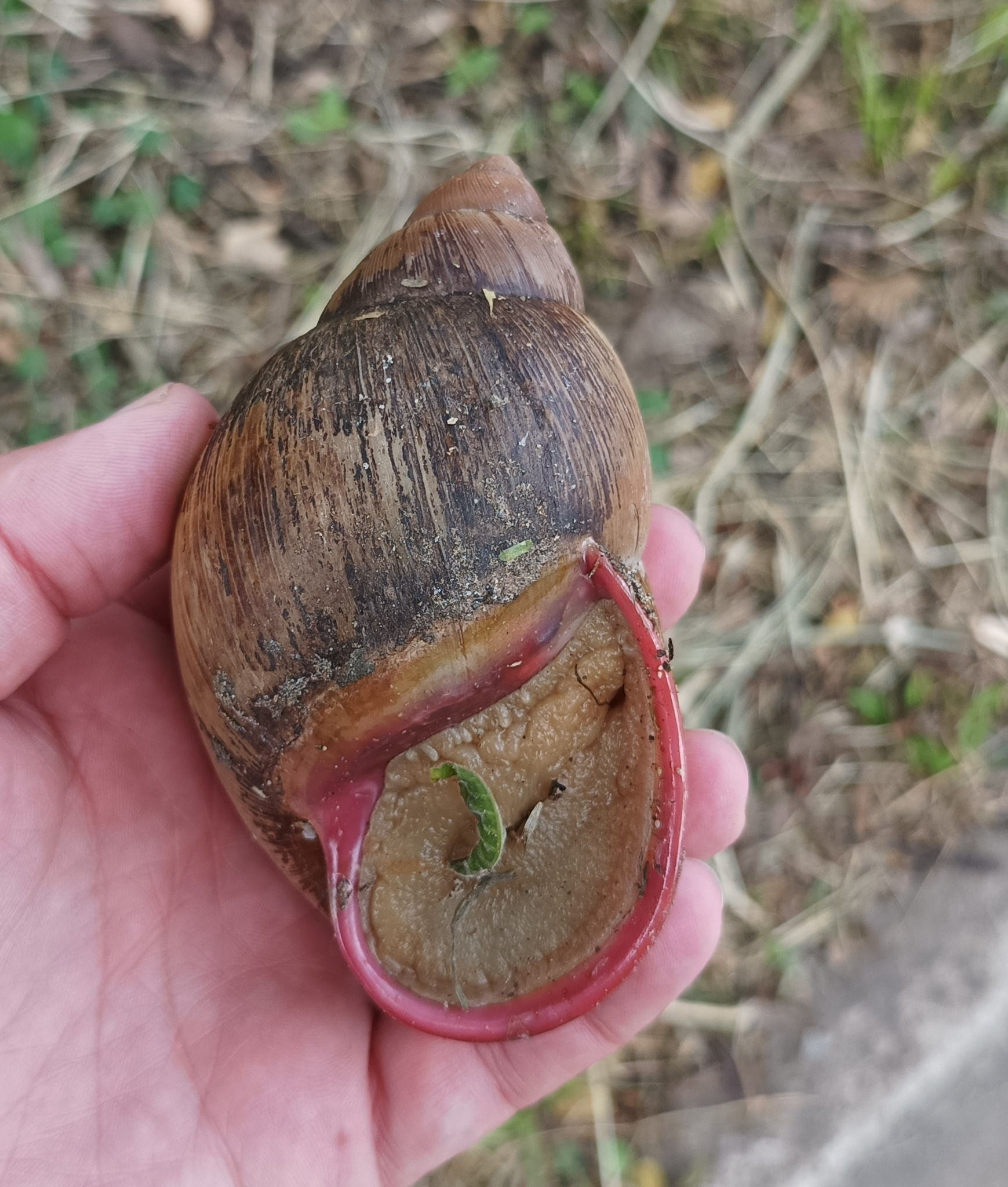
- A live specimen of Megalobulimus oblongus from Colombia

Scientific classification
- Kingdom: Animalia
- Phylum: Mollusca
- Class: Gastropoda
- Order: Stylommatophora
- Family: Strophocheilidae
- Genus: Megalobulimus
- Species: M. oblongus

Binomial name
- Megalobulimus oblongus (Müller, 1774)

Synonyms
- Strophocheilus oblongus

= Megalobulimus oblongus =

Species of gastropod

Megalobulimus oblongus, (synonym Strophocheilus oblongus), is a species of air-breathing land snail, a terrestrial pulmonate gastropod mollusk in the family Strophocheilidae. It is known as Guácara in Venezuela.

== Distribution ==
This species occurs in:

- Brazil
- Venezuela
- Barbados and other Lesser Antillean locations
- Uruguay
- Peru
- Trinidad and Tobago
