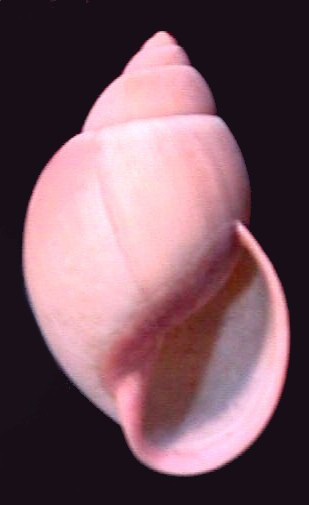
- Apertural view of a shell of Strophocheilus oblongus

Scientific classification
- Kingdom: Animalia
- Phylum: Mollusca
- Class: Gastropoda
- Order: Stylommatophora
- Suborder: Helicina
- Infraorder: Rhytidoidei
- Superfamily: Rhytidoidea
- Family: Strophocheilidae; Pilsbry, 1902

Type genus
- Strophocheilus

= Strophocheilidae =

Strophocheilidae Temporal range: Paleocene–Recent

Family of gastropods

Strophocheilidae is a taxonomic family of air-breathing land snails, terrestrial pulmonate gastropod mollusks in the superfamily Acavoidea (according to the taxonomy of the Gastropoda by Bouchet & Rocroi, 2005).

== Fossil record ==
The genus Eoborus is the family's oldest fossil record, dating from the Middle Paleocene of Brazil (Itaboraí Basin) and Uruguay (Santa Lucía Basin).

== Genera ==
The family Strophocheilidae consists of two subfamilies and genera including:

subfamily Strophocheilinae Pilsbry, 1902

- Austroborus Parodiz, 1949
- Chiliborus Pilsbry, 1926
- Mirinaba Morretes, 1952
- Speironepion Bequaert, 1948
- Strophocheilus Spix, 1827 - type genus of the family Strophocheilidae

subfamily Megalobuliminae Leme, 1973

- Megalobulimus K. Miller, 1878 - type genus of the subfamily Megalobuliminae

[unassigned] Strophocheilidae (temporary name):

- † Eoborus Klappenbach & Olazarri, 1970
- † Maghrebiola Kadolsky & Hammouda, 2017

Genera brought into synonymy

- Borus Albers, 1850: synonym of Megalobulimus K. Miller, 1878
- Coniclus Albers, 1850: synonym of Strophocheilus Spix in J. A. Wagner, 1827
- Goniostomus auct.: synonym of Gonyostomus H. Beck, 1837 (incorrect subsequent spelling)
- Gonyostoma Swainson, 1840: synonym of Gonyostomus H. Beck, 1837
- Metara Morretes, 1955: synonym of Mirinaba Morretes, 1955
- Microborus Pilsbry, 1926: synonym of Austroborus Parodiz, 1949 (unavailable, a junior homonym of Blandford, 1897 [Coleoptera])
- Phaiopharus Morretes, 1955: synonym of Megalobulimus K. Miller, 1878
- Psiloicus Morretes, 1955: synonym of Megalobulimus K. Miller, 1878
