= Pomacea occulta =

Scientific classification
- Domain: Eukaryota
- Kingdom: Animalia
- Phylum: Mollusca
- Class: Gastropoda
- Subclass: Caenogastropoda
- Order: Architaenioglossa
- Superfamily: Ampullarioidea
- Family: Ampullariidae
- Subfamily: Pomaceinae
- Genus: Pomacea
- Species: P. occulta

Binomial name
- Pomacea occulta Q.-Q. Yang & X.-P. Yu, 2019

Species of snail

Pomacea occulta is a species of freshwater snail in the family Ampullariidae. Previously misidentified as the cryptically similar Pomacea maculata, P. occulta was differentiated by Yang and Yu in 2019 using DNA barcoding and molecular systematics.

== Distribution ==
This species has only been identified from invasive populations in China, so its native region is not known, but would be somewhere in South America.
