= Pomacea ocanensis =

Conservation status
- Critically Endangered (IUCN 3.1)

Scientific classification
- Kingdom: Animalia
- Phylum: Mollusca
- Class: Gastropoda
- Subclass: Caenogastropoda
- Order: Architaenioglossa
- Superfamily: Ampullarioidea
- Family: Ampullariidae
- Subfamily: Pomaceinae
- Genus: Pomacea
- Species: P. ocanensis

Binomial name
- Pomacea ocanensis Kobelt, 1914

Synonyms
- Ampullaria auriformis var. ocanensis Kobelt, 1914 (original description)

Species of snail

Pomacea ocanensis is a species of freshwater snail in the Ampullariidae family. Wilhelm Kobelt originally described the species as a subspecies of Ampullaria auriformis in 1914.

It is native to Colombia and resides in the shallow margins of the Magdalena River near Ocaña, Norte de Santander.

A critically endangered species, P. ocanensis faces threats of declining habitat quality due to urbanization, local water management, and pollution. It is the only member of Pomacea considered Endangered or Critically Endangered by the IUCN and one of only two Ampullariids to be Critically Endangered.

== See also ==
- List of critically endangered molluscs
