= Pomacea auriformis =

Scientific classification (disputed)
- Kingdom: Animalia
- Phylum: Mollusca
- Class: Gastropoda
- Subclass: Caenogastropoda
- Order: Architaenioglossa
- Superfamily: Ampullarioidea
- Family: Ampullariidae
- Subfamily: Pomaceinae
- Genus: Pomacea
- Species: P. auriformis

Binomial name
- Pomacea auriformis Reeve, 1856

Synonyms
- Ampullaria auriformis Reeve, 1856 (original combination); Pomacea (Pomacea) auriformis (Reeve, 1856) · accepted, alternate representation

Species of snail

Pomacea auriformis is a species of freshwater snail in the family Ampullariidae, described by Lovell Augustus Reeve in 1856 as Ampullaria auriformis. Its distribution is along the Caribbean coast of Central America. There has been debate over whether this species may be a subspecies of Ampullaria hopetonensis.
