= Pomacea sinamarina =

Scientific classification
- Kingdom: Animalia
- Phylum: Mollusca
- Class: Gastropoda
- Subclass: Caenogastropoda
- Order: Architaenioglossa
- Superfamily: Ampullarioidea
- Family: Ampullariidae
- Subfamily: Pomaceinae
- Genus: Pomacea
- Species: P. sinamarina

Binomial name
- Pomacea sinamarina Bruguière, 1792

Synonyms
- Asolene (Surinamia) fairchildi Clench, 1933 · accepted, alternate representation; Ampullaria schrammi Crosse, 1876; Asolene fairchildi Clench, 1933; Asolene sinamarina (Bruguière, 1792); Bulimus sinamarinus Bruguière, 1792 (original combination); Pomella (Surinamia) sinamarina (Bruguière, 1792); Pomella sinamarina (Bruguière, 1792)

Species of snail

Pomacea sinamarina is a species of freshwater snail in the Ampullariidae family. It was first described in 1792 by Jean Guillaume Bruguière as Bulimus sinamarinus. Its distribution includes French Guiana and Suriname.
