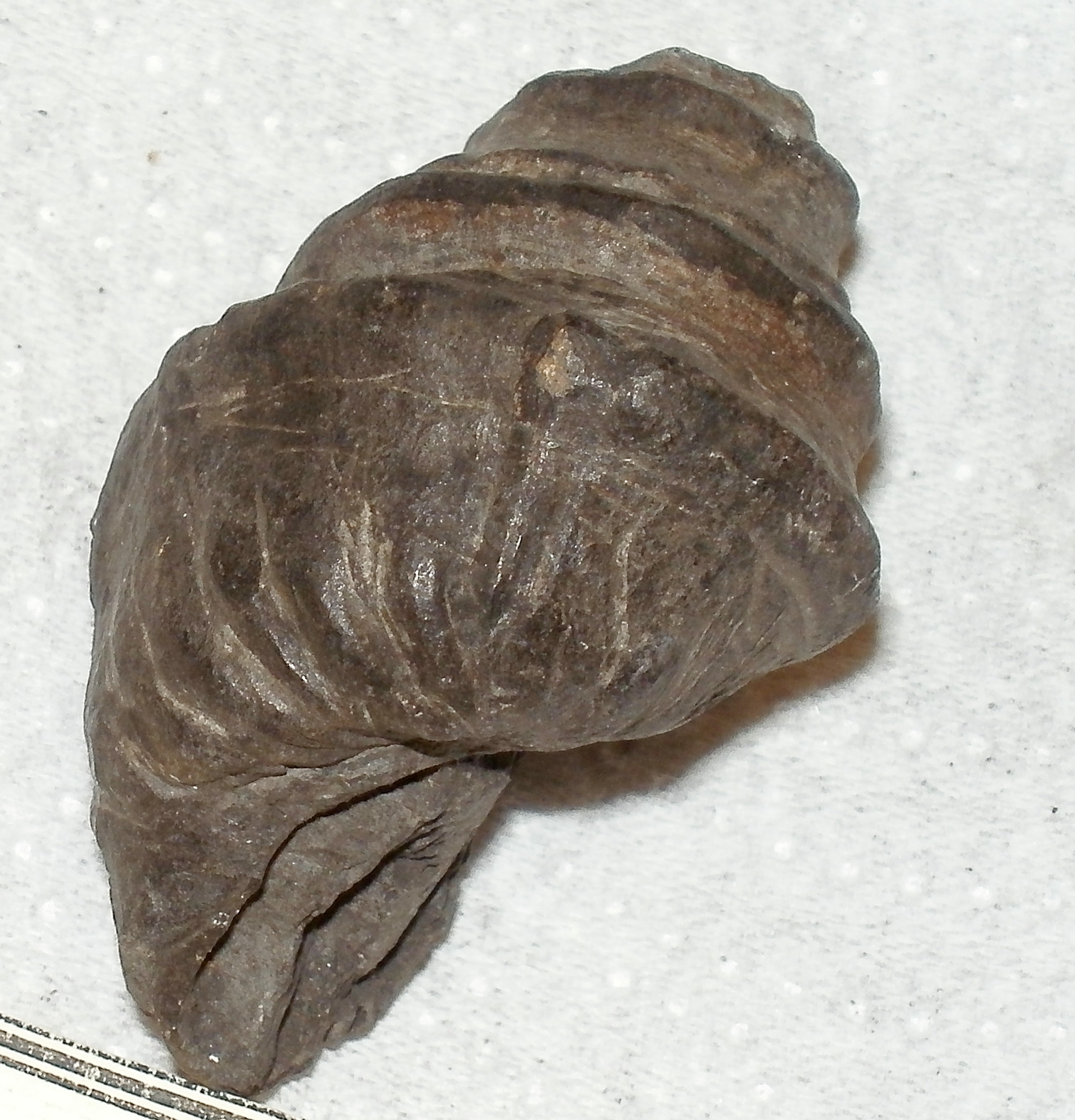
- A shell of Ampullaria bicarinata

Scientific classification
- Kingdom: Animalia
- Phylum: Mollusca
- Class: Gastropoda
- (unranked): clade Caenogastropoda informal group Architaenioglossa
- Superfamily: Ampullarioidea
- Family: Ampullariidae
- Genus: Ampullaria
- Species: A. bicarinata

Binomial name
- Ampullaria bicarinata Radovanović, 1900

= Ampullaria bicarinata =

Ampullaria bicarinata Temporal range: Early Pleistocene-Mid Holocene

Extinct species of gastropod

Ampullaria bicarinata is an extinct species of freshwater snail with an operculum, an aquatic gastropod mollusk in the family Ampullariidae. The current taxonomic status of this species is unresolved.

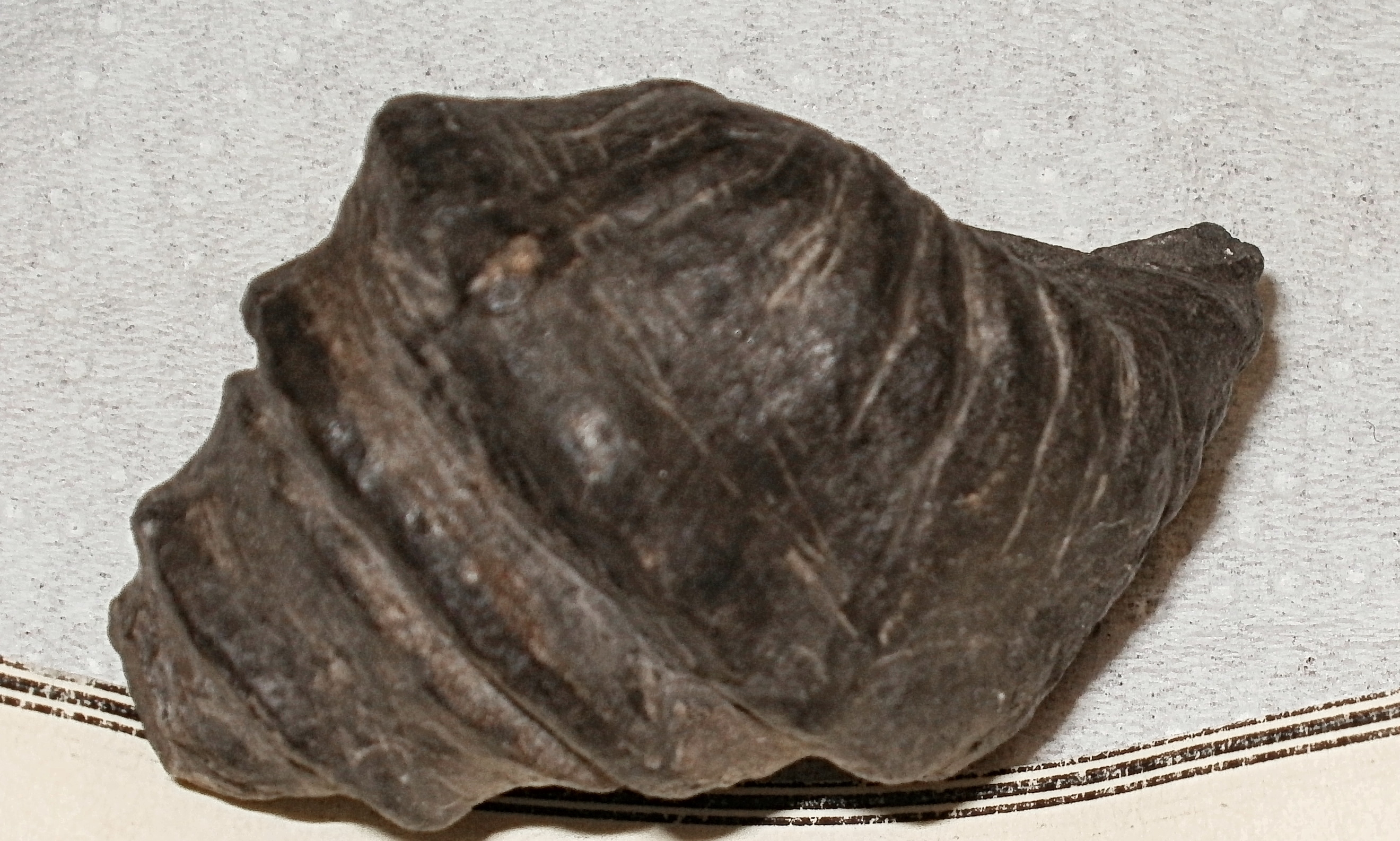
Shell of Ampullaria bicarinata

== Distribution ==
The type locality of Ampullaria bicarinata is Vrška Čuka (in Serbian Cyrillic: Вршка Чука), eastern Serbia near the border of Bulgaria.
