= Pomacea prunella =

Scientific classification
- Domain: Eukaryota
- Kingdom: Animalia
- Phylum: Mollusca
- Class: Gastropoda
- Subclass: Caenogastropoda
- Order: Architaenioglossa
- Superfamily: Ampullarioidea
- Family: Ampullariidae
- Subfamily: Pomaceinae
- Genus: Pomacea
- Species: P. prunella

Binomial name
- Pomacea prunella Hupé, 1857

Synonyms
- Ampullaria prunella Hupé, 1857 (original combination)

Species of snail

Pomacea prunella is a species of freshwater snail in the family Ampullariidae. It is known from Brazil and French Guiana. Unlike other New World Ampullariids, P. prunella has a calcified, rather than corneous, operculum.
