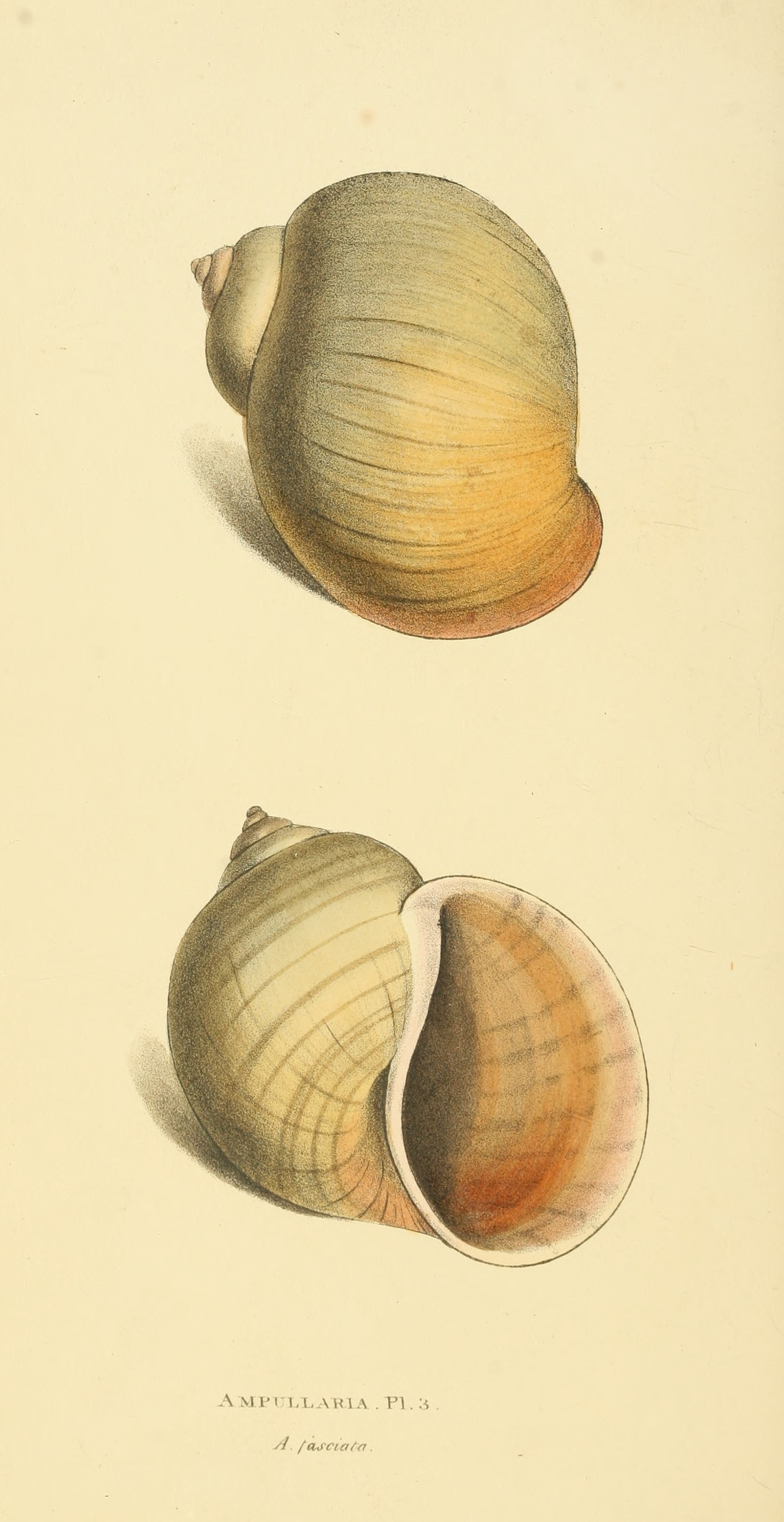
- Illustration of the shells of Pomacea fasciata

Scientific classification
- Domain: Eukaryota
- Kingdom: Animalia
- Phylum: Mollusca
- Class: Gastropoda
- Subclass: Caenogastropoda
- Order: Architaenioglossa
- Superfamily: Ampullarioidea
- Family: Ampullariidae
- Subfamily: Pomaceinae
- Genus: Pomacea
- Species: P. fasciata

Binomial name
- Pomacea fasciata (de Roissy, 1805)

Synonyms
- Ampullaria buxea Reeve, 1856; Ampullaria cincta de Cristofori & Jan, 1832; Ampullaria fasciata de Roissy, 1805 (original combination); Pomacea (Pomacea) fasciata (de Roissy, 1805) · accepted, alternate representation

= Pomacea fasciata =

Species of snail

Pomacea fasciata is a freshwater snail in the Ampullariidae family. It is known from Jamaica, Guadeloupe, and Hispaniola. It lays white eggs.
