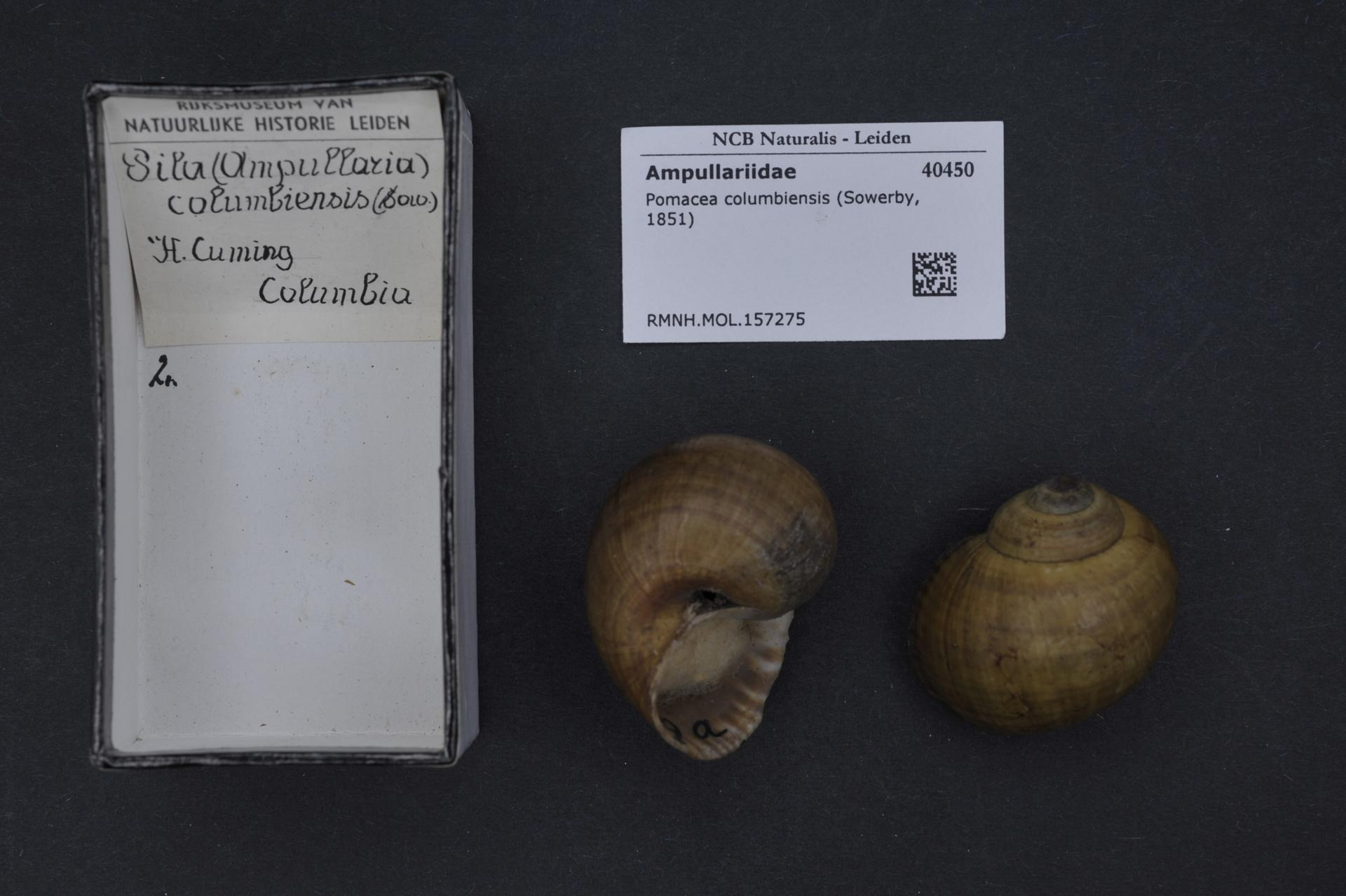

Scientific classification
- Domain: Eukaryota
- Kingdom: Animalia
- Phylum: Mollusca
- Class: Gastropoda
- Subclass: Caenogastropoda
- Order: Architaenioglossa
- Superfamily: Ampullarioidea
- Family: Ampullariidae
- Subfamily: Pomaceinae
- Genus: Pomacea
- Species: P. columbiensis

Binomial name
- Pomacea columbiensis Philippi, 1851

Synonyms
- Ampullaria columbiensis Philippi, 1851 (original combination)

= Pomacea columbiensis =

Species of snail

Pomacea columbiensis is a species of freshwater snail in the family Ampullariidae. It is native to Colombia, found in the Magdalena and Cauca rivers, and Ecuador, in the Pastaza River.
