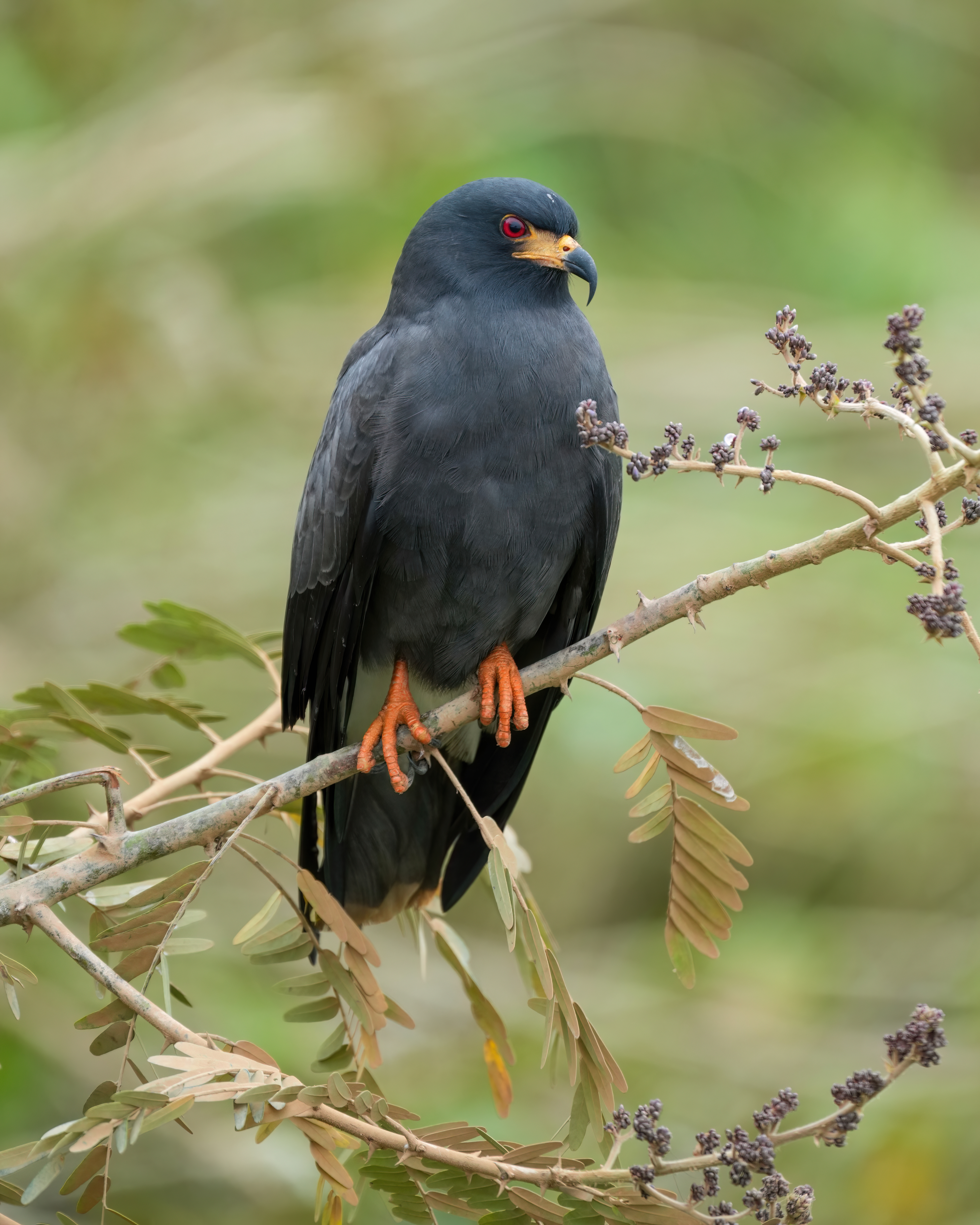
- Adult male, Brazil
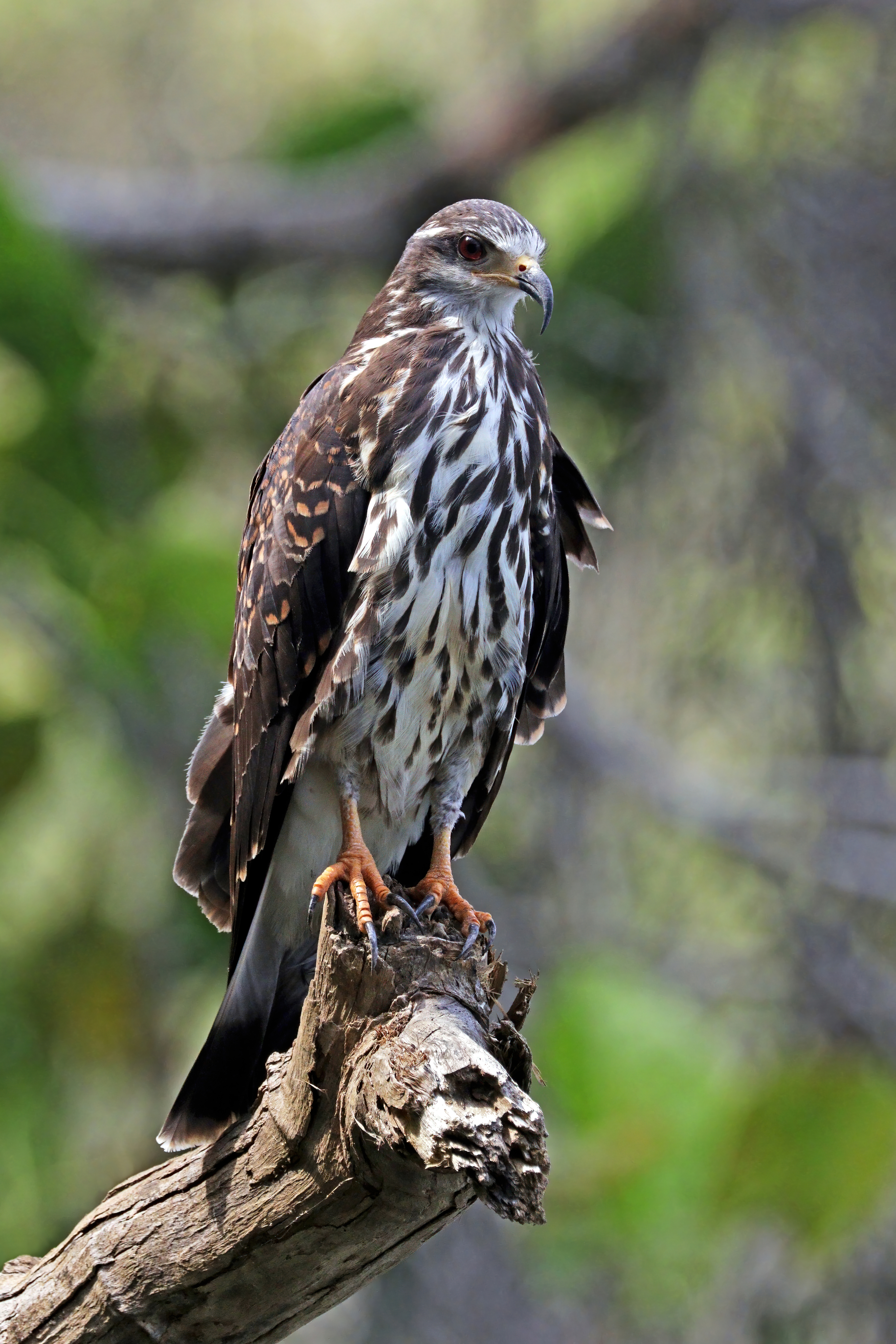
- Adult female, Panama

Conservation status
- Least Concern (IUCN 3.1)

Scientific classification
- Kingdom: Animalia
- Phylum: Chordata
- Class: Aves
- Order: Accipitriformes
- Family: Accipitridae
- Subfamily: Buteoninae
- Genus: Rostrhamus; Lesson, 1830
- Species: R. sociabilis

Binomial name
- Rostrhamus sociabilis (Vieillot, 1817)

Subspecies
- R. s. plumbeus - Ridgway, 1874; R. s. levis - Friedmann, 1933; R. s. major - Nelson & Goldman, 1933; R. s. sociabilis - (Vieillot, 1817)
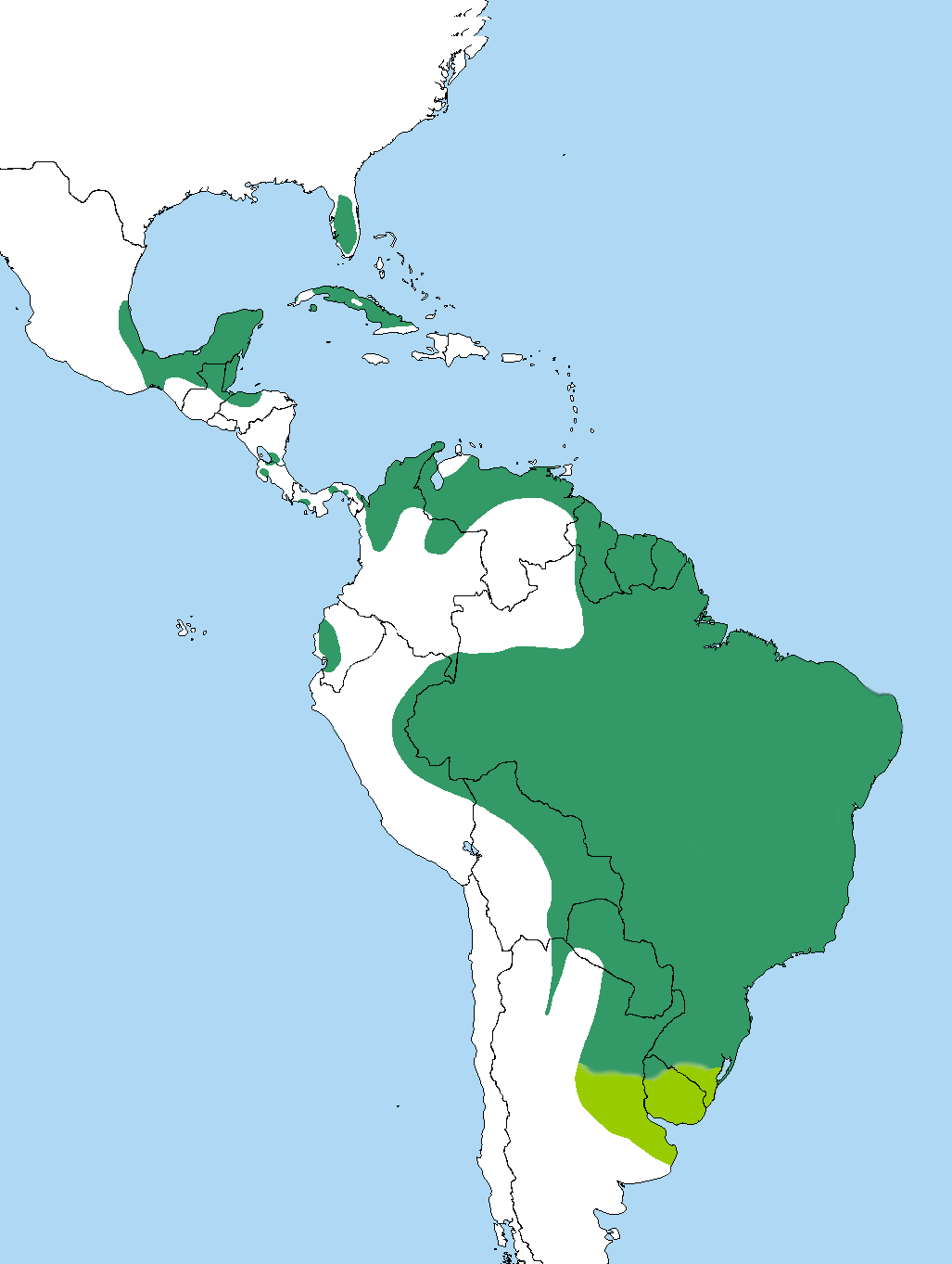
- Range of R. sociabilis All-year resident Breeding only range Area of breeding and vagrancy

= Snail kite =

Species of bird

The snail kite (Rostrhamus sociabilis) is a bird of prey within the family Accipitridae, which also includes the eagles, hawks, and Old World vultures. Its relative, the slender-billed kite, is now again placed in Helicolestes, making the genus Rostrhamus monotypic. Usually, it is placed in the Milvine kites, but the validity of that grouping is under investigation.

== Taxonomy ==
Lerner and Mindell (2005) found R. sociabilis sister to Geranospiza caerulescens, and that those two along with Ictinea plumbea were basal to both the Buteogallus and Buteo clades. They concluded that Rostrhamus belonged in Buteoninae (sensu stricto) and not in Milvinae, but noted that more investigation was needed.

== Distribution ==
The snail kite breeds in tropical South America, the Caribbean, and central and southern Florida in the United States. It is resident all-year round in most of its range, but the southernmost population migrates north in winter and the Caribbean birds disperse widely outside the breeding season.

== Description ==
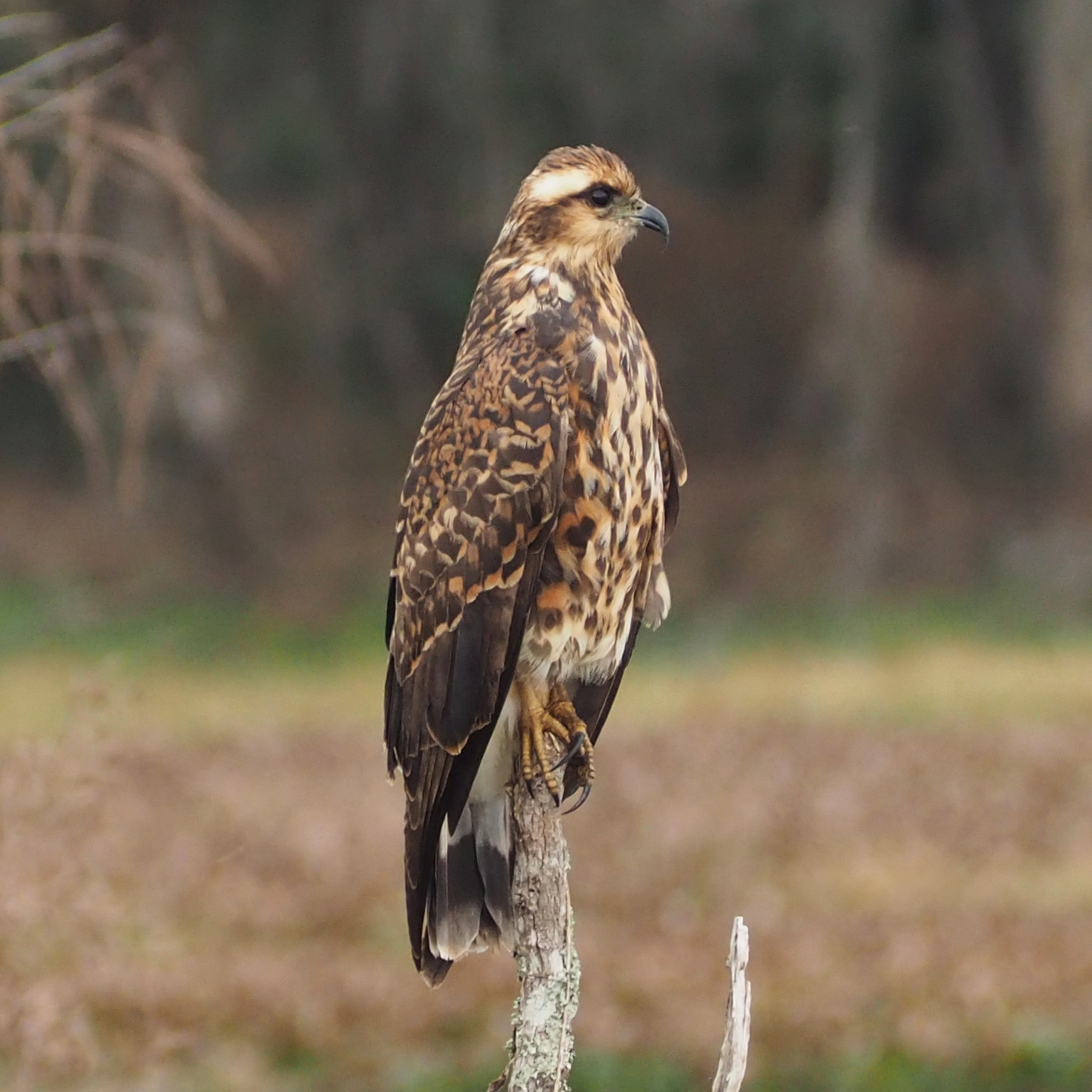
Juvenile

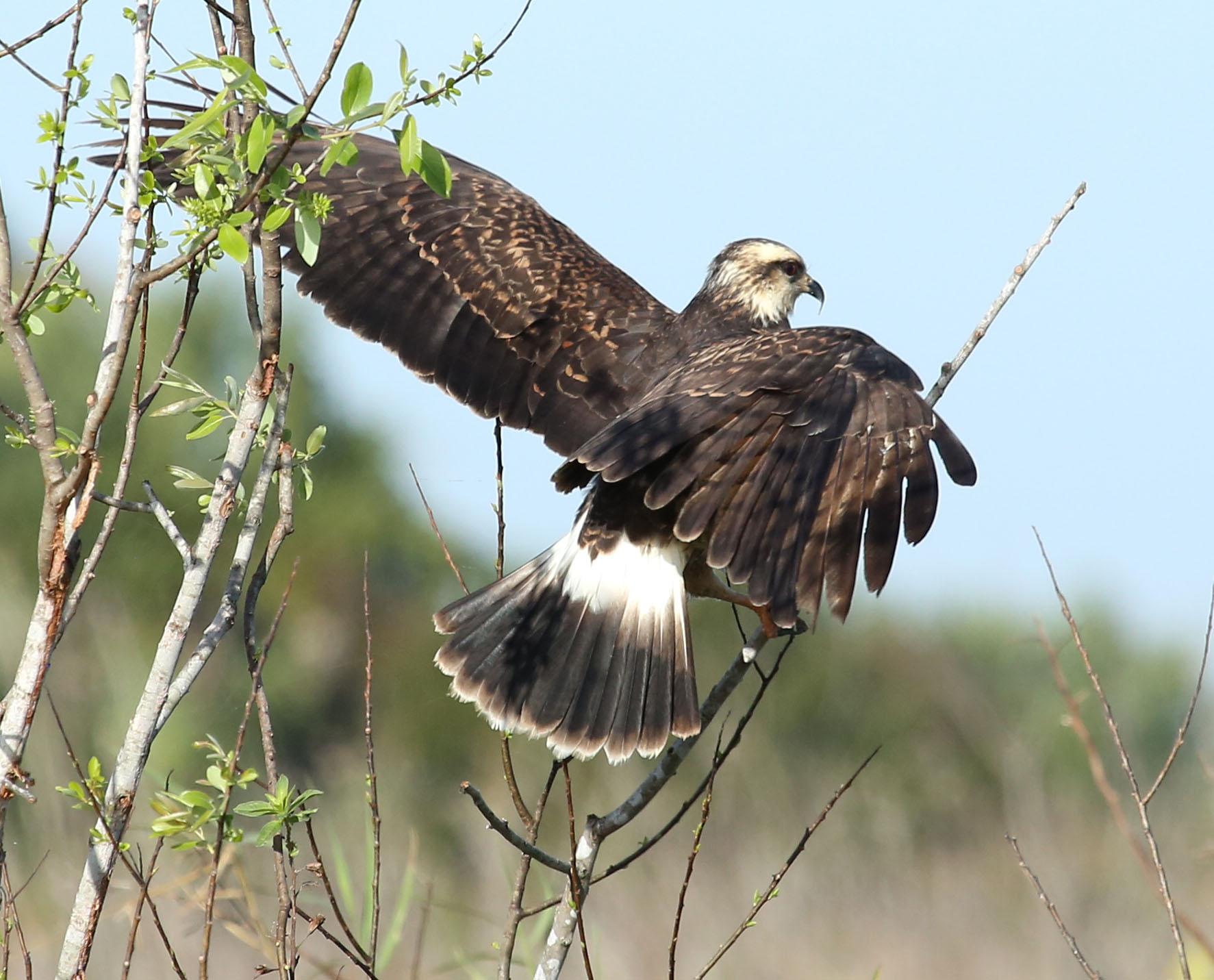
Female Snail Kite, Lake Okeechobee, Florida

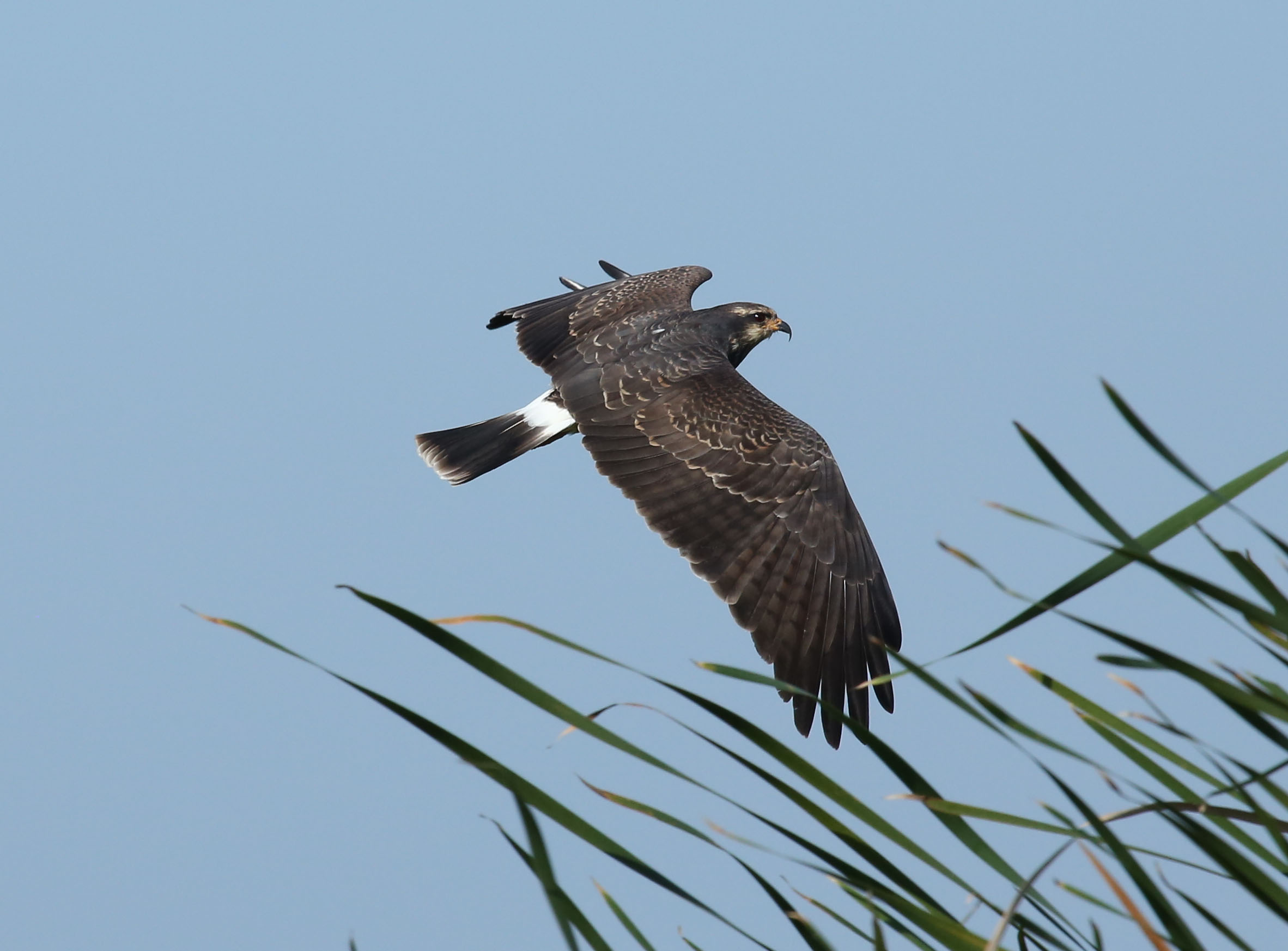
Male Snail Kite, Lake Okeechobee, Florida

Snail kites are 36 to 48 cm (14 to 19 in) long with a 99–120 cm (39–47 in) wingspan. They weigh from 300 to 570 g (11 to 20 oz). There is very limited sexual dimorphism, with the female averaging only 3% larger than the male. They have long, broad, and rounded wings, which measure 29–33 cm (11–13 in) each. Its tail is long, at 16–21 cm (6.3–8.3 in), with a white rump and undertail coverts. The dark, deeply hooked beak, measuring 2.9–4 cm (1.1–1.6 in) is an adaptation to its diet. The tarsus is relatively long as well, measuring 3.6–5.7 cm (1.4–2.2 in).

The adult male has dark blue-gray plumage with darker flight feathers. The legs and cere are red. The adult female has dark brown upperparts and heavily streaked pale underparts. She has a whitish face with darker areas behind and above the eye. The legs and cere are yellow or orange. The juvenile is similar to an adult female, but the crown is streaked. Adults have red or orangish-brown irises, while juveniles have dark brown irises.

It flies slowly with its head facing downwards, looking for its main food, the large apple snails. For this reason, it is considered a molluscivore.

== Breeding ==
It nests in a bush or on the ground, laying three to four eggs.

== Conservation ==
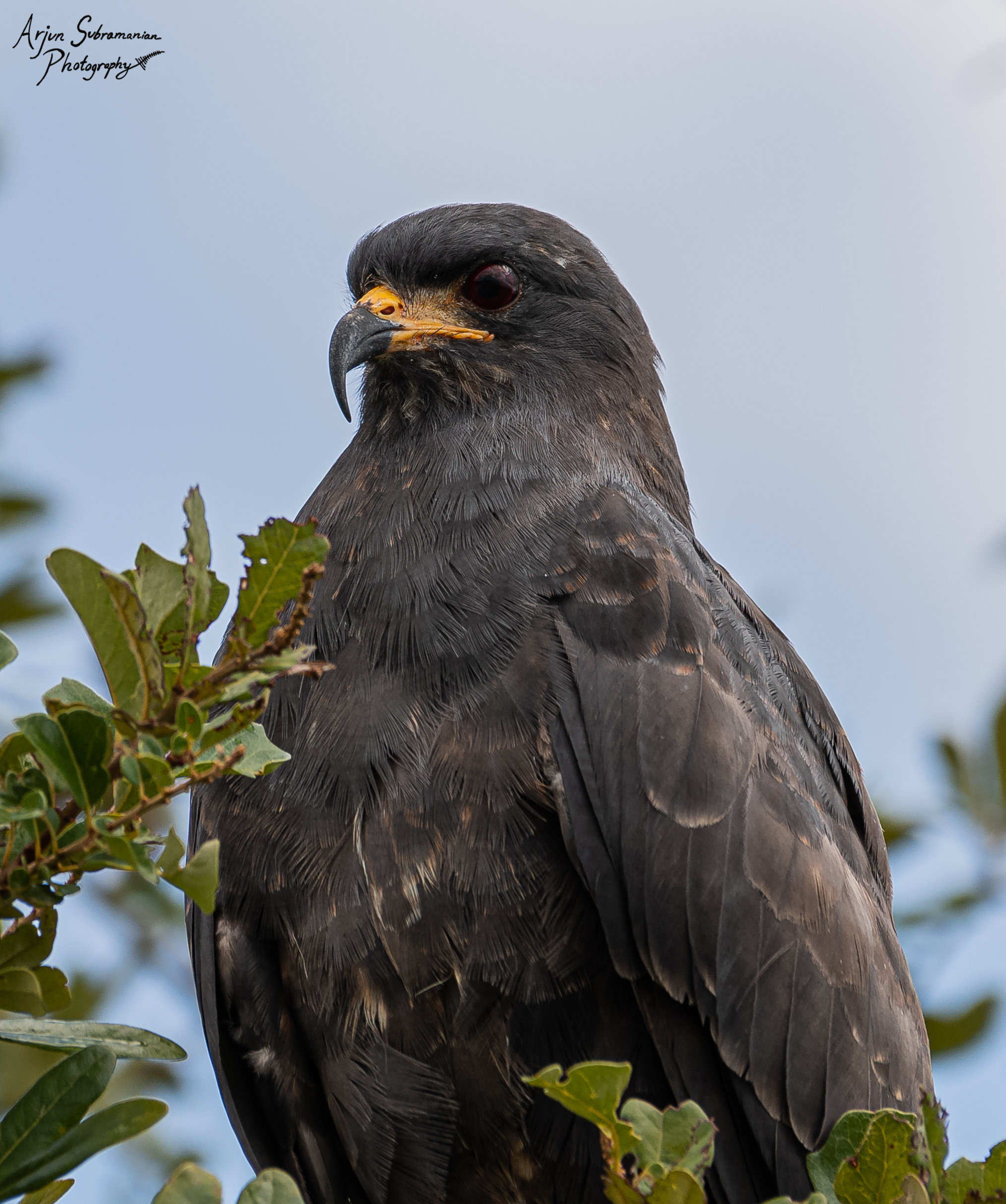
Adult male Everglades snail kite in Joe Overstreet Landing, Florida.

The snail kite is a locally endangered species in the Florida Everglades, with a population of less than 400 breeding pairs. Research has demonstrated that water-level control in the Everglades is depleting the population of apple snails. However, this species is not generally threatened over its extensive range.

In fact, it might be locally increasing in numbers, such as in Central America. In El Salvador, it was first recorded in 1996. Since then, it has been regularly sighted, including immature birds, suggesting a resident breeding population might already exist in that country. On the other hand, most records are outside the breeding season, more indicative of post-breeding dispersal. In El Salvador, the species can be observed during the winter months at Embalse Cerrón Grande, Laguna El Jocotal, and especially Lago de Güija. Pomacea flagellata apple snails were propagated in El Salvador between 1982 and 1986 as food for fish stocks, and it seems that the widespread presence of high numbers of these snails has not gone unnoticed by the snail kite.

=== In the Everglades ===
Due to the drainage and habitat destruction of the Everglades, they were one of the first species put on the US Fish and Wildlife Service's endangered species list on 11 March 1967. The snail kite continued to decline, reaching a population of less than 800 in 2007. One factor for the decline in the 2000s was the introduction of the invasive South American snail Pomacea maculata, which were five times bigger than the native Pomacea paludosa species, and most kites could not eat the new snails. However, the kites quickly evolved to be 12% bigger to adapt to the new food source. This population gradually rebounded, reaching a count of 3,000 snail kites in 2022. Everglades conservation efforts over the course of 30 years and costing over US$20 billion also contributed to restoring native vegetation of the snail kites' habitats and flow of water in marshes.

== Diet ==
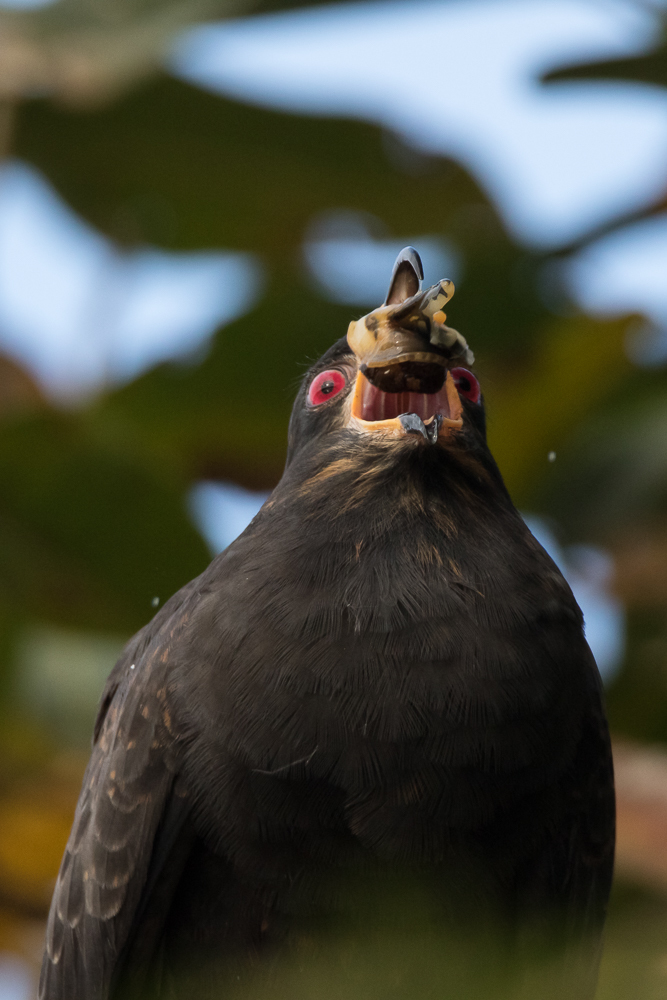
Eating a snail

This is a gregarious bird of freshwater wetlands, forming large winter roosts. Its diet consists almost exclusively of apple snails, especially the species Pomacea diffusa, P. maculata and P. paludosa in Florida, other species of Pomacea (P. doliodes) elsewhere in its range, and species of the genus Marisa (M. cornuarietis).

Snail kites have been observed eating other prey items in Florida, including other freshwater snail species (such as the banded mystery snail), crayfish in the genus Procambarus, crabs in the genera Dilocarcinus and Poppiana (P. dentata), black crappie, ring-necked snakes, small turtles (including the common musk turtle, striped mud turtle, coastal plain cooter, Florida red-bellied cooter, Florida softshell turtle, and other unidentified species), rodents and carcasses (based only on a single reported case of a dead American coot). It is believed that snail kites turn to these alternatives only when apple snails become scarce, such as during drought, but further study is needed. On 14 May 2007, a birder photographed a snail kite feeding at a red swamp crayfish farm in Clarendon County, South Carolina.

The presence of the large introduced Pomacea maculata in Florida has led the snail kites in North America to develop larger bodies and beaks to better eat the snail, a case of rapid evolution. These non-native snails provide a better food source than the smaller native snails and have had a positive effect on the kites' populations.

== Predation ==
In Florida, snail kites may be eaten by some growth stage of invasive snakes such as Burmese pythons, reticulated pythons, Southern African rock pythons, Central African rock pythons, boa constrictors, yellow anacondas, Bolivian anacondas, dark-spotted anacondas, and green anacondas.
