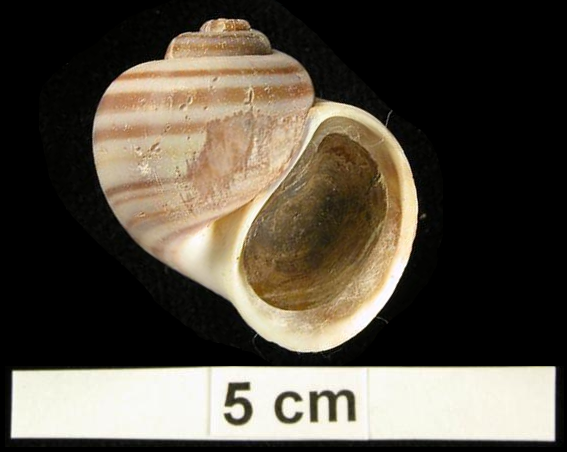

Scientific classification
- Domain: Eukaryota
- Kingdom: Animalia
- Phylum: Mollusca
- Class: Gastropoda
- Subclass: Caenogastropoda
- Order: Architaenioglossa
- Superfamily: Ampullarioidea
- Family: Ampullariidae
- Subfamily: Pomaceinae
- Genus: Pomacea
- Species: P. cumingii

Binomial name
- Pomacea cumingii P. P. King & Broderip, 1831

Synonyms
- Ampullaria cumingii P. P. King, 1832 (original combination); Pomacea cumingi (Reeve, 1843) · alternate spelling in some publications; Pomacea cumingii (Reeve, 1843); Pomacea (Pomacea) cumingii (P. P. King, 1832) · accepted, alternate representation

= Pomacea cumingii =

Species of snail

Pomacea cumingii is a species of freshwater snail in the family Ampullariidae. It is native to Saboga. A non-native population has been found in Puerto Rico.

Two subspecies of P. cumingii are recognized: P. c. cumingii and P. c. sanjoseensis (Morrison, 1946). P. c. sanjoseensis is found only in a few small streams on Isla San José and is larger than the other subspecies.
