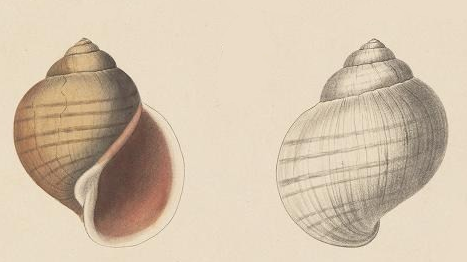
- Shell of Pomacea columellaris

Scientific classification
- Kingdom: Animalia
- Phylum: Mollusca
- Class: Gastropoda
- Subclass: Caenogastropoda
- Order: Architaenioglossa
- Family: Ampullariidae
- Genus: Pomacea
- Species: P. columellaris

Binomial name
- Pomacea columellaris (A. Gould, 1848)

Synonyms
- Ampullaria columellaris Gould, 1848; Ampullaria robusta Philippi, 1852; Pomacea (pomacea) columellaris (A. Gould, 1848)· accepted, alternate representation

= Pomacea columellaris =

Species of snail

Pomacea columellaris is a South American species of freshwater snail in the apple snail family, Ampullariidae.

== Taxonomy ==
Pomacea columellaris was originally described as Ampullaria columellaris by Augustus Addison Gould in 1848, based on a holotype shell collected during the United States Exploring Expedition from 1838-1842. They were named for their notable columella, comparable to those of Helix land snails. In 1904, Dall proposed a section or subgenus of Ampullaria (later treated as synonymous with Pomacea) called Limnopomus, with A. columellaris as the type species. After 1991, Limnopomus was also considered synonymous with Pomacea.

== Shell description ==
The species has a heavy, oval shell with a sharp spire. Its operculum is corneous and able to retract inside the shell's aperture. They lack an umbilicus and are often yellow in color.

== Distribution ==
P. columellaris is found in rivers in the highlands of Venezuela, Colombia, Ecuador (Pastaza Province), and Peru.
