= Pomacea aurostoma =

Conservation status
- Least Concern (IUCN 3.1)

Scientific classification
- Kingdom: Animalia
- Phylum: Mollusca
- Class: Gastropoda
- Subclass: Caenogastropoda
- Order: Architaenioglossa
- Family: Ampullariidae
- Genus: Pomacea
- Species: P. aurostoma

Binomial name
- Pomacea aurostoma (Lea, 1856)

Species of gastropod

Pomacea aurostoma is a South American species of freshwater snail with gills and an operculum, an aquatic gastropod mollusc in the family Ampullariidae, the apple snails.

== Distribution ==
The native distribution of P. aurostoma is Colombia and Venezuela.
