= Pomacea camena =

Conservation status
- Data Deficient (IUCN 3.1)

Scientific classification
- Kingdom: Animalia
- Phylum: Mollusca
- Class: Gastropoda
- Subclass: Caenogastropoda
- Order: Architaenioglossa
- Family: Ampullariidae
- Genus: Pomacea
- Species: P. camena

Binomial name
- Pomacea camena (Pain, 1949)

Species of gastropod

Pomacea camena is a South American species of freshwater snail with gills and an operculum, an aquatic gastropod mollusc in the family Ampullariidae, the apple snails.

== Distribution ==
P. camena is endemic to Venezuela, where it is found in a shallow stream near Lagunella, at an altitude of 8000 m.
