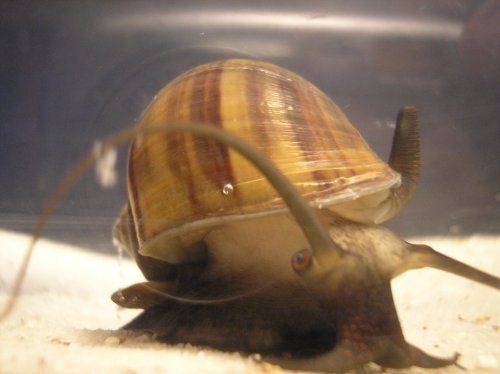

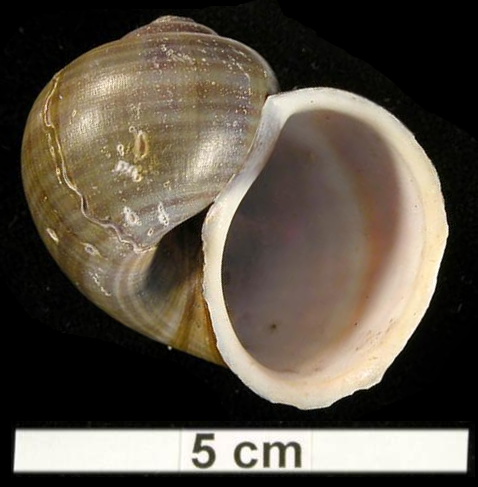
- Apertural view of a shell of Pomacea lineata

Conservation status
- Least Concern (IUCN 3.1)

Scientific classification
- Kingdom: Animalia
- Phylum: Mollusca
- Class: Gastropoda
- Subclass: Caenogastropoda
- Order: Architaenioglossa
- Family: Ampullariidae
- Genus: Pomacea
- Species: P. lineata

Binomial name
- Pomacea lineata (Spix, 1827)

= Pomacea lineata =

Species of gastropod

Pomacea lineata is a species of a freshwater snail with gills and an operculum, an aquatic gastropod mollusk in the family Ampullariidae, the apple snails.

== Distribution ==
This species occurs in Brazil.

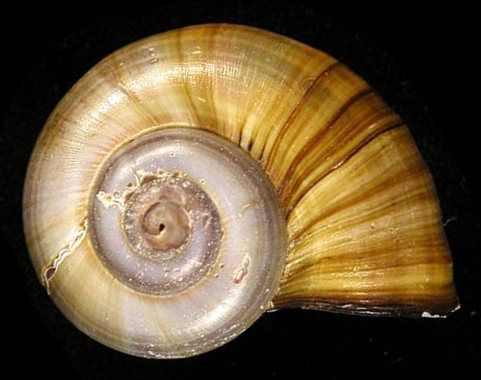
Apical view of a shell of Pomacea lineata

== Ecology ==
The apple snail is a keystone species in Pantanal's ecosystem. When the wetlands are flooded once a year, the grass and other plants will eventually die and start to decay. During this process, decomposing microbes deplete the shallow water of all oxygen, suffocating larger decomposers. Unlike other decomposing animals, the apple snail have both gills and lungs, making it possible for them to thrive in anoxic waters where they recycle the nutrients. To get oxygen they extend a long snorkel to the water surface, and pump air into their lungs. This ability allows them to consume all the dead plant matter and turning it into nutritious fertilizer available for the plants in the area. The snails themselves are also food for a variety of animals.

== Human use ==
Pomacea lineata is used as a zootherapeutical product for the treatment of asthma, sprains, boils and ulcer in traditional Brazilian medicine in the Northeast of Brazil.
