= Pomacea quinindensis =

Conservation status
- Vulnerable (IUCN 3.1)

Scientific classification
- Kingdom: Animalia
- Phylum: Mollusca
- Class: Gastropoda
- Subclass: Caenogastropoda
- Order: Architaenioglossa
- Family: Ampullariidae
- Genus: Pomacea
- Species: P. quinindensis

Binomial name
- Pomacea quinindensis (K. Miller, 1879)

Species of gastropod

Pomacea quinindensis is a South American species of freshwater snail with gills and an operculum, an aquatic gastropod mollusc in the family Ampullariidae, the apple snails.

== Distribution ==
P. quinindensis is endemic to Ecuador. It is currently known from only a few specimens collected from the Rio Quinindé.
