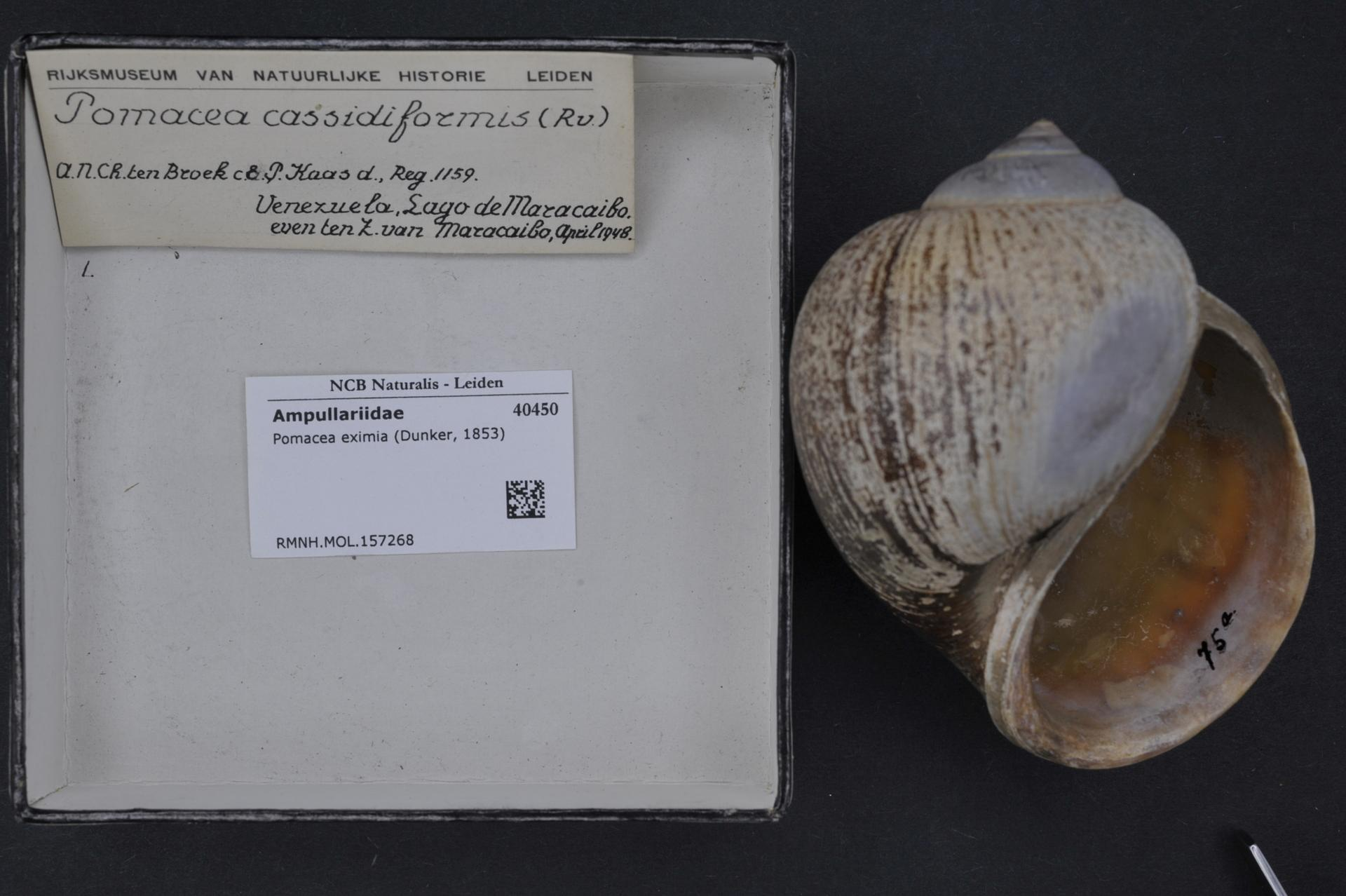

Conservation status
- Data Deficient (IUCN 3.1)

Scientific classification
- Kingdom: Animalia
- Phylum: Mollusca
- Class: Gastropoda
- Subclass: Caenogastropoda
- Order: Architaenioglossa
- Family: Ampullariidae
- Genus: Pomacea
- Species: P. eximia

Binomial name
- Pomacea eximia (Dunker, 1853)

Synonyms
- Ampullaria cassidiformis Reeve, 1856; Ampullaria eximia Dunker, 1853 (original combination); Pomacea (Pomacea) eximia (Dunker, 1853) · accepted, alternate representation

= Pomacea eximia =

Species of gastropod

Pomacea eximia is a South American species of freshwater snail with gills and an operculum, an aquatic gastropod mollusc in the family Ampullariidae, the apple snails.

== Distribution ==
P. eximia is endemic to Venezuela.
