= Pomacea vexillum =

Conservation status
- Data Deficient (IUCN 3.1)

Scientific classification
- Kingdom: Animalia
- Phylum: Mollusca
- Class: Gastropoda
- Subclass: Caenogastropoda
- Order: Architaenioglossa
- Family: Ampullariidae
- Genus: Pomacea
- Species: P. vexillum

Binomial name
- Pomacea vexillum (Reeve, 1856)

Species of gastropod

Pomacea vexillum is a South American species of freshwater snail with gills and an operculum, an aquatic gastropod mollusc in the family Ampullariidae, the apple snails.

== Taxonomic note ==
P. vexillum is considered a synonym of P. puncticulata by some authors.

== Distribution ==
P. vexillum is known from Venezuela and Guyana.
