= Pomacea hollingsworthi =

Conservation status
- Data Deficient (IUCN 3.1)

Scientific classification
- Kingdom: Animalia
- Phylum: Mollusca
- Class: Gastropoda
- Subclass: Caenogastropoda
- Order: Architaenioglossa
- Family: Ampullariidae
- Genus: Pomacea
- Species: P. hollingsworthi

Binomial name
- Pomacea hollingsworthi (Pain, 1946)

Species of gastropod

Pomacea hollingsworthi is a South American species of freshwater snail with gills and an operculum, an aquatic gastropod mollusc in the family Ampullariidae, the apple snails.

== Distribution ==
The native distribution of P. hollingsworthi is Colombia. It was described from fifteen specimens, collected in a swiftly flowing stream with a rocky bed near Bogotá in February 1939.
