= Pomacea zischkai =

Conservation status
- Data Deficient (IUCN 3.1)

Scientific classification
- Kingdom: Animalia
- Phylum: Mollusca
- Class: Gastropoda
- Subclass: Caenogastropoda
- Order: Architaenioglossa
- Family: Ampullariidae
- Genus: Pomacea
- Species: P. zischkai

Binomial name
- Pomacea zischkai Blume & Pain, 1952

Species of gastropod

Pomacea zischkai is a South American species of freshwater snail in the family Ampullariidae, the apple snails.

== Etymology ==
P. zischkai is named after Bolivian biologist Rodolfo Zischka, who collected the types.

== Distribution and habitat ==
P. zischkai is endemic to Bolivia. It is found in the Chapare region, at an altitude of 400 m. It occurs in rivers.

== Description ==
The shell measures 28 mm–34 mm × 25 mm–29 mm (1.10 in–1.34 in × 0.98 in–1.14 in) (length × width) and is thin and semi-transparent. The aperture is 19 mm–22 mm × 14 mm–16 mm (0.75 in–0.87 in × 0.55 in–0.63 in).
