= Pomacea catamarcensis =

Conservation status
- Data Deficient (IUCN 3.1)

Scientific classification
- Kingdom: Animalia
- Phylum: Mollusca
- Class: Gastropoda
- Subclass: Caenogastropoda
- Order: Architaenioglossa
- Family: Ampullariidae
- Genus: Pomacea
- Species: P. catamarcensis

Binomial name
- Pomacea catamarcensis (Sowerby III, 1875)

Synonyms
- Ampullaria catamarcensis G. B. Sowerby III, 1875 (original combination); Pomacea (Pomacea) catamarcensis (G. B. Sowerby III, 1875) · accepted, alternate representation

Species of gastropod

Pomacea catamarcensis is a South American species of freshwater snail with gills and an operculum, an aquatic gastropod mollusc in the family Ampullariidae, the apple snails.

== Distribution ==
P. catamarcensis is endemic to Peru.
