= Pomacea aldersoni =

Conservation status
- Least Concern (IUCN 3.1)

Scientific classification
- Kingdom: Animalia
- Phylum: Mollusca
- Class: Gastropoda
- Subclass: Caenogastropoda
- Order: Architaenioglossa
- Family: Ampullariidae
- Genus: Pomacea
- Species: P. aldersoni

Binomial name
- Pomacea aldersoni (Pain, 1946)

Species of gastropod

Pomacea aldersoni is a South American species of freshwater snail with gills and an operculum, an aquatic gastropod mollusc in the family Ampullariidae, the apple snails.

== Etymology ==
P. aldersoni is named after the British conchologist and malacologist E. G. Alderson, who authored a revision of the genus Ampullaria in 1925.

== Distribution ==
The native distribution of P. aldersoni is Ecuador. It was described from thirteen specimens which were collected in Santa Barbara, about 272 km SE. of Quito, in 1939.
