= Pomacea baeri =

Conservation status
- Data Deficient (IUCN 3.1)

Scientific classification
- Kingdom: Animalia
- Phylum: Mollusca
- Class: Gastropoda
- Subclass: Caenogastropoda
- Order: Architaenioglossa
- Family: Ampullariidae
- Genus: Pomacea
- Species: P. baeri

Binomial name
- Pomacea baeri (Dautzenberg, 1902)

Synonyms
- Ampullaria baeri Dautzenberg, 1902 (original combination); Pomacea (Effusa) baeri (Dautzenberg, 1902) · accepted, alternate representation

Species of gastropod

Pomacea baeri is a South American species of freshwater snail in the family Ampullariidae, the apple snails. Its possible synonymy with Pomacea glauca is unresolved.

== Distribution ==
P. baeri is endemic to Peru; it has been collected from the Río Mixiollo in Huallaga Province.
