= Pomacea reyrei =

Conservation status
- Data Deficient (IUCN 3.1)

Scientific classification
- Kingdom: Animalia
- Phylum: Mollusca
- Class: Gastropoda
- Subclass: Caenogastropoda
- Order: Architaenioglossa
- Family: Ampullariidae
- Genus: Pomacea
- Species: P. reyrei

Binomial name
- Pomacea reyrei (Cousin, 1887)

Species of gastropod

Pomacea reyrei is a South American species of freshwater snail with gills and an operculum, an aquatic gastropod mollusc in the family Ampullariidae, the apple snails.

== Distribution ==
P. reyrei is endemic to Venezuela.
