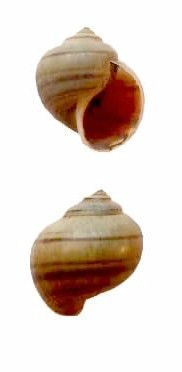
- Two views of a shells of Pomacea falconensis

Scientific classification
- Kingdom: Animalia
- Phylum: Mollusca
- Class: Gastropoda
- Subclass: Caenogastropoda
- Order: Architaenioglossa
- Family: Ampullariidae
- Genus: Pomacea
- Species: P. falconensis

Binomial name
- Pomacea falconensis Pain & Arias, 1958

= Pomacea falconensis =

Species of gastropod

Falcón apple snail (Pomacea falconensis) is a South American species of freshwater snail with gills and an operculum, an aquatic gastropod mollusk in the family Ampullariidae.

Falcón apple snail

== Distribution ==
The native distribution of this snail is Venezuela.
