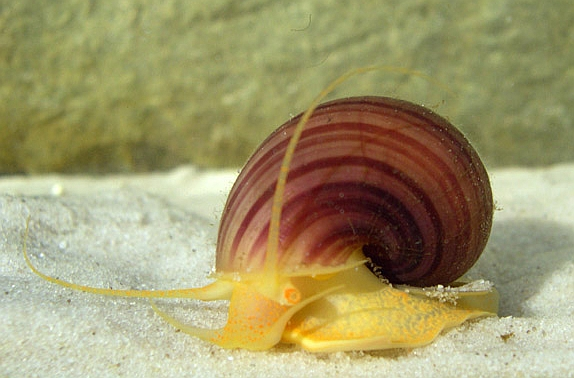
- Pomacea bridgesii in aquarium

Conservation status
- Least Concern (IUCN 3.1)

- Secure (NatureServe)

Scientific classification
- Kingdom: Animalia
- Phylum: Mollusca
- Class: Gastropoda
- Subclass: Caenogastropoda
- Order: Architaenioglossa
- Family: Ampullariidae
- Genus: Pomacea
- Species: P. bridgesii

Binomial name
- Pomacea bridgesii (Reeve, 1856)

= Pomacea bridgesii =

Species of gastropod

Pomacea bridgesii, common name the gold Inca snail, spike-topped apple snail or mystery snail, is a South American species of freshwater snail with gills and an operculum, an aquatic gastropod mollusk in the family Ampullariidae. These snails were most probably introduced to the United States through the aquarium trade.

== Subspecies ==
- Pomacea bridgesii bridgesii (Reeve, 1856)
- Pomacea bridgesii diffusa (Blume, 1957)

== Anatomy ==
Juvenile

Mystery snails possess structurally complex eyes at the tip of a cephalic eyestalk. They are able to regenerate the eye completely after amputation through the mid-eyestalk. They are born with both gills and lungs. Mystery snails also possess a siphon which is a small tube used to breathe air. They frequently surface to breathe.

== Distribution ==
The native distribution of this snail is Bolivia, Brazil, Paraguay and Peru.

=== Non-indigenous distribution ===
This species is non-indigenous in Hawaii since 1960 (Pomacea bridgesii diffusa), southeast Asia since the 1980s, and Florida since the early 1980s (Pomacea bridgesii diffusa).

== Offspring ==
Most mystery snails lay their eggs above the water line. They are gonochoristic which means a male and female must be present for reproduction. The eggs take 2–4 weeks to hatch. The snails can produce as many as two hundred offspring from one egg-laying event. Sometimes not all the eggs are fertilized so they do not all hatch. When they do hatch, the hatchlings run the risk of being eaten if they share an aquarium with fish. Egg clutches are typically deposited above the water surface rather than underwater. In aquaria, females commonly attach eggs to glass walls, lids, driftwood, or emergent vegetation.

== Environment ==
Mystery snails are often found in lakes or rivers, where the oxygen levels are low, and are equipped with both an air tube and lung, as well as a gill, allowing them to easily breathe and take in the proper oxygen needed for survival. Pomacea bridgesii are mainly found in tropical environments and unable to sustain conditions under 50 °F (10 °C).

== See also ==
- Algae eater
