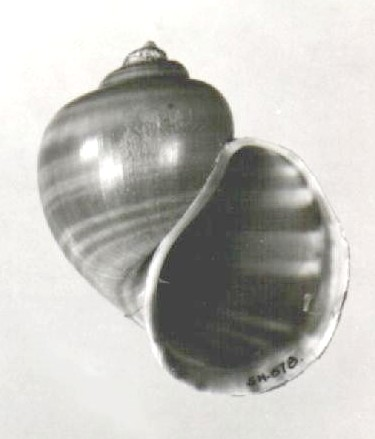
- The shell of Pomacea doliodes

Scientific classification
- Kingdom: Animalia
- Phylum: Mollusca
- Class: Gastropoda
- Subclass: Caenogastropoda
- Order: Architaenioglossa
- Family: Ampullariidae
- Genus: Pomacea
- Species: P. doliodes

Binomial name
- Pomacea doliodes (Reeve, 1856)

= Pomacea doliodes =

Species of gastropod

Pomacea doliodes is a species of freshwater snail, an aquatic gastropod mollusk in the family Ampullariidae, the apple snails. It belongs to kingdom Animalia, phylum Mollusca, class Gastropoda, order Architaenioglossa, family Ampullariidae, genus Pomacea .
