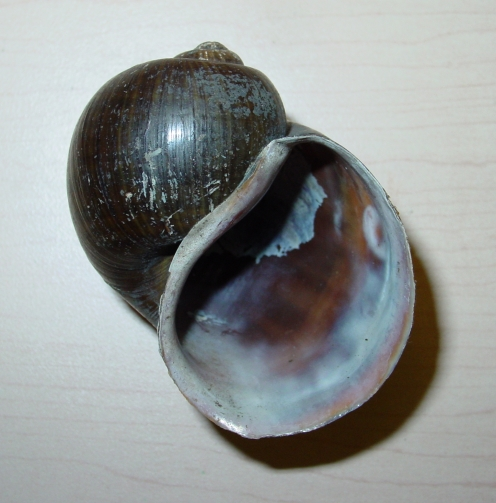
- Apertural view of a shell of Pomacea maculata
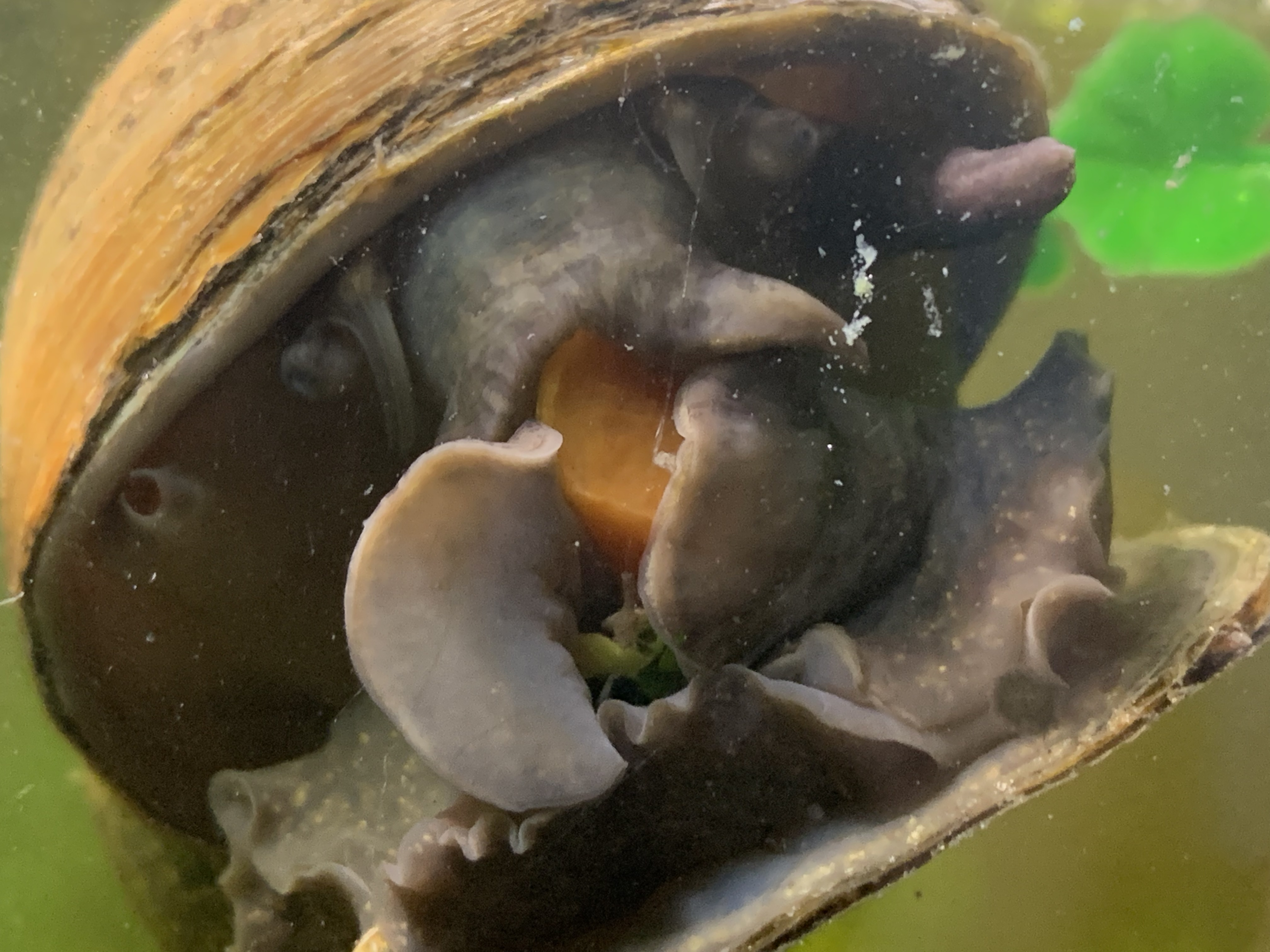
- Live Pomacea maculata floating and eating a carrot

Scientific classification
- Kingdom: Animalia
- Phylum: Mollusca
- Class: Gastropoda
- Subclass: Caenogastropoda
- Order: Architaenioglossa
- Family: Ampullariidae
- Genus: Pomacea
- Species: P. maculata

Binomial name
- Pomacea maculata Perry, 1810

Synonyms
- Island apple snail; Ampullaria gigas Spix, 1827; Ampullaria insularum d'Orbigny, 1835; Pomacea insularum (d'Orbigny, 1835); Pomacea amazonica (Reeve, 1856)

= Pomacea maculata =

Species of gastropod

Pomacea maculata is a species of large freshwater snail with an operculum, an aquatic gastropod mollusk in the family Ampullariidae, the apple snails.

The common name of its synonymous name Pomacea insularum is the island apple snail.

Together with Pomacea canaliculata it is the most invasive species of the family Ampullariidae. It is considered as about the 58th worst alien species in Europe.

== Distribution ==
The indigenous distribution of Pomacea maculata is South America. Pomacea maculata is reported from Argentina, Brazil, and Bolivia and it probably occurs in Uruguay and Paraguay.

The type locality is the Río Paraná, which joins the Río Uruguay just above Buenos Aires, forming the Río de la Plata. The area between the Paraná and the Uruguay is the Argentine province of Entre Ríos, the southern part of which is marshy, with channels connecting the Paraná and the Uruguay.

=== Non-indigenous distribution ===
==== North America ====
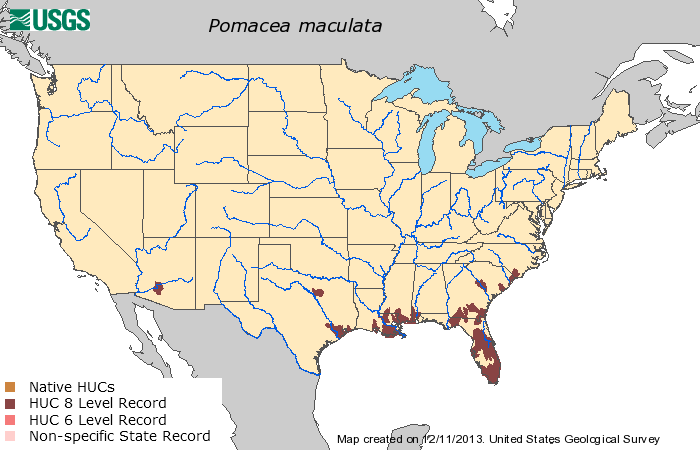
Non-native distribution of Pomacea maculata in the Southeastern United States

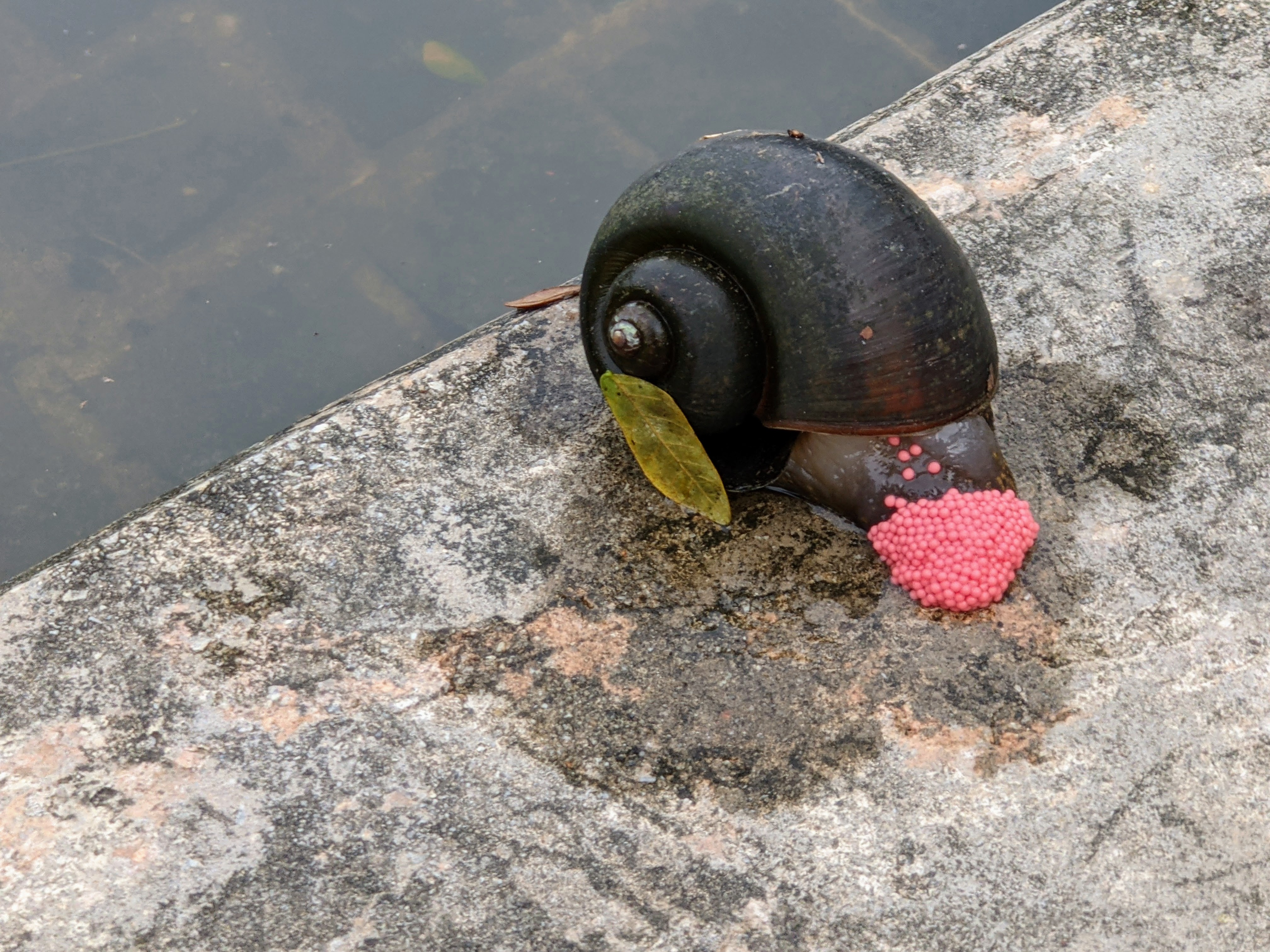
P. maculata laying eggs near the Kallang River in Singapore, where it is an invasive species.

The initial introductions in the United States were probably from aquarium release, aka "aquarium dumping", in Texas and Florida most likely in the early 1990s, but possibly as late as 2002. Since then, it has rapidly spread from its initial introduced populations in Texas and Florida, and Pomacea maculata has been documented throughout at least 10 different states as of 2024:

- American Canal and Mustang Bayou in Fort Bend County and Brazoria County, Texas,
- in 2006 in Verret Canal in Gretna, Louisiana.
- The Pascagoula and Pearl River, Mississippi
- Spring Hill Lake near Mobile, Alabama;
- Alabaha River in Georgia;
- Lake Munson, Lake Jackson, Lake Brantley, and many other locations in Florida;
- Waccamaw River, Cooper River, and Lake Marion, South Carolina
- Lumber River, North Carolina
- In October 2019 on the San Antonio Riverwalk, San Antonio, Texas
- Agua Fria and the Salt River, Arizona
- Eastern and southern Puerto Rico

Established populations exist in Florida, Georgia, and Texas.

In Florida, Georgia, and Texas, initially the occurrences of Pomacea maculata were incorrectly identified as Pomacea canaliculata. Subsequent genetic testing identified the specimens collected in Florida, Georgia, and Texas as Pomacea maculata.

Byers et al. (2013) predicted potential range of this species in the Southeastern United States. They indicated that the minimum temperature in the coldest months and maximum amount of precipitation in the warmest months are the best predictors.

==== Asia ====
In Taiwan, where golden apple snails were introduced in Asia, Pomacea maculata may be misidentified as Pomacea canaliculata. Pomacea maculata is also widespread in Singapore.

==== Europe ====
In Europe, the only recorded outbreak of the wild Pomacea maculata is in northeastern Spain, in the Ebro Delta (Catalonia), where the species was first discovered in 2009.. It is believed that the snail entered natural waters from an aquarium breeding facility.

The snail has caused significant ecological and economic damage by consuming renewable rice crops en masse and destroying native aquatic vegetation.. The discovery of P. maculata in Spain led the European Union in 2012 to impose a complete ban on the import and distribution of all molluscs of the genus Pomacea within the EU.

== Description ==
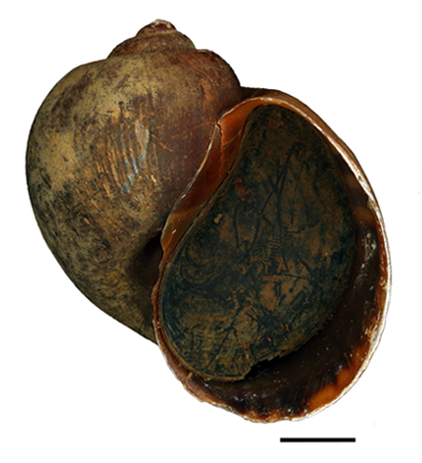
Pomacea maculata shell including an operculum.

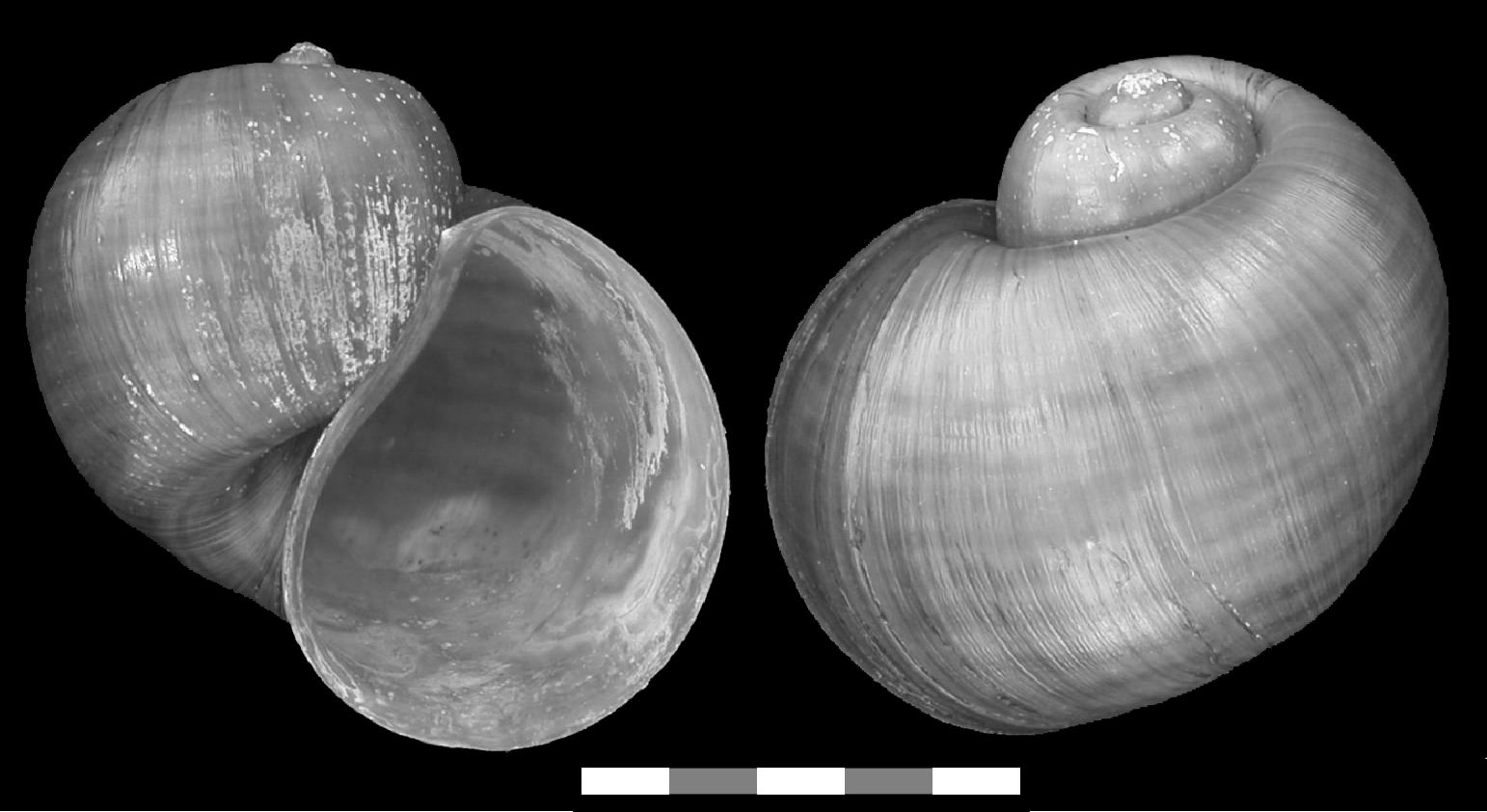
Two views of a shells of Pomacea maculata. Scale bar is 5 cm.

This snail species was described by Georges Perry in March 1810. Perry also created the genus Pomacea, and Pomacea maculata was described as the type of species.

The snail can grow up to 15 centimeters (5.9 inches) in size. The eyes are just below the antennae. The colour of the shell varies from a pale olive green to a darker green, with dark bands across the shell. The shell is quite thin compared to other family members of the apple snail family. The inside has dark spots (maculata means spotted or stained).

The shells of these applesnails are globular in shape. The shells average 5 - 6 whorls and coil dextrally. The size of the shell is up to 150 mm (5.9 inches) in length.

Normal coloration typically includes bands of brown, black, and yellowish-tan. Shells also tend to have a yellow to reddish orange coloring along the lip of the large opening. Color patterns are however extremely variable, and both albino and gold color variations exist.

The operculum of Pomacea maculata is dark brown in color and can be used to differentiate male and female snails. A female Pomacea maculata will have an operculum with uniform concavity, while the operculum in males has uneven concavity.

Pomacea maculata individuals can be difficult to differentiate morphologically from Pomacea canaliculata (but egg masses are strikingly different to a trained observer). The easiest way to distinguish the egg clutches is by the number of eggs with, P. maculata having a noticeably larger number in an individual clutch.

The color of the visible soft parts is grey-brown with dark spots.

== Ecology ==
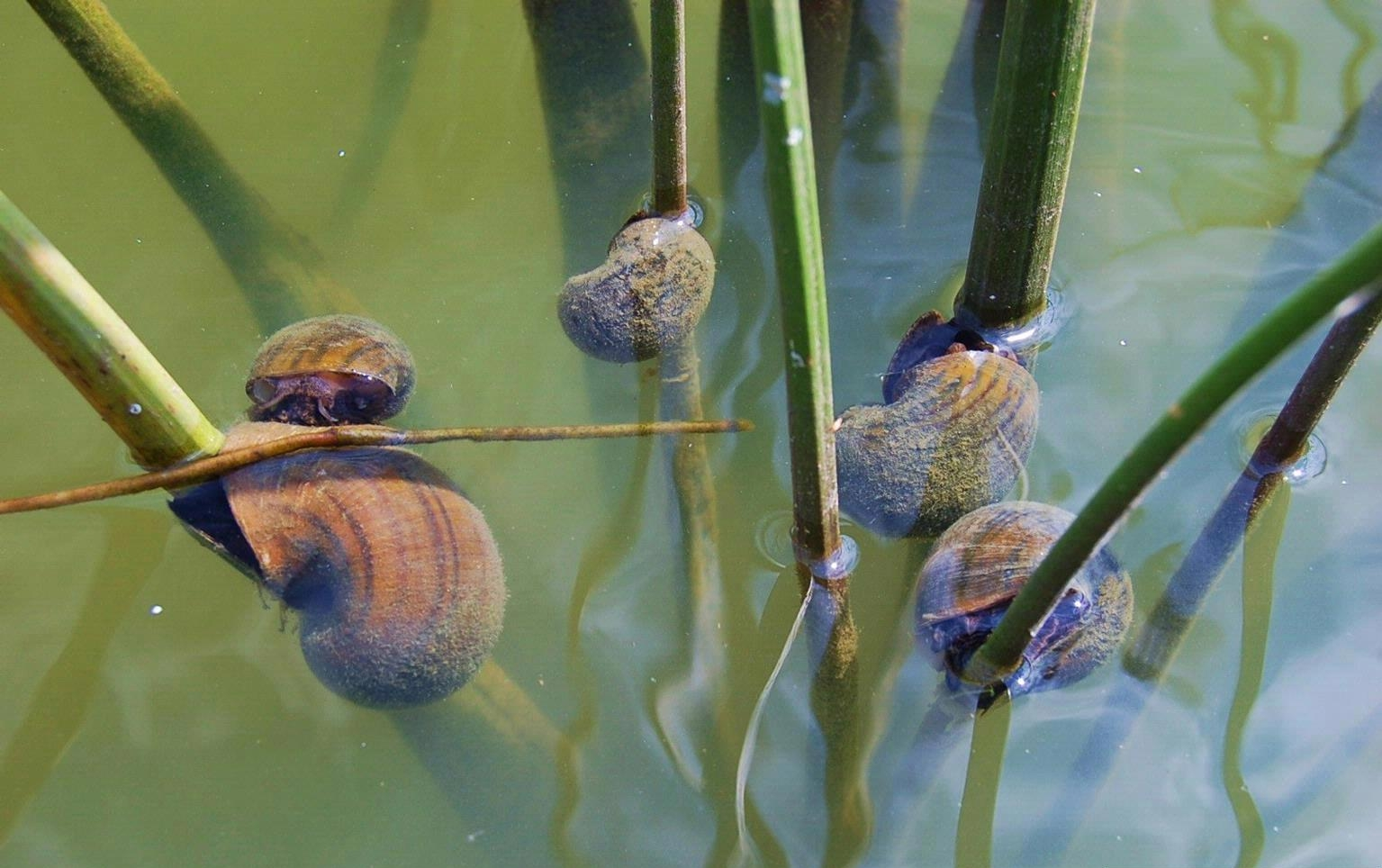
Freshwater habitat with Pomacea maculata

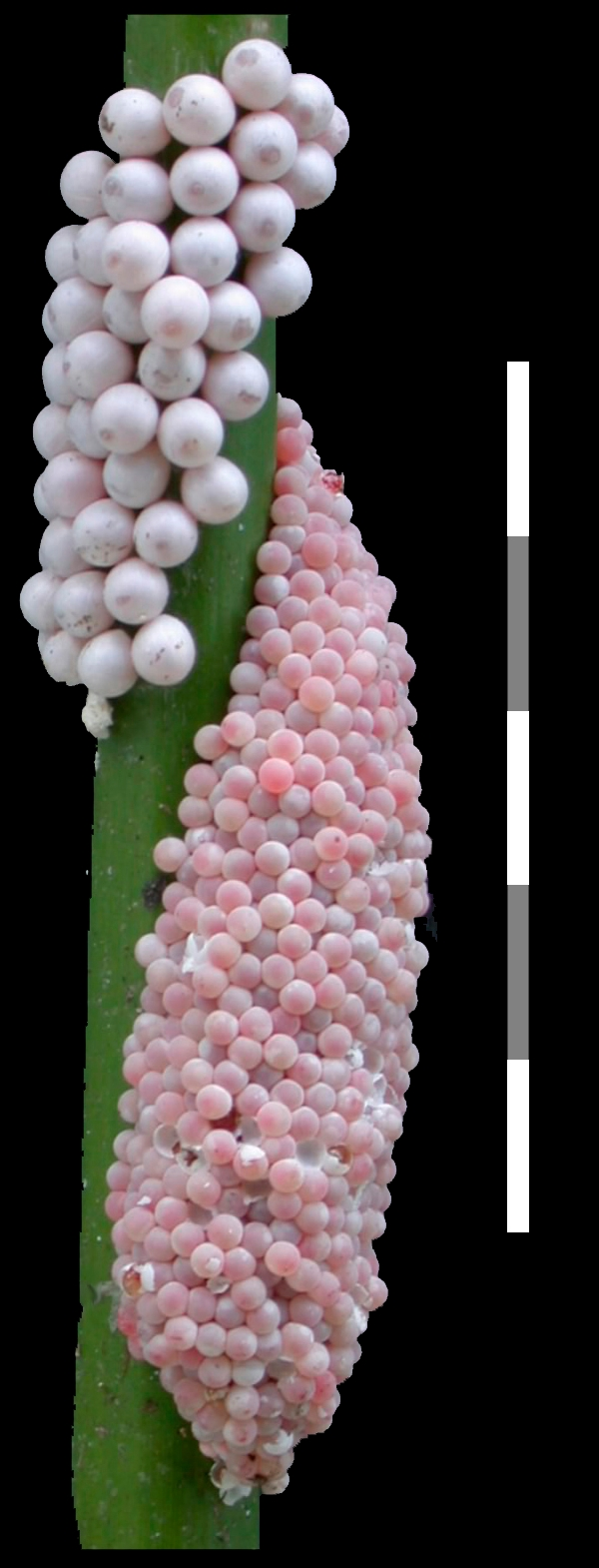
Eggs of Pomacea maculata at the bottom of the image. Eggs of Pomacea paludosa at the top. Scale bar 5 cm

=== Habitat ===
Pomacea maculata is found along the edges of freshwater bodies of water such as lakes, ponds, and wetlands. Pomacea maculata also commonly colonizes small water bodies, such as roadside ditches and can colonize the littoral edges littoral edges of larger water bodies.

Experimentally determined incipient physiological tolerance limits under laboratory conditions for adult and juvenile Pomacea maculata collected in Texas are:

- salinity: from 0.0 ‰ to 6.8-10.2 ‰
- pH: from 3.5-4.0 to 10.0-10.5
- temperature: 15.23 °C - 36.6 °C. It is also possible that the snails have behavioral mechanisms to tolerate low temperatures, such as burrowing, which could not be exhibited in laboratory experiments.
- emersion: from 70 days at 30 °C (<5% relative humidity) to >308 days at 20-25 °C (>75% relative humidity)

== Life cycle ==
=== Reproduction ===
Pomacea maculata displays sexual dimorphism, females tend to be larger than males. The females are capable of producing a full clutch of eggs within their first year of life. Pomacea maculata reproduces sexually and eggs are internally fertilized. Females can store sperm meaning that multiple clutches can result from one mating event.

This snail lays pink eggs in clutches above the water level. Pomacea maculata egg clutches contain anywhere between 1500-2100 eggs. One individual can lay up to 56,000 eggs over its lifespan. The eggs are a very saturated bight pink when first laid. Over time, while they dry out they become ashy which makes them a less saturated color. As the eggs hatch they turn white. These eggs are laid just above the waterline on vegetation or rocky surfaces. Prolonged submergence in water can damage the eggs and cause them to die. Once the eggs are laid, it typically takes 10-14 days for the entire clutch to hatch.

=== Feeding habits ===
Pomacea maculata voraciously consumes aquatic vegetation. The snail's extensive consumption of aquatic vegetation and ability to accumulate and transmit algal toxins through the food web heighten concerns about its spread.

It has been observed in laboratory settings that Pomacea maculata will consume frog eggs.

The snail eats dead and decaying plant matter and algae.

=== Impact ===
The limited ecological data on Pomacea maculata in the USA show that the species has considerable impacts, especially on native aquatic vegetation and snail species.

Pomacea maculata has strongly established itself within Florida and is out competing Florida's native snail Pomacea paludosa. This is due to Pomacea maculata's notably larger size, longer lifespan, and ability to reproduce more quickly with much larger clutch sizes. Pomacea maculata also impacts species that feed primarily on Florida's native apple snail, Pomacea paludosa, such as the endangered snail kite. These predatory birds are less equipped to capture and consume the much larger non-native snails.

Pomacea maculata have been described as voracious generalized consumers and are a concern for native plant species and environments in places where the concentrations of Pomacea maculata are high. This environmental impact has been observed in lakes where apple snail predation was occurring, these lakes have shifted to have a higher turbidity.

Pomacea maculata is an agricultural pest in crayfish and rice crop production.

Recent laboratory studies have demonstrated that Pomacea maculata can transfer the neurotoxin linked to Avian Vacuolar Myelinopathy (AVM) to its avian predators.

Pomacea maculata serves as a host species for Angiostrongylus cantonensis, also known as rat lungworm. The rat lungworm parasite has been detected infecting Pomacea maculata in Louisiana, Texas, Mississippi, and Florida.

== Human use ==
Pomacea maculata is edible and part of the ornamental pet trade for freshwater aquaria. Pomacea maculata are often sold in the aquarium trade mislabeled with indiscreet and incorrect names.

Research has been conducted exploring the capability of Pomacea maculata as a biomonitoring species. These snails accumulate heavy metals in their operculum, the operculum can be analyzed to detect toxic metals present in that environment.
