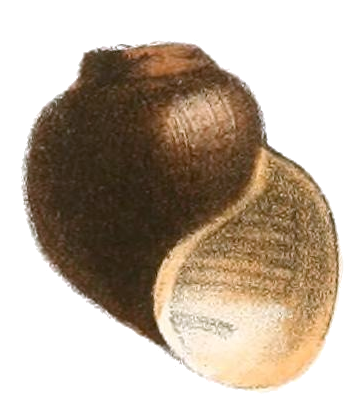
- A drawing of an apertural view of the shell of Afropomus balanoideus

Conservation status
- Endangered (IUCN 3.1)

Scientific classification
- Kingdom: Animalia
- Phylum: Mollusca
- Class: Gastropoda
- Subclass: Caenogastropoda
- Order: Architaenioglossa
- Family: Ampullariidae
- Subfamily: Ampullariinae
- Genus: Afropomus; Pilsbry & Bequaert, 1927
- Species: A. balanoideus

Binomial name
- Afropomus balanoideus (Gould, 1850)

Synonyms
- Ampullaria balanoidea Gould, 1850; Afropomus balanoidea (Gould, 1850)

= Afropomus =

Genus of gastropods

Afropomus balanoideus is a species of freshwater snail, an aquatic gastropod mollusc in the family Ampullariidae (apple snails). It is the only species in the genus Afropomus. Afropomus is the type genus of the subfamily Afropominae.

Based on the anatomy, mainly that of the reproductive system, Afropomus appears to be a primitive genus within the Ampullariidae. This basal position of Afropomus within Ampullariidae has also been confirmed by molecular phylogeny.

== Subspecies ==
Subspecies of Afropomus balanoideus include:

- Afropomus balanoideus balanoideus (Gould, 1850)
- Afropomus balanoideus nimbae Binder, 1963 This subspecies from the Ivory Coast and Senegal has a higher spire.

== Distribution ==
The distribution of Afropomus balanoideus includes:

- Côte d'Ivoire
- Liberia
- Nigeria
- Sierra Leone

The type locality is Cape Mount in Liberia.

Its presence in Ghana is uncertain.

== Description ==
The shape of the shell is ovate.

The width of the shell is 20 mm. The height of the shell is 22–23 mm.

== Ecology ==
Afropomus balanoideus lives in clean water in ditches, creeks and small rivers. It requires a high concentration of oxygen.
