= Saulea =

Scientific classification
- Kingdom: Animalia
- Phylum: Mollusca
- Class: Gastropoda
- Subclass: Caenogastropoda
- Order: Architaenioglossa
- Family: Ampullariidae
- Subfamily: Ampullariinae
- Genus: Saulea; Gray, 1868

Diversity
- 2 species

Genus of gastropods

Saulea is a genus of freshwater snails with an operculum, aquatic gastropod mollusks in the family Ampullariidae, the apple snails.

Saulea is the type genus of the tribe Sauleini.

The genus Saulea is known from Africa.

== Species ==
There are two species within the genus Saulea:

- † Saulea lithoides (Pain & Beatty, 1964) - in East Africa
- Saulea vitrea (Born, 1780) - type species - in West Africa
