= Naricopsinidae =

Scientific classification
- Kingdom: Animalia
- Phylum: Mollusca
- Class: Gastropoda
- Subclass: Caenogastropoda
- Order: Architaenioglossa
- Superfamily: Ampullarioidea
- Family: †Naricopsinidae; Gründel, 2001

Family of gastropods

†Naricopsinidae was an extinct family of fossil operculate gastropod molluscs in the informal group Architaenioglossa.

This family has no subfamilies according to the taxonomy of the Gastropoda by Bouchet & Rocroi, 2005.
