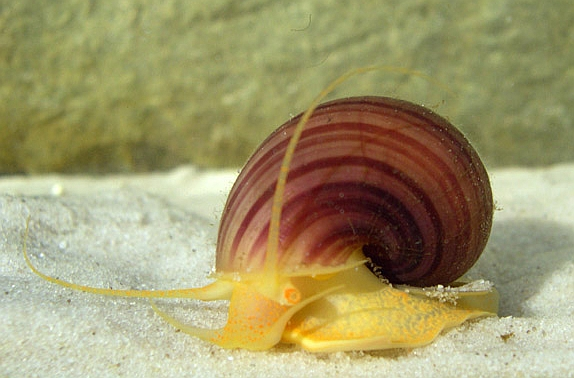
- A live individual of Pomacea bridgesii

Scientific classification
- Kingdom: Animalia
- Phylum: Mollusca
- Class: Gastropoda
- Subclass: Caenogastropoda
- Order: Architaenioglossa
- Family: Ampullariidae
- Subfamily: Pomaceinae
- Genus: Pomacea; Perry, 1810

Synonyms
- Ampullaria (Limnopomus) Dall, 1904; Ampullaria (Pomacea) Perry, 1810; Ampullarius (Effusa) Jousseaume, 1889; Ampullarius (Limnopomus) Dall, 1904; Asolene (Surinamia) Clench, 1933; Effusa Jousseaume, 1889; Limnopomus Dall, 1904; Pomacea (Effusa) Jousseaume, 1889; Pomacea (Pomacea) Perry, 1810; Pomacea (Surinamia) Clench, 1933

= Pomacea =

Genus of gastropods

Pomacea is a genus of freshwater snails with gills and an operculum, aquatic gastropod mollusks in the family Ampullariidae, the apple snails. The genus is native to the Americas; most species in this genus are restricted to South America.

In the aquarium trade these snails are sometimes called Pomacea or incorrectly Ampullarius, and in English as "[color] mystery snail" or "apple snail".

Some species have been introduced outside their native range and are considered invasive because of their voracious appetite for plants. Because of this, imports involving this genus are restricted in some regions (including the United States) and are entirely banned in others (including the EU).

== Species ==
Species in the genus Pomacea include:

subgenus Effusa Jousseaume, 1889

- Pomacea baeri (Dautzenberg, 1902)
- Pomacea glauca (Linné, 1758)
- Pomacea quinindensis (K. Miller, 1879)

subgenus Pomacea Perry, 1810

- Pomacea aldersoni (Pain, 1946)
- Pomacea auriformis (Reeve, 1856)
- Pomacea aurostoma (Lea, 1856)
- Pomacea bridgesii (Reeve, 1856)
- Pomacea camena (Pain, 1949)
- Pomacea canaliculata (Lamarck, 1819)
- Pomacea catamarcensis (Sowerby, 1874)
- Pomacea columbiensis (Philippi, 1851)
- Pomacea columellaris (Gould, 1848)
- Pomacea commissionis (Ihering, 1898)
- Pomacea cousini (Jousseaume, 1877)
- Pomacea cumingii (P. P. King & Broderip, 1831)
- Pomacea decussata (Moricand)
- Pomacea diffusa Blume, 1957
- Pomacea doliodes (Reeve, 1856)
- Pomacea eximia (Dunker, 1853)
- Pomacea falconensis Pain & Arias, 1958
- Pomacea fasciata (Roissy, 1805)
- Pomacea flagellata (Say, 1827)
- Pomacea haustrum (Reeve, 1856)
- Pomacea hollingsworthi (Pain, 1946)
- Pomacea lineata (Spix, 1827)
- Pomacea maculata Perry, 1810 - synonyms: Ampullaria gigas Spix, 1827; Pomacea insularum (D'Orbigny, 1839)
- Pomacea megastoma (Sowerby I, 1825)
- Pomacea ocanensis (Kobelt, 1914)
- Pomacea occulta (Q.-Q. Yang & X.-P. Yu, 2019)
- Pomacea paludosa (Say, 1829)
- Pomacea papyracea (Spix, 1827)
- Pomacea pealiana (Lea, 1838)
- Pomacea poeyana (Pilsbry, 1927)
- Pomacea prunella (Hupé, 1857)
- Pomacea reyrei (Cousin, 1887)
- Pomacea scalaris (D'Orbigny, 1835)
- Pomacea sinamarina (Bruguière, 1792)
- Pomacea urceus (Müller, 1774)
- Pomacea vexillum (Reeve, 1856)
- Pomacea zischkai (Blume & Pain, 1952)

== As invasive species ==
Because of the potential to destroy aquatic and marsh vegetation in the wild, the European Union has banned all imports of snails from the family Ampullariidae, which includes the genus Pomacea.

Similarly, the United States prohibits all members of Ampullariidae except one from being imported or transported interstate, except with a permit for the purposes of research. The sole exception to this is Pomacea diffusa (formerly P. bridgesii) as it is not known to be an agricultural pest.
