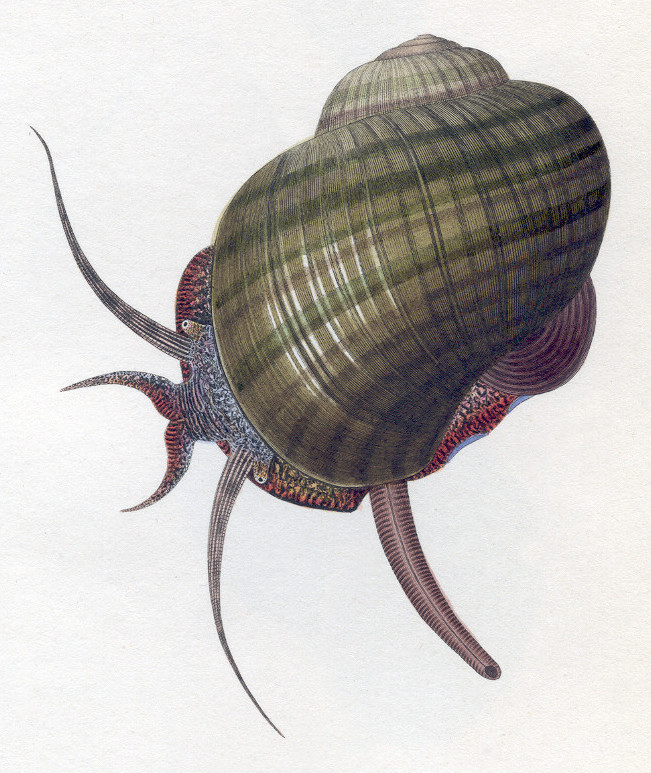
- Colored engraving of a live Pomacea paludosa made by Helen Lawson († 1854) and published in 1845 A monograph of the freshwater univalve Mollusca of the United States: including notices of species in other parts of North America by Samuel Stehman Haldeman.

Conservation status
- Least Concern (IUCN 3.1)

- Secure (NatureServe)

Scientific classification
- Kingdom: Animalia
- Phylum: Mollusca
- Class: Gastropoda
- Subclass: Caenogastropoda
- Order: Architaenioglossa
- Family: Ampullariidae
- Genus: Pomacea
- Species: P. paludosa

Binomial name
- Pomacea paludosa (Say, 1829)

Synonyms
- Ampullaria caliginosa Reeve, 1856; Ampullaria depressa Say, 1824 (invalid: junior homonym of Ampullaria depressa Lamarck, 1804; A. paludosa is a replacement name); Ampullaria hopetonensis I. Lea, 1834; Ampullaria miamiensis Pilsbry, 1899; Ampullaria paludosa Say, 1829 (original combination); Ampullaria pinei Dall, 1898 (junior synonym); Pomacea (Pomacea) paludosa (Say, 1829) · accepted, alternate representation; Pomacea paludosa flava M. Smith, 1937

= Pomacea paludosa =

Pomacea paludosa Temporal range: Pliocene-present

Species of gastropod

Pomacea paludosa, common name the Florida applesnail, is a species of freshwater snail with an operculum, an aquatic gastropod mollusk in the family Ampullariidae, the apple snails.

== Shell description ==
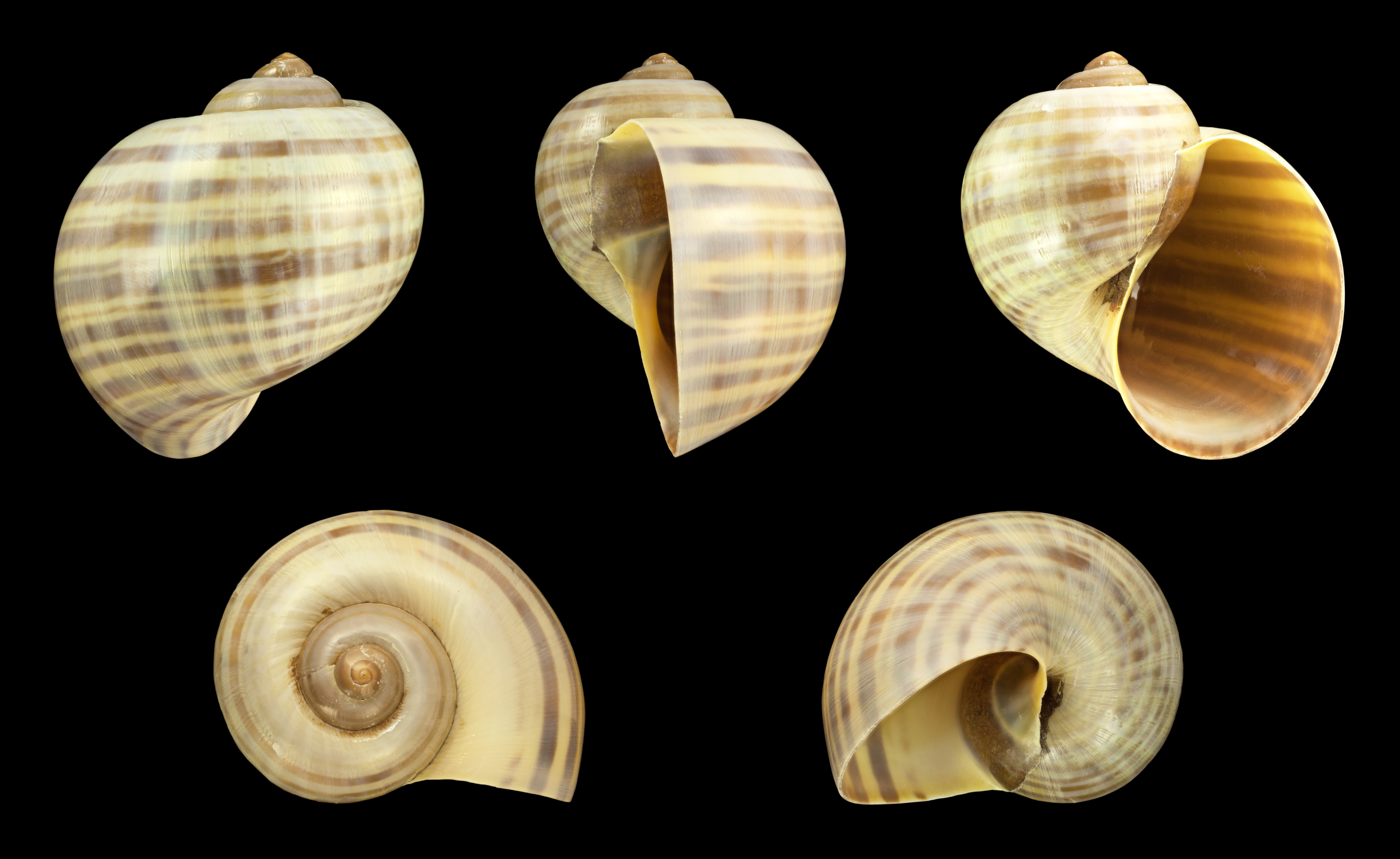
Five views of a shell of Pomacea paludosa

This species is the largest freshwater gastropod native to North America.

The shell is globose in shape. The whorls are wide, the spire is depressed, and the aperture is narrowly oval. The shells are brown in color, and have a pattern of stripes.

The shell is 60 millimetres (2.4 in) in both length and width.

== Distribution ==
The indigenous distribution of this snail is central and southern Florida, Cuba and Hispaniola.

The nonindigenous distribution includes northern Florida. The species has also been found in Georgia, Oahu, Hawaii (Devick 1991), Louisiana, and Oklahoma.

== Ecology ==
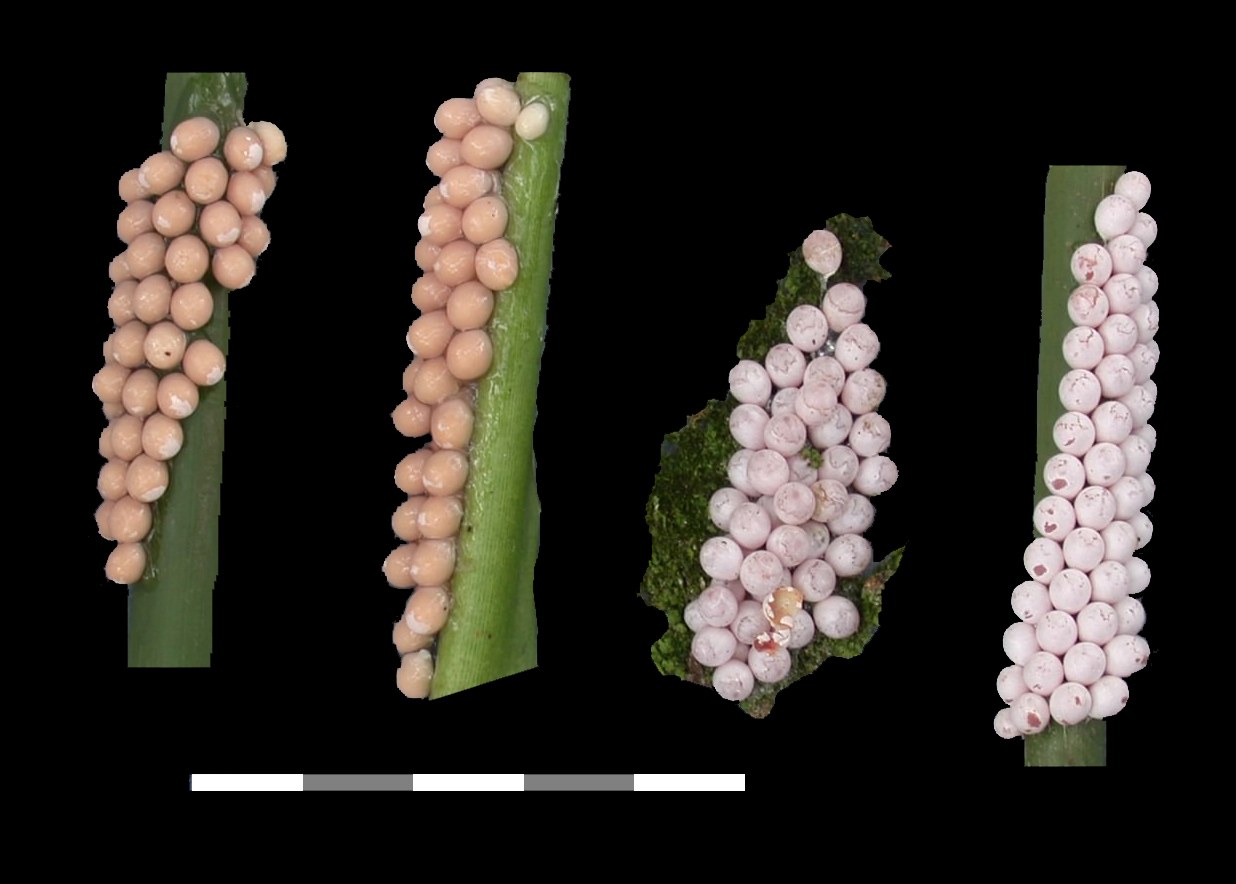
The maturation of eggs of Pomacea paludosa: freshly laid eggs in a thick mucus matrix have a salmon coloration (left). Mature eggs in calcified shells are pinkish white in color (right).

This is a tropical species. It is amphibious, and can survive in water bodies that dry out during the dry season.

Applesnails have both gills and lungs.
