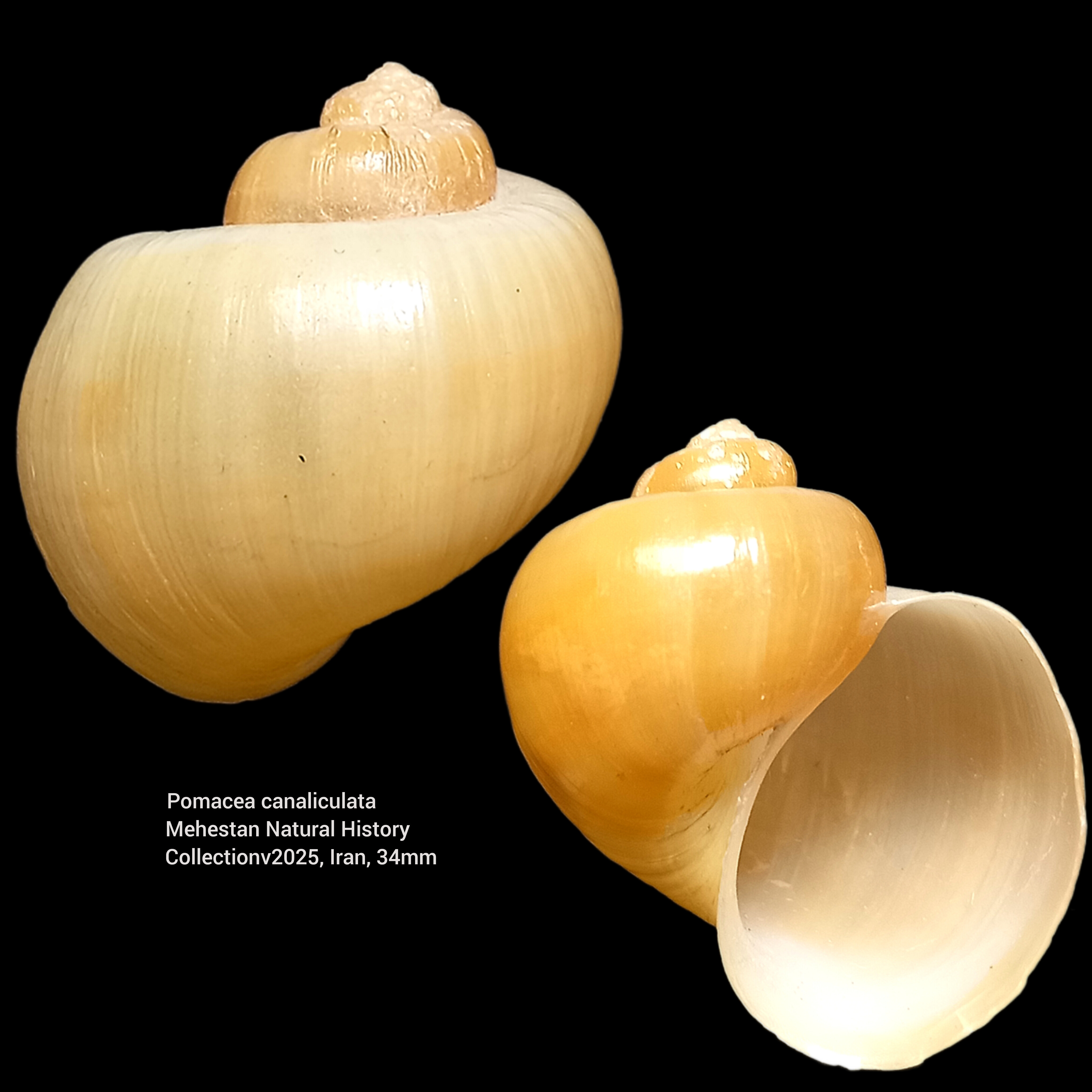
- Golden apple snail Pomacea canaliculata

Scientific classification
- Domain: Eukaryota
- Kingdom: Animalia
- Phylum: Mollusca
- Class: Gastropoda
- Subclass: Caenogastropoda
- Order: Architaenioglossa
- Superfamily: Ampullarioidea; Gray, 1824

Families
- Family Ampullariidae; † Family Naricopsinidae

= Ampullarioidea =

Superfamily of gastropods

Ampullarioidea is a taxonomic superfamily of freshwater snails, aquatic gastropod mollusks within the informal group Architaenioglossa, which belongs to the clade Caenogastropoda (unassigned).

== Families ==
- Ampullariidae Gray, 1824
- † Naricopsinidae Gründel, 2001

Family brought into synonymy

- Pilidae Preston, 1915: synonym of Ampullariidae Gray, 1824
