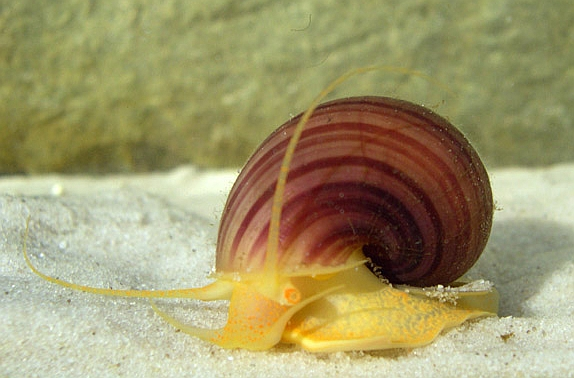
- Spike-topped apple snail Pomacea bridgesii

Scientific classification
- Kingdom: Animalia
- Phylum: Mollusca
- Class: Gastropoda
- Subclass: Caenogastropoda
- Order: Architaenioglossa
- Superfamily: Ampullarioidea
- Family: Ampullariidae; J.E. Gray, 1824

Diversity
- 105–170 species

Synonyms
- Pilidae Preston, 1915; Sauleini Berthold, 1991

= Apple snail =

Ampullariidae Apple snail Temporal range: 160 Mya-Recent

Family of gastropods

Ampullariidae (commonly known as apple snails), is a family of large freshwater snails that includes the mystery snail species. They present an operculum and simultaneously have a gill and a lung as respiratory structures, which are separated by a division of the mantle cavity. This adaptation allows these animals to be amphibious. Species in this family are considered gonochoristic, meaning that each individual is either male or female.

== Systematics and taxonomy ==
Ampullariidae belongs to the superfamily Ampullarioidea and is also its type family. According to the current classification accepted by WoRMS, it comprises two well-established subfamilies: Ampullariinae (5 genera) and Pomaceinae (4 genera). The six extinct genera of Ampullariidae still have an undefined position within the family (Ampullariidae incertae sedis, meaning "of uncertain placement") as of 2026. The sister group of Ampullariidae has not yet been clearly identified as of 2009.

=== Genera ===
The following cladogram proposed by Jørgensen and colleagues in 2008 shows phylogenic relations of 6 genera belonging to Ampullariidae:

- Ampullariidae
  - Afropomus
  - - - Pila
      - Lanistes
    - - Saulea
      - - Marisa
        - Pomacea

The following are the nine extant genera and 6 extinct genera (marked with a dagger †) of Ampullariidae:

==== Extant genera ====
===== Subfamily Ampullariinae =====
- Genus Afropomus Pilsbry & Bequaert, 1927
- Genus Forbesopomus Bequaert & Clench, 1937
- Genus Lanistes Montfort, 1810
- Genus Pila Röding, 1798 – the valid synonym of Ampullaria Lamarck, 1799, which is the type genus of the subfamily Ampullariinae.
- Genus Saulea Gray, 1868

===== Subfamily Pomaceinae =====
- Genus Asolene A. d'Orbigny, 1838
- Genus Felipponea Dall, 1919
- Genus Marisa J. E. Gray, 1824
- Genus Pomacea Perry, 1810

==== Extinct genera (Ampullariidae incertae sedis) ====
- † Genus Carnevalea Harzhauser & Neubauer, 2016
- † Genus Doriaca Willmann, 1981
- † Genus Euphepyrgula G.-X. Zhu, 1980
- † Genus Mesolanistes Yen, 1945
- † Genus Pseudoceratodes Wenz, 1928
- † Genus Sudanistes Harzhauser & Neubauer, 2017

Genera brought into synonymy

- Effusa Jousseaume, 1889: synonym of Pomacea Perry, 1810 (junior synonym)
- Pomella Gray, 1847: synonym of Pomacea Perry, 1810
- Ampullaria Lamarck, 1799: synonym of Pila Röding, 1798
- Ampullarius Montfort, 1810: synonym of Pila Röding, 1798 (invalid: unjustified emendation of Ampullaria)
- Ampulloidea d'Orbigny, 1841: synonym of Asolene d'Orbigny, 1838 (unnecessary substitute name for Asolene)
- † Ampullopsis Repelin, 1902 : synonym of Pila Röding, 1798 (junior subjective synonym)
- Ceratodes Guilding, 1828: synonym of Marisa (gastropod) Gray, 1824 (junior objective synonym of Marisa)
- Subfamily Lanistinae Starobogatov, 1983: synonym of Ampullariidae Gray, 1824
- Leroya Grandidier, 1887: synonym of Lanistes Montfort, 1810
- Limnopomus Dall, 1904: synonym of Pomacea Perry, 1810
- Meladomus Swainson, 1840: synonym of Lanistes Montfort, 1810
- Pachychilus Philippi, 1851: synonym of Pila Röding, 1798 (unjustified emendation of Pachylabra)
- Pachylabra Swainson, 1840: synonym of Pila Röding, 1798 (unnecessary nom. nov. pro Pachystoma Guilding, 1828)
- Pachystoma Guilding, 1828: synonym of Pila Röding, 1798
- Pomus Gray, 1847: synonym of Pila Röding, 1798
- Tribe Sauleini Berthold, 1991: synonym of Ampullariidae Gray, 1824
- Turbinicola Annandale & Prashad, 1921: synonym of Pila Röding, 1798

== Origin and distribution ==
Ampullariidae are probably of Gondwanan origin, and the diversification of Ampullariidae probably started after the separation of the African and South American continental plates. The genera Asolene, Felipponea, Marisa, and Pomacea are New World genera that are native to South America, Central America, the West Indies and the Southern United States. The genera Afropomus, Lanistes, and Saulea are found in Africa. The genus Pila is native to both Africa and Asia.

== Ecology ==
Apple snails are exceptionally well adapted to tropical regions characterized by periods of drought alternating with periods of high rainfall. This adaptation is reflected in their life style; they are moderately amphibious. They have an operculum which enables the snail to seal the shell entrance to prevent drying out while they are buried in the mud during dry periods.

One of the more typical adaptations of apple snails is branchial respiration. The snail has a system comparable to the gills of a fish (at the right side of the snail body) to breathe under water as well as a lung (at the left side of the body) to respire air. This lung/gill combination expands the action radius of the snail in search for food. Many species in this family are filter feeders that use a specialized mucus net to trap phytoplankton and detritus from the water column, consuming the particles suspended in the water.

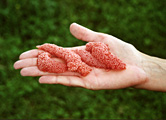
Pomacea canaliculata egg clusters

Several apple snail genera (Pomacea, Pila and Asolene/Pomella) deposit eggs above the waterline in calcareous clutches that can be recognized by their light pink color. This strategy protects the eggs against predation by fish and other aquatic inhabitants. Another anti-predator adaptation in the apple snail genera Pomacea and Pila is the tubular siphon, used to breathe air while submerged, reducing vulnerability to attacking birds. The apple snail's usual enemies are the birds limpkin and snail kite.

Apple snails inhabit various ecosystems: ponds, swamps and rivers. Although they occasionally leave the water, they spend most of their time under water. Unlike the pulmonate snail families, apple snails are not hermaphroditic, but gonochoristic; i.e. they have separate sexes.

== Human use ==
=== As a common aquarium animal ===
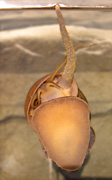
Pomacea canaliculata with extended siphon.

Apple snails are popular aquarium pets because of their attractive appearance and size. When properly cared for, some apple snail species can reach 15 cm (5.9 in) diameter. Apple snails include species that are the biggest living freshwater snails on Earth.

The most common apple snail in aquarium shops are Pomacea bridgesii and Pomacea diffusa, (both called mystery snails or spike-topped apple snails, among other things). These species come in different colours from brown to albino or yellow and even blue, purple, pink, and jade, with or without banding. Another common apple snail is Pomacea canaliculata; this snail is bigger, rounder and is more likely to eat aquatic plants, which makes it less suitable for most aquaria. This species can also have different shell and body colours. The "giant ramshorn snail" (Marisa cornuarietis) although not always recognized as an apple snail due to its discoidal shape, is also a popular aquatic pet. Occasionally, the Florida apple snail (Pomacea paludosa) is found in the aquarium trade and these are often collected in the wild from ditches and ponds in Florida. The giant Pomacea maculata is rarely used as an aquarium species.

Apple snails are often sold under the name "golden (ivory, blue, black...) mystery snail" and they are given incorrect names like Ampullarius for the genus instead of Pomacea and wrong species names like gigas instead of maculata.

==== Temperature ====
The optimal aquarium water temperature for apple snails is between 18 and 28 °C (64 and 82 °F). Apple snails are more active and lively in the higher part of this temperature range. In these higher temperatures, the snails tend to eat, crawl and grow faster. At the lower end of the temperature range, 18 °C or 64 °F, the snails may become inactive.

=== As a pest ===
In the 1980s, Pomacea canaliculata was introduced in Taiwan to start an escargot industry. It was thought that such food culture could provide valuable proteins for farmers, who primarily live on a rice diet. However, the snails did not become a culinary success. Additionally, the imported snails (like the native apple snail population, Pila) were able to transfer a parasite called Angiostrongylus cantonensis (rat lungworm). This parasite can infect humans if snails are eaten that have not been thoroughly cooked first.

Instead of becoming a valuable food source, the introduced snails escaped and became a serious threat to rice production and the native ecosystems. During the 1980s the introduced snails rapidly spread to Indonesia, Thailand, Cambodia, Hong Kong, southern China, Japan and the Philippines.

Hawaii experienced the same introduction of Pomacea for culinary purposes, and its taro industry is now suffering because of it.

Genera Marisa, Pila and Pomacea (except Pomacea diffusa and native Pomacea paludosa) are already established in the US, and are considered to represent a potentially serious threat as a pest which could negatively affect agriculture, human health or commerce. Therefore, it has been suggested that these genera be given top national quarantine significance in the US.

Nevertheless, apple snails are considered a delicacy in several regions of the world, and they are often sold in East and Pacific Asian markets for consumption.

=== As a bio-control agent ===
Pomacea and Marisa species have been introduced to Africa and Asia in an attempt to control other medically problematic snails in the family Planorbidae: Bulinus species and Biomphalaria species, which serve as intermediate hosts for trematoda parasites. These parasites can cause swimmers itch and schistosomiasis, a disease that affects over 200 million people in tropical regions. One of the species introduced as bio-agent is Marisa cornuarietis; this snail competes with other snails and also directly preys on other species.

=== As food ===
In Veracruz, Mexico, there is a subspecies of apple snail known as Pomacea patula catemacensis Baker, 1922. This subspecies is endemic to Lake Catemaco. This large snail is locally known as "tegogolo" and is prized as a nutritious food item, with approximately 12 grams of protein per 100 grams of apple snail flesh according to the apple snail nutritional information. They are also low in fat and high in minerals and are considered an aphrodisiac. Only wild or specifically cultured apple snails are fit for human consumption; those found in domestic aquaria may be unsuitable.
