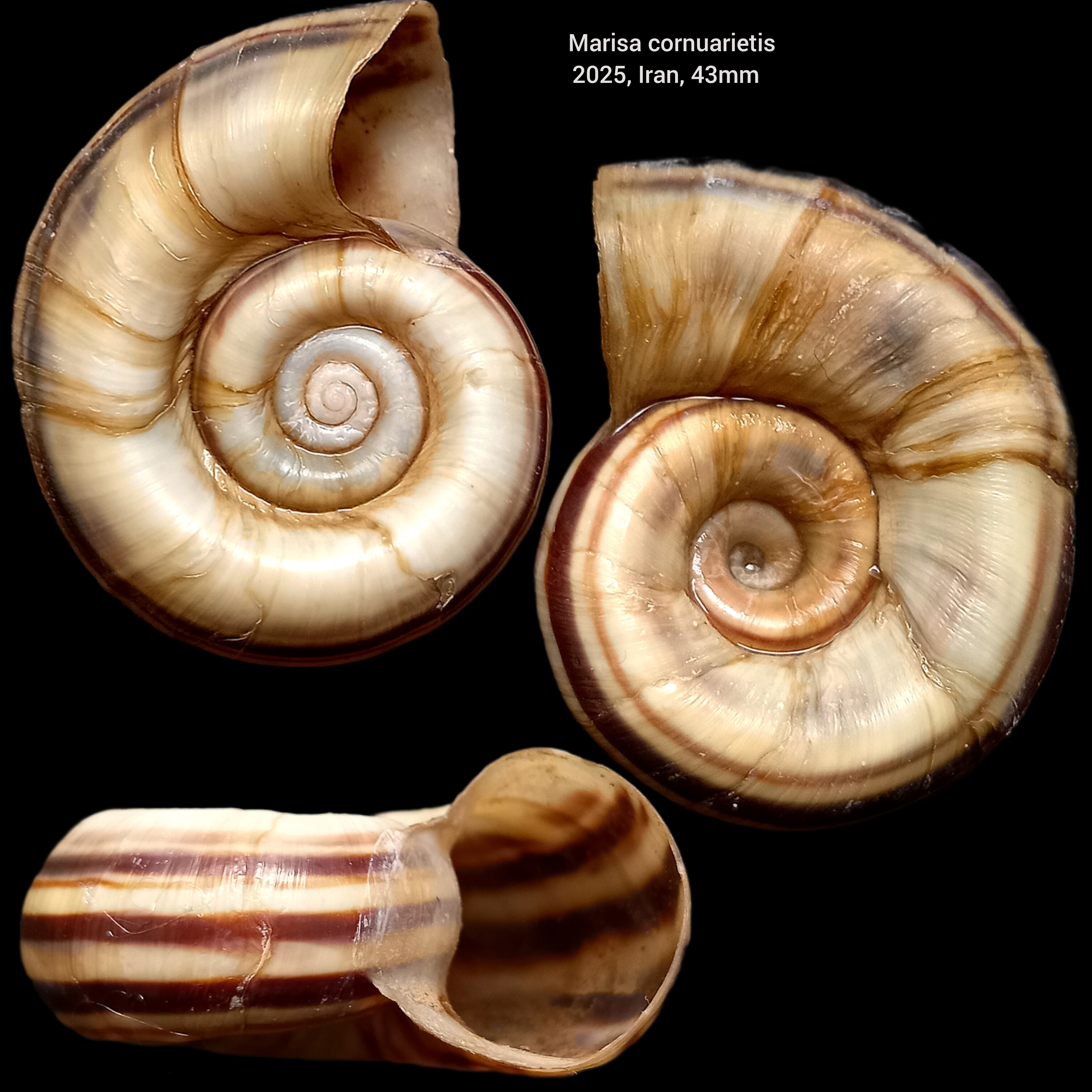
- Ramshorn apple snail Marisa cornuarietis

Scientific classification
- Domain: Eukaryota
- Kingdom: Animalia
- Phylum: Mollusca
- Class: Gastropoda
- Subclass: Caenogastropoda
- Order: Architaenioglossa; Haller, 1890

= Architaenioglossa =

Order of gastropods

Architaenioglossa is a taxonomic group of snails which have gills and often an operculum. They are primarily land and freshwater gastropod mollusks within the clade Caenogastropoda.

This "informal group" has been shown to be polyphyletic in a study by Harasewych et al., published in 1998.

== Taxonomy ==
- Superfamily Ampullarioidea
  - Family Ampullariidae
  - † Family Naricopsinidae
- Superfamily Cyclophoroidea
  - Family Cyclophoridae
  - Family Aciculidae
  - Family Craspedopomatidae
  - Family Diplommatinidae
  - † Family Ferussinidae
  - Family Maizaniidae
  - Family Megalomastomatidae
  - Family Neocyclotidae
  - Family Pupinidae
- Superfamily Viviparoidea
  - Family Viviparidae
  - † Family Pliopholygidae

(Families that are exclusively fossil are indicated with a dagger †)
