= Leiosaurus paronae =

Conservation status
- Data Deficient (IUCN 3.1)

Scientific classification
- Kingdom: Animalia
- Phylum: Chordata
- Class: Reptilia
- Order: Squamata
- Suborder: Iguania
- Family: Leiosauridae
- Genus: Leiosaurus
- Species: L. paronae

Binomial name
- Leiosaurus paronae (Peracca, 1897)

Synonyms
- Aperopristis paronae Peracca, 1897

Species of lizard

Leiosaurus paronae is a species of lizard in the family Leiosauridae. The species is endemic to Argentina.

== Etymology ==
The specific name, paronae, is in honor of Italian zoologist Corrado Parona.

== Description ==
Leiosaurus paronae is relatively long and slender. Its coloration is similar to that of Leiosaurus catamarcensis. However, L. paronae is recognizable by its reduced dorsal crest, and its weakly keeled ventral scales.

== Habitat ==
The preferred natural habitats of Leiosaurus paronae are forest and shrubland.

== Reproduction ==
Leiosaurus paronae is oviparous.

== Conseration ==
Leiosaurus paronae is threatened by habitat loss due to deforestation for timber extraction and for agricultural activities.
