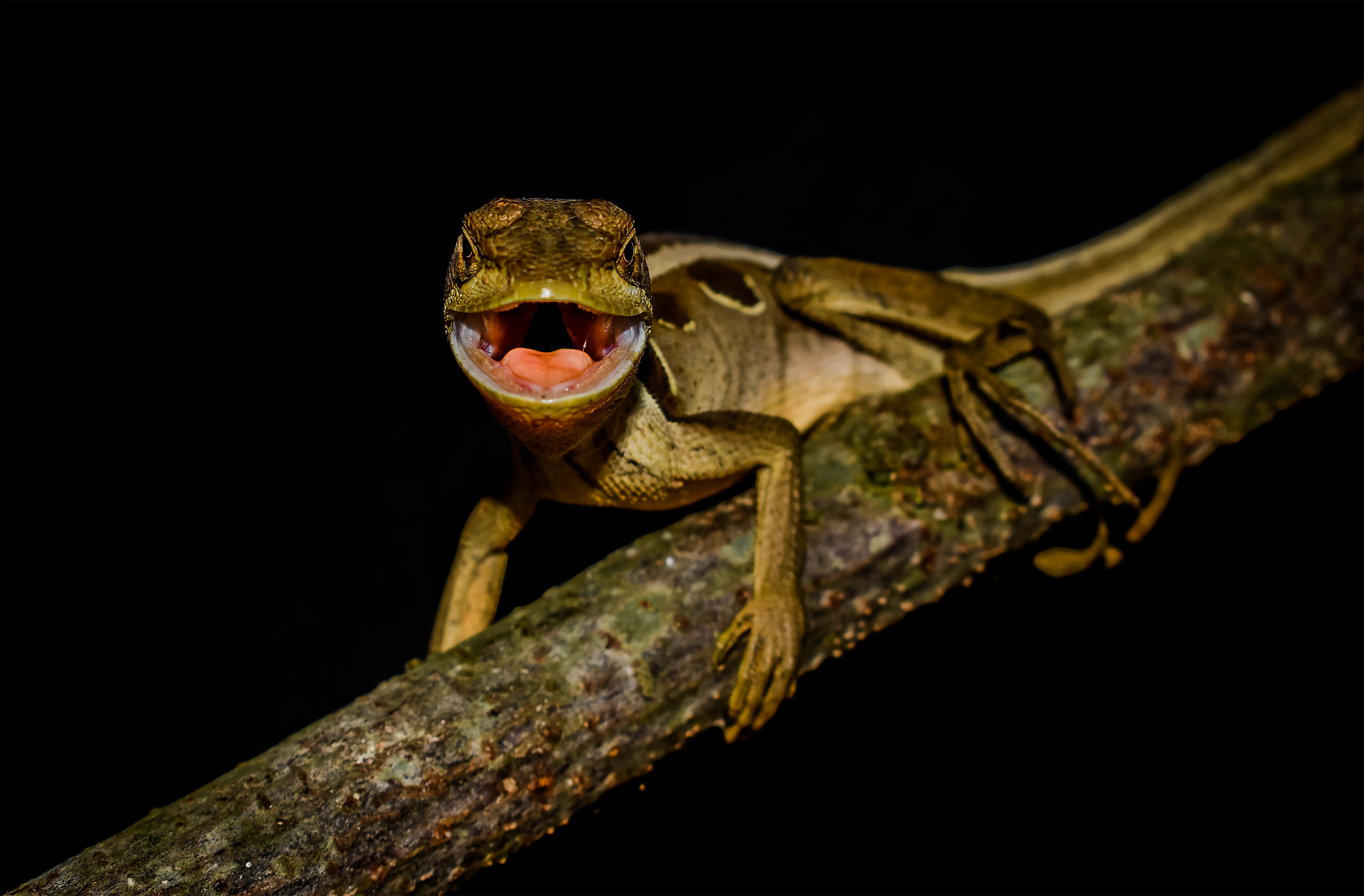

Conservation status
- Least Concern (IUCN 3.1)

Scientific classification
- Kingdom: Animalia
- Phylum: Chordata
- Class: Reptilia
- Order: Squamata
- Suborder: Iguania
- Family: Leiosauridae
- Genus: Enyalius
- Species: E. bilineatus

Binomial name
- Enyalius bilineatus (Duméril & Bibron, 1837)

= Enyalius bilineatus =

Species of lizard

Enyalius bilineatus, the two-lined fathead anole, is a species of lizard in the family Leiosauridae. It is endemic to Brazil.
