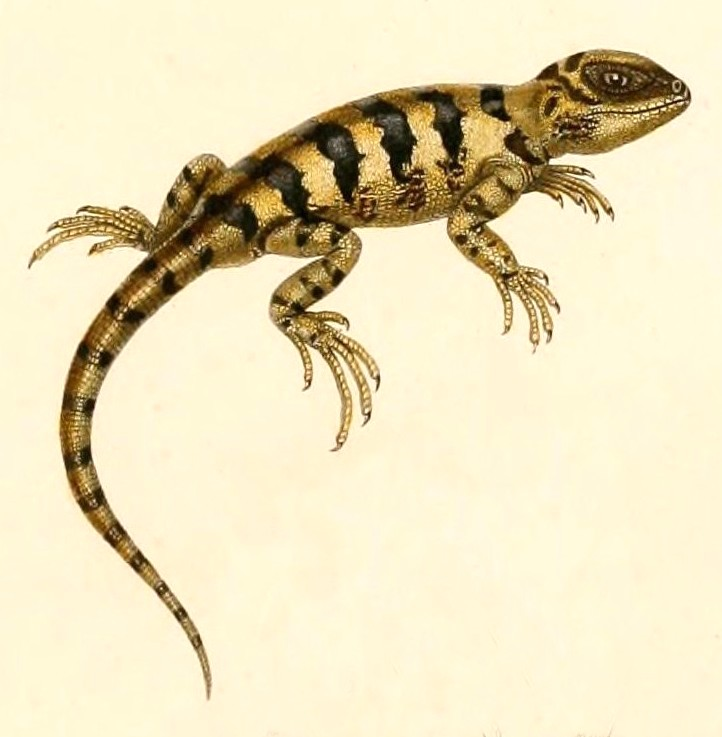

Conservation status
- Data Deficient (IUCN 3.1)

Scientific classification
- Kingdom: Animalia
- Phylum: Chordata
- Class: Reptilia
- Order: Squamata
- Suborder: Iguania
- Family: Leiosauridae
- Genus: Pristidactylus
- Species: P. fasciatus

Binomial name
- Pristidactylus fasciatus (d'Orbigny & Bibron, 1837)

Synonyms
- Leiosaurus fasciatus d'Orbigny & Bibron, 1837; Leiosaurus (Pristidactylus) fasciatus – Fitzinger, 1843; Leiosaurus (Ptenodactylus) fasciatus – Gray, 1845; Cupriguanus fasciatus (d'Orbigny & Bibron, 1837); Leiosaurus bardensis Gallardo, 1968; Cupriguanus bardensis (Gallardo, 1968)

= Pristidactylus fasciatus =

Species of lizard

Pristidactylus fasciatus, also known as d'Orbigny's banded anole, is a species of lizard endemic to Argentina.
