= Brazilian fathead anole =

There are two species of lizard named Brazilian fathead anole:

- Enyalius boulengeri, native to Brazil
- Enyalius brasiliensis, native to Brazil and Uruguay
