= Anisolepis longicauda =

Conservation status
- Vulnerable (IUCN 3.1)

Scientific classification
- Kingdom: Animalia
- Phylum: Chordata
- Class: Reptilia
- Order: Squamata
- Suborder: Iguania
- Family: Leiosauridae
- Genus: Anisolepis
- Species: A. longicauda

Binomial name
- Anisolepis longicauda (Boulenger, 1891)

Species of lizard

Anisolepis longicauda is a species of lizard in the family Leiosauridae. It is native to Brazil, Argentina, and Paraguay.
