= Pristidactylus volcanensis =

Conservation status
- Endangered (IUCN 3.1)

Scientific classification
- Kingdom: Animalia
- Phylum: Chordata
- Class: Reptilia
- Order: Squamata
- Suborder: Iguania
- Family: Leiosauridae
- Genus: Pristidactylus
- Species: P. volcanensis

Binomial name
- Pristidactylus volcanensis Lamborot & Diaz, 1987

Species of lizard

Pristidactylus volcanensis is a species of lizard in the family Leiosauridae. The species is endemic to Chile.
