= Diplolaemus leopardinus =

Conservation status
- Least Concern (IUCN 3.1)

Scientific classification
- Kingdom: Animalia
- Phylum: Chordata
- Class: Reptilia
- Order: Squamata
- Suborder: Iguania
- Family: Leiosauridae
- Genus: Diplolaemus
- Species: D. leopardinus

Binomial name
- Diplolaemus leopardinus (F. Werner, 1898)

Synonyms
- Liosaurus leopardinus F. Werner, 1898; Diplolaemus leopardinus — Donoso-Barros, 1965; Diplolaemus leopardinus — J. Peters & Donoso-Barros, 1970

Species of lizard

Diplolaemus leopardinus, commonly known as the leopard iguana or the leopard grumbler, is a species of lizard native to the southern tip of South America.

== Geographic range ==
It is found in the Patagonian Desert and in the Araucanía Region of Argentina and Chile.

== Description ==
The leopard iguana has a broad, triangular head and strong jaws. It is a medium-brown colour with bands of darker brown blotches. Its snout-to vent length (SVL) is 5 to 9 cm (2.0 to 3.5 in).

== Diet ==
Its diet mostly consists of insects and other small invertebrates.

== Habitat ==
It is found in the Lonquimay Valley, in the Araucanía Region of Chile, at elevations between 1,000 and 2,000 m (3,281 and 6,562 ft).
