= Enyalius bibronii =

Conservation status
- Least Concern (IUCN 3.1)

Scientific classification
- Kingdom: Animalia
- Phylum: Chordata
- Class: Reptilia
- Order: Squamata
- Suborder: Iguania
- Family: Leiosauridae
- Genus: Enyalius
- Species: E. bibronii

Binomial name
- Enyalius bibronii Boulenger, 1885

Species of lizard

Enyalius bibronii is a species of lizard in the family Leiosauridae. It is endemic to Brazil.
