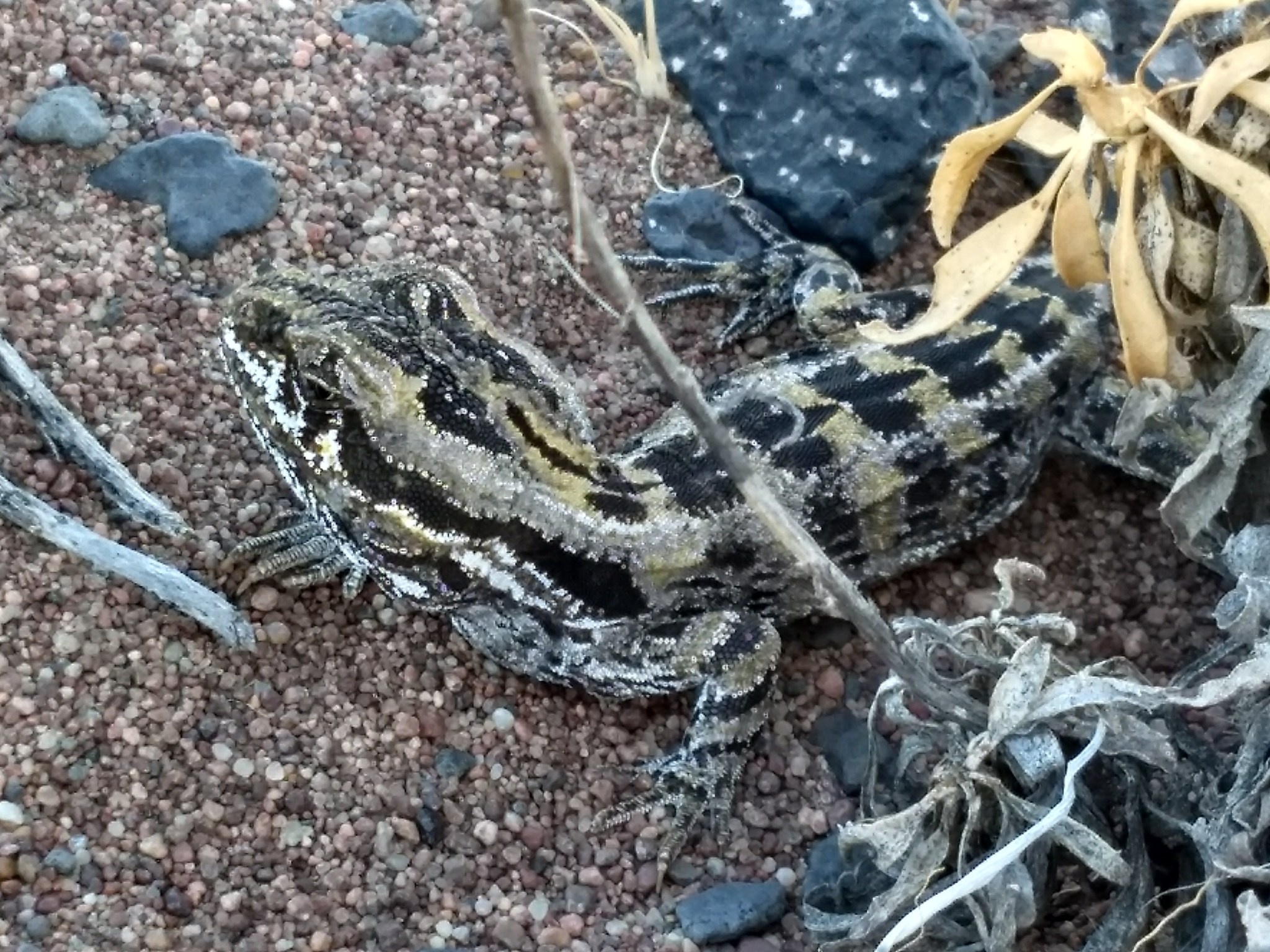

Conservation status
- Least Concern (IUCN 3.1)

Scientific classification
- Kingdom: Animalia
- Phylum: Chordata
- Class: Reptilia
- Order: Squamata
- Suborder: Iguania
- Family: Leiosauridae
- Genus: Leiosaurus
- Species: L. bellii

Binomial name
- Leiosaurus bellii Duméril & Bibron, 1837

= Leiosaurus bellii =

Species of lizard

Leiosaurus bellii, Bell's anole, is a species of lizard in the family Leiosauridae. It is native to Argentina.
