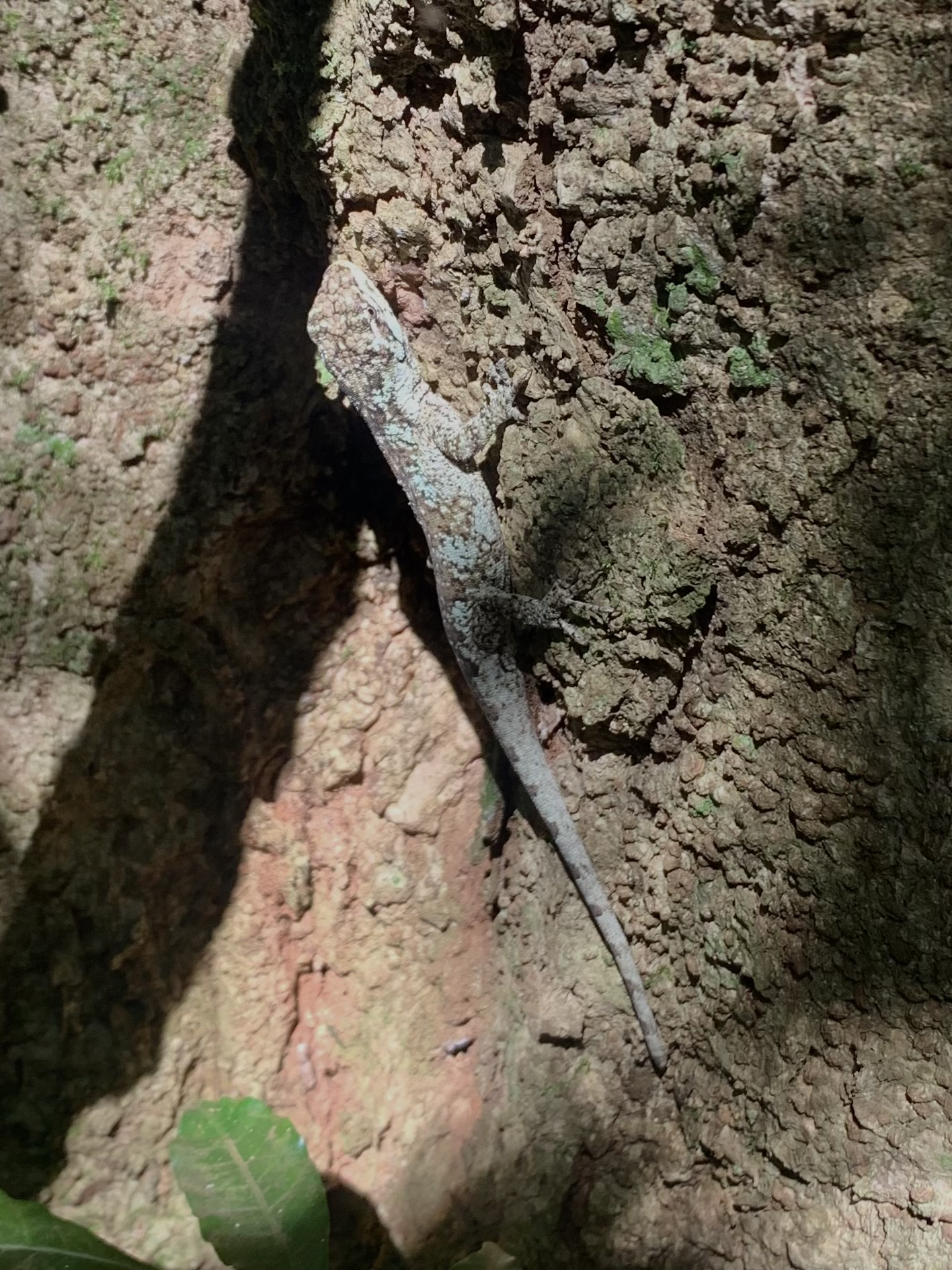
- Brazilian steppe iguana in Cantareira State Park, São Paulo, Brazil

Conservation status
- Least Concern (IUCN 3.1)

Scientific classification
- Kingdom: Animalia
- Phylum: Chordata
- Class: Reptilia
- Order: Squamata
- Suborder: Iguania
- Family: Leiosauridae
- Genus: Urostrophus
- Species: U. vautieri

Binomial name
- Urostrophus vautieri A.M.C. Duméril & Bibron, 1837

= Urostrophus vautieri =

Species of lizard

Urostrophus vautieri, also known commonly as the Brazilian steppe iguana, is a species of lizard in the family Leiosauridae. The species is endemic to Brazil.
