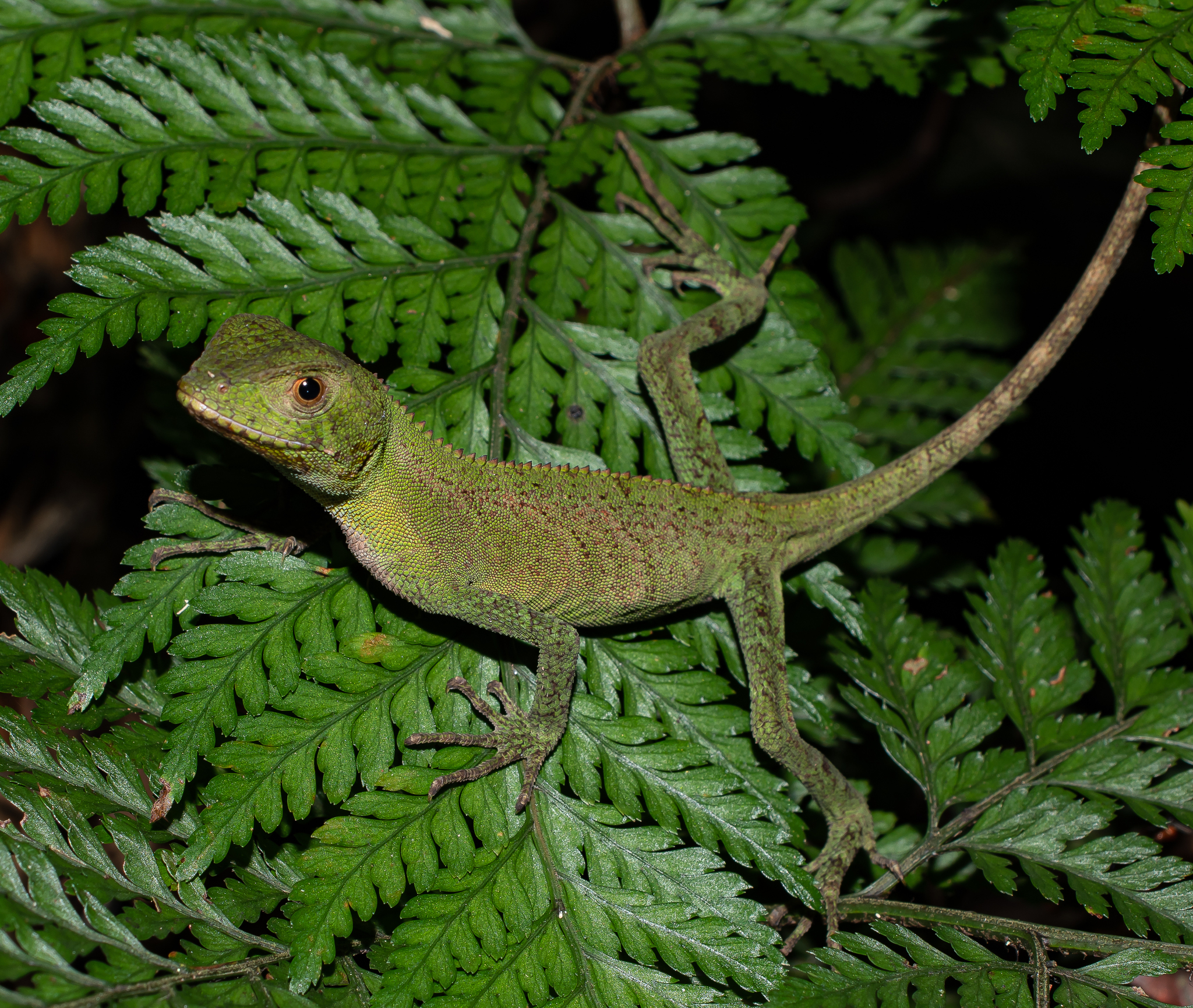
- Enyalius perditus

Conservation status
- Least Concern (IUCN 3.1)

Scientific classification
- Kingdom: Animalia
- Phylum: Chordata
- Class: Reptilia
- Order: Squamata
- Suborder: Iguania
- Family: Leiosauridae
- Genus: Enyalius
- Species: E. perditus

Binomial name
- Enyalius perditus Jackson, 1978

= Enyalius perditus =

Species of lizard

Enyalius perditus is a species of lizard in the family Leiosauridae. It is native to Brazil.
