= Enyalius capetinga =

Scientific classification
- Kingdom: Animalia
- Phylum: Chordata
- Class: Reptilia
- Order: Squamata
- Suborder: Iguania
- Family: Leiosauridae
- Genus: Enyalius
- Species: E. capetinga

Binomial name
- Enyalius capetinga Breitman et al., 2018

Species of lizard

Enyalius capetinga is a species of lizard in the family Leiosauridae. It is endemic to Brazil.
