= Pristidactylus nigroiugulus =

Conservation status
- Least Concern (IUCN 3.1)

Scientific classification
- Kingdom: Animalia
- Phylum: Chordata
- Class: Reptilia
- Order: Squamata
- Suborder: Iguania
- Family: Leiosauridae
- Genus: Pristidactylus
- Species: P. nigroiugulus

Binomial name
- Pristidactylus nigroiugulus Cei, Scolaro, & Videla, 2001

Species of lizard

Pristidactylus nigroiugulus is a species of lizard in the family Leiosauridae. The species is endemic to Argentina.
