= Pomacea commissionis =

Scientific classification
- Domain: Eukaryota
- Kingdom: Animalia
- Phylum: Mollusca
- Class: Gastropoda
- Subclass: Caenogastropoda
- Order: Architaenioglossa
- Superfamily: Ampullarioidea
- Family: Ampullariidae
- Subfamily: Pomaceinae
- Genus: Pomacea
- Species: P. commissionis

Binomial name
- Pomacea commissionis (Ihering, 1898)

Synonyms
- Ampullaria decussata var. commissionis Ihering, 1898 (original combination); Pomacea (Pomacea) commissionis (Ihering, 1898) · accepted, alternate representation

Species of snail

Pomacea comissionis is a species of freshwater snail in the family Ampullariidae. It was first described by Hermann von Ihering in 1898 as a variety (i.e., subspecies) of Ampullaria decussata. It is known from Iguape, Brazil.
