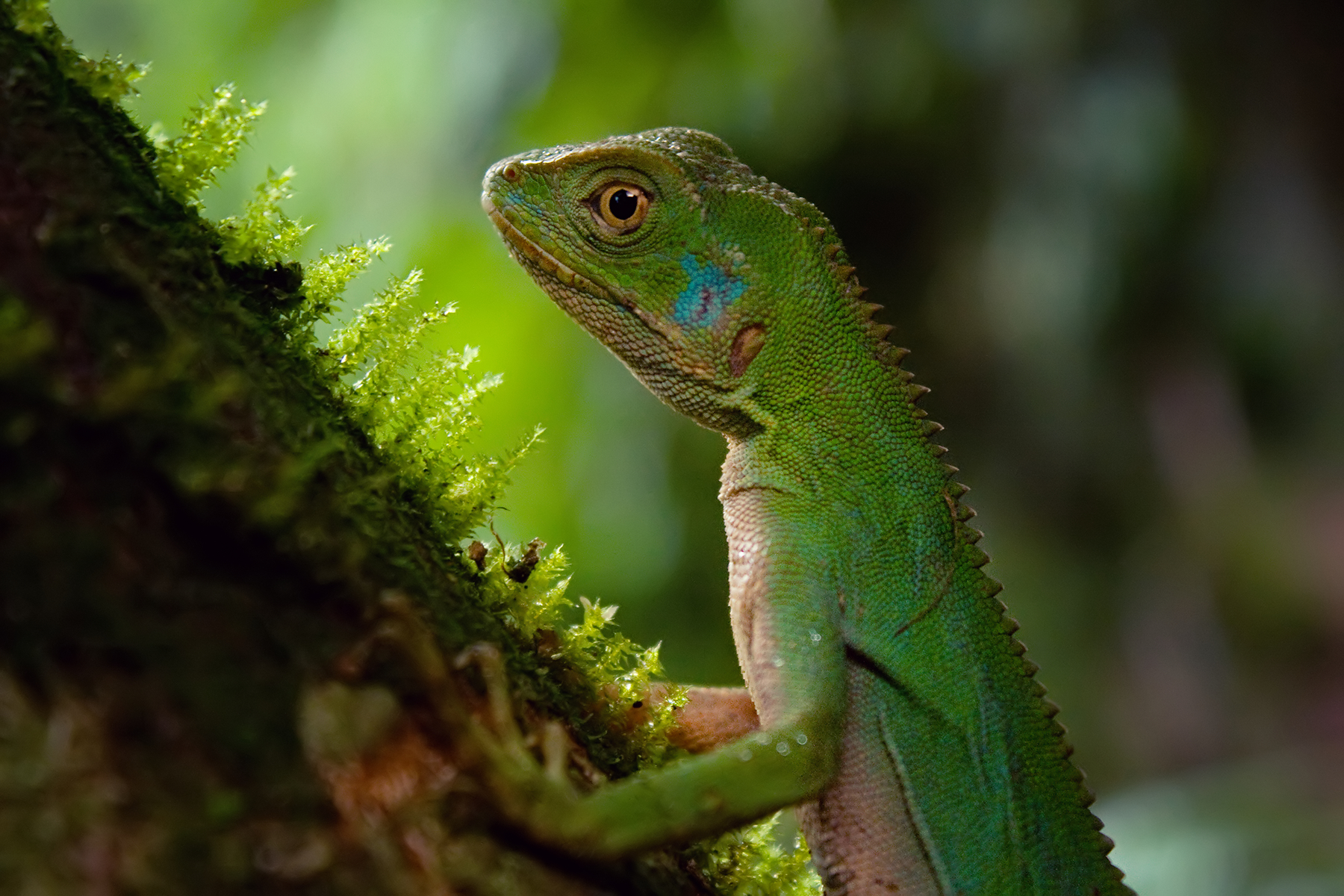

Conservation status
- Least Concern (IUCN 3.1)

Scientific classification
- Kingdom: Animalia
- Phylum: Chordata
- Class: Reptilia
- Order: Squamata
- Suborder: Iguania
- Family: Leiosauridae
- Genus: Enyalius
- Species: E. iheringii

Binomial name
- Enyalius iheringii Boulenger, 1885

= Enyalius iheringii =

Species of lizard

Enyalius iheringii, also known commonly as Ihering's fathead anole, is a species of lizard in the family Leiosauridae. The species is endemic to Brazil.

== Etymology ==
The specific name, iheringii, is in honor of German-Brazilian zoologist Hermann von Ihering.

== Geographic range ==
E. iheringii is found in southeastern Brazil, in the Brazilian states of Paraná, Rio de Janeiro, Rio Grande do Sul, Santa Catarina, and São Paulo.

== Habitat ==
The preferred natural habitat of E. iheringii is forest.

== Behavior ==
E. iheringii is terrestrial and semiarboreal.

== Diet ==
E. iheringii preys upon beetles, caterpillars, and spiders.
