= Enyalius leechii =

Conservation status
- Least Concern (IUCN 3.1)

Scientific classification
- Kingdom: Animalia
- Phylum: Chordata
- Class: Reptilia
- Order: Squamata
- Suborder: Iguania
- Family: Leiosauridae
- Genus: Enyalius
- Species: E. leechii

Binomial name
- Enyalius leechii (Boulenger, 1885)

Synonyms
- Enyalioides leechii Boulenger, 1885; Garbesaura garbei Amaral, 1933

Species of lizard

Enyalius leechii, also known commonly as Leech's fathead anole and camaleãozinho in Brazilian Portuguese, is a species of lizard in the family Leiosauridae. The species is endemic to Brazil.

== Etymology ==
The specific name, leechii, was chosen by Boulenger to honor English entomologist John Henry Leech.

== Description ==
The maximum recorded snout-to-vent length (SVL) of E. leechii is 9.3 cm (3.7 in) for a male, and 10.7 cm (4.2 in) for a female.

== Geographic range ==
E. leechii is found in the Brazilian states of Maranhão, Mato Grosso, Pará, and Rondônia.

== Habitat ==
The preferred natural habitat of E. leechii is forest.

== Diet ==
E. leechii preys upon termites and caterpillars.
