= Diplolaemus sexcinctus =

Conservation status
- Least Concern (IUCN 3.1)

Scientific classification
- Kingdom: Animalia
- Phylum: Chordata
- Class: Reptilia
- Order: Squamata
- Suborder: Iguania
- Family: Leiosauridae
- Genus: Diplolaemus
- Species: D. sexcinctus

Binomial name
- Diplolaemus sexcinctus Cei, Scolaro, & Videla, 2003

Species of lizard

Diplolaemus sexcinctus is a species of lizard in the family Leiosauridae. It is native to Argentina and Chile.
