= Leiosaurus jaguaris =

Conservation status
- Least Concern (IUCN 3.1)

Scientific classification
- Kingdom: Animalia
- Phylum: Chordata
- Class: Reptilia
- Order: Squamata
- Suborder: Iguania
- Family: Leiosauridae
- Genus: Leiosaurus
- Species: L. jaguaris

Binomial name
- Leiosaurus jaguaris Laspiur, Acosta, & Abdal, 2007

Species of lizard

Leiosaurus jaguaris is a species of lizard in the family Leiosauridae. It is native to Argentina.
