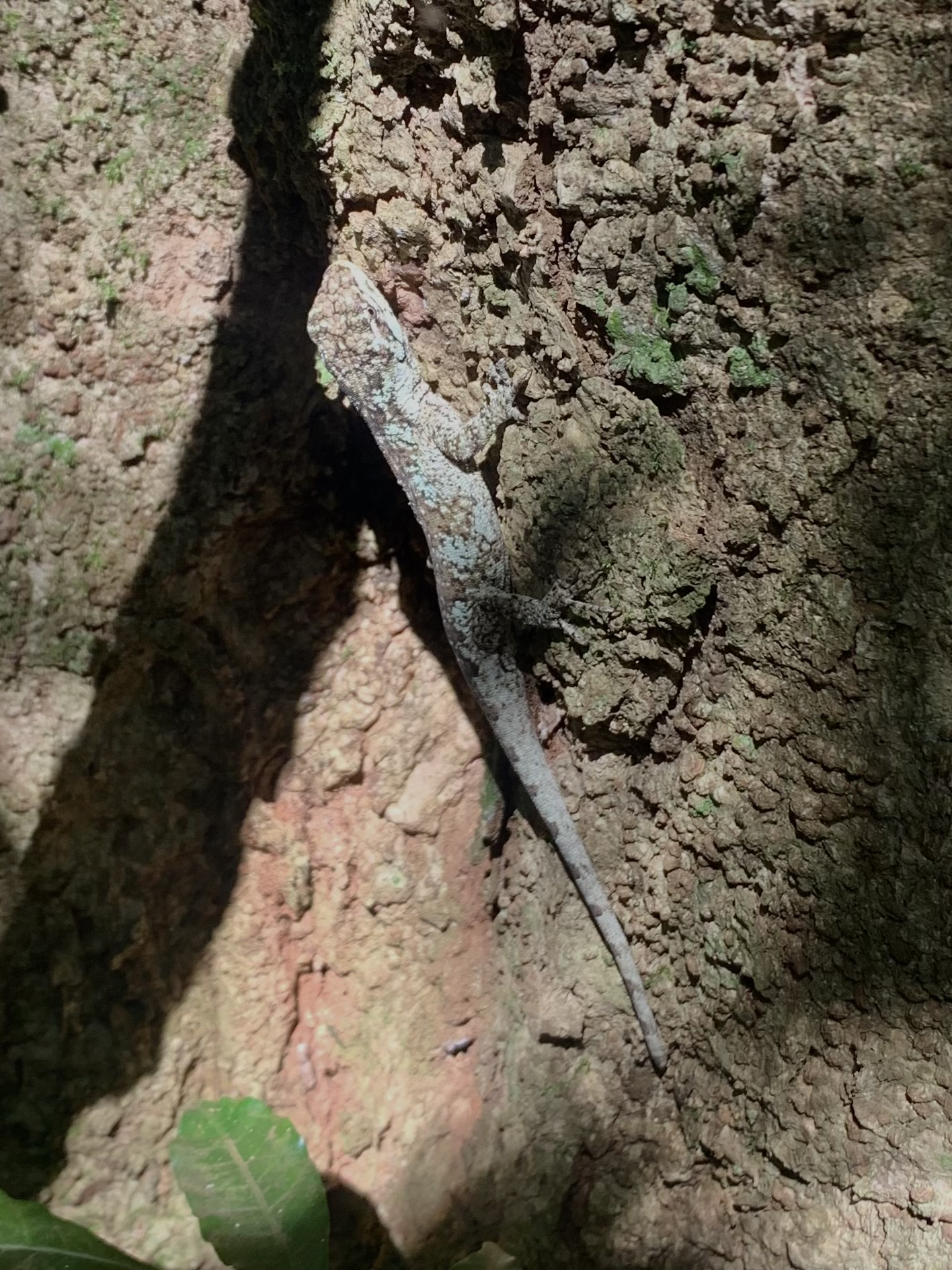
- Urostrophus vautieri in Cantareira State Park, São Paulo, Brazil

Scientific classification
- Domain: Eukaryota
- Kingdom: Animalia
- Phylum: Chordata
- Class: Reptilia
- Order: Squamata
- Suborder: Iguania
- Family: Leiosauridae
- Genus: Urostrophus; Duméril & Bibron, 1837

= Urostrophus =

Genus of lizards

Urostrophus is a genus of lizards belonging to the family Leiosauridae.

The species of this genus are found in South America.

== Species ==
Species:

- Urostrophus gallardoi Etheridge & Williams, 1991
- Urostrophus vautieri Duméril & Bibron, 1837 - Brazilian steppe iguana
