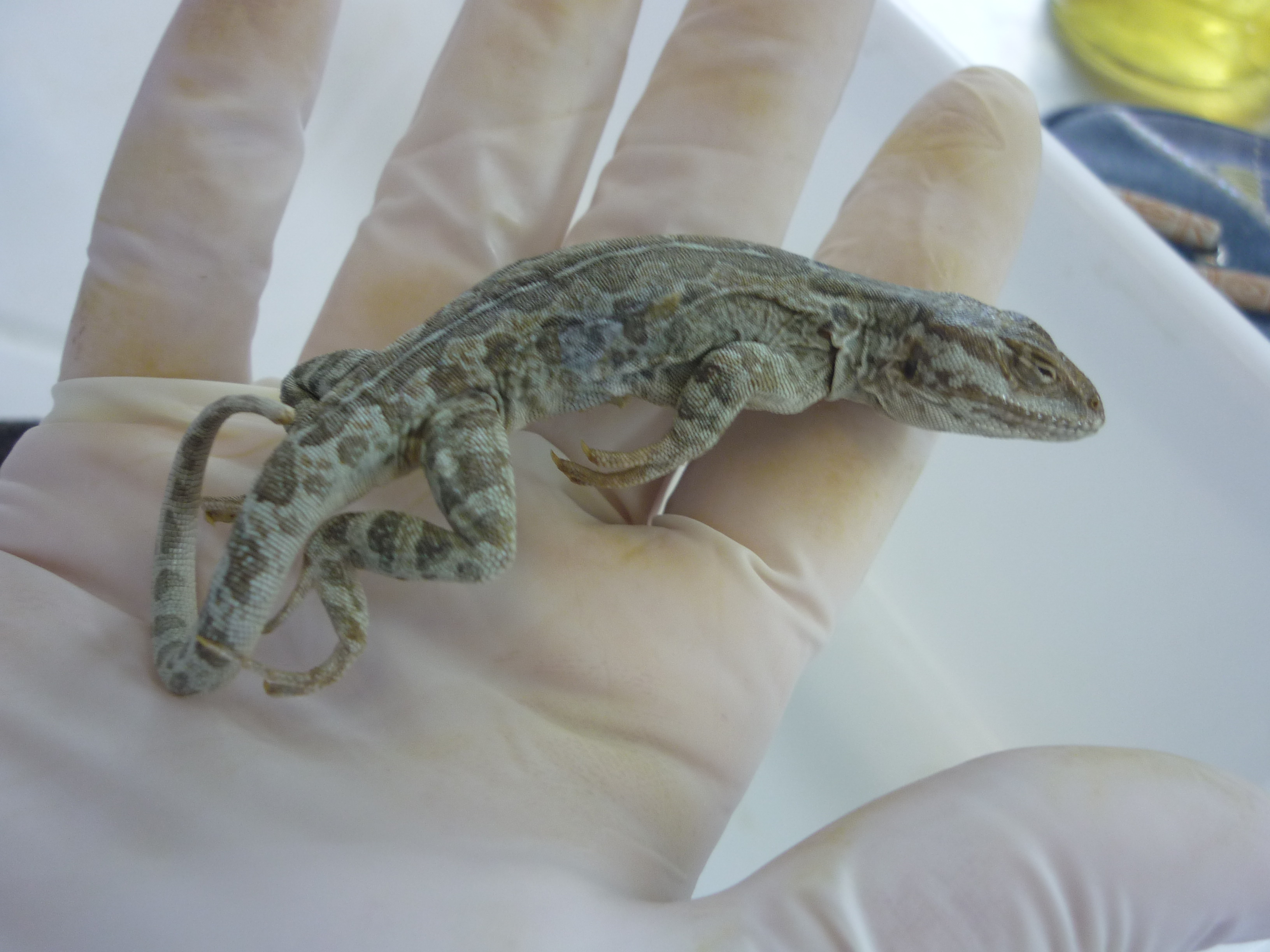

Conservation status
- Critically Endangered (IUCN 3.1)

Scientific classification
- Kingdom: Animalia
- Phylum: Chordata
- Class: Reptilia
- Order: Squamata
- Suborder: Iguania
- Family: Leiosauridae
- Genus: Pristidactylus
- Species: P. casuhatiensis

Binomial name
- Pristidactylus casuhatiensis (Gallardo, 1968)

= Pristidactylus casuhatiensis =

Species of lizard

Pristidactylus casuhatiensis, the Casuhatien anole, is a species of lizard in the family Leiosauridae. The species is endemic to Argentina.
