= Pristidactylus scapulatus =

Conservation status
- Least Concern (IUCN 3.1)

Scientific classification
- Kingdom: Animalia
- Phylum: Chordata
- Class: Reptilia
- Order: Squamata
- Suborder: Iguania
- Family: Leiosauridae
- Genus: Pristidactylus
- Species: P. scapulatus

Binomial name
- Pristidactylus scapulatus (Burmeister, 1861)

Species of lizard

Pristidactylus scapulatus, Burmeister's anole, is a species of lizard in the family Leiosauridae. The species is endemic to Argentina.
