= Enyalius erythroceneus =

Scientific classification
- Kingdom: Animalia
- Phylum: Chordata
- Class: Reptilia
- Order: Squamata
- Suborder: Iguania
- Family: Leiosauridae
- Genus: Enyalius
- Species: E. erythroceneus

Binomial name
- Enyalius erythroceneus Rodrigues, de Freitas, Santos Silva, & Viña Bertolotto, 2006

Species of lizard

Enyalius erythroceneus is a species of lizard in the family Leiosauridae. It is endemic to Brazil, in the state of Bahia.
