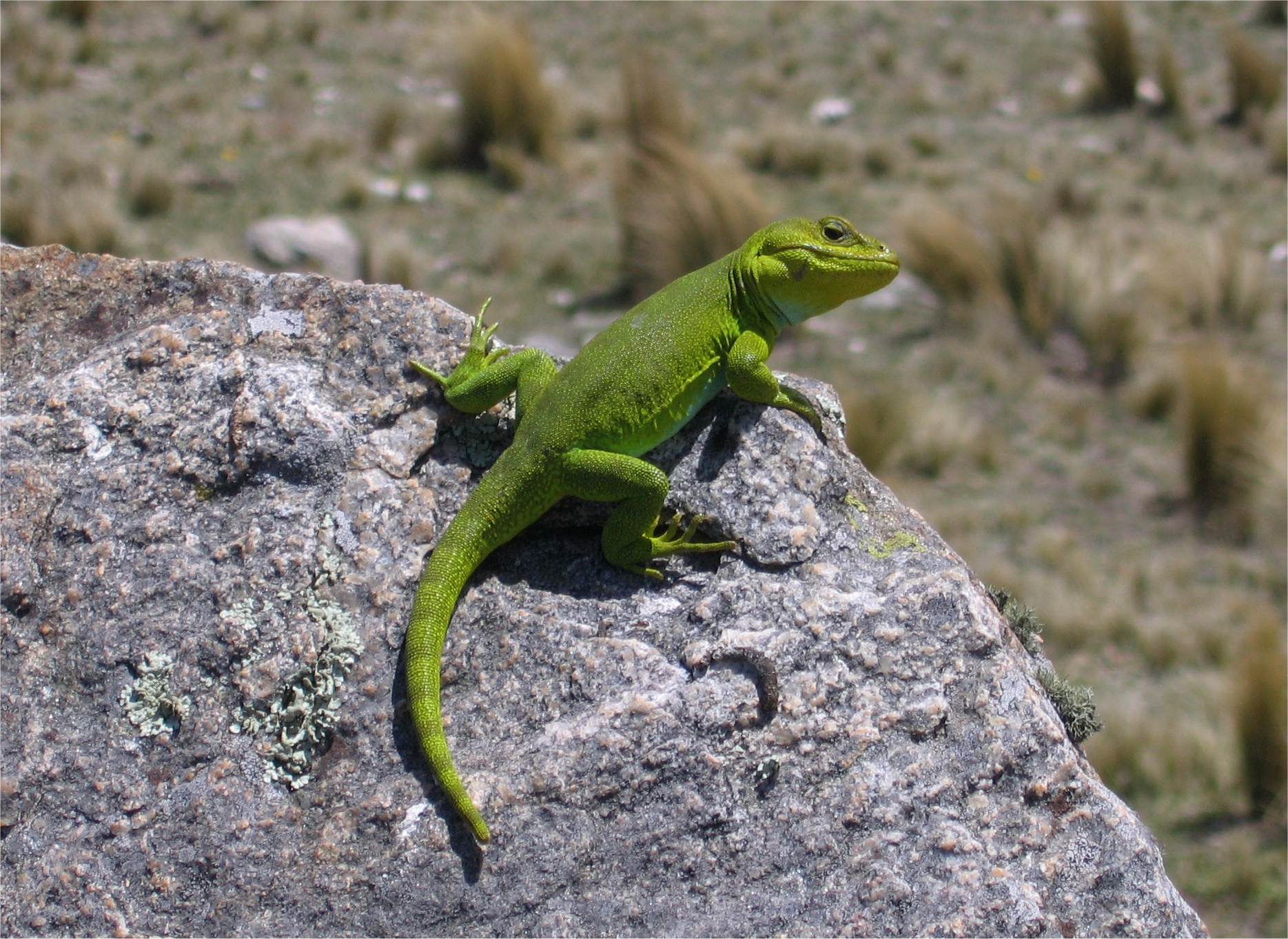
- Pristidactylus achalensis

Scientific classification
- Kingdom: Animalia
- Phylum: Chordata
- Class: Reptilia
- Order: Squamata
- Suborder: Iguania
- Family: Leiosauridae
- Genus: Pristidactylus; Fitzinger, 1843

Type species
- Leiosaurus fasciatus d'Orbigny & Bibron, 1837

Synonyms
- Ptenodactylus Gray, 1845

= Pristidactylus =

Genus of lizards

Pristidactylus is a genus of lizards from Chile and Argentina.

== Species ==
Pristidactylus contains ten recognized species:

- Pristidactylus achalensis (Gallardo, 1964) - Argentine anole
- Pristidactylus alvaroi (Donoso-Barros, 1975)
- Pristidactylus araucanus (Gallardo, 1964)
- Pristidactylus casuhatiensis (Gallardo, 1968) - Casuhatien anole
- Pristidactylus fasciatus (d'Orbigny & Bibron, 1837) - D'Orbigny's banded anole
- Pristidactylus nigroiugulus Cei, Scolaro & Videla, 2001
- Pristidactylus scapulatus (Burmeister, 1861) - Burmeister's anole
- Pristidactylus torquatus (Philippi, 1861)
- Pristidactylus valeriae (Donoso-Barros, 1966)
- Pristidactylus volcanensis Lamborot & Díaz, 1987

Nota bene: A binomial authority in parentheses indicates that the species was originally described in a genus other than Pristidactylus.
