= Urostrophus gallardoi =

Conservation status
- Data Deficient (IUCN 3.1)

Scientific classification
- Kingdom: Animalia
- Phylum: Chordata
- Class: Reptilia
- Order: Squamata
- Suborder: Iguania
- Family: Leiosauridae
- Genus: Urostrophus
- Species: U. gallardoi

Binomial name
- Urostrophus gallardoi Etheridge & E. Williams, 1991

Species of lizard

Urostrophus gallardoi is a species of lizard in the family Leiosauridae. The species is native to South America.

== Etymology ==
The specific name, gallardoi, is in honor of Argentinean herpetologist José María Alfonso Félix Gallardo.

== Geographic range ==
U. gallardoi is found in northwestern Argentina and southern Bolivia.

== Habitat ==
The preferred natural habitat of U. gallardoi is forest, at altitudes of 600–1,300 m (2,000–4,300 ft).

== Diet ==
U. gallardoi preys upon insects.

== Reproduction ==
U. gallardoi is oviparous.
