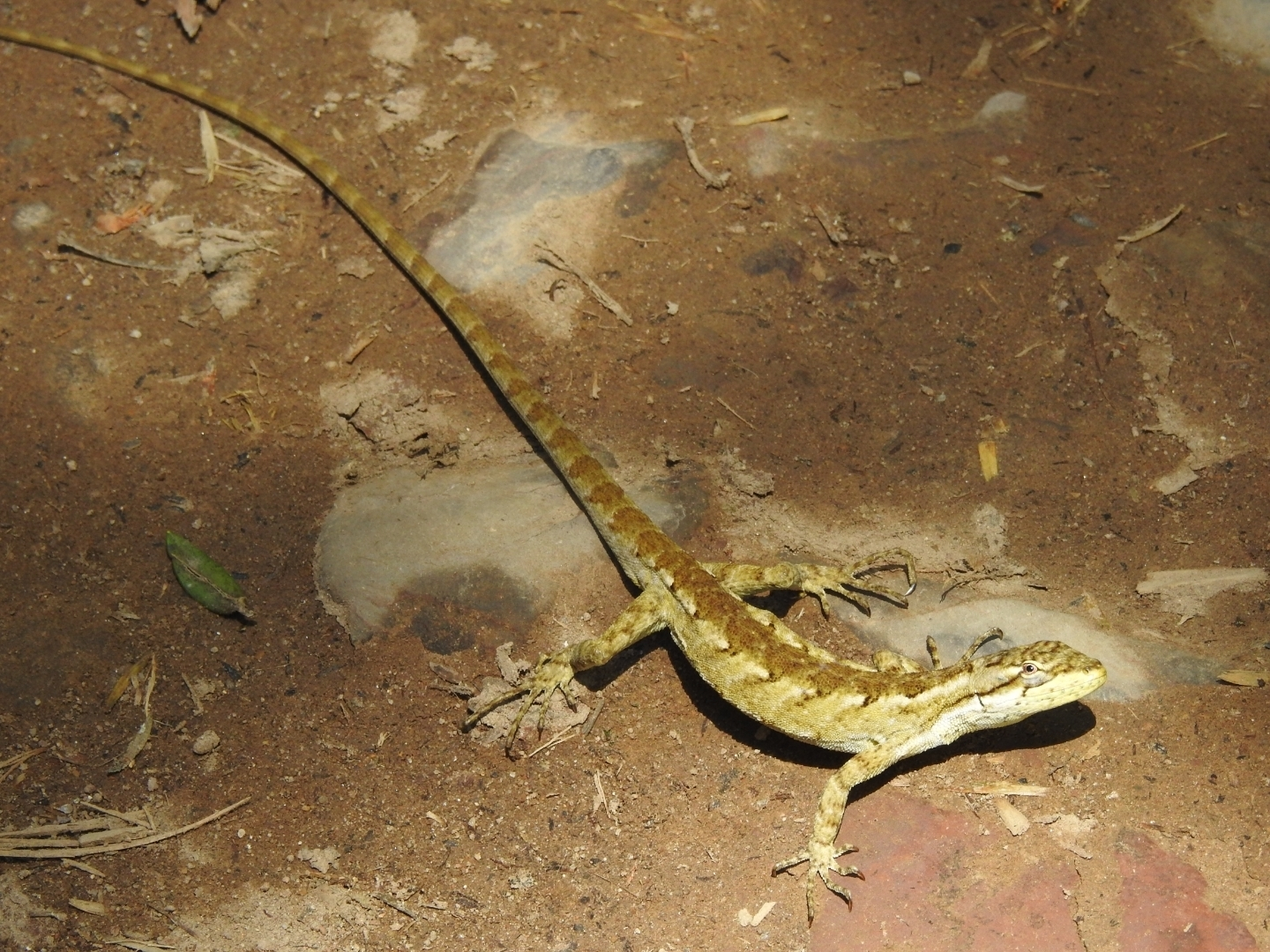

Conservation status
- Least Concern (IUCN 3.1)

Scientific classification
- Kingdom: Animalia
- Phylum: Chordata
- Class: Reptilia
- Order: Squamata
- Suborder: Iguania
- Family: Leiosauridae
- Genus: Anisolepis
- Species: A. grilli

Binomial name
- Anisolepis grilli Boulenger, 1891

Synonyms
- Anisolepis grilli Boulenger, 1891; Anisolepis undulatus — Boettger, 1893; Anisolepis lionotus F. Werner, 1896; Aptycholaemus longicauda C. Burt & M. Burt, 1930; Anisolepis iheringi — Etheridge, 1965; Anisolepis grilli — J. Peters & Donoso-Barros, 1970; Urostrophus grilli — A.L.G. Carvalho et al., 2023

= Anisolepis grilli =

Species of lizard

Anisolepis grilli, commonly known as Boulenger's tree lizard and papa-vento-do-rabo-rajado in Brazilian Portuguese, is a species of lizard in the family Leiosauridae. The species is endemic to South America.

== Etymology ==
The specific name, grilli, is in honor of Italo-Brazilian physician Giuseppe Franco Grillo.

== Geographic range ==
A. grilli is native to extreme northwestern Argentina, adjacent southeastern Brazil, and Uruguay.

The type locality is Palmeira, Paraná, Brazil.

== Habitat ==
The preferred natural habitats of A. grilli are forest and grassland.

== Reproduction ==
A. grilli is oviparous.
