= Pristidactylus torquatus =

Conservation status
- Vulnerable (IUCN 3.1)

Scientific classification
- Kingdom: Animalia
- Phylum: Chordata
- Class: Reptilia
- Order: Squamata
- Suborder: Iguania
- Family: Leiosauridae
- Genus: Pristidactylus
- Species: P. torquatus

Binomial name
- Pristidactylus torquatus (Philippi, 1861)

Species of lizard

Pristidactylus torquatus, commonly known as lagarto de bosque, the southern grumbler, or the forest lizard, is a species of lizard in the family Iguanidae. The specific name is derived from the Latin "torquatus" meaning wearing a twisted collar or necklace. This species is endemic to the Bío Bío Region, the Araucanía Region and the Los Lagos Regions of Chile.

== Description ==
Pristidactylus torquatus is a robust lizard with strong legs and a large head. The back is generally reddish-brown with large patches of grey and there is a dark collar around the throat. The underside is paler and the region round the vent is greenish-yellow. This lizard grows to a snout-to-vent length of about 6 to 11 cm (2.4 to 4.3 in).

== Distribution and habitat ==
Pristidactylus torquatus is endemic to Chile where it is found on the west side of the Andes between 35° and 42° south. The regions in which it is found are Biobío, La Araucania and Los Lagos. Its natural habitat is the extensive southern beech forests (Nothofagus) that grow in this temperate climate.

== Behaviour ==
Pristidactylus torquatus is a terrestrial species and is found mainly on the ground under the forest trees. It feeds chiefly on beetles which it chews up with its strong jaws. The female lays a clutch of about six eggs in a hole in the sand.
