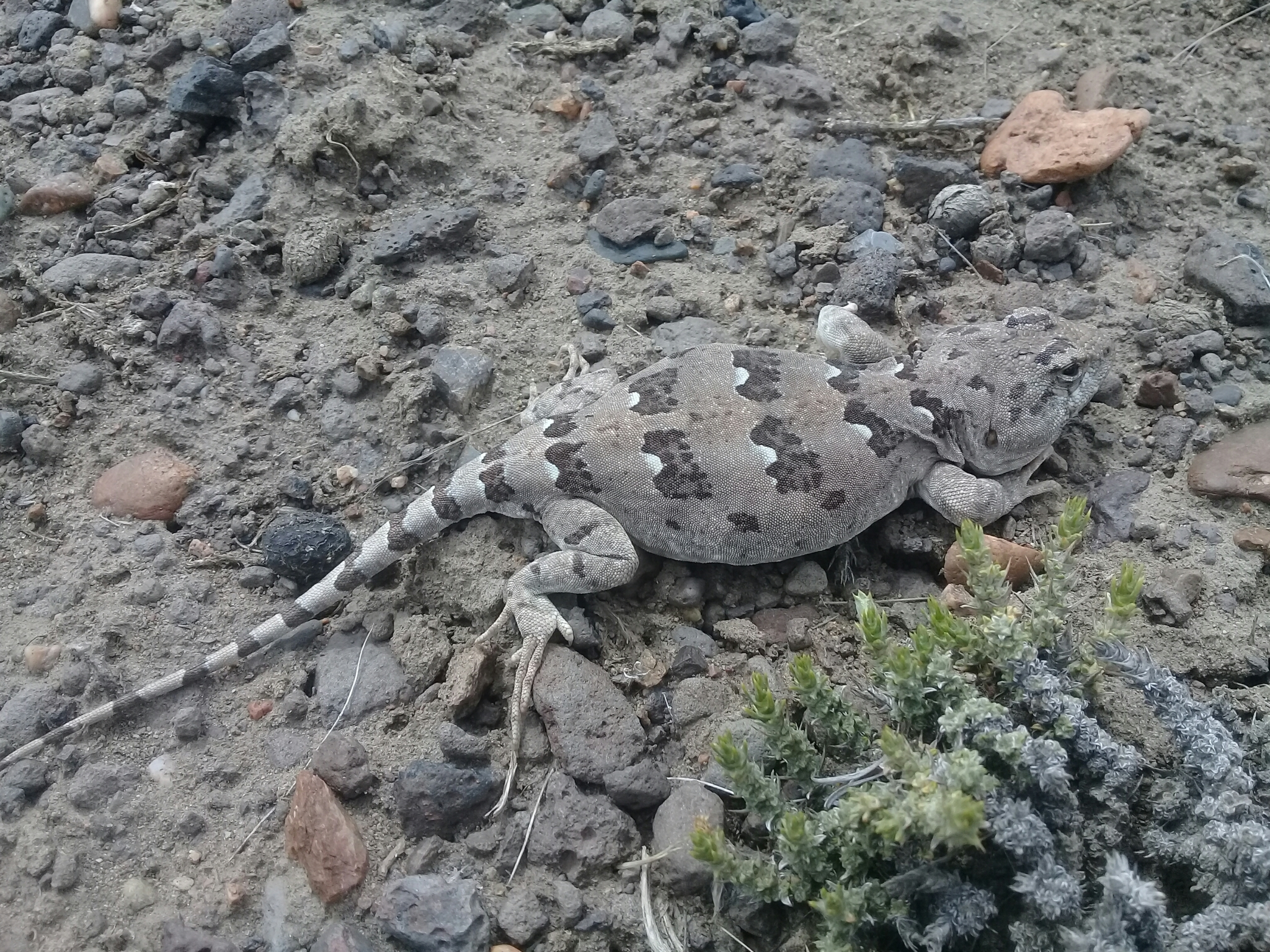

Conservation status
- Least Concern (IUCN 3.1)

Scientific classification
- Kingdom: Animalia
- Phylum: Chordata
- Class: Reptilia
- Order: Squamata
- Suborder: Iguania
- Family: Leiosauridae
- Genus: Diplolaemus
- Species: D. bibronii

Binomial name
- Diplolaemus bibronii Bell, 1843

= Diplolaemus bibronii =

Species of lizard

Diplolaemus bibronii, commonly known as Bibron's iguana, is a species of lizard in the family Leiosauridae. It is native to Argentina and Chile.
