= Enyalius boulengeri =

Scientific classification
- Kingdom: Animalia
- Phylum: Chordata
- Class: Reptilia
- Order: Squamata
- Suborder: Iguania
- Family: Leiosauridae
- Genus: Enyalius
- Species: E. boulengeri

Binomial name
- Enyalius boulengeri Etheridge, 1969

Synonyms
- Enyalius boulengeri Etheridge, 1969; Enyalius brasiliensis boulengeri — J.F. Jackson, 1978; Enyalius boulengeri — Frost et al., 2001

Species of lizard

Enyalius boulengeri, also known commonly as the Brazilian fathead anole, is a species of lizard in the family Leiosauridae. The species is endemic to Brazil.

== Etymology ==
The specific name, boulengeri, is in honor of Belgian-born British herpetologist George Albert Boulenger.

== Geographic range ==
E. boulengeri is found in southeastern Brazil, in the Brazilian states of Espírito Santo and Minas Gerais.

== Habitat ==
The preferred natural habitat of E. boulengeri is forest.

== Description ==
The holotype of E. boulengeri, which is an adult female, has a snout to vent length (SVL) of 11 cm (4.3 in), and a tail length of 18 cm (7.1 in).

== Reproduction ==
E. boulengeri is oviparous. Clutch size is 7–12 eggs.
