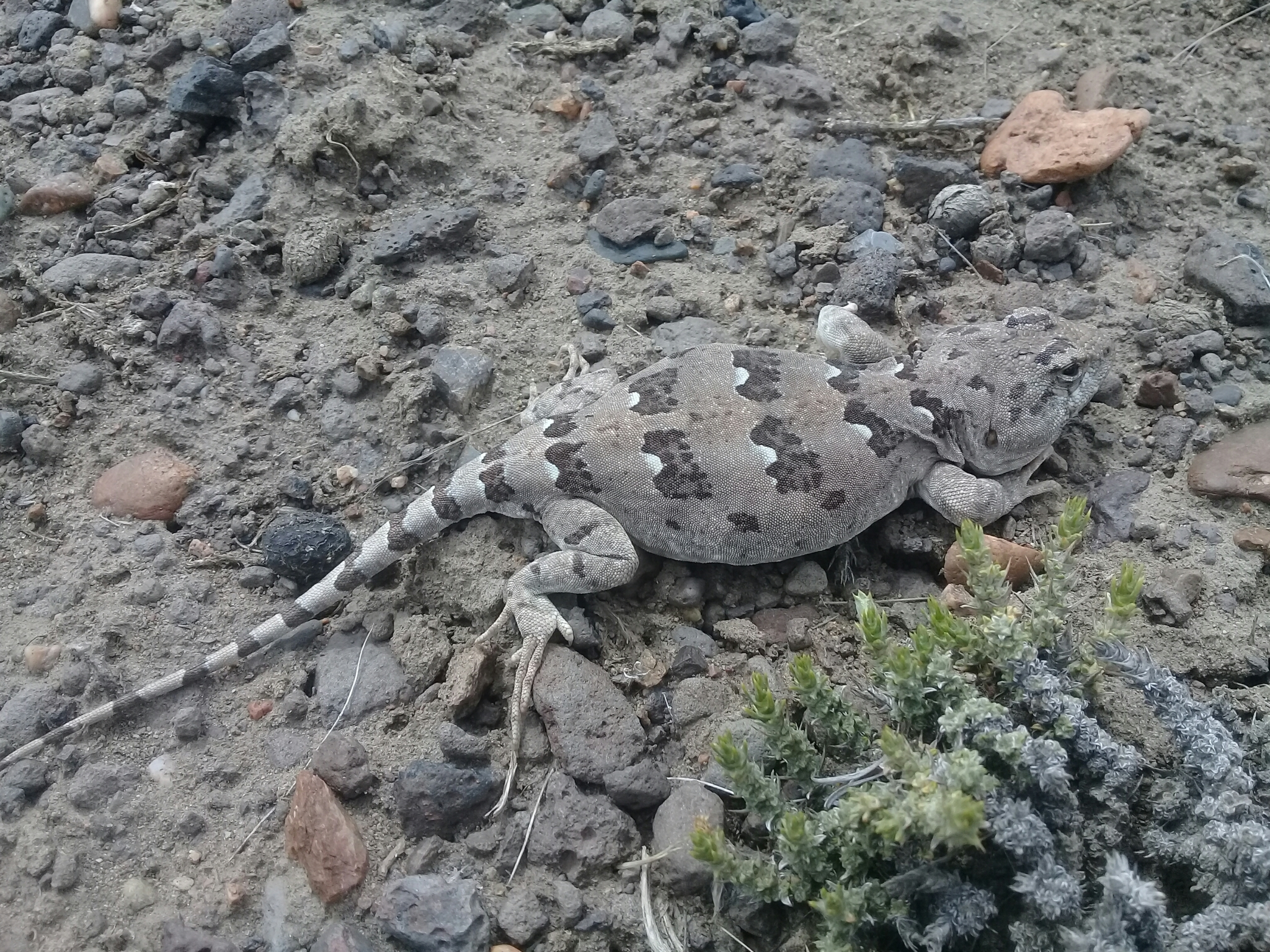
- Diplolaemus bibronii

Scientific classification
- Kingdom: Animalia
- Phylum: Chordata
- Class: Reptilia
- Order: Squamata
- Suborder: Iguania
- Family: Leiosauridae
- Genus: Diplolaemus; Bell, 1843
- Red = D. darwinii Yellow = D. leopardinus Green = D. sexcinctus Blue = D. bibronii

= Diplolaemus =

Genus of lizards

Diplolaemus is a genus of lizards in the family Leiosauridae. The genus is endemic to southern South America.

== Species ==
Diplolaemus contains the following four species:

- Diplolaemus bibronii Bell, 1843 – Bibron's iguana

Range: Argentina (Patagonia from Santa Cruz to Aysén and Magallanes), Chile

- Diplolaemus darwinii Bell, 1843 – Darwin's iguana

Range: Argentina (Patagonia, Santa Cruz), Chile

- Diplolaemus leopardinus (F. Werner, 1898) – leopard iguana

Range: Argentina (Patagonia, Neuquen)

- Diplolaemus sexcinctus Cei, Scolaro & Videla, 2003

Range: Argentina, Chile
