= Saint-Alban-les-Eaux =

- Commune
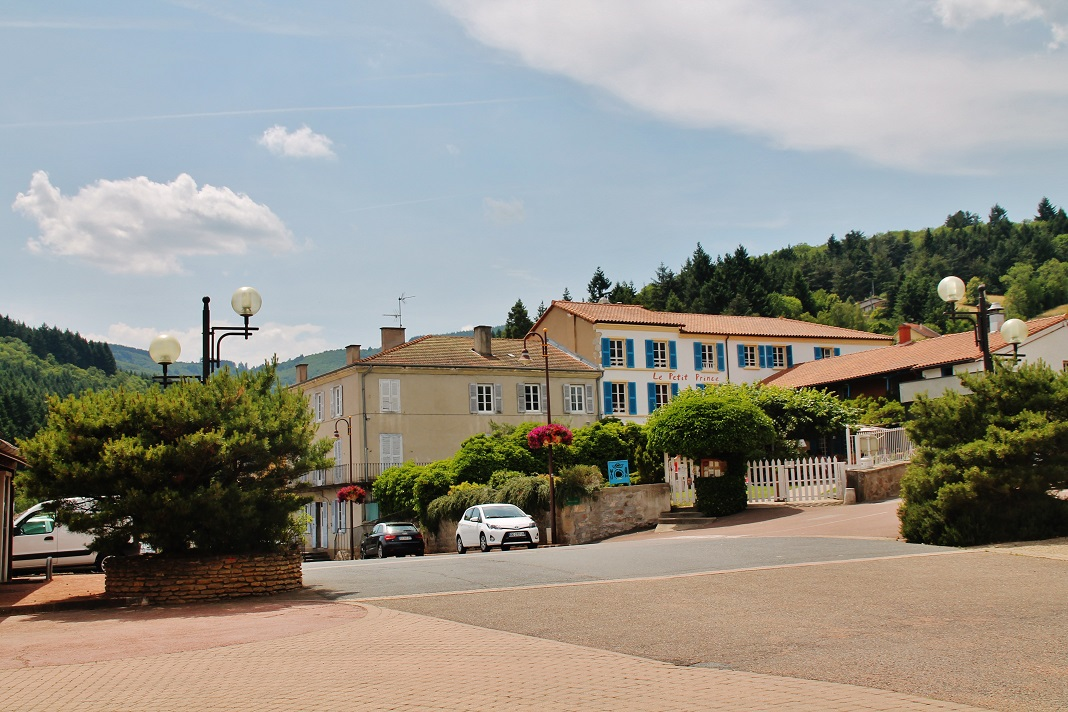

- Coat of arms
- Location of Saint-Alban-les-Eaux
- Location within France Location within Auvergne-Rhône-Alpes
- Coordinates: 46°00′35″N 3°56′11″E
- Country: France
- Region: Auvergne-Rhône-Alpes
- Department: Loire
- Arrondissement: Roanne
- Canton: Renaison
- Intercommunality: Roannais Agglomération

Government
  - Mayor (2020–2026): Pierre Devedeux
- Area^{1}: 7.75 km^{2} (2.99 sq mi)
- Elevation: 450 m (1,480 ft)
- Highest elevation: 791 m (2,595 ft)
- Lowest elevation: 360 m (1,180 ft)
- Population (2023): 912
  - Density: 118/km^{2} (305/sq mi)
- Time zone: UTC+01:00 (CET)
  - Summer (DST): UTC+02:00 (CEST)
- INSEE/Postal code: 42198 /42370
- ^{1} French Land Register data, which excludes lakes, ponds, glaciers > 1 km^{2} (0.386 sq mi or 247 acres) and river estuaries.

Saint-Alban-les-Eaux (French pronunciation: [sɛ̃t‿albɑ̃ lez‿o]) is a commune in the Loire department in central France.

Death place of Gabriel Bibron (1845).

== Population ==
Historical population
Year	Pop.	±% p.a.
1968	728	—
1975	748	+0.39%
1982	755	+0.13%
1990	843	+1.39%
1999	953	+1.37%
2007	935	−0.24%
2012	931	−0.09%
2017	969	+0.80%
2023	912	−1.01%
Source: INSEE

== See also ==
- Communes of the Loire department
