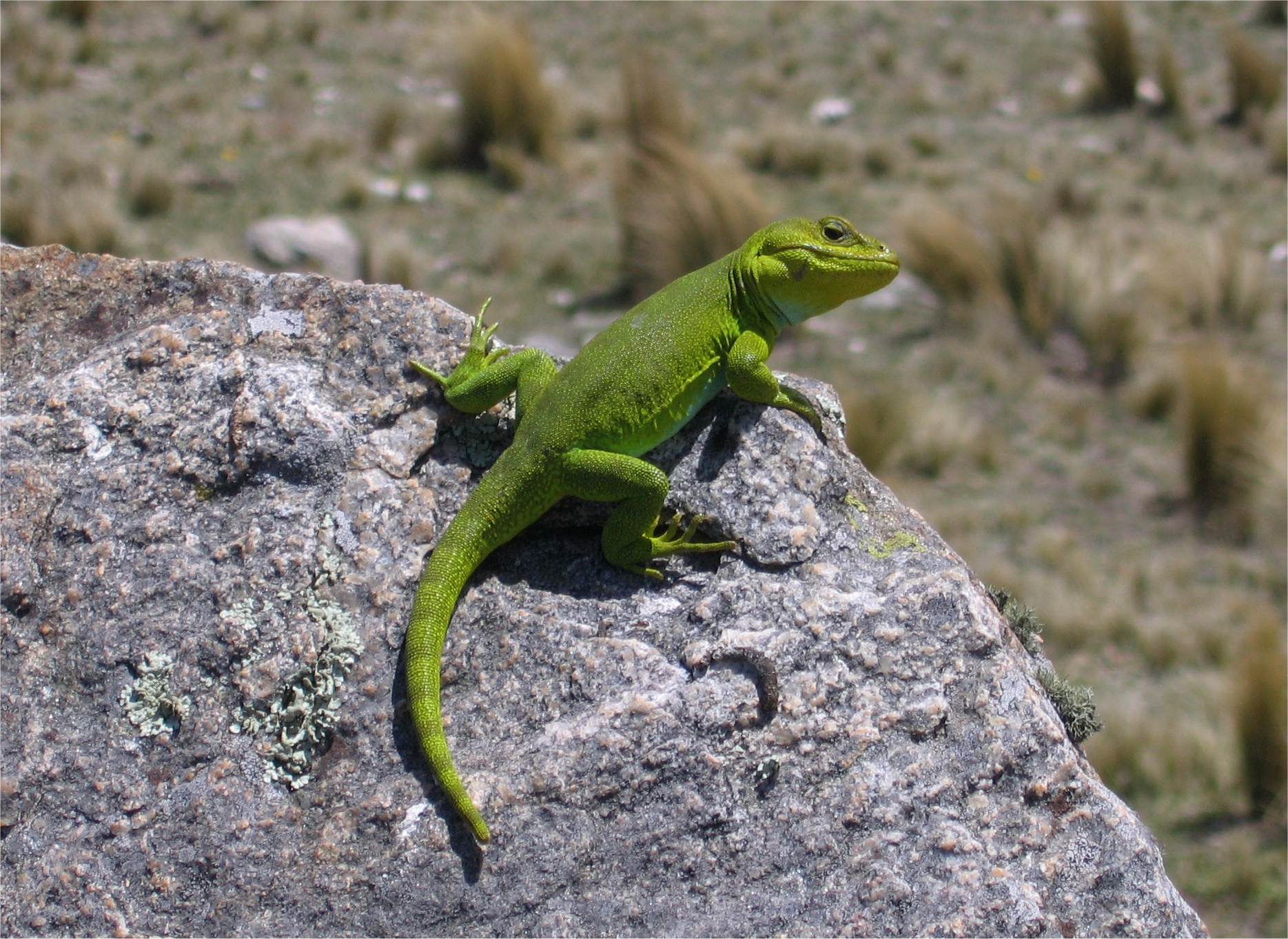

Conservation status
- Near Threatened (IUCN 3.1)

Scientific classification
- Kingdom: Animalia
- Phylum: Chordata
- Class: Reptilia
- Order: Squamata
- Suborder: Iguania
- Family: Leiosauridae
- Genus: Pristidactylus
- Species: P. achalensis

Binomial name
- Pristidactylus achalensis (Gallardo, 1964)

= Pristidactylus achalensis =

Species of lizard

Pristidactylus achalensis, the Argentine anole, is a species of lizard in the family Leiosauridae. The species is endemic to Argentina.
