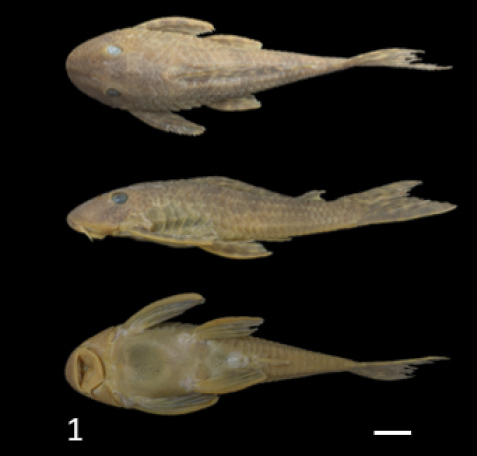

Conservation status
- Least Concern (IUCN 3.1)

Scientific classification
- Kingdom: Animalia
- Phylum: Chordata
- Class: Actinopterygii
- Order: Siluriformes
- Family: Loricariidae
- Genus: Hypostomus
- Species: H. hermanni

Binomial name
- Hypostomus hermanni (Ihering, 1905)

Synonyms
- Plecostomus hermanni

= Hypostomus hermanni =

Species of fish

Hypostomus hermanni, sometimes known as Hermann's pleco, is a species of catfish in the family Loricariidae. It is native to South America, where it occurs in the Tietê River basin, including the Piracicaba River, in Brazil. It is typically found in areas with flowing water of shallow to moderately shallow depth. The species reaches 24 cm (9.4 in) in total length and is believed to be a facultative air-breather.

== Etymology ==
The fish is named in honor of Ihering's father, the German-Brazilian zoologist Hermann von Ihering (1850–1930).
