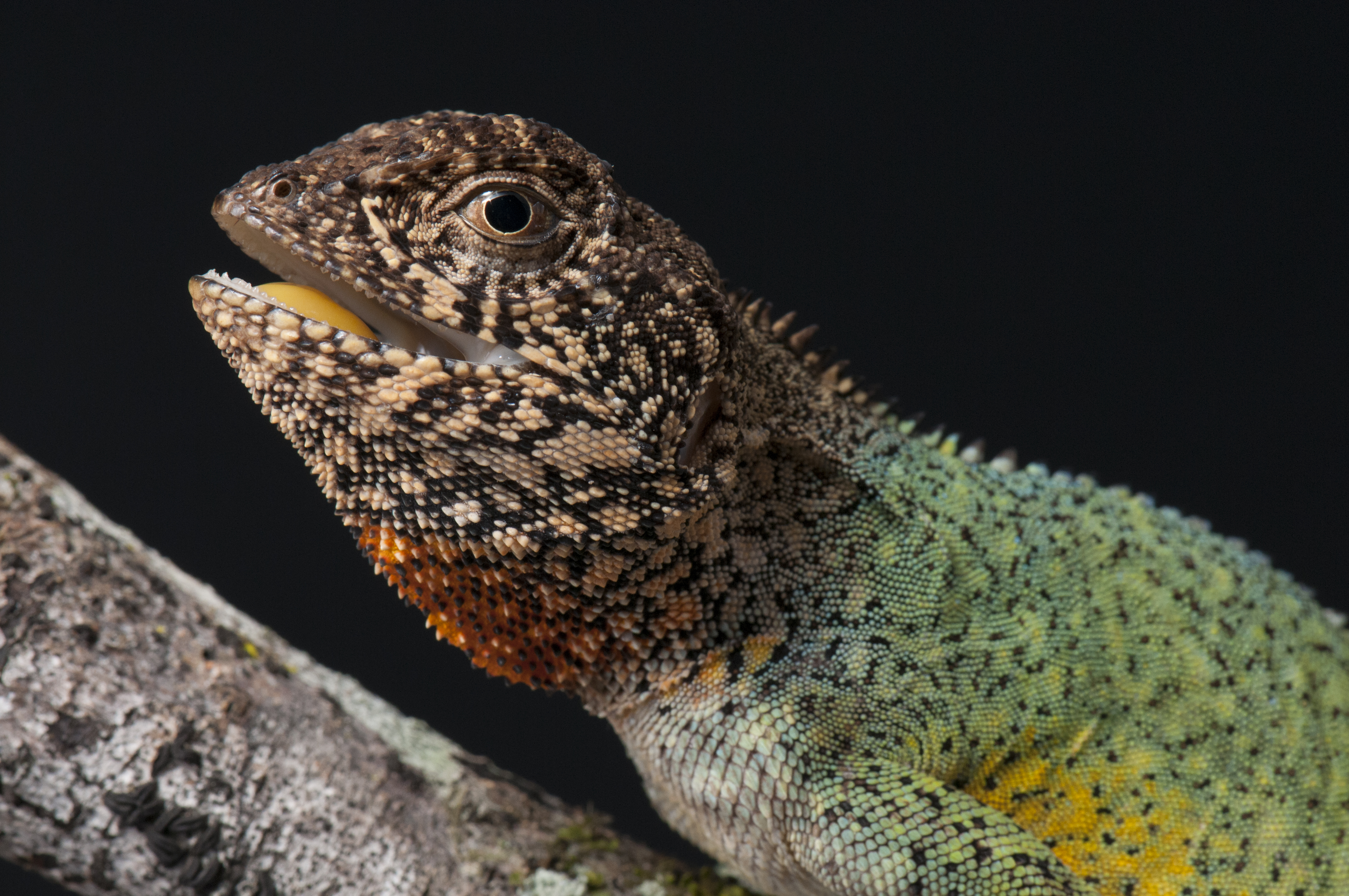

Conservation status
- Least Concern (IUCN 3.1)

Scientific classification
- Kingdom: Animalia
- Phylum: Chordata
- Class: Reptilia
- Order: Squamata
- Suborder: Iguania
- Family: Leiosauridae
- Genus: Enyalius
- Species: E. catenatus

Binomial name
- Enyalius catenatus (Wied-Neuwied, 1821)

= Enyalius catenatus =

Species of lizard

Enyalius catenatus, Wied's fathead anole, is a species of lizard in the family Leiosauridae. It is endemic to Brazil. They can be found in the Atlantic Forest and can be found in other humid forests.

The body mass can be up to 38.66 g. The species is reproduces sexually and is gonochoric.
