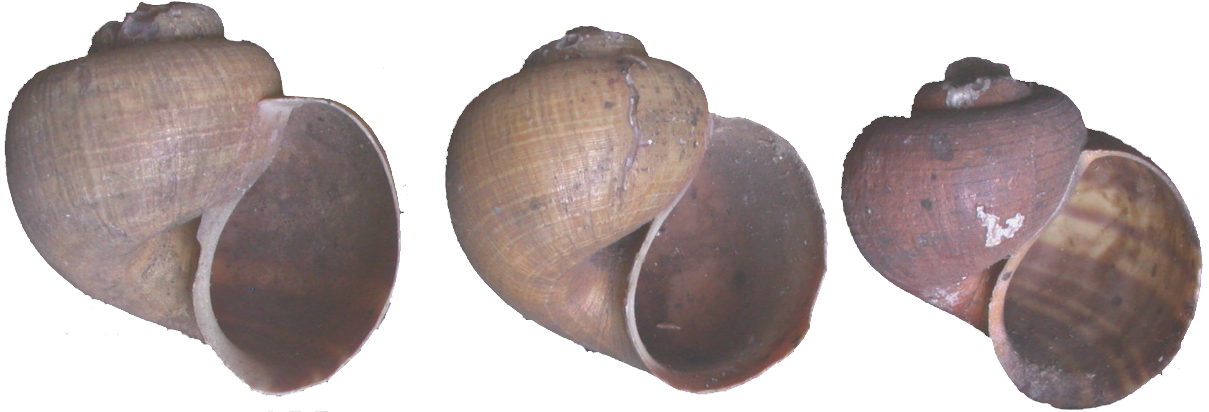

Scientific classification
- Domain: Eukaryota
- Kingdom: Animalia
- Phylum: Mollusca
- Class: Gastropoda
- Subclass: Caenogastropoda
- Order: Architaenioglossa
- Superfamily: Ampullarioidea
- Family: Ampullariidae
- Subfamily: Pomaceinae
- Genus: Pomacea
- Species: P. decussata

Binomial name
- Pomacea decussata Moricand, 1836

Synonyms
- Ampullaria decussata Moricand, 1836 (original combination); Pomacea (Pomacea) decussata (Moricand, 1836) · accepted, alternate representation

= Pomacea decussata =

Species of snail

Pomacea decussata is a species of freshwater snail in the family Ampullariidae.

It was first described by Stéfano Moricand as Ampullaria decussata in 1836. Pomacea commissionis was originally considered a subspecies of P. decussata.
