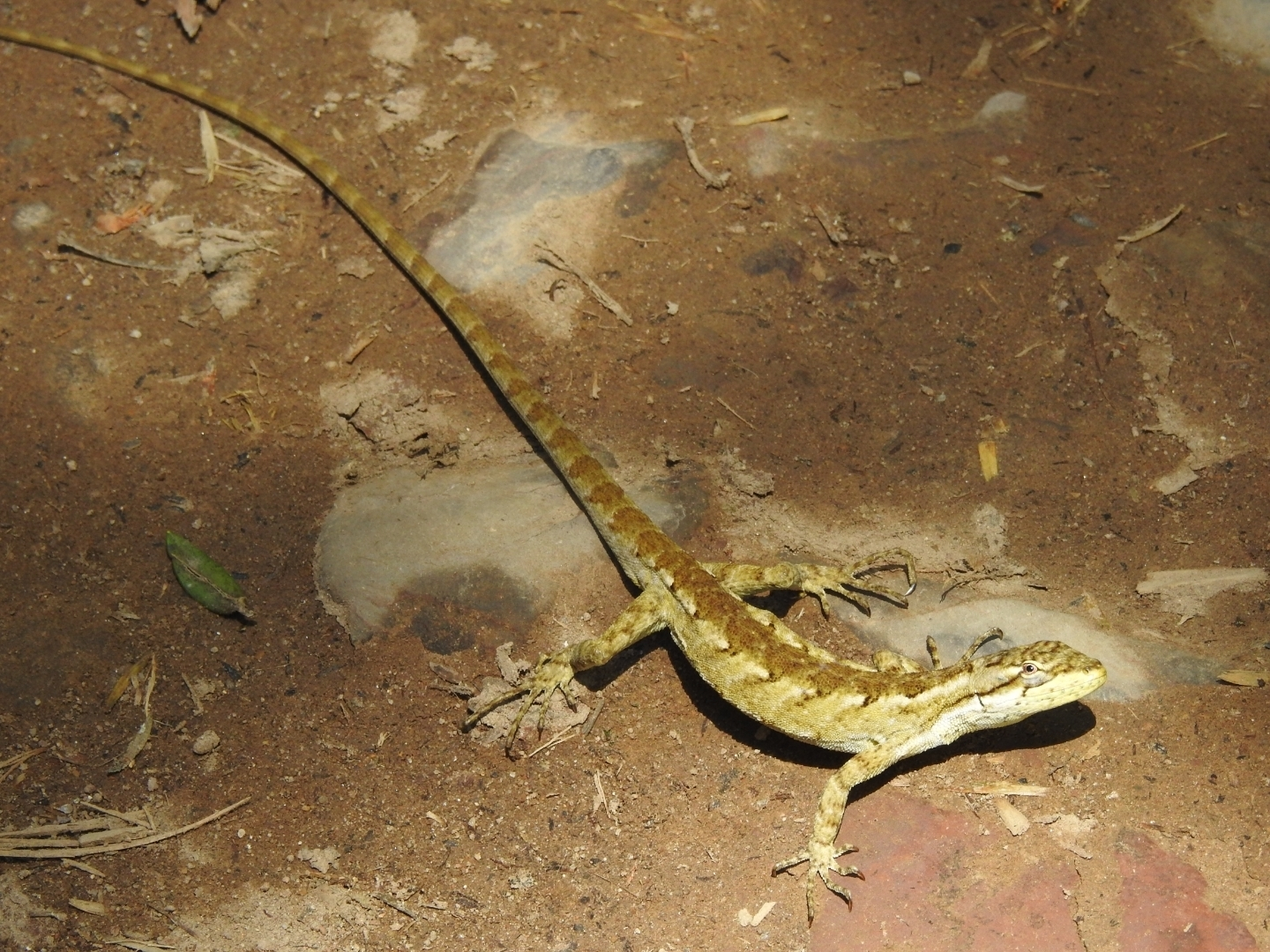

Scientific classification
- Kingdom: Animalia
- Phylum: Chordata
- Class: Reptilia
- Order: Squamata
- Suborder: Iguania
- Family: Leiosauridae
- Genus: Anisolepis; Boulenger, 1885

= Anisolepis =

Genus of lizards

Anisolepis is a small genus of lizards in the family Leiosauridae. The genus is endemic to South America.

== Species ==
Three species are known from South America.

- Anisolepis grilli Boulenger, 1891 – Boulenger's tree lizard
- Anisolepis longicauda (Boulenger, 1891)
- Anisolepis undulatus (Wiegmann, 1834) – Wiegmann's tree lizard

Nota bene: A binomial authority in parentheses indicates that the species was originally described in a genus other than Anisolepis.
