= Anisolepis undulatus =

Wiegmann's tree lizard

Conservation status
- Data Deficient (IUCN 3.1)

Scientific classification
- Kingdom: Animalia
- Phylum: Chordata
- Class: Reptilia
- Order: Squamata
- Suborder: Iguania
- Family: Leiosauridae
- Genus: Anisolepis
- Species: A. undulatus

Binomial name
- Anisolepis undulatus (Wiegmann, 1834)

Synonyms
- Laemanctus undulatus Wiegmann, 1834; Anisolepis iheringii Boulenger, 1885; Anisolepis undulatus — Boulenger, 1886

Species of lizard

Wiegmann's tree lizard (Anisolepis undulatus) is a species of lizard in the family Leiosauridae. The species is endemic to South America.

== Geographic range ==
A. undulatus is found in Argentina, Brazil, and Uruguay.

== Habitat ==
The natural habitat of A. undulatus is temperate forests.

== Reproduction ==
A. undulatus is oviparous.

== Conservation status ==
A. undulatus is threatened by habitat loss.

== Taxonomy and etymology ==
The junior synonym, Anisolepis iheringii, is the type species of the genus Anisolepis. The specific name, iheringii, is in honor of German-Brazilian zoologist Hermann von Ihering.
