= Hermann von Ihering =

German-Brazilian zoologist (1850–1930)

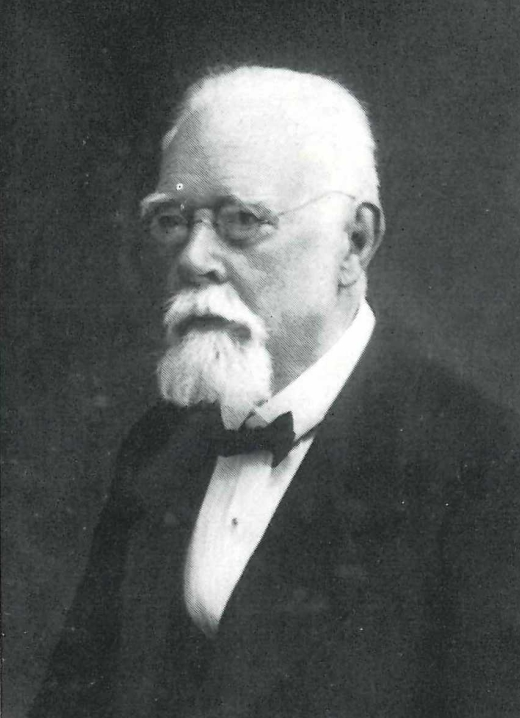
- Hermann von Ihering
- Born: Hermann Friedrich Albrecht von Ihering; 9 October 1850; Kiel, Duchy of Holstein (now Germany)
- Died: 24 February 1930 (aged 79); Gießen, Germany
- Known for: Zoology

Hermann Friedrich Albert von Ihering (Kiel, 9 October 1850 – Giessen, 24 February 1930) was a German Brazilian doctor, professor and ornithologist. He was the oldest son of Rudolf von Jhering.

Between 1893 and 1894, Ihering also helped to found the Museu Paulista, in São Paulo, and became its first director.

== Biography ==
Hermann Friedrich Albert von Ihering was born in 1850 in Kiel, Germany, the oldest son of Rudolf von Jhering (1818-1892), a well-known professor in Göttingen.

The 17 years old Hermann moved to Vienna with his family, but entered the Darmstadt Musketeer Regiment after the start of the Franco-Prussian War, in 1870.

Under the advice of Rudolf Leuckart, Ihering studied medicine at the Giessen, Leipzig, Berlin, and Göttingen universities, working as an assistant at the zoological institute in Göttingen. He concluded his doctoral thesis in Göttingen, with the title Ueber das Wesen der Prognathie und ihr Verlhaeltniss zur Schaedelbasis (On the essence of prognathism and its effect on the base of the skull). He later worked as a Privatdozent for zoology at the Erlangen and Leipzig.

=== Arrival to Brazil ===
On 26 April 1880, Ihering married a widow, Anna Maria Clara Wolff (born von Bezel), who had a 10-year-old boy, Sebastian Wolff, from her first marriage. The marriage was not approved by Ihering's family and, as a result, he travelled to Brazil soon after. He got his first work at the National Museum of Rio de Janeiro, in Rio de Janeiro. However, as he found the climate of Rio de Janeiro too hot, he eventually moved to the city of Taquara, Rio Grande do Sul, where he started to collect specimens to send to museums in Germany and to the British Museum. At this time he had two children, Clara and Rodolpho. Later, he had two more, Wilhelm and Ida, but the latter died as a child.

In 1883, Ihering was nominated travelling naturalist of the National Museum of Rio de Janeiro and lived in several cities by the Lagoa dos Patos. He eventually bought an island at the delta of the Camaquã River, which started to be called Ilha do Doutor (Doctor's Island) and lived there for some years. He was naturalized Brazilian in 1885.

In 1901, his son Rodolpho was sent to Europe to study in Heidelberg. However, his other son, Wilhelm, died soon after, being only 16 years old, and his wife Anna became too shaken by the event and died later in the same year. Rodolpho then abandoned his studies and returned to Brazil to help his father.

During a trip to Europe to visit some colleagues in 1907, Ihering met again his first love, Meta Buff, from Gießen, and married her that same year. Later, during World War I, he was accused of nepotism and of selling to the state a stone that was donated to the Museu Paulista. This forced him to leave his job as director of the museum in 1916. He returned to southern Brazil and continued his studies in Santa Catarina, and in 1918 he was invited to occupy the chair of zoology at the University of Córdoba, Argentina. However, he refused the offer and remained in Brazil in order to organize a small museum in Florianópolis. One year after the museum opened, the government reduced his wage to one third, and three months later it was announced that he would not be paid anymore for his job.

=== Encounter with Pedro II ===
Due to his father's network (and his own), the arrival of Hermann von Ihering at Brazil can be considered atypical, with the scientist being promptly requested to attend an audience with the then Emperor Pedro II of Brazil. About the encounter, the zoologist affirmed: "At the time where the Emperor, one time per week, gave an audience, I went to the palace. A simple anteroom functioned as a waiting room, with the invited ones being prompted to write their name in a book. Two glass doors led to a wooden gallery, one not very pretty, that ran along a courtyard and was protected with glass. (...) When my time arrived, they showed me firstly the gallery where, near a door, I found a gentleman, old and wearing black, that for a hot second I understood him as the master of ceremonies: in reality, he was the Emperor, in the flesh. He greeted me, shaking my hand and asking me to enter a room and sit in a couch, where we talked in French for around 20 minutes. He asked me to speak something about Germany, about my father and about Virchow, for whom he had a great steem, and after started speaking about my plans. He expressed his satisfaction about my permanence in Brazil, for my zoology studies, and offered his help (that is, an armed escort) if I needed to reach more distant territories".

=== Return to Europe and death ===
In 1920, Ihering returned to Europe, living first in Naples and later returning to Germany. In 1921, he settled with Meta in Büdingen. Meta died in 1928 and Ihering died in 1930, at Gießen, Germany.

== Museu Paulista ==
On 7 April 1891, the Museu do Estado was idealized, answering to the Geological and Geographical Commission under the temporary leadership of Albert Löfgren. Soon after, the director of the Geological and Geographical Commission, Orville A. Derby, requested the creation of a zoological wing inside the administrative organ. The proposal was approved and Hermann von Ihering was appointed as its first director on 1893.

A reorganization of the Museum by the government was prompted by the recurrent low-availability of resources and experienced human resources. Two laws were subsequently issued (no. 192, 26 August 1893 and no. 200, 29 August 1893) to with this goal, renaming the Museum to Museu Paulista and moving the facility to the Monument to the Independence of Brazil. The two orders were effected by the next year, with Ihering holding the office of director. The Museu was re-inaugurated at 7 September 1895 by a solemn ceremony.

The Museu Paulista was, during Ihering's administration, primarily destined to Natural History, although a focus on national history was present due to the facility's location. A large collection of natural specimens and historical artifacts is present, with some still lacking precise chronological data.

In the last ten years, numerous theses and monographs were written about Museu Paulista, mainly about Ihering's direction of the institution, that prioritized Natural History, or Afonso d'Escragnolle Taunay's tenure, which included a increasingly historical character in the museum.

== Homage ==
Several species were named in honor of Ihering, including the following.

- Anisolepis iheringii Boulenger, 1885 (lizard), type species of the genus Anisolepis Boulenger, 1885, but a junior synonym of Anisolepis undulatus (Wiegmann, 1834)
- Brucepattersonius iheringi (Thomas, 1896) (rodent)
- Bryconamericus iheringii (Boulenger, 1887) (fish)
- Choeradoplana iheringi Graff, 1899 (land planarian)
- Enyalius iheringii Boulenger 1885 (lizard)
- Gastrocopta iheringi (Suter, 1900) (gastropod)
- Grammostola iheringi Keyserling, 1891 (tarantula)
- Hypostomus hermanni (Ihering, 1905) (catfish, named by his son)
- Myrmotherula iheringi Snethlage, 1914 (antbird)
- Phyllomedusa iheringii Boulenger, 1885 (frog)
- Phalloptychus iheringii (Boulenger, 1889) (fish), junior synonym for Phalloptychus januarius (Hensel, 1868)
- Trinomys iheringi (Thomas, 1911) (Ihering's Atlantic spiny rat)
- Unio iheringi Wright 1898 (freshwater mussel)
- Unionicola iheringi (Koenike, 1890) (water mite)

The peer-reviewed scientific journal Iheringia was also named after him.

== Bibliography ==
His bibliography include 310 works; 20 of these works are about birds.

He was the author of Catálogos da Fauna Brasileira (1907) with his son Rodolpho von Ihering.

- (1877). Vergleichende Anatomie des Nervensystemes und Phylogenie der Mollusken. Leipzig: Engelmann. x + 290 pp. + Plates I-VIII. (in German).
- (1880). "Beiträge zur Kenntniss der Nudibranchien des Mittelmeeres. Part 1. (1. Chromodoris, 2. Doriopsis, 3. Cadlina.)" Malakozoologische Blätter N.F. 2: 57-112. (in German).
- (1886). "Zur kenntnis der Nudibranchien der brasilianischen kuste. Jahrbücher der Deutschen ". Malakozoologischen Gesellschaft 13 (3): 223–240. (in German).
- (1886). "Beiträge zur Kenntniss der Nudibranchien des Mittelmeeres, Part 2. 4. Die Polyceraden ". Malakozoologische Blätter N.F. 8: 12–48. (in German).
- (1904). The Anthropology of the state of S. Paulo, Brazil.
- (1922). Phylogenie und System der Mollusken. (in German).

== See also ==
- Category:Taxa named by Hermann von Ihering
