= Leiosaurus catamarcensis =

Conservation status
- Least Concern (IUCN 3.1)

Scientific classification
- Kingdom: Animalia
- Phylum: Chordata
- Class: Reptilia
- Order: Squamata
- Suborder: Iguania
- Family: Leiosauridae
- Genus: Leiosaurus
- Species: L. catamarcensis

Binomial name
- Leiosaurus catamarcensis Koslowsky, 1898

Species of lizard

Leiosaurus catamarcensis is a species of lizard in the family Leiosauridae. It is native to Argentina.
