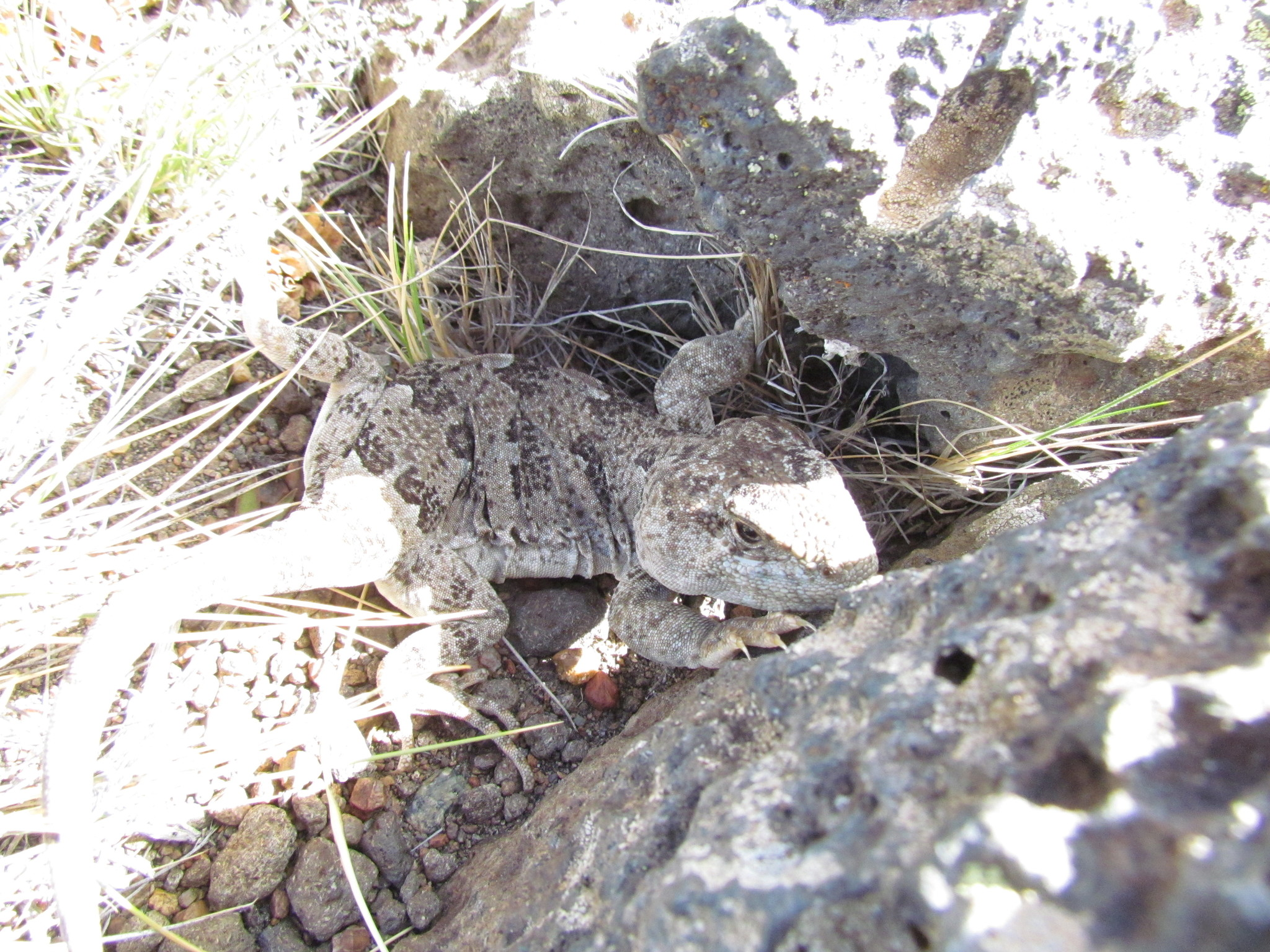

Conservation status
- Least Concern (IUCN 3.1)

Scientific classification
- Kingdom: Animalia
- Phylum: Chordata
- Class: Reptilia
- Order: Squamata
- Suborder: Iguania
- Family: Leiosauridae
- Genus: Diplolaemus
- Species: D. darwinii

Binomial name
- Diplolaemus darwinii Bell, 1843
- Red = D. darwinii Yellow = D. leopardinus Green = D. sextinctus Blue = D. bibronii

= Darwin's iguana =

Species of lizard

Diplolaemus darwinii, also commonly known as Darwin's iguana and the southern Patagonian lizard, is a species of lizard in the family Leiosauridae. The species is native to the southern tip of South America.

== Etymology ==
Both the specific name, darwinii, and the common name, Darwin's iguana, are in honor of Charles Darwin, who was an English naturalist and the author of On the Origin of Species.

== Geographic range ==
D. darwinii is found in the Patagonian Desert in southern Argentina and Chile.

== Description ==
Darwin's iguana has a broad, triangular head and strong jaws.

== Diet ==
The diet of D. darwinii mostly consists of insects and other small invertebrates.

== Habitat ==
The preferred natural habitat of D. darwinii is the Patagonian steppes from sea level up to elevations of 700 m (2,297 ft).

== Reproduction ==
D. darwinii is oviparous.

== Conservation status ==
The IUCN has listed Darwin's iguana as being of "Least Concern" because of its wide range and the lack of any identified threats to the species.
