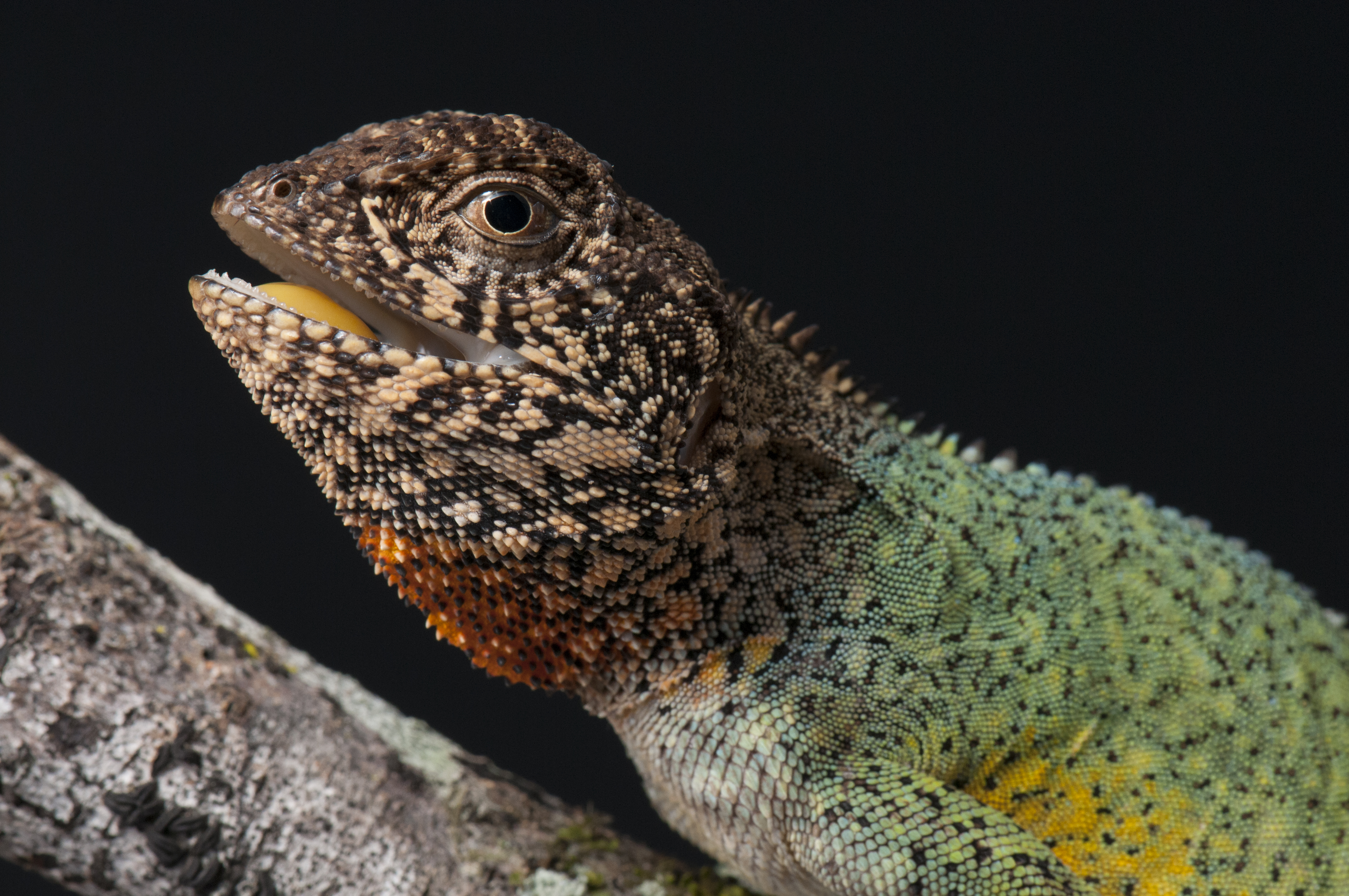
- Enyalius catenatus

Scientific classification
- Kingdom: Animalia
- Phylum: Chordata
- Class: Reptilia
- Order: Squamata
- Suborder: Iguania
- Family: Leiosauridae
- Genus: Enyalius; Wagler, 1830

= Enyalius (lizard) =

Genus of lizards

Enyalius is a genus of lizards in the family Leiosauridae. The genus is native to Brazil and Uruguay.

Species in the genus Enyalius are mostly insectivorous (meaning they eat insects and other invertebrates), diurnal (active during the day), and arboreal (inhabit trees). There are eleven known species of this genus. The reproductive timing for the species E. perditus occurs typically in warm and wet seasons and is typically shorter than other species of this genus. These lizards lay eggs and have a clutch size (number of eggs laid at one time) of about 3–11.

== Species ==
- Enyalius bibronii Boulenger, 1885
- Enyalius bilineatus (A.M.C. Duméril & Bibron, 1837) – two-lined fathead anole
- Enyalius boulengeri Etheridge, 1969 – Brazilian fathead anole
- Enyalius brasiliensis (Lesson, 1830) – Brazilian fathead anole
- Enyalius capetinga Breitman et al., 2018
- Enyalius catenatus (Wied, 1821) – Wied's fathead anole
- Enyalius erythroceneus Rodrigues, de Freitas, Silva & Bertolotto, 2006
- Enyalius iheringii Boulenger, 1885 – Ihering's fathead anole
- Enyalius leechii (Boulenger, 1885) – Leech's fathead anole
- Enyalius perditus Jackson, 1978
- Enyalius pictus (Schinz, 1822)

Nota bene: A binomial authority in parentheses indicates that the species was originally described in a genus other than Enyalius.
