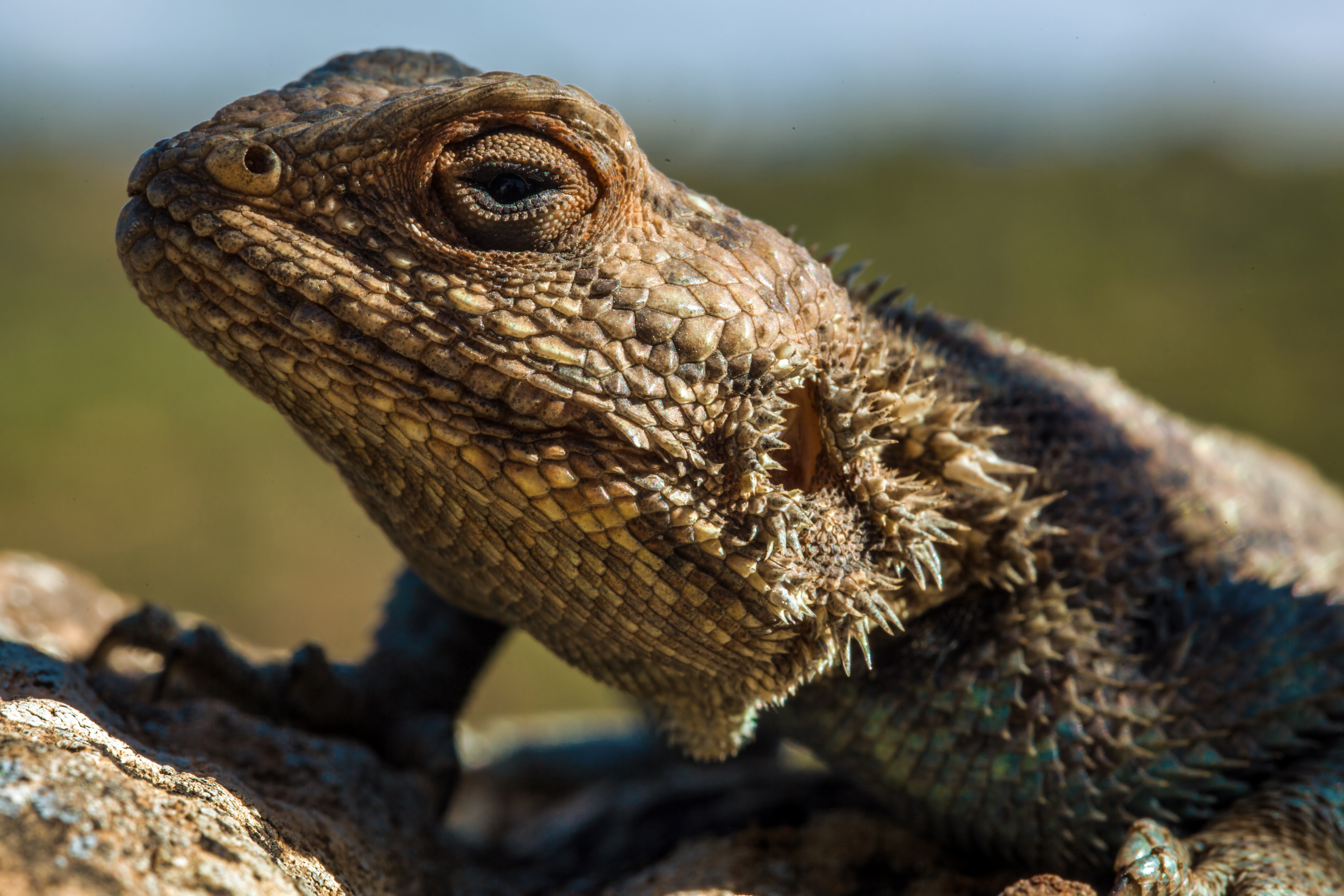

Conservation status
- Least Concern (IUCN 3.1)

Scientific classification
- Kingdom: Animalia
- Phylum: Chordata
- Class: Reptilia
- Order: Squamata
- Suborder: Iguania
- Family: Agamidae
- Genus: Agama
- Species: A. bibronii

Binomial name
- Agama bibronii Duméril, 1851
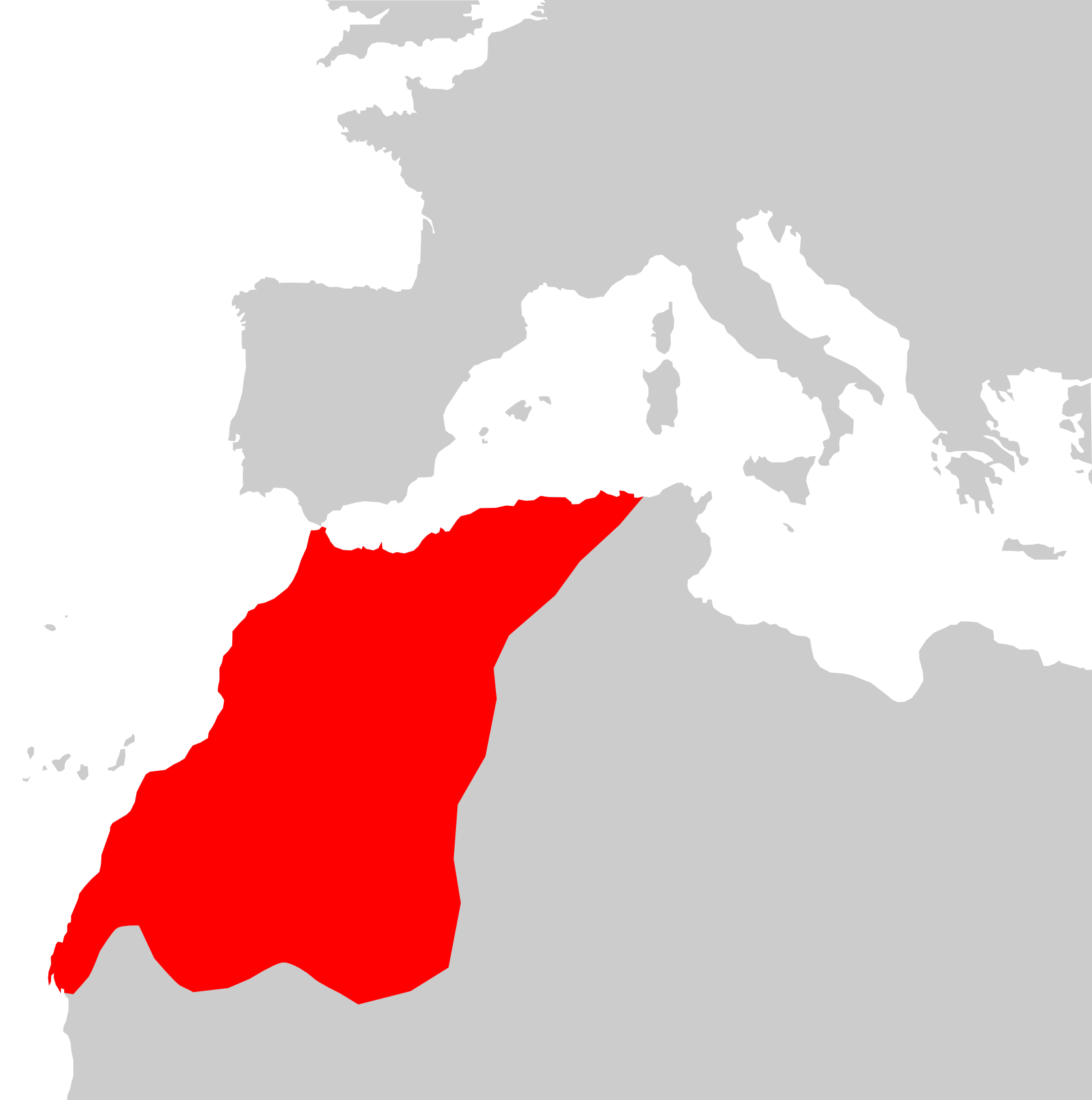

Synonyms
- Agama impalearis Boettger, 1874

= Agama bibronii =

Species of lizard

Agama bibronii, Bibron's agama or the North African rock agama, is a species of lizard belonging to the family Agamidae from north western Africa.

== Description ==
Agama bibronii is a medium-sized lizard, growing to up to 25–30 cm (9.8–12 in) in total length, 15 cm (5.9 in) of which is made up of the cylindrical tail. The dorsal scales are relatively large and each scale is the same size as all the others, it has some spikes on its neck and on the side of the head while the throat is wrinkled. The males are larger than the females. The dorsal surface is greyish green and is marked with brown spots while the head is blue with orange rims around the eyes. When breeding, the male's head and body turn coppery-orange while the rest of the body turning purplish-blue with paler rings on the tail. The females are mainly bluish grey with their backs coloured orangey-yellow and marked with red stripes. The colour can also vary because of age or exposure to the sun. Juveniles have tubercles where the spikes will grow when they are adult.

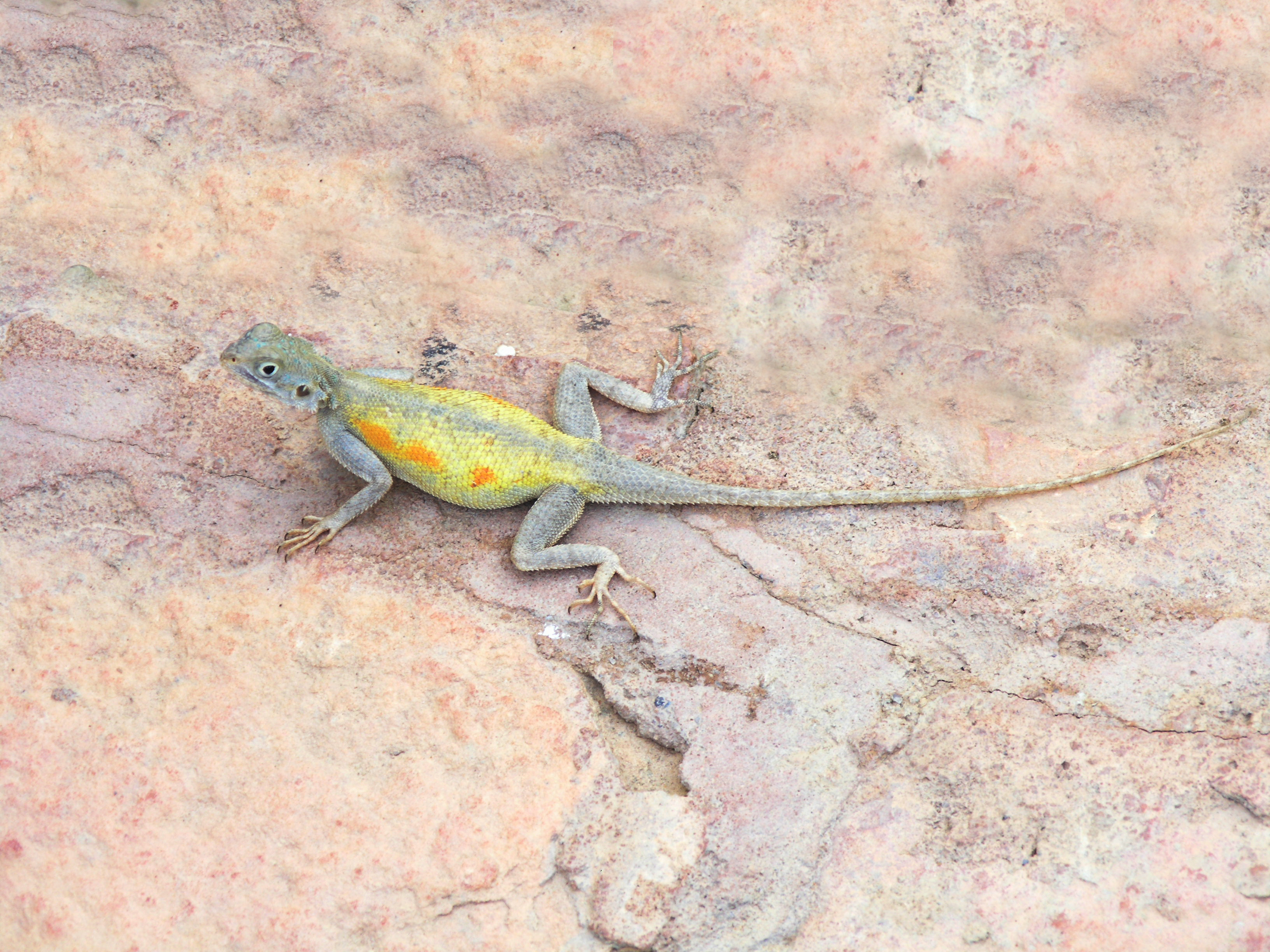
Agama bibronii

== Distribution ==
Agama bibronii is found in north western Africa with its distribution centred on Morocco but it extends south to Western Sahara and east into eastern Algeria as far as east as Batna Province in northeastern Algeria. It may also occur in the Zemmour Massif in northern Mauritania.

== Habitat and ecology ==
Agama bibronii occurs in rocky areas, where it is diurnal, its main prey are arthropods but it will take small lizards as well as feeding on plant material. In Morocco it is thought that these lizards eat flowers mainly for the moisture content. It has also been recorded from Mediterranean type vegetation, steppe, and areas of suitable habitat at the margins of cultivated land. One-third to half of all females lay two clutches of eggs per year, the remainder lay one. Each clutch contains between six and 23 eggs, with a mean number of 14 eggs. The breeding season falls between late April and early September and the females begin to breed in their first year; 1–2-year-old females are the commonest age for breeding. It is a good climber over trees and rocks and is tolerant of high temperatures and exposure to the sun, although in the hottest part of the day in midsummer they may retreat to shade. When they feel threatened they can rapidly flee to a hiding place between rocks or under a shrub. In habitats where there is abundant prey and plenty of shelter these lizards can occur at high densities. Its main predators are snakes and raptors and if it cannot flee to a shelter it will play dead. The night is spent in a burrow excavated under a large stone, in a bank or an under embankment, the main burrow is less than one metre in length and may have several side galleries. When not foraging the males use a rock or a pile of rocks as a lookout to monitor their territory, each territory being 100 to 500 square meters (1,100 to 5,400 sq ft) in extent.

When breeding if two males encounter one another they display by making themselves look as big as possible, swelling the throat and pushing the anterior portion of the body up with the front legs in an attempt to intimidate the other male. The other male either flees or begins a fight where the males circle each other and use their tails as weapons until one gives up and runs away. The male approaches a female in breeding condition with circular movements, then the female signals her readiness to mate by arching her back and raising her body and tail, the male then bites the nape of her neck and copulates with her. The eggs complete much of their development within the female and are laid into a moist substrate. Their does not appear to be nay parental care and the eggs hatch after 60 days.

== Taxonomy ==
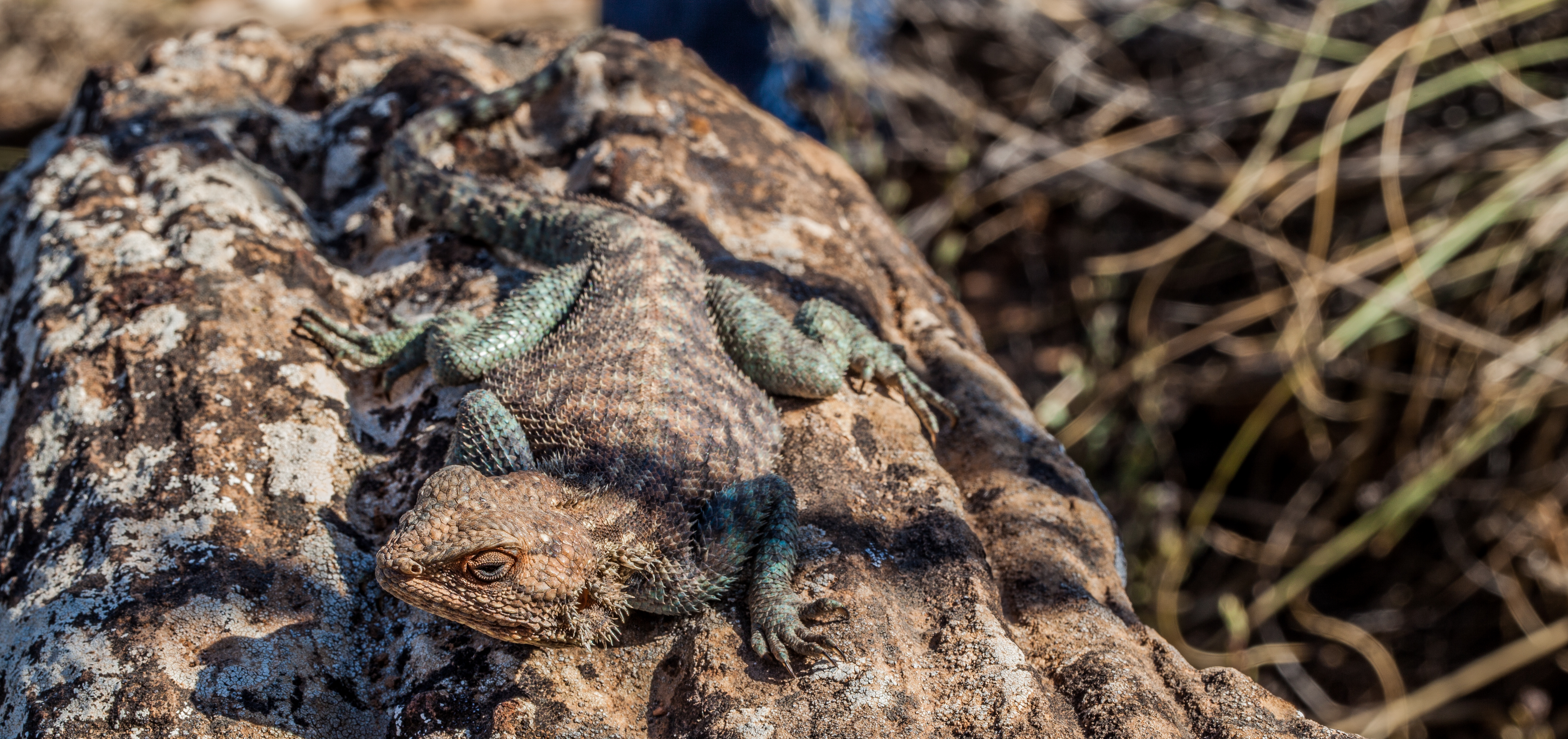
Reptile of Mount Belezma, Batna Province, Algeria

Agama bibronii was first formally described in 1851 by André Marie Constant Duméril but this name was thought to be preoccupied by the South African Trapelus (Psammorrhoa) bibronii which was described by Leopold Fitzinger in 1843. The species was frequently referred to by the synonym A. impalearis, however, a ruling of the International Commission on Zoological Nomenclature in 1970 suppressed Fitzinger's name, so the correct name for this species is Agama bibronii. However, some authorities still use A. impalearis and treat A. bibronii as a synonym.

The specific name honours the French herpetologist Gabriel Bibron who originally described the species but did not give it a specific name, Bibron's handwritten description was partly reproduced in the book written by Duméril and his son, Auguste Duméril in 1851, entitled Catalogue méthodique de la collection des reptiles du Muséum d'Histoire Naturelle de Paris, in which Duméril named the species.

Genetic studies have confirmed the existence of two distinct clades of Agama bibronii, one on the north and west of the Atlas Mountains and the other to the south and east. There is some intergrade between the two forms but there are consistent morphological differences as well as clear differences in mitochondrial DNA which suggest that these forms may represent separate species.

== Conservation ==
Agama bibronii is a wide-ranging species with no known threats. It is regularly found in the European pet trade but collection of specimens for this trade is not considered to be at any risk to the species.
