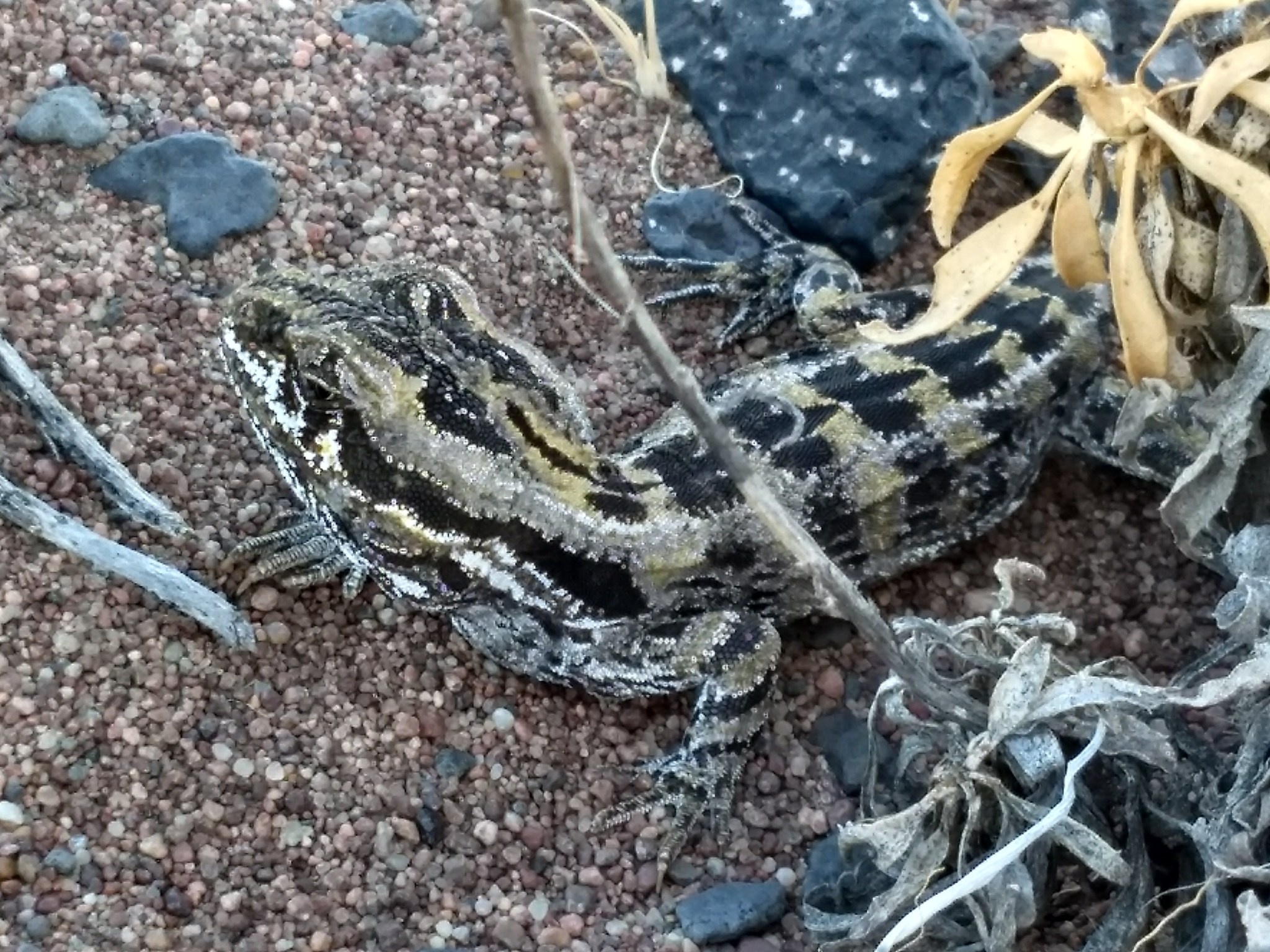
- Leiosaurus bellii

Scientific classification
- Kingdom: Animalia
- Phylum: Chordata
- Class: Reptilia
- Order: Squamata
- Suborder: Iguania
- Family: Leiosauridae
- Genus: Leiosaurus; A.M.C. Duméril & Bibron, 1837

Synonyms
- Aperopristis Peracca, 1897; Liosaurus [sic] — Boulenger, 1885

= Leiosaurus =

Genus of lizards

Leiosaurus is a genus of lizards in the family Leiosauridae. The genus is endemic to South America.

== Species ==
The genus Leiosaurus contains the following species which are recognized as being valid:

- Leiosaurus bellii A.M.C. Duméril & Bibron, 1837 – Bell's anole
- Leiosaurus catamarcensis Koslowsky, 1898
- Leiosaurus jaguaris Laspiur, Acosta & Abdala, 2007
- Leiosaurus paronae (Peracca, 1897)

Nota bene: A binomial authority in parentheses indicates that the species was originally described in a genus other than Leiosaurus.

== Etymology ==
The specific name, bellii, is in honor of English zoologist Thomas Bell, and the specific name, paronae, is in honor of Italian zoologist Corrado Parona.
