= Iheringia =

- Discipline: Zoology, botanics
- Language: English, Portuguese, Spanish
- Edited by: Lezilda Carvalho Torgan (Sér. Bot.)

Publication details
- History: 1958–present
- Publisher: Museu de Ciências Naturais da Fundação Zoobotânica do Rio Grande do Sul (Brazil)

Standard abbreviations
- ISO 4: Iheringia

Indexing
- ISSN: 0073-4721
- OCLC no.: 423484394

Links
- Série Zoologia; Série Botânica

Ilheringia is a peer-reviewed scientific journal composed of two series dealing with zoology and botany: Série Zoologia and Série Botânica.
