= Gabriel Bibron =

French zoologist and herpetologist (1805–1848)

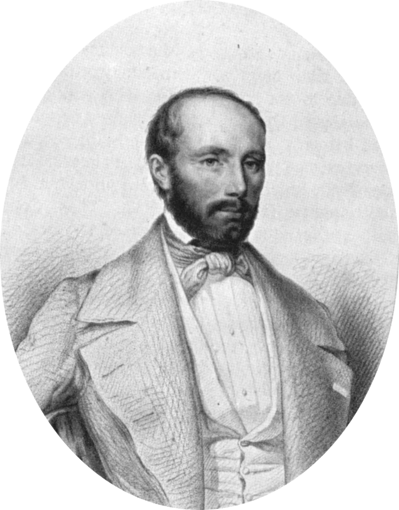
- Born: 20 October 1805; Paris, France
- Died: 27 March 1848 (aged 42); Saint-Alban-les-Eaux, France
- Scientific career
- Fields: Zoology, Herpetology
- Author abbrev. (zoology): Bibron

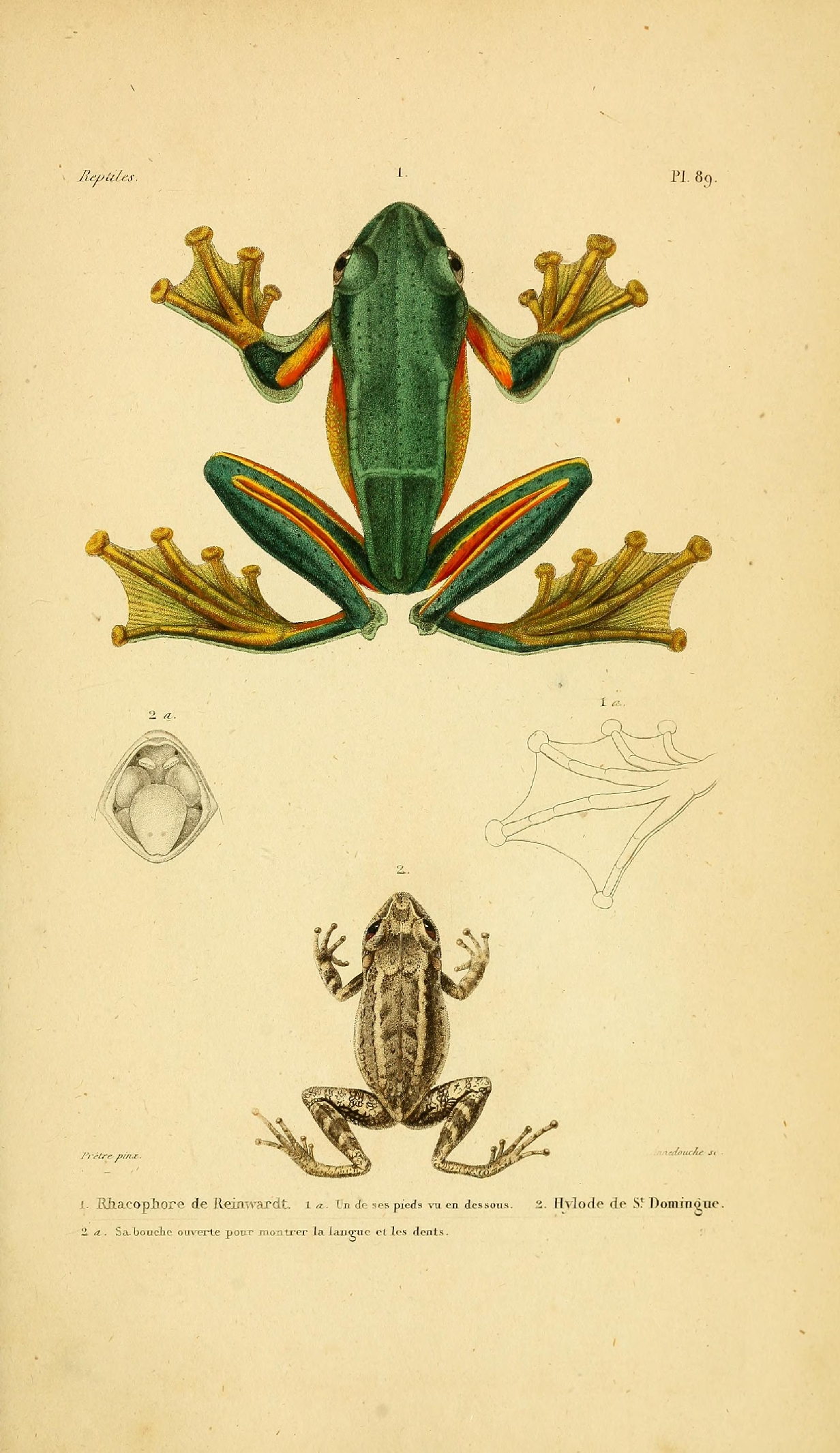
Plate 89 from Erpétologie Générale

Gabriel Bibron (French: [ɡabʁijɛl bibʁɔ̃]; 20 October 1805 – 27 March 1848) was a French zoologist and herpetologist. He was born in Paris. The son of an employee of the Museum national d'histoire naturelle, he had a good foundation in natural history and was hired to collect vertebrates in Italy and Sicily. Under the direction of Jean Baptiste Bory de Saint-Vincent (1778–1846), he took part in the Morea expedition to Peloponnese.

He classified numerous reptile species with André Marie Constant Duméril (1774–1860), whom he had met in 1832. Duméril was interested mainly in the relations between genera, and he left to Bibron the task of describing the species. Working together they produced the Erpétologie Générale, a comprehensive account of the reptiles, published in ten volumes from 1834 to 1854. Also, Bibron assisted Duméril with teaching duties at the museum and was an instructor at a primary school in Paris.

Bibron married Jeanne Belloc, sister of Jean-Hilaire Belloc, in 1842. Bibron contracted tuberculosis and retired in 1845 to Saint-Alban-les-Eaux, where he died aged 42.

== Taxa named in honor of Bibron ==
Bibron is commemorated in the scientific names of ten species of reptiles.

- Afrotyphlops bibronii, a blind snake
- Atractaspis bibroni, a venomous snake
- Calliophis bibroni, a venomous snake
- Candoia bibroni, a boa
- Chondrodactylus bibronii, a gecko
- Diplolaemus bibronii, a lizard
- Enyalius bibronii, a lizard
- Eutropis bibronii, a skink
- Liolaemus bibronii, a lizard
- Pelochelys bibroni, a turtle

An eleventh species, which was more commonly known as Agama impalearis, had been named Agama bibronii by André Marie Constant Duméril in 1851, however a decision by the ICZN in 1971 confirmed that the correct name was A. bibroni.
