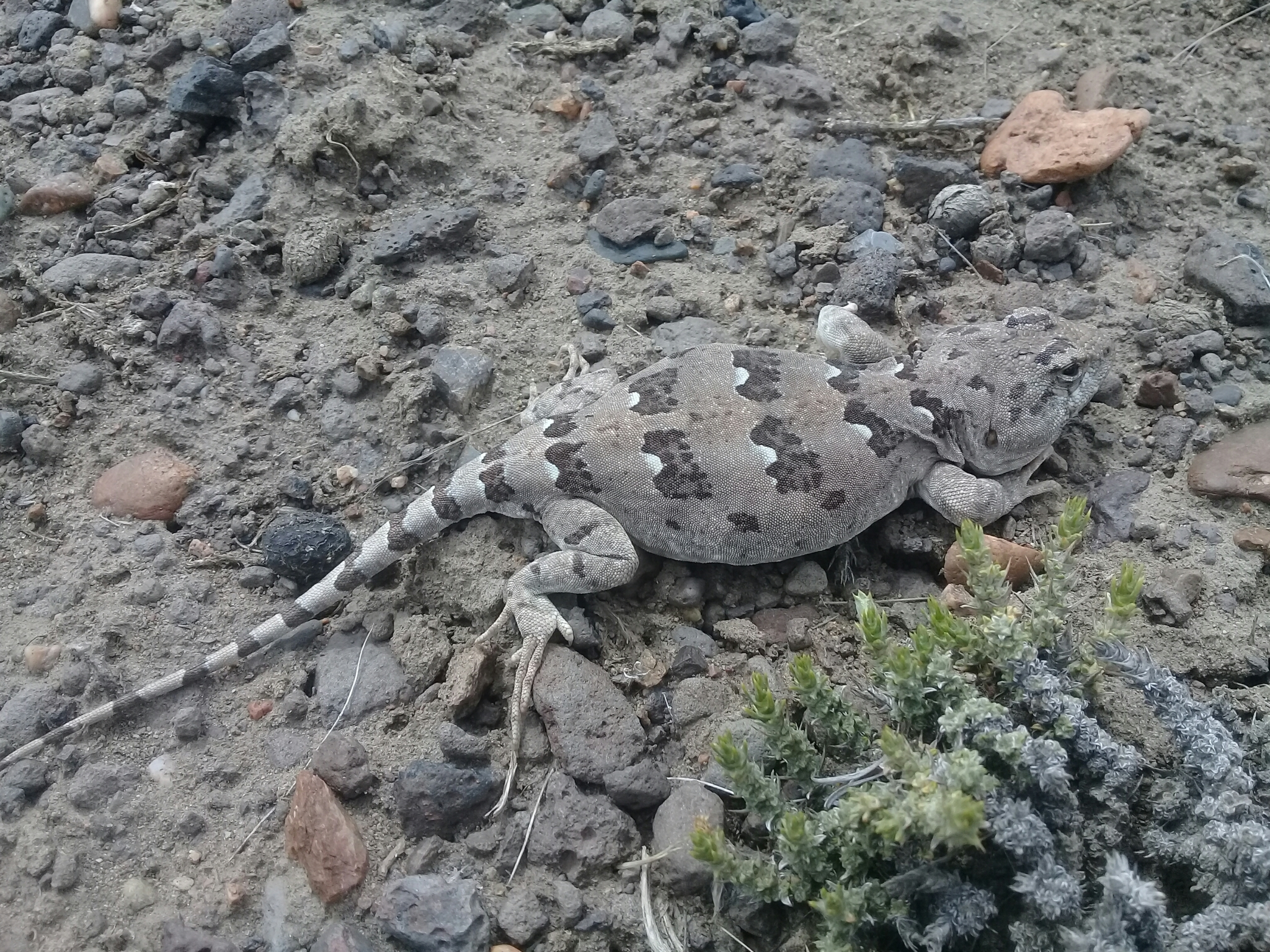
- Diplolaemus bibronii

Scientific classification
- Kingdom: Animalia
- Phylum: Chordata
- Class: Reptilia
- Order: Squamata
- Suborder: Iguania
- Infraorder: Pleurodonta
- Family: Leiosauridae; Frost, Etheridge, Janies, & Titus, 2001

= Leiosauridae =

Family of lizards

Leiosauridae is a family of iguanian lizards containing six genera and 34 species. The family is endemic to Central America and South America.

== Taxonomy ==
A 2022 phylogenetic study found the Leiosauridae to be the sister taxa to the Opluridae, a unique family of iguanians endemic to Madagascar, and one of only two pleurodont lineages found outside the Americas (the other being the genus Brachylophus). This called into question the previous hypothesis of Opluridae being the last members of an ancient lineage of Gondwanan iguanians, as the study found that the Leiosauridae and Opluridae only diverged during the Paleocene, about 60 million years ago. Opluridae are now thought to have colonized Madagascar via oceanic dispersal from South America, either directly or indirectly.

== Genera ==
The family Leiosauridae contains the following genera:

Genus	Image	Type species	Taxon author	Common name	Species
Anisolepis		A. undulatus (Wiegmann, 1834)	Boulenger, 1885	Tree lizards	3
Diplolaemus	D. darwinii	D. darwinii Bell, 1843	Bell, 1843	Patagonian lizards	4
Enyalius	E. catenatus	E. catenatus (Wied, 1821)	Wagler, 1830	Fathead anoles	11
Leiosaurus	L. bellii	L. bellii Duméril & Bibron, 1837	Duméril & Bibron, 1837	Smooth iguanas	4
Pristidactylus	P. achalensis	P. fasciatus (d'Orbigny & Bibron, 1837)	Fitzinger, 1843	Big-headed iguanas	10
Urostrophus		U. vautieri Duméril & Bibron, 1837	Duméril & Bibron, 1837	Steppe iguanas	2
