= Perivitellins =

Perivitellins are egg proteins found in the perivitelline fluid of many gastropods. They are multifunctional complexes providing the developing embryo with nutrition, protection from the environment, and defense against predators.

Despite the central role perivitellins play in reproduction and development, there is little information about their role in gastropod Molluscs. Most studies of perivitellins have been performed in eggs of Ampullaridae, a family of freshwater snails (Caenogastropoda), notably the Pomacea genus, mostly those of Pomacea canaliculata, Pomacea scalaris and Pomacea maculata.

== Synthesis ==
Perivitellins are almost exclusively synthesized in the albumen gland (also known as albumen gland-capsule gland complex or uterine gland), an accessory gland from the female reproductive system of gastropods. This has been experimentally confirmed for the perivitellins ovorubin (PcOvo) and PcPV2, which were only found in the albumen gland with no extra-gland synthesis, circulation or storage. During the reproductive season, these perivitellins are transferred to eggs. After oviposition, they are rapidly restored in the albumen gland, decreasing their total amount in the gland only after repeated ovipositions. In Pomacea canaliculata snails, perivitellins would act, together with the polysaccharide galactogen, as a limiting factor of the reproductive effort during reproduction.

== Types of perivitellins ==
The first studies performed in Pomacea canaliculata identified two proteins named perivitellin-1, PV1 or ovorubin (now called PcOvo) and perivitellin-2 or PV2 massively accumulated in eggs, comprising 60-70% of total protein, respectively, and a heterogeneous fraction dubbed perivitellin-3 or PV3 fraction. Recent proteomic analyses of perivitelline fluids, however, identified a total of 34 proteins from Pomacea canaliculata, 38 in Pomacea maculata, and 32 in Pomacea diffusa.

Perivitellin-1 or PcOvo (former ovorubin) and perivitellin-2 or PcPV2 are probably the best characterized from snails. Both perivitellins are multimeric and glycosylated proteins with remarkable thermal stability up to 100°C and 60°C, respectively, and over a wide range of pH. They are also highly resistant to the combined action of pepsin and trypsin proteases.

The perivitelline fluid of Pomacea scalaris and Pomacea diffusa contain one major perivitellin, PsSC (also named scalarin) and PdPV1, respectively, which are structurally and phylogenetically related to PcOvo. The perivitelline fluid of P. maculata is also similar, with two major perivitellins, PmPV1 and PmPV2, structurally and functionally similar to PcOvo and PcPV2, respectively.

The rest of Pomacea perivitellins (over 25) have been characterized at the transcriptomic and proteomic levels, but biochemical studies are still largely missing.

== Perivitellin functions ==
Perivitellins provide nutrition, energy storage, defense against predation, and protection from the environment to the developing embryo.

A functional classification of the perivitellin aminoacid sequences based on the Kyoto Encyclopedia of Genes and Genomes (KEGG), classified them in "environmental information processing", among which several immune proteins are included, "metabolism", "organismal systems", "cellular processes", "other", and a considerable number of "unknown" proteins.

The first functional studies performed in Pomacea canaliculata, considered them mostly as storage proteins that provided energetic and structural precursors for the embryos, since they are consumed during development.

Later research on PV1s (PcOvo, PmPV1, and PsSC) reported that their carotenoid cofactor, notably astaxanthin, serves as a potent antioxidant and provides the reddish color to the eggs. These carotenoproteins are also highly resistant to gastrointestinal digestion, and withstand the passage through the digestive system without significant modifications; this characteristic was related to embryo defenses, deterring predators by lowering the nutritional value of the eggs. PcOvo and PsSC also carry phosphate groups attached to serine residues that may serve as a phosphorus reserve for the embryo. Unlike PcOvo and PmPV1, PsSC is also an active lectin that agglutinates bacteria and alters the gastrointestinal mucosa of rats, functions associated with embryo protection against both pathogens and predators.

PV2s are toxins only found in Pomacea canaliculata (PcPV2) and Pomacea maculata (PmPV2) perivitelline fluid. They are potent neurotoxins when intraperitoneally injected to mice, while exerting enterotoxic functions when ingested. Each of the two dimeric units of either PcPV2 or PmPV2 consists of a carbohydrate-binding protein of the tachylectin family (acting as a targeting module) disulfide-linked to a pore-forming subunit of the Membrane Attack Complex and Perforin (MACPF) subfamily (toxic module). These toxins bear a structural resemblance to botulinic and ricin heterodimeric toxins, the so-called "AB toxins" previously known only in bacteria and plants. Perivitellin-2 is also resistant to gastrointestinal digestion, which contributes to lowering the egg nutritional value.

Finally, a recent study of Pomacea canaliculata PV3 fraction identified and characterized two protease inhibitors from the Kunitz and Kazal families, a function also related to an antipredator defense since it would prevent predators to digest proteins from the eggs when ingested.
