= Scalarin =

Identifiers
- Organism: Pomacea scalaris (apple snail)
- Symbol: PsSC

Scalarin (PsSC) is the most abundant perivitellin of the perivitelline fluid from Pomacea scalaris eggs. This glyco-lipo-caroteno protein is an approx. 380 kDa multimer combining multiple copies of six different 24-35 kDa subunits.

As part of the petivitelline fluid, PsSC is probably playing a role as a nutrient source for the developing embryo in Pomacea scalaris eggs. As its orthologous ovorubin and PmPV1, this protein carries and stabilizes carotenoid pigments. As a consequence, this perivitellin absorbs light throughout the visible range, a characteristic related to a photoprotective role in these aerially deposited eggs. The presence on its structure of carotenoid pigments is also associated with protective antioxidative properties.

Like most other studied perivitellins from Pomacea snails, PsSC is highly stable in a wide range of pH values and withstands gastrointestinal digestion, characteristics associated with an antinutritive defense system that deters predation by lowering the nutritional value of the eggs.

Unlike ovorubin and PmPV1, PsSC is an active, strong lectin, recognizing glycosphingolipids (notably, the gangliosides GD1b, GT1b, and GD1a) and AB0 group antigens. Due to this activity, PsSC agglutinates red blood cells (notably those from rabbits and human A and B groups) as well as Gram-negative bacteria, indicating a putative immune role of this perivitellin. PsSC also binds to intestinal cells in culture and, when ingested, alters the morphophysiology of rat intestinal mucosa increasing its absorptive surface by elongating and narrowing villi, further supporting its role in a defense system against predation.
