= PmPV1 =

Pomacea maculata perivitellin-1

Identifiers
- Organism: Pomacea maculata (giant apple snail)
- Symbol: PmPV1
- Alt. symbols: PV1
- UniProt: A0A1L6BRS1
Search for
- Structures: Swiss-model
- Domains: InterPro

Pomacea maculata perivitellin-1 (PmPV1) is the most abundant perivitellin found in the perivitelline fluid from Pomacea maculata snail eggs. This glyco-lipo-caroteno protein is an approx. 294 kDa multimer of a combination of multiple copies of six different~30 kDa subunits. PmPV1 account >60% of the total proteins found in the Pomacea maculata eggs.

PmPV1 is an orthologous of ovorubin and scalarin, sharing most of the structural features with the former protein and cross-reacting with anti-ovorubin polyclonal antibodies. Like ovorubin and scalarin, PmPV1 is highly glycosylated (~13% w/w) and carries carotenoid pigments, indicating that this perivitellin would probably have the antioxidant, photoprotective, aposematic and water retention functions described for its orthologous.

PmPV1 is a kinetically stable protein that, like most other studied perivitellins from Pomacea snails, is highly stable in a wide range of pH values and withstands gastrointestinal digestion, characteristics associated with an antinutritive defense system that deters predation by lowering the nutritional value of the eggs. Remarkably, and in agreement with this antinutritive activity, PmPV1 withstands in vivo digestion, being recovered structurally unaltered from mice feces after trespassing the whole digestive system.
