= C18H32O16 =

The molecular formula C_{18}H_{32}O_{16} (molar mass: 504.42 g/mol, exact mass: 504.1690 u) may refer to:

- Maltotriose
- Melezitose, or melicitose
- Raffinose
- Galactogen
