= Polysaccharide =

Long carbohydrate polymers such as starch, glycogen, cellulose, and chitin

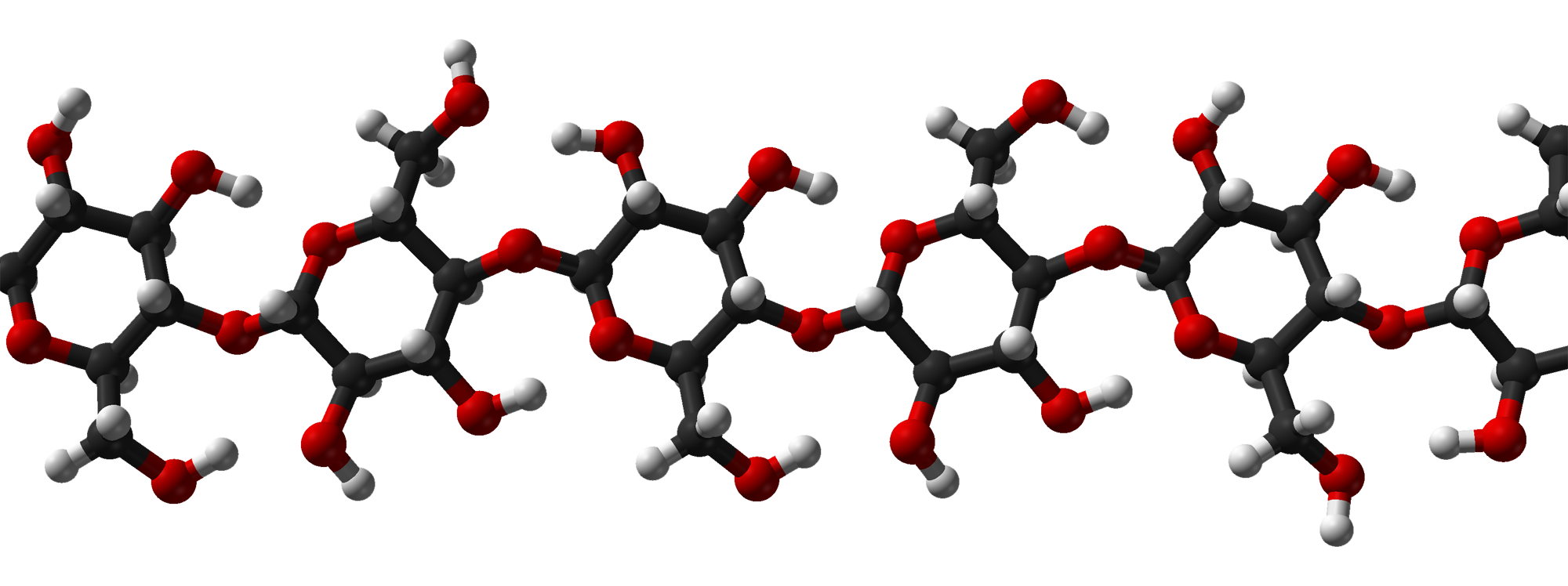
3D structure of cellulose, a beta-glucan polysaccharide

Amylose is a linear polymer of glucose mainly linked with α(1→4) bonds. It can be made of several thousands of glucose units. It is one of the two components of starch, the other being amylopectin.

Polysaccharides (/ˌpɒl.i.ˈsæk.ə.raɪd/; from Ancient Greek πολύς (polús) 'many, much' and σάκχαρ (sákkhar) 'sugar') are "compounds consisting of a large number of monosaccharides linked glycosidically". They are the most abundant carbohydrates in food. Their structures range from linear to highly branched polymers. Examples include storage polysaccharides such as starch, glycogen, and galactogen and structural polysaccharides such as hemicellulose and chitin. The term "glycan" is synonymous with polysaccharide, but often glycans are discussed in the context of glycoconjugates, i.e. hybrids of polysaccharides and proteins or lipids.

Polysaccharides are often heterogeneous, containing slight modifications of the repeating unit. They may be amorphous (e.g. starch) or insoluble in water (e.g. cellulose).

Saccharides are generally composed of simple carbohydrates called monosaccharides with the general formula (CH_{2}O)_{n} where n is three or more. Examples of monosaccharides are glucose, fructose, and glyceraldehyde. Polysaccharides, meanwhile, have a general formula of C_{x}(H_{2}O)_{y} where x and y are usually large numbers between 200 and 2500. When the repeating units in the polymer backbone are six-carbon monosaccharides, as is often the case, the general formula simplifies to (C_{6}H_{10}O_{5})_{n}, where typically 40 ≤ n ≤ 3000. Polysaccharides are highly branched. In fact, starch holds I2iodine molecules in the helical portion. The starch-I2 is dark blue in colour. Cellulose does not contain complex helices and hence cannot hold I2; as a result, a colour change is not observed when placed in an I2-dye. This colour-changing property is a unique character test for polysaccharides

As a rule of thumb, polysaccharides contain more than ten monosaccharide units, whereas oligosaccharides contain three to ten monosaccharide units, but the precise cutoff varies according to the convention. Polysaccharides are an important class of biological polymers. Their function in living organisms is usually either structure- or storage-related. Starch (a polymer of glucose) is used as a storage polysaccharide in plants, being found in the form of both amylose and the branched amylopectin. In animals, the structurally similar glucose polymer is the more densely branched glycogen, sometimes called "animal starch". Glycogen's properties allow it to be metabolized more quickly, which suits the active lives of moving animals. In bacteria, they play an important role in bacterial multicellularity.

Cellulose and chitin are examples of structural polysaccharides. Cellulose is used in the cell walls of plants and other organisms and is said to be the most abundant organic molecule on Earth. It has many uses such as a significant role in the paper and textile industries and is used as a feedstock for the production of rayon (via the viscose process), cellulose acetate, celluloid, and nitrocellulose. Chitin has a similar structure but has nitrogen-containing side branches, increasing its strength. It is found in arthropod exoskeletons and in the cell walls of some fungi. It also has multiple uses, including surgical threads. Polysaccharides also include callose or laminarin, chrysolaminarin, xylan, arabinoxylan, mannan, fucoidan, and galactomannan.

== Cellulose and dietary fiber ==
=== Structure ===
Nutritional polysaccharides are common sources of energy. Many organisms can easily break down starches into glucose. By contrast, few organisms can metabolize cellulose. Some bacteria and protists can metabolize these carbohydrate types. Ruminants and termites, for example, use microorganisms to process cellulose.

Some polysaccharides are not very digestible, but in the form of dietary fiber, they enhance digestion. Soluble fiber binds to bile acids in the small intestine, making them less likely to enter the body; this, in turn, lowers cholesterol levels in the blood. Soluble fiber also attenuates the absorption of sugar, reduces sugar response after eating, normalizes blood lipid levels and, once fermented in the colon, produces short-chain fatty acids as byproducts with wide-ranging physiological activities (discussion below). Although insoluble fiber is associated with reduced diabetes risk, the mechanism by which this occurs is unknown.

Dietary fiber is nevertheless regarded as important for the diet, with regulatory authorities in many developed countries recommending increases in fiber intake.

== Storage polysaccharides ==
=== Starch ===
Starch is a glucose polymer in which glucopyranose units are bonded by alpha-linkages. It is made up of a mixture of amylose (15–20%) and amylopectin (80–85%). Amylose consists of a linear chain of several hundred glucose molecules, and amylopectin is branched made of several thousand glucose units (every chain of 24–30 glucose units is one unit of Amylopectin). Starches are insoluble in water. They can be digested by breaking the alpha-linkages (glycosidic bonds). Humans and other animals have amylases so that they can digest starches. Potato, rice, wheat, and maize are major sources of starch in the human diet. The formations of starches are the ways that plants store glucose.

=== Glycogen ===
Glycogen serves as the secondary long-term energy storage in animal and fungal cells, with the primary energy stores being held in adipose tissue. Glycogen is made primarily by the liver and the muscles, but can also be made by glycogenesis within the brain and stomach.

Glycogen is analogous to starch and is sometimes referred to as animal starch, having a similar structure to amylopectin but more extensively branched and compact than starch. Glycogen is a polymer of α(1→4) glycosidic bonds linked with α(1→6)-linked branches. Glycogen is found in the form of granules in the cytosol/cytoplasm in many cell types and plays an important role in the glucose cycle. Glycogen forms an energy reserve that can be quickly mobilized to meet a sudden need for glucose, but one that is less compact and more immediately available as an energy reserve than triglycerides (lipids).

In the liver hepatocytes, glycogen comprises up to 8 percent (100–120 grams in an adult) of the fresh weight soon after a meal. Only the glycogen stored in the liver can be made accessible to other organs. In the muscles, glycogen is found in a low concentration of one to two percent of the muscle mass. The amount of glycogen stored in the body—especially within the muscles, liver, and red blood cells—varies with physical activity, basal metabolic rate, and eating habits such as intermittent fasting. Small amounts of glycogen are found in the kidneys and even smaller amounts in certain glial cells in the brain and white blood cells. The uterus also stores glycogen during pregnancy to nourish the embryo.

Glycogen is composed of a branched chain of glucose residues. It is primarily stored in the liver and muscles.

- It is an energy reserve for animals.
- It is the chief form of carbohydrate stored in animal organisms.
- It is insoluble in water. It turns brown-red when mixed with iodine.
- It also yields glucose on hydrolysis.
Schematic 2-D cross-sectional view of glycogen. A core protein of glycogenin is surrounded by branches of glucose units. The entire globular granule may contain approximately 30,000 glucose units.

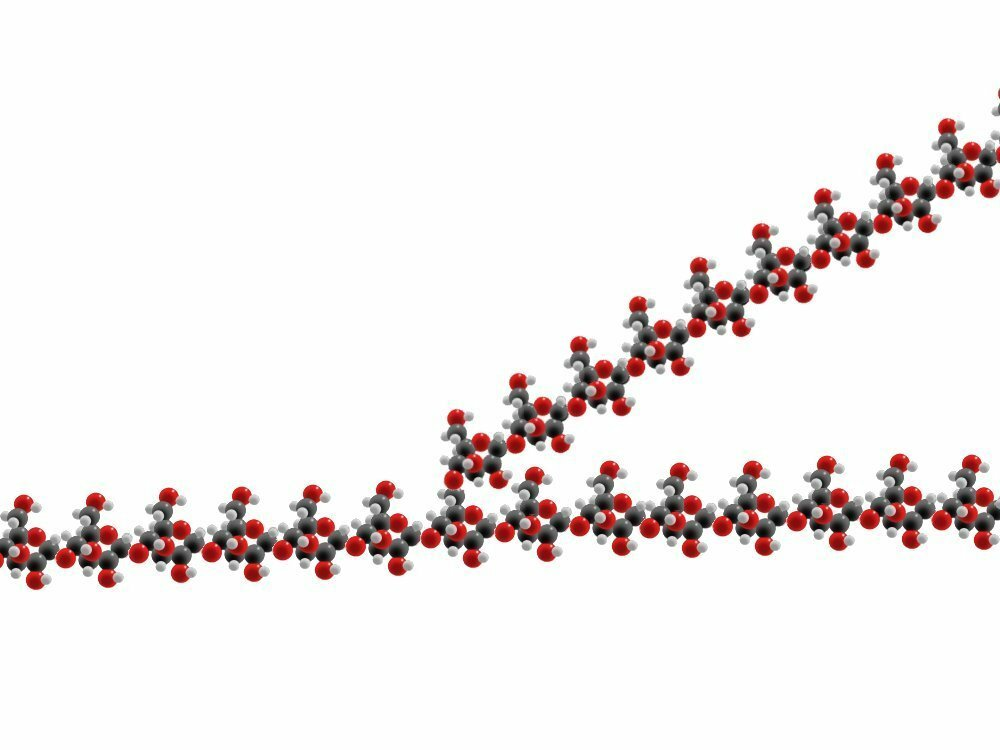
A view of the atomic structure of a single branched strand of glucose units in a glycogen molecule.

=== Galactogen ===
Galactogen is a polysaccharide of galactose that also functions as energy storage in pulmonate snails and some Caenogastropoda. This polysaccharide is exclusive of the reproduction and is only found in the albumen gland from the female snail reproductive system and in the perivitelline fluid of egogens have applications within hydrogel structures. These hydrogel structures can be designed to release particular nanoparticle pharmaceuticals and/or encapsulated therapeutics over time or in response to environmental stimuli.

Formed by crosslinking polysaccharide-based nanoparticles and functional polymers, galactogens have applications within hydrogel structures. These hydrogel structures can be designed to release particular nanoparticle pharmaceuticals and/or encapsulated therapeutics over time or in response to environmental stimuli.

Galactogens are polysaccharides with binding affinity for bioanalytes. With this, by end-point attaching galactogens to other polysaccharides constituting the surface of medical devices, galactogens have use as a method of capturing bioanalytes (e.g., CTC's), a method for releasing the captured bioanalytes and an analysis method.

=== Inulin ===
Inulin is a naturally occurring polysaccharide complex carbohydrate composed of fructose, a plant-derived food that human digestive enzymes cannot completely break down. The inulins belong to a class of dietary fibers known as fructans. Inulin is used by some plants as a means of storing energy and is typically found in roots or rhizomes. Most plants that synthesize and store inulin do not store other forms of carbohydrates such as starch. In the United States in 2018, the Food and Drug Administration approved inulin as a dietary fiber ingredient used to improve the nutritional value of manufactured food products.

== Structural polysaccharides ==
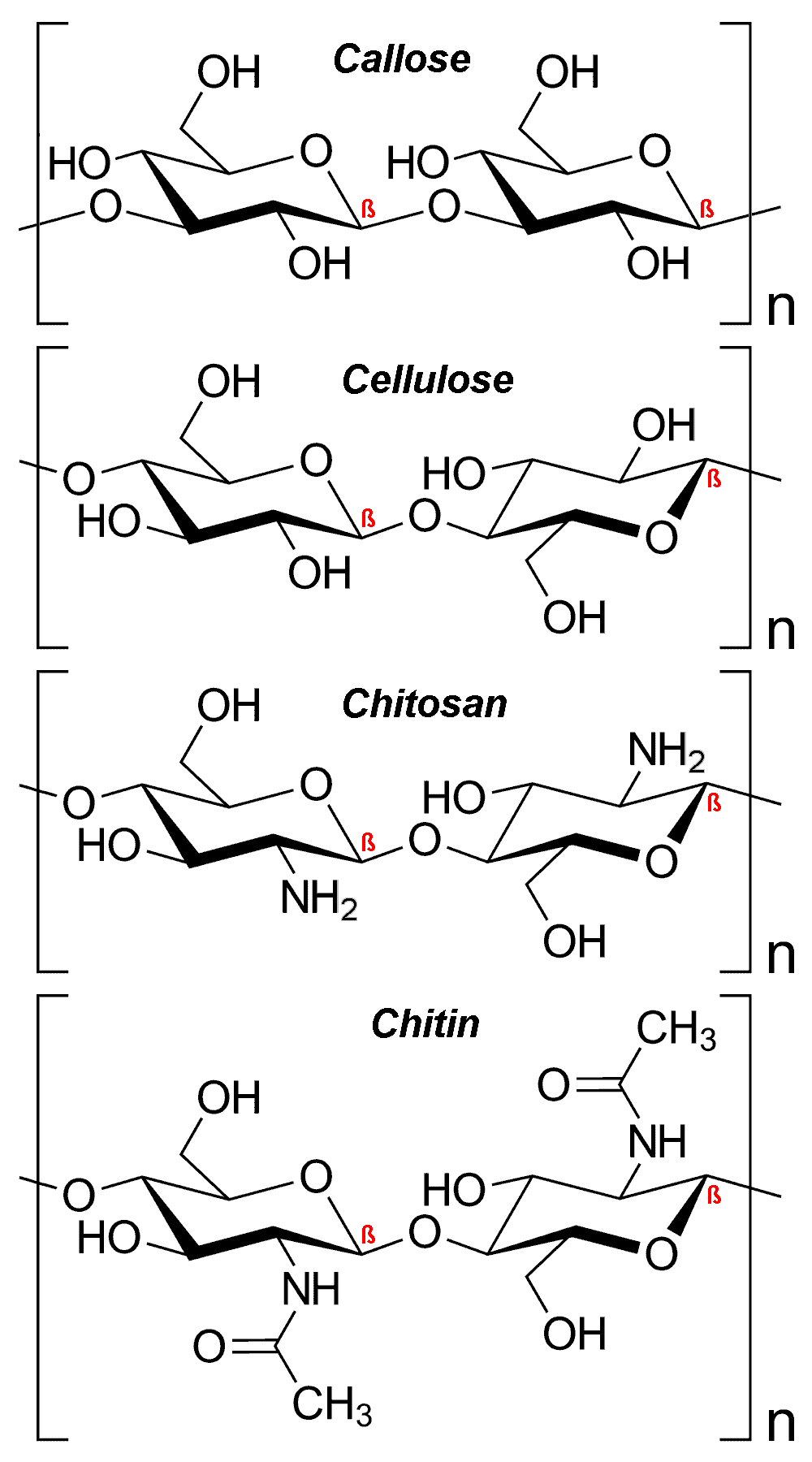
Some important natural structural polysaccharides

=== Arabinoxylans ===
Arabinoxylans are found in both the primary and secondary cell walls of plants and are the copolymers of two sugars: arabinose and xylose. They may also have beneficial effects on human health.

=== Cellulose ===
The structural components of plants are formed primarily from cellulose. Wood is largely cellulose and lignin, while paper and cotton are nearly pure cellulose. Cellulose is a polymer made with repeated glucose units bonded together by beta-linkages. Humans and many animals lack an enzyme to break the beta-linkages, so they do not digest cellulose. Certain animals, such as termites can digest cellulose, because bacteria possessing the enzyme are present in their gut. Cellulose is insoluble in water. It does not change color when mixed with iodine. On hydrolysis, it yields glucose. It is the most abundant carbohydrate in nature.

=== Chitin ===
Chitin forms a structural component of many animals, such as exoskeletons of insects. It biodegrades in the presence of enzymes called chitinases, secreted by microorganisms such as bacteria and fungi and produced by some plants. Some of these microorganisms have receptors to simple sugars from the decomposition of chitin. If chitin is detected, they then produce enzymes to digest it by cleaving the glycosidic bonds in order to convert it to simple sugars and ammonia.

Chemically, chitin is closely related to chitosan (a more water-soluble derivative of chitin). It is also closely related to cellulose in that it is an unbranched chain of glucose derivatives. Both materials contribute structure and strength, protecting the organism.

=== Pectins ===
Pectins are a family of complex polysaccharides that contain 1,4-linked α-D-galactosyl uronic acid residues. They are present in most primary cell walls and in the nonwoody parts of terrestrial plants.

== Acidic polysaccharides ==
Acidic polysaccharides are polysaccharides that contain carboxyl groups, phosphate groups and/or sulfuric ester groups.

Polysaccharides containing sulfate groups can be isolated from algae or obtained by chemical modification.

Polysaccharides are major classes of biomolecules. They are long chains of carbohydrate molecules, composed of several smaller monosaccharides. These complex bio-macromolecules functions as an important source of energy in animal cell and form a structural component of a plant cell. It can be a homopolysaccharide or a heteropolysaccharide depending upon the type of the monosaccharides.

Polysaccharides can be a straight chain of monosaccharides known as linear polysaccharides, or it can be branched known as a branched polysaccharide.

== Bacterial polysaccharides ==
Pathogenic bacteria commonly produce a bacterial capsule, a thick, mucus-like layer of polysaccharide. The capsule cloaks antigenic proteins on the bacterial surface that would otherwise provoke an immune response and thereby lead to the destruction of the bacteria. Capsular polysaccharides are water-soluble, commonly acidic, and have molecular weights on the order of 100000 to 2000000 Da. They are linear and consist of regularly repeating subunits of one to six monosaccharides. There is enormous structural diversity; nearly two hundred different polysaccharides are produced by E. coli alone. Mixtures of capsular polysaccharides, either conjugated or native, are used as vaccines.

Bacteria and many other microbes, including fungi and algae, often secrete polysaccharides to help them adhere to surfaces and to prevent them from drying out. Humans have developed some of these polysaccharides into useful products, including xanthan gum, dextran, welan gum, gellan gum, diutan gum and pullulan.

Most of these polysaccharides exhibit useful visco-elastic properties when dissolved in water at very low levels. This makes various liquids used in everyday life, such as some foods, lotions, cleaners, and paints, viscous when stationary, but much more free-flowing when even slight shear is applied by stirring or shaking, pouring, wiping, or brushing. This property is named pseudoplasticity or shear thinning; the study of such matters is called rheology.

Viscosity of Welan gum
Shear rate (rpm)	Viscosity (cP or mPa⋅s)
0.3	23330
0.5	16000
1	11000
2	5500
4	3250
5	2900
10	1700
20	900
50	520
100	310

Aqueous solutions of the polysaccharide alone have a curious behavior when stirred: after stirring ceases, the solution initially continues to swirl due to momentum, then slows to a standstill due to viscosity and reverses direction briefly before stopping. This recoil is due to the elastic effect of the polysaccharide chains, previously stretched in solution, returning to their relaxed state.

Cell-surface polysaccharides play diverse roles in bacterial ecology and physiology. They serve as a barrier between the cell wall and the environment, mediate host-pathogen interactions. Polysaccharides also play an important role in formation of biofilms and the structuring of complex life forms in bacteria like Myxococcus xanthus.

These polysaccharides are synthesized from nucleotide-activated precursors (called nucleotide sugars) and, in most cases, all the enzymes necessary for biosynthesis, assembly and transport of the completed polymer are encoded by genes organized in dedicated clusters within the genome of the organism. Lipopolysaccharide is one of the most important cell-surface polysaccharides, as it plays a key structural role in outer membrane integrity, as well as being an important mediator of host-pathogen interactions.

The enzymes that make the A-band (homopolymeric) and B-band (heteropolymeric) O-antigens have been identified and the metabolic pathways defined. The exopolysaccharide alginate is a linear copolymer of β-1,4-linked D-mannuronic acid and L-guluronic acid residues, and is responsible for the mucoid phenotype of late-stage cystic fibrosis disease. The pel and psl loci also encode exopolysaccharides found to be important for biofilm formation. Rhamnolipid is a biosurfactant whose production is tightly regulated at the transcriptional level, but the precise role that it plays in disease is not well understood at present. Protein glycosylation, particularly of pilin and flagellin, became a focus of research by several groups from about 2007, and has been shown to be important for adhesion and invasion during bacterial infection.

== Chemical identification tests for polysaccharides ==
=== Periodic acid-Schiff stain (PAS) ===
Polysaccharides with unprotected vicinal diols or amino sugars (where some hydroxyl groups are replaced with amines) give a positive periodic acid-Schiff stain (PAS). The list of polysaccharides that stain with PAS is long. Although mucins of epithelial origins stain with PAS, mucins of connective tissue origin have so many acidic substitutions that they do not have enough glycol or amino-alcohol groups left to react with PAS.

== Derivatives ==
By chemical modifications certain properties of polysaccharides can be improved. Various ligands can be covalently attached to their hydroxyl groups. Due to the covalent attachment of methyl-, hydroxyethyl- or carboxymethyl- groups on cellulose, for instance, high swelling properties in aqueous media can be introduced.

Another example is thiolated polysaccharides. (See thiomers.) Thiol groups are covalently attached to polysaccharides such as hyaluronic acid or chitosan. As thiolated polysaccharides can crosslink via disulfide bond formation, they form stable three-dimensional networks. Furthermore, they can bind to cysteine subunits of proteins via disulfide bonds. Because of these bonds, polysaccharides can be covalently attached to endogenous proteins such as mucins or keratins.

== See also ==
- Glycan
- Oligosaccharide nomenclature
- Polysaccharide encapsulated bacteria
