= Galactogen 6beta-galactosyltransferase =

Class of enzymes

galactogen 6-beta-galactosyltransferase

Identifiers
- EC no.: 2.4.1.205
- CAS no.: 88273-54-5

Databases
- IntEnz: IntEnz view
- BRENDA: BRENDA entry
- ExPASy: NiceZyme view
- KEGG: KEGG entry
- MetaCyc: metabolic pathway
- PRIAM: profile
- PDB structures: RCSB PDB PDBe PDBsum
- Gene Ontology: AmiGO / QuickGO
Search
- PMC: articles
- PubMed: articles
- NCBI: proteins

In enzymology, a galactogen 6beta-galactosyltransferase (EC 2.4.1.205) is an enzyme that catalyzes the chemical reaction

UDP-galactose + galactogen $\rightleftharpoons$ UDP + 1,6-beta-D-galactosylgalactogen

Thus, the two substrates of this enzyme are UDP-galactose and galactogen, whereas its two products are UDP and 1,6-beta-D-galactosylgalactogen.

This enzyme belongs to the family of glycosyltransferases, specifically the hexosyltransferases. The systematic name of this enzyme class is UDP-galactose:galactogen beta-1,6-D-galactosyltransferase. Other names in common use include uridine diphosphogalactose-galactogen galactosyltransferase, 1,6-D-galactosyltransferase, and beta-(1–6)-D-galactosyltransferase.
