= Galactogen =

- Example trisaccharide substructure of galactogen, showing β (1→3) and β (1→6) links

Names
- IUPAC name beta-D-galacto-hexopyranosyl-(1->3)-[beta-D-galacto-hexopyranosyl-(1->6)]-beta-D-galacto-hexopyranose

Identifiers
| CAS Number | monomer: 121123-33-9 |
| 3D model (JSmol) | monomer: Interactive image |
| ChEBI | monomer: CHEBI:16883 |
| ChemSpider | monomer: 2733405 |
| KEGG | monomer: C01698 |
| PubChem CID | monomer: 46173715 |
| CompTox Dashboard (EPA) | DTXSID20392999 |
- InChI: monomer: InChI=1S/C18H32O16/c19-1-4-7(21)10(24)12(26)17(32-4)30-3-6-9(23)15(14(28)16(29)31-6)34-18-13(27)11(25)8(22)5(2-20)33-18/h4-29H,1-3H2/t4-,5-,6-,7+,8+,9+,10+,11+,12-,13-,14-,15+,16-,17-,18+/m1/s1 Key: KJZMZIMBDAXZCX-FKZYWASWSA-N
- SMILES: monomer: C([C@@H]1[C@@H]([C@@H]([C@H]([C@@H](O1)OC[C@@H]2[C@@H]([C@@H]([C@H]([C@@H](O2)O)O)O[C@H]3[C@@H]([C@H]([C@H]([C@H](O3)CO)O)O)O)O)O)O)O)O
- Except where otherwise noted, data are given for materials in their standard state (at 25 °C [77 °F], 100 kPa). Infobox references

Galactogen is a polysaccharide of galactose that functions as energy storage in pulmonate snails and some Caenogastropoda. This polysaccharide is exclusive of the reproduction and is only found in the albumen gland from the female snail reproductive system and in the perivitelline fluid of eggs.

Galactogen serves as an energy reserve for developing embryos and hatchlings, which is later replaced by glycogen in juveniles and adults. The advantage of accumulating galactogen instead of glycogen in eggs remains unclear, although some hypotheses have been proposed (see below).

== Occurrence and distribution ==
Galactogen has been reported in the albumen gland of pulmonate snails such as Helix pomatia, Limnaea stagnalis, Oxychilus cellarius, Achatina fulica, Aplexa nitens and Otala lactea, Bulimnaea megasoma, Ariolimax columbianis, Ariophanta, Biomphalaria glabrata, and Strophochelius oblongus. This polysaccharide was also identified in the Caenogastropoda Pila virens and Viviparus, Pomacea canaliculata, and Pomacea maculata.

In adult gastropods, galactogen is confined to the albumen gland, showing a large variation in content during the year and reaching a higher peak in the reproductive season. During the reproductive season, this polysaccharide is rapidly restored in the albumen gland after being transferred to the eggs, decreasing its total amount only after repeated ovipositions. In Pomacea canaliculata snails, galactogen would act, together with perivitellins, as a main limiting factor of reproduction. This polysaccharide has been identified in the Golgi zone of the secretory cells from the albumen gland in the form of discrete granules 200 Å in diameter. The appearance of galactogen granules within the secretory globules suggests that this is the site of biosynthesis of the polysaccharide.

Apart from the albumen gland, galactogen is also found as a major component of the perivitelline fluid from the snail eggs, comprising the main energy source for the developing embryo.

== Structure ==
Galactogen is a polymer of galactose with species-specific structural variations. In this polysaccharide, the D-galactose are predominantly β (1→3) and β (1→6) linked; however some species also have β (1→2) and β (1→4). The galactogen of the aquatic Basommatophora (e.g. Lymnaea, Biomphalaria) is highly branched with only 5-8 % of the sugar residues in linear sections, and β(1→3) and β(1→6) bonds alternate more-or-Iess regularly. In the terrestrial Stylommatophora (e.g. Helix, Arianta, Cepaea, Achatina) up to 20% of the sugar residues are linear β(1→3) bound. The galactogen of Ampullarius sp species has an unusually large proportion of linearly arranged sugars, with 5% β(1→3), 26% β(1→6), and 10% β(1→2). Other analyses in Helix pomatia suggested a dichotomous structure, where each galactopyranose unit bears a branch or side chain.

Molecular weight determinations in galactogen extracted from the eggs of Helix pomatia and Limnaea stagnalis were estimated in 4 million and 2.2 million, respectively. In these snails galactogen contains only D-galactose. Depending upon the origin of the galactogen, apart from D-galactose, L-galactose, L-fucose, D-glucose, L-glucose and phosphate residues may also be present; for instance, the galactogen from Ampullarius sp. contains 98% of D-galacotose and 2% of L- fucose, and the one isolated from Pomacea maculata eggs consist in 68% of D-galactose and 32% of D-glucose. Phosphate-substituted galactose residues are found in the galactogen of individual species from various snail genera such as Biomphalaria, Helix and Cepaea. Therefore, current knowledge indicates it could be considered either a homopolysaccharide of or a heteropolysaccharide dominated by galactose.

== Metabolism ==
Galactogen is synthesized by secretory cells in the albumen gland of adult female snails and later transferred to the egg. This process is under neurohormonal control, notably by the brain galactogenin. The biochemical pathways for glycogen and galactogen synthesis are closely related. Both use glucose as a common precursor and its conversion to activated galactose is catalyzed by UDP-glucose 4-epimerase and galactose-1-P uridyl-transferase. This enables glucose to be the common precursor for both glycogenesis and galactogenesis. In fact, both polysaccharides are found in the same secretory cells of the albumen gland and are subject to independent seasonal variations. Glycogen accumulates in autumn as a general energy storage for hibernation, whereas galactogen is synthesized during spring in preparation of egg-laying. It is commonly accepted that galactogen production is restricted to embryo nutrition and therefore is mainly transferred to eggs.

Little is known about the galactogen-synthesizing enzymes. A D-galactosyltransferase was described in the albumen gland of Helix pomatia. This enzyme catalyzes the transfer of D-galactose to a (1→6) linkage and is dependent upon the presence of acceptor galactogen. Similarly, a β-(1→3)-galactosyltransferase activity has been detected in albumen gland extracts from Limnaea stagnalis.

In embryos and fasting newly hatched snails, galactogen is most likely an important donor (via galactose) of metabolic intermediates. In feeding snails, the primary diet is glucose-containing starch and cellulose. These polymers are digested and contribute glucose to the pathways of intermediary metabolism. Galactogen consumption begins at the gastrula stage and continues throughout development. Up to 46-78 % of egg galactogen disappears during embryo development. The remainder is used up within the first days after hatching.

Only snail embryos and hatchlings are able to degrade galactogen, whereas other animals and even adult snails do not. β-galactosidase may be important in the release of galactose from galactogen; however, most of the catabolic pathway of this polysaccharide is still unknown.

== Other functions ==
Besides being a source of energy, few other functions have been described for galactogen in the snail eggs, and all of them are related to embryo defense and protection. Given that carbohydrates retain water, the high amount of this polysaccharide would protect the eggs from desiccation from those snails that have aerial oviposition. Besides, the high viscosity that the polysaccharide may confer to the perivitelline fluid has been suggested as a potential antimicrobial defense.

Since galactogen is a β-linked polysaccharide, such as cellulose or hemicelluloses, specific biochemical adaptations are needed to exploit it as a nutrient, such as specific glycosidases. However, apart from snail embryos and hatchlings, no animal seems to be able to catabolize galactogen, including adult snails. This fact led to consider galactogen as part of an antipredation defense system exclusive of gastropods, deterring predators by lowering the nutritional value of eggs.
