= Perivitellin-2 =

Pomacea canaliculata perivitellin-2

Identifiers
- Organism: Pomacea canaliculata (golden apple snail)
- Symbol: PcPV2
- Alt. symbols: PV2

Perivitellin-2 (PV2) is a pore-forming toxin present in the egg perivitelline fluid of the apple snails Pomacea maculata (PmPV2) and Pomacea canaliculata (PcPV2). This protein, called perivitellin, is massively accumulated in the eggs (~20 % total protein). As a toxin PV2 protects eggs from predators, but it also nourishes the developing snail embryos.

== Structure and stability ==
These ~172-kDa proteins are dimers of AB toxins, each composed of a carbohydrate-binding protein of the tachylectin family (targeting module) disulfide-linked to a pore-forming protein of the Membrane Attack Complex and Perforin (MACPF) family (toxic unit). Like most other studied perivitellins from Pomacea snails, PV2s are highly stable in a wide range of pH values and withstand gastrointestinal digestion, characteristics associated with an antinutritive defense system that deters predation by lowering the nutritional value of the eggs.

== Functions ==
As part of the perivitelline fluid, perivitellin-2 constitutes a nutrient source for the developing embryo, notably in the last stages where it is probably used as an endogenous source of energy and structural molecules during the transition to the free life. PV2s also play a role in a complex defense system that protects the embryos against predation.

Pomacea maculata perivitellin-2
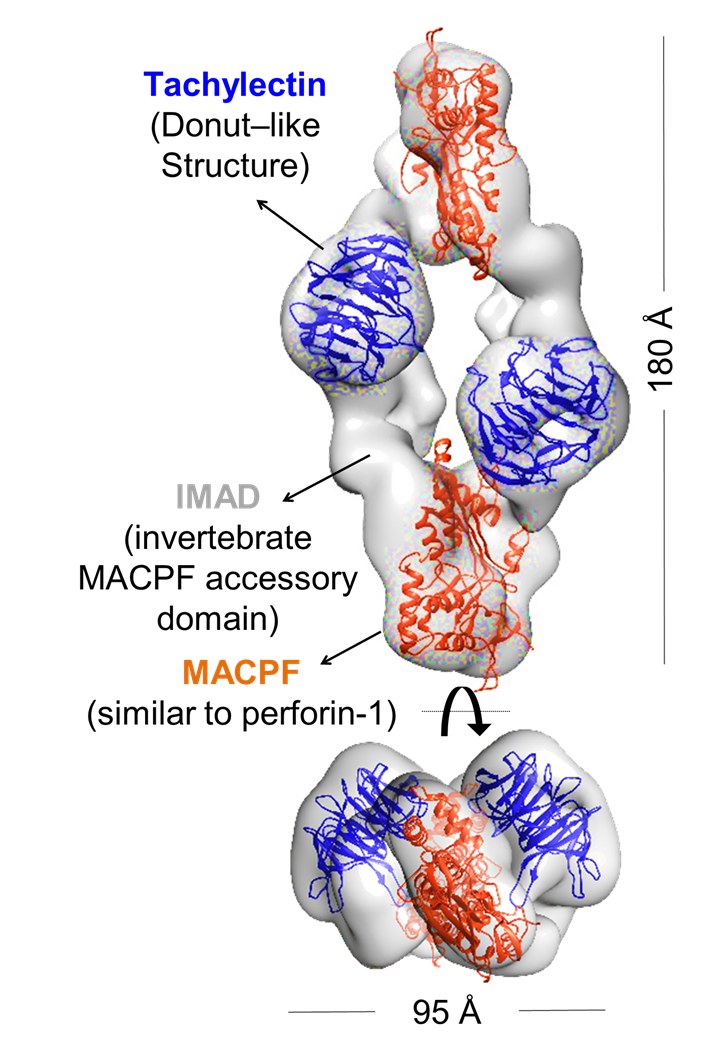

Identifiers
- Organism: Pomacea maculata (giant apple snail)
- Symbol: PmPV2
- Alt. symbols: PV2

PV2s have both lectin and perforin activities, associated to the two subunits of their particular structures. As a lectin, PV2s can agglutinate rabbit red blood cells and bind to the plasma membrane of intestinal cells both in vitro and in vivo. As a perforin, PV2s are able to disrupt intestinal cells altering the plasma membrane conductance and to form large pores in artificial lipid bilayers. An interesting issue with these perivitellins is that the combination of two immune proteins (lectin and perforin) gave rise to a new toxic entity, an excellent example of protein exaptation. This binary structure includes PV2s within "AB-toxins", a group of toxins mostly described in bacteria and plants. In PV2 toxins, the lectin would bind to target membranes through the recognition of specific glycans, acting as a delivery "B" subunit, and then the pore-forming "A" subunit would disrupt lipid bilayers forming large pores and leading to cell death, therefore constituting a true pore-forming toxin.

== Toxicity toward mammals ==
PV2 toxins proved to be highly toxic to mice when it enters the bloodstream (LD50, 96 h 0.25 mg/kg, i.p.) and those receiving sublethal doses displayed neurological signs including weakness and lethargy, low head and bent down position (orthopnoeic), half-closed eyes, tachypnoea, hirsute hair, extreme abduction of the rear limbs, paresia and were not able to support their body weight (tetraplegic), among others. Histopathological analyses of affected mice showed that PV2 toxins affect the dorsal horn of the spinal cord, particularly on the 2nd and 3rd gray matter laminas, where alters the calcium metabolism and causes neuron apoptosis. Apart from its neurotoxicity, it has been recently shown that PV2s are also enterotoxic to mice when ingested, a function that had never been ascribed to animal proteins. At the cellular level, PV2 is cytotoxic to intestinal cells, on which it causes changes in their surface morphology increasing the membrane roughness. At the system level, oral administration of PV2 induces large morphological changes on mice intestine mucosa, reducing its absorptive surface. Additionally, PV2 reaches the Peyer's patches where it activates lymphoid follicles and triggers apoptosis.

== Evolution of a pore-forming toxin ==
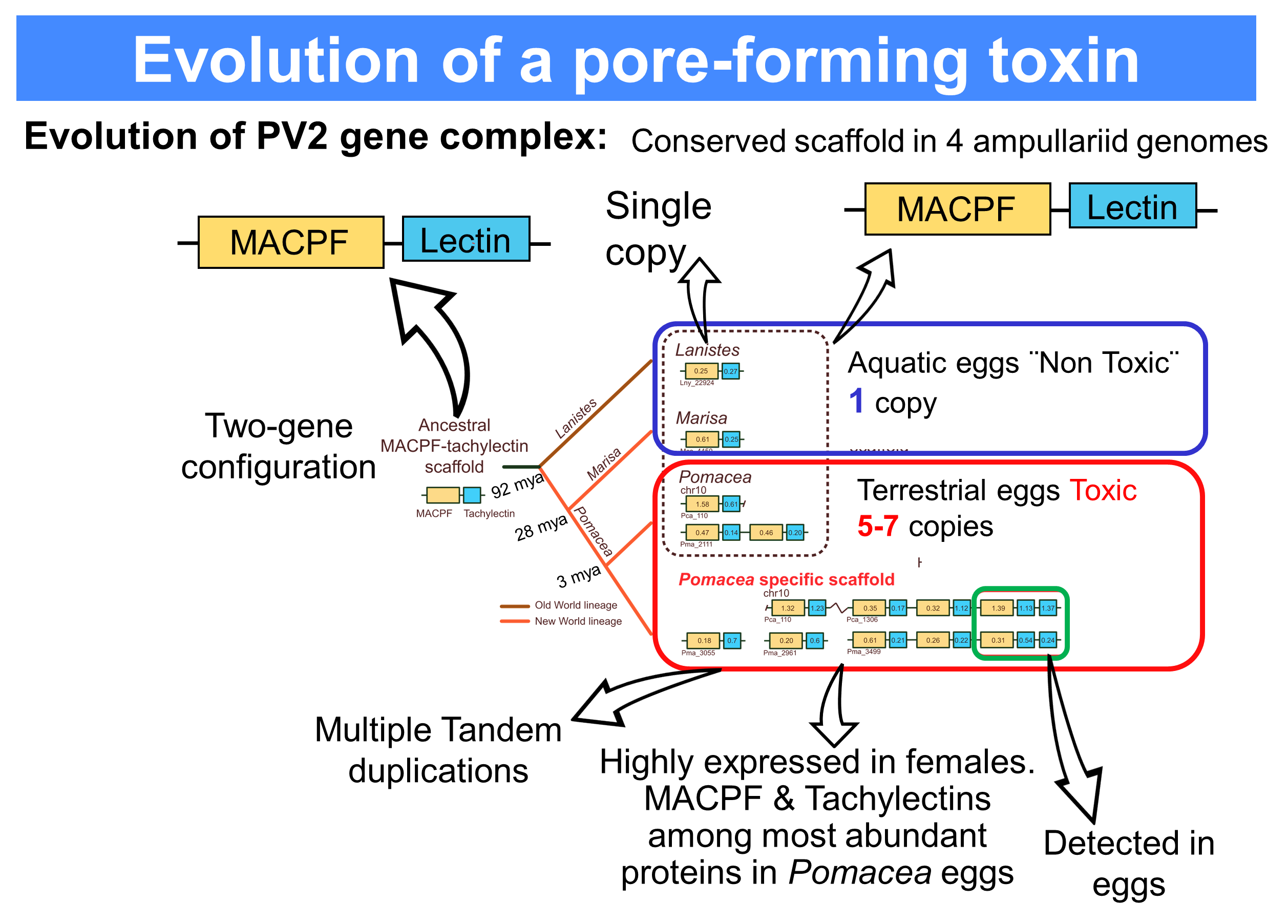
Schematic illustration of the evolution of the MACPF–tachylectin complex in ampullariids. Based on the genomic arrangements of the MACPF and tachylectin genes, the model proposes that a single copy of MACPF–tachylectin complex was present in the common ancestor of ampullariids. Only in the two species of Pomacea has it become highly diversified, with both MACPF-tachylectin genes that are conserved across Ampullariidae, and multiple Pomacea specific MACPF-tachylectin genes that were generated by tandem duplication. The final 1-MACPF and 2-tachylectin configuration is exclusively expressed in the albumen gland of Pomacea and the proteins detected in their eggs. Numbers below and inside gene diagram boxes are scaffold numbers and gene numbers in the scaffold, respectively. For instance, Lanistes nyassanus contains a MACPF gene (Lny_22924_0.25) and a tachylectin gene (Lny_22924_0.27) in scaffold Lny_22924. For Pomacea canaliculata, the chromosome numbers are shown above the gene diagram boxes. More details can be found in Sun et al., 2019.

Proteomic analysis indicates that the MACPF and the Tachylectins are among the most abundant proteins in Pomacea eggs but are minor proteins in the genera laying eggs below the water. According to the fossil record, some 3 MYA, when Pomacea diverged from Marisa and began laying eggs above the water, these two genes were subjected to extensive duplication and these unrelated proteins were combined by a covalent bond resulting in the dimerization into PV2 AB toxin that co-opted to new roles. This new structure rendered a novel toxin that is non-digestible, enterotoxic and neurotoxic.
