= AB toxin =

C2-like exotoxin "A" part
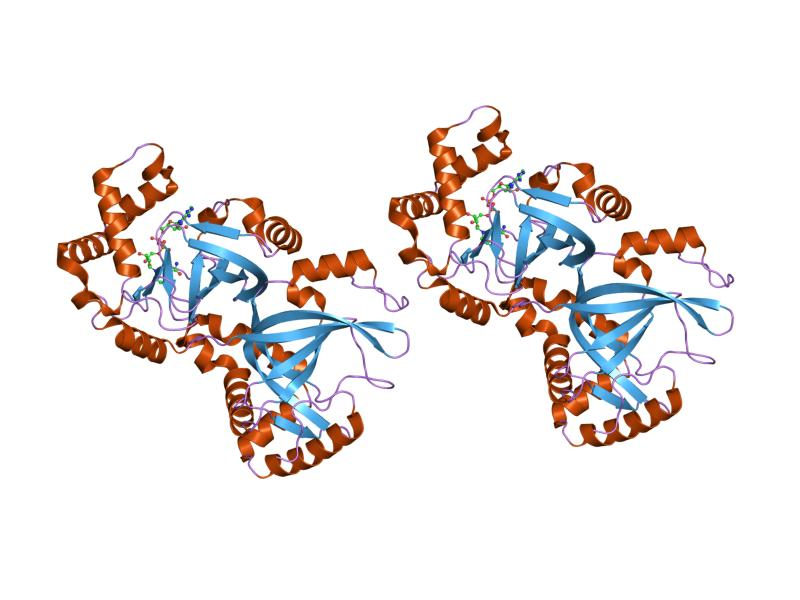
- Crystal structure of the enzymatic component of iota-toxin from Clostridium perfringens with NADH

Identifiers
- Symbol: ADPrib_exo_Tox
- Pfam: PF03496
- Pfam clan: CL0084
- InterPro: IPR003540
- SCOP2: 1giq / SCOPe / SUPFAM
Available protein structures:
- PDB: IPR003540 PF03496 (ECOD; PDBsum)
- AlphaFold: IPR003540; PF03496

AB7-type toxin, "B" part
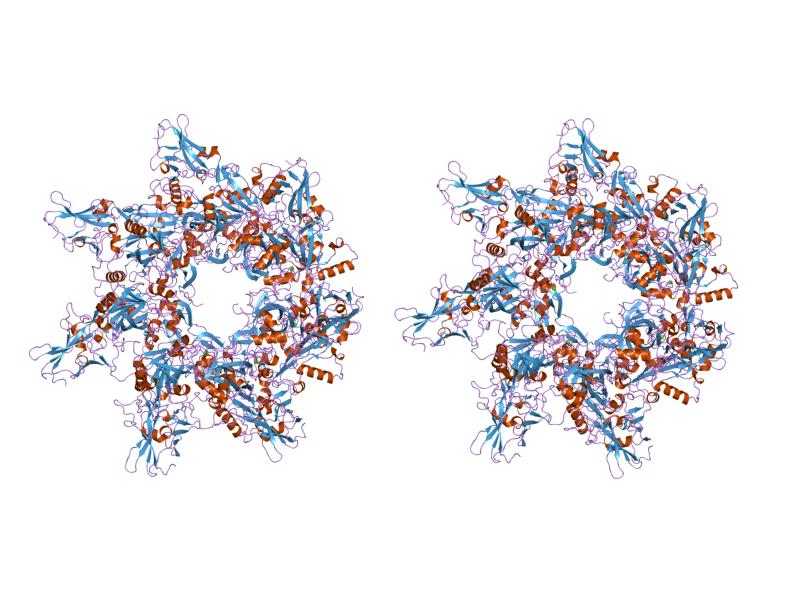
- crystal structure of the anthrax toxin protective antigen heptameric prepore

Identifiers
- Symbol: Binary_toxB
- Pfam: PF03495
- InterPro: IPR003896
- SCOP2: 1acc / SCOPe / SUPFAM
- TCDB: 1.C.42
Available protein structures:
- PDB: IPR003896 PF03495 (ECOD; PDBsum)
- AlphaFold: IPR003896; PF03495

The AB toxins are two-component protein complexes secreted by a number of pathogenic bacteria, though there is a pore-forming AB toxin found in the eggs of a snail. They can be classified as Type III toxins because they interfere with internal cell function. They are named AB toxins due to their components: the "A" component is usually the "active" portion, and the "B" component is usually the "binding" portion. The "A" subunit possesses enzyme activity, and is transferred to the host cell following a conformational change in the membrane-bound transport "B" subunit.

== Examples ==
- DT-like toxins: all toxins of these class are ADP-ribosyltransferases, which means they damage the cell by attaching an ADP-ribose moiety onto important target components: in this case eEF2.
  - The Diphtheria toxin (DT) is an AB toxin. It inhibits protein synthesis in the host cell through ADP-ribosylation of the eukaryotic elongation factor 2 (eEF2), which is an essential component for protein synthesis. It is slightly unusual in that it combines the A and B parts in the same protein chain: the pre-toxin is cleaved into two parts, then the two parts are joined by a disulfide bond.
  - The exotoxin A of Pseudomonas aeruginosa is another example of an AB toxin that targets the eEF2. The "A" part is structurally similar to the DT "A" part; the "B" part is located to the N-terminal direction to the "A" part, unlike DT. The bioinformatically-identified "Cholix" toxin from V. cholerae is similar.
- AB7 toxins: all toxins of this class share a related heptameric "B" subunit, but differ in the function of their "A" part.
  - C2-like toxins: the "A" parts are G-actin ADP-ribosyltransferases, which carry out a modification that prevents actin from polymerizing. Members include C. botulinum C. perfringens iota toxin and Clostridioides difficile ADP-ribosyltransferase.
  - Anthrax toxins: The protective antigen (PA) is the "B" component shared by the two "A" toxins in B. anthracis: the edema factor (EF) and the lethal factor (LF). LF is a Zn metalloprotease that cleaves MAPKK; EF is an adenylate cyclase that targets protein kinases.
- AB5 toxins – all these toxins share a related pentameric "B" subunit, but differ in the function of their "A" part.
- Ricin is expressed a single polypeptide that gets cleaved into two parts, one acting as "A" and the other acting as "B". Abrin is similar.
- Clostridium neurotoxins, i.e. the tetanus toxin and the botulinum toxin, are expressed a single polypeptide that gets cleaved into two parts, one acting as "A" and the other acting as "B".

== Research ==
The two-phase mechanism of action of AB toxins is of particular interest in cancer therapy research. The general idea is to modify the B component of existing toxins to selectively bind to malignant cells. This approach combines results from cancer immunotherapy with the high toxicity of AB toxins, giving raise to a new class of chimeric protein drugs, called immunotoxins.

== See also ==
- Toxalbumin
- Perivitellin-2
