= Glycogen =

Glucose polymer used as energy store in animals

Schematic two-dimensional cross-sectional view of glycogen: A core protein of glycogenin is surrounded by branches of glucose units. The entire globular granule may contain around 30,000 glucose units.

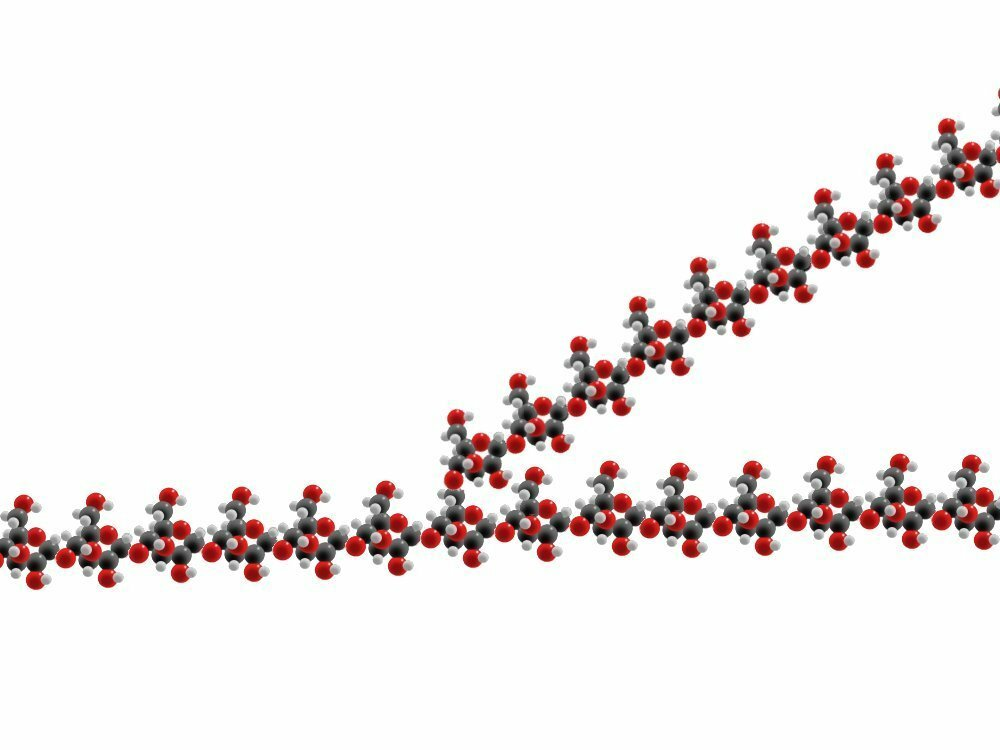
A view of the atomic structure of a single branched strand of glucose units in a glycogen molecule.

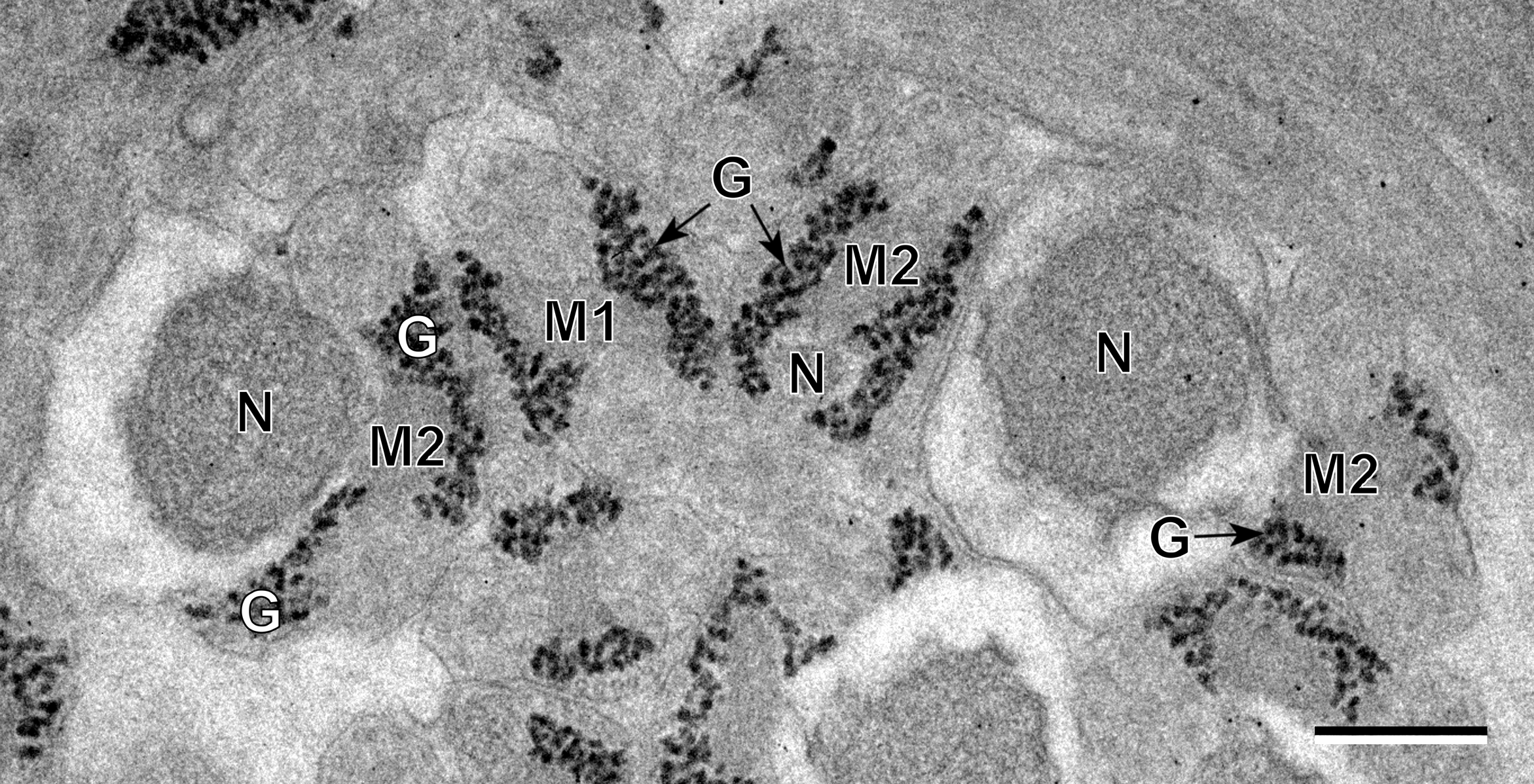
Glycogen (black granules) in spermatozoa of a flatworm; transmission electron microscopy, scale: 0.3 μm

Glycogen is a multibranched polysaccharide of glucose that serves as a form of energy storage in animals, fungi, and bacteria. It is the main storage form of glucose in the human body.

Glycogen functions as one of three regularly used forms of energy reserves, creatine phosphate being for very short-term, glycogen being for short-term and the triglyceride stores in adipose tissue (i.e., body fat) being for long-term storage. Protein, broken down into amino acids, is seldom used as a main energy source except during starvation and glycolytic crisis (see bioenergetic systems).

In humans, glycogen is made and stored primarily in the cells of the liver and skeletal muscle. In the liver, glycogen can make up 5–6% of the organ's fresh weight: the liver of an adult, weighing 1.5 kg, can store roughly 100–120 grams of glycogen. In skeletal muscle, glycogen is found in a low concentration (1–2% of the muscle mass): the skeletal muscle of an adult weighing 70 kg stores roughly 400 grams of glycogen. Small amounts of glycogen are also found in other tissues and cells, including the kidneys, red blood cells, white blood cells, and glial cells in the brain. The uterus also stores glycogen during pregnancy to nourish the embryo.

The amount of glycogen stored in the body mostly depends on oxidative type 1 fibres, physical training, basal metabolic rate, and eating habits. Different levels of resting muscle glycogen are reached by changing the number of glycogen particles, rather than increasing the size of existing particles though most glycogen particles at rest are smaller than their theoretical maximum.

Approximately 4 grams of glucose are present in the blood of humans at all times; in fasting individuals, blood glucose is maintained constant at this level at the expense of glycogen stores, primarily from the liver (glycogen in skeletal muscle is mainly used as an immediate source of energy for that muscle rather than being used to maintain physiological blood glucose levels). Glycogen stores in skeletal muscle serve as a form of energy storage for the muscle itself; however, the breakdown of muscle glycogen impedes muscle glucose uptake from the blood, thereby increasing the amount of blood glucose available for use in other tissues. Liver glycogen stores serve as a store of glucose for use throughout the body, particularly the central nervous system. The human brain consumes approximately 60% of blood glucose in fasted, sedentary individuals.

Glycogen is an analogue of starch, a glucose polymer that functions as energy storage in plants. It has a structure similar to amylopectin (a component of starch), but is more extensively branched and compact than starch. Both are white powders in their dry state. Glycogen is found in the form of granules in the cytosol/cytoplasm in many cell types, and plays an important role in the glucose cycle. Glycogen forms an energy reserve that can be quickly mobilized to meet a sudden need for glucose, but one that is less compact than the energy reserves of triglycerides (lipids). As such it is also found as storage reserve in many parasitic protozoa.

== Structure ==
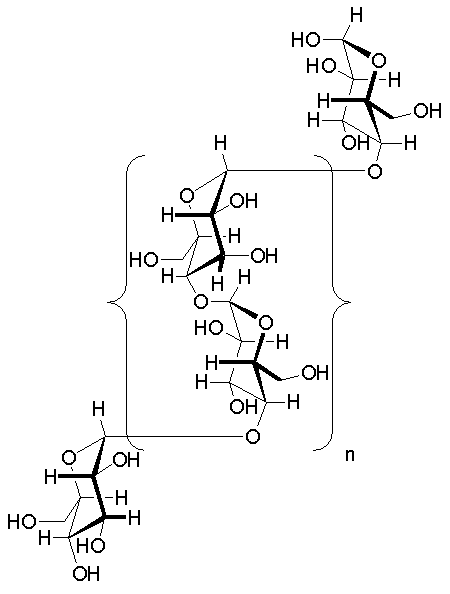
α(1→4)-glycosidic linkages in the glycogen oligomer

α(1→4)-glycosidic and α(1→6)-glycosidic linkages in the glycogen oligomer

Glycogen is a branched biopolymer consisting of linear chains of glucose residues with an average chain length of approximately 8–12 glucose units and 2,000-60,000 residues per one molecule of glycogen. Being a branched chain without any loops, the empirical formula is C_{6n}H_{10n+2}O_{5n+1}, equivalent to (C_{6}H_{10}O_{5})_{n} plus H_{2}O.

Like amylopectin, glucose units are linked together linearly by α(1→4) glycosidic bonds from one glucose to the next. Branches are linked to the chains from which they are branching off by α(1→6) glycosidic bonds between the first glucose of the new branch and a glucose on the stem chain.

Each glycogen is essentially a ball of glucose trees, with around 12 layers, centered on a glycogenin protein, with three kinds of glucose chains: A, B, and C. There is only one C-chain, attached to the glycogenin. This C-chain is formed by the self-glucosylation of the glycogenin, forming a short primer chain. From the C-chain grows out B-chains, and from B-chains branch out B- and A-chains. The B-chains have on average 2 branch points, while the A-chains are terminal, thus unbranched. On average, each chain has length 12, tightly constrained to be between 11 and 15. All A-chains reach the spherical surface of the glycogen.

Glycogen in muscle, liver, and fat cells is stored in a hydrated form, composed of three or four parts of water per part of glycogen associated with 0.45 millimoles (18 mg) of potassium per gram of glycogen.

Glucose is an osmotic molecule, and can have profound effects on osmotic pressure in high concentrations possibly leading to cell damage or death if stored in the cell without being modified. Glycogen is a non-osmotic molecule, so it can be used as a solution to storing glucose in the cell without disrupting osmotic pressure.

== Functions ==
=== Liver ===
As a meal containing carbohydrates or protein is eaten and digested, blood glucose levels rise, and the pancreas secretes insulin. Blood glucose from the portal vein enters liver cells (hepatocytes). Insulin acts on the hepatocytes to stimulate the action of several enzymes, including glycogen synthase. Glucose molecules are added to the chains of glycogen as long as both insulin and glucose remain plentiful. In this postprandial or "fed" state, the liver takes in more glucose from the blood than it releases.

After a meal has been digested and glucose levels begin to fall, insulin secretion is reduced, and glycogen synthesis stops. When it is needed for energy, glycogen is broken down and converted again to glucose. Glycogen phosphorylase is the primary enzyme of glycogen breakdown. For the next 8–12 hours, glucose derived from liver glycogen is the primary source of blood glucose used by the rest of the body for fuel.

Glucagon, another hormone produced by the pancreas, in many respects serves as a countersignal to insulin. In response to insulin levels being below normal (when blood levels of glucose begin to fall below the normal range), glucagon is secreted in increasing amounts and stimulates both glycogenolysis (the breakdown of glycogen) and gluconeogenesis (the production of glucose from other sources).

=== Muscle ===
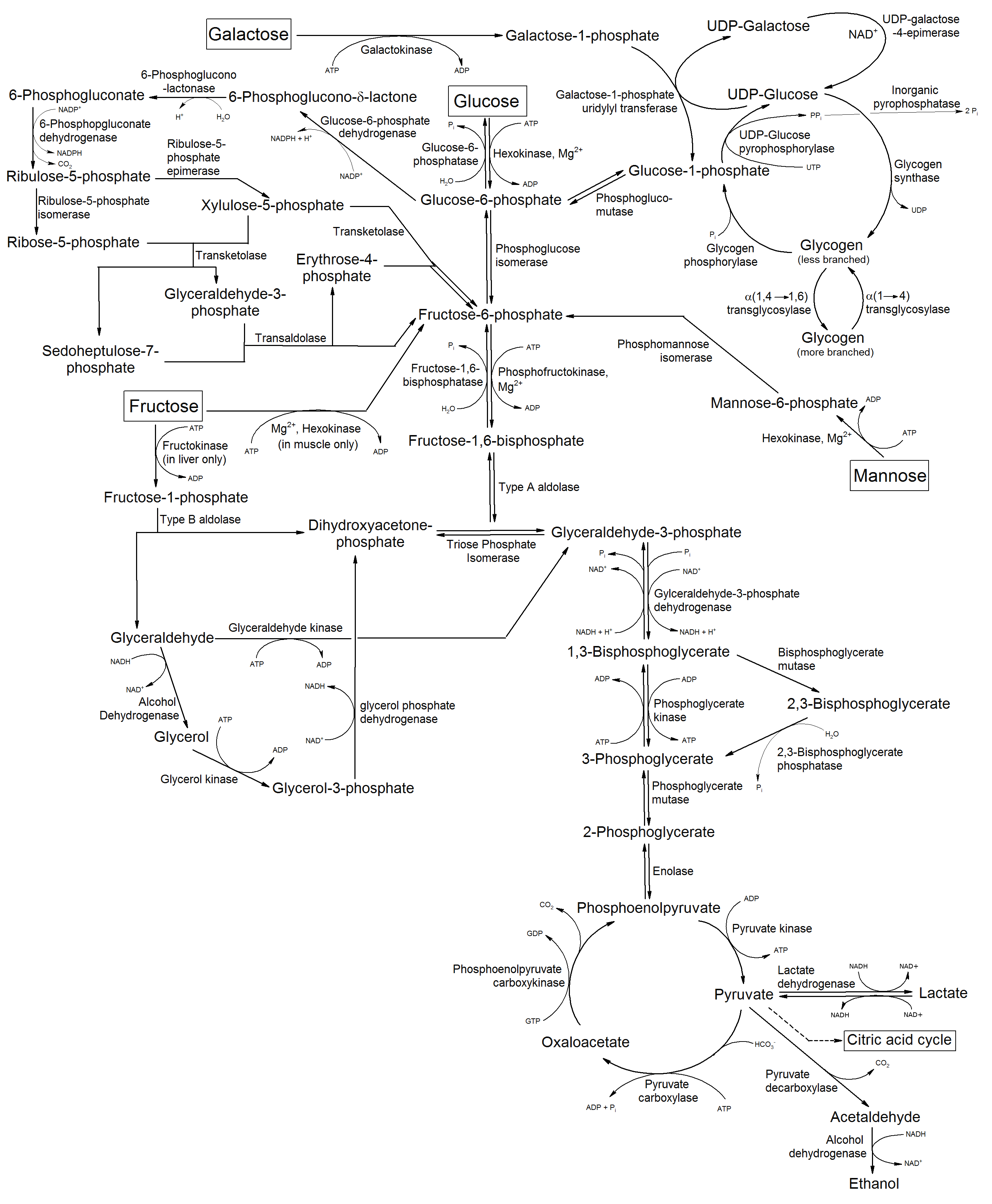
Metabolism of common monosaccharides

Muscle glycogen appears to function as a reserve of quickly available phosphorylated glucose, in the form of glucose-1-phosphate, for muscle cells. Glycogen contained within skeletal muscle cells are primarily in the form of β particles. Other cells that contain small amounts use it locally as well. As muscle cells lack glucose-6-phosphatase, which is required to pass glucose into the blood, the glycogen they store is available solely for internal use and is not shared with other cells. This is in contrast to liver cells, which, on demand, readily do break down their stored glycogen into glucose and send it through the blood stream as fuel for other organs.

Skeletal muscle needs ATP (provides energy) for muscle contraction and relaxation. Skeletal muscle relies predominantly on glycogenolysis for the first few minutes as it transitions from rest to activity, as well as throughout high-intensity aerobic activity and all anaerobic activity. During anaerobic activity, such as weightlifting and isometric exercise, the phosphagen system (ATP-PCr) and muscle glycogen are the only substrates used as they do not require oxygen nor blood flow.

Different bioenergetic systems produce ATP at different speeds, with ATP produced from muscle glycogen being much faster than fatty acid oxidation. The level of exercise intensity determines how much of which substrate (fuel) is used for ATP synthesis also. Muscle glycogen can supply a much higher rate of substrate for ATP synthesis than blood glucose. During maximum intensity exercise, muscle glycogen can supply 40 mmol glucose/kg wet weight/minute, whereas blood glucose can supply 4 – 5 mmol. Due to its high supply rate and quick ATP synthesis, during high-intensity aerobic activity (such as brisk walking, jogging, or running), the higher the exercise intensity, the more the muscle cell produces ATP from muscle glycogen. This reliance on muscle glycogen is not only to provide the muscle with enough ATP during high-intensity exercise, but also to maintain blood glucose homeostasis (that is, to not become hypoglycaemic by the muscles needing to extract far more glucose from the blood than the liver can provide). A deficit of muscle glycogen leads to muscle fatigue known as "hitting the wall" or "the bonk" (see below under glycogen depletion).

== Structure type ==
In 1999, Meléndez et al. claimed that the structure of glycogen is optimal under a particular metabolic constraint model, where the structure was suggested to be "fractal" in nature. However, research by Besford et al. used small angle X-ray scattering experiments accompanied by branching theory models to show that glycogen is a randomly hyperbranched polymer nanoparticle. Glycogen is not fractal in nature. This has been subsequently verified by others who have performed Monte Carlo simulations of glycogen particle growth, and shown that the molecular density reaches a maximum near the centre of the nanoparticle structure, not at the periphery (contradicting a fractal structure that would have greater density at the periphery).

== History ==
Glycogen was discovered by Claude Bernard. His experiments showed that the liver contained a substance that could give rise to reducing sugar by the action of a "ferment" in the liver. By 1857, he described the isolation of a substance he called "la matière glycogène", or "sugar-forming substance". Soon after the discovery of glycogen in the liver, M.A. Sanson found that muscular tissue also contains glycogen. The empirical formula for glycogen of (C_{6}H_{10}O_{5})_{n} was established by August Kekulé in 1858.

Sanson, M. A. "Note sur la formation physiologique du sucre dans l’economie animale." Comptes rendus des séances de l'Académie des Sciences 44 (1857): 1323–5.

== Metabolism ==
=== Synthesis ===
Glycogen synthesis is, unlike its breakdown, endergonic—it requires the input of energy. Energy for glycogen synthesis comes from uridine triphosphate (UTP), which reacts with glucose-1-phosphate, forming UDP-glucose, in a reaction catalysed by UTP—glucose-1-phosphate uridylyltransferase. Glycogen is synthesized from monomers of UDP-glucose initially by the protein glycogenin, which has two tyrosine anchors for the reducing end of glycogen, since glycogenin is a homodimer. After about eight glucose molecules have been added to a tyrosine residue, the enzyme glycogen synthase progressively lengthens the glycogen chain using UDP-glucose, adding α(1→4)-bonded glucose to the nonreducing end of the glycogen chain.

The glycogen branching enzyme catalyzes the transfer of a terminal fragment of six or seven glucose residues from a nonreducing end to the C-6 hydroxyl group of a glucose residue deeper into the interior of the glycogen molecule. The branching enzyme can act upon only a branch having at least 11 residues, and the enzyme may transfer to the same glucose chain or adjacent glucose chains.

=== Breakdown ===
Glycogen is cleaved from the nonreducing ends of the chain by the enzyme glycogen phosphorylase to produce monomers of glucose-1-phosphate:

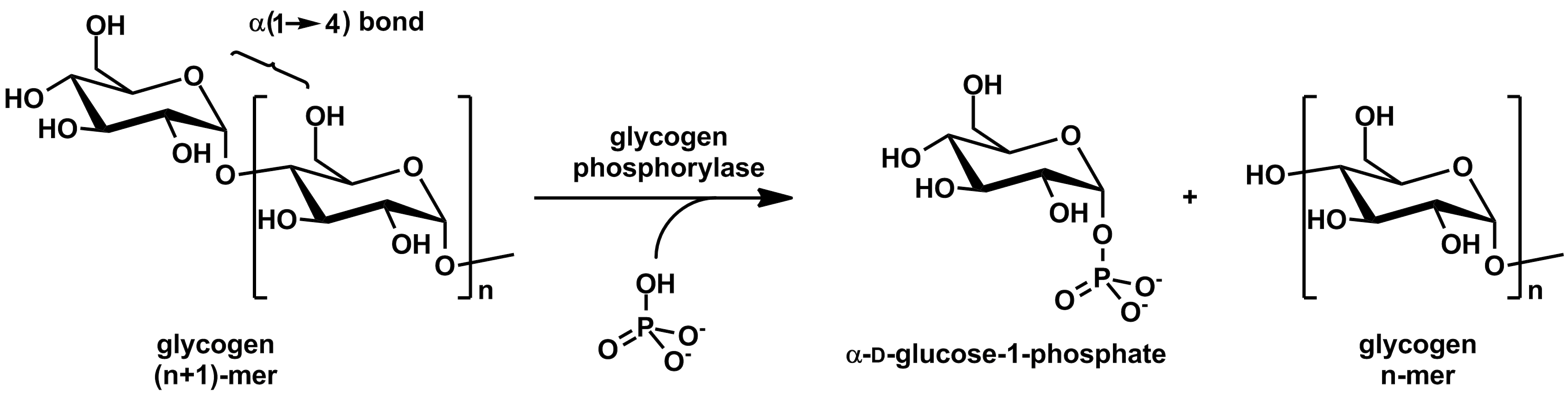
Action of glycogen phosphorylase on glycogen

In vivo, phosphorolysis proceeds in the direction of glycogen breakdown because the ratio of phosphate and glucose-1-phosphate is usually greater than 100. Glucose-1-phosphate is then converted to glucose 6 phosphate (G6P) by phosphoglucomutase. A special debranching enzyme is needed to remove the α(1→6) branches in branched glycogen and reshape the chain into a linear polymer. The G6P monomers produced have three possible fates:

- G6P can continue on the glycolysis pathway and be used as fuel.
- G6P can enter the pentose phosphate pathway via the enzyme glucose-6-phosphate dehydrogenase to produce NADPH and 5 carbon sugars.
- In the liver and kidney, G6P can be dephosphorylated back to glucose by the enzyme glucose 6-phosphatase. This is the final step in the gluconeogenesis pathway.

== Clinical relevance ==
=== Disorders of glycogen metabolism ===
The most common disease in which glycogen metabolism becomes abnormal is diabetes, in which, because of abnormal amounts of insulin, liver glycogen can be abnormally accumulated or depleted. Restoration of normal glucose metabolism usually normalizes glycogen metabolism, as well.

In hypoglycemia caused by excessive insulin, liver glycogen levels are high, but the high insulin levels prevent the glycogenolysis necessary to maintain normal blood sugar levels. Glucagon is a common treatment for this type of hypoglycemia.

Various inborn errors of carbohydrate metabolism are caused by deficiencies of enzymes or transport proteins necessary for glycogen synthesis or breakdown. These are collectively referred to as glycogen storage diseases.

=== Glycogen depletion and endurance exercise ===
Long-distance athletes, such as marathon runners, cross-country skiers, and cyclists, often experience glycogen depletion, where almost all of the athlete's glycogen stores are depleted after long periods of exertion without sufficient carbohydrate consumption. This phenomenon is referred to as "hitting the wall" in running and "bonking" in cycling.

Glycogen depletion can be forestalled in three possible ways:

- First, during exercise, carbohydrates with the highest possible rate of conversion to blood glucose (high glycemic index) are ingested continuously. The best possible outcome of this strategy replaces about 35% of glucose consumed at heart rates above about 80% of maximum.
- Second, through endurance training adaptations and specialized regimens (e.g. fasting, low-intensity endurance training), the body can condition type I muscle fibers to improve both fuel use efficiency and workload capacity to increase the percentage of fatty acids used as fuel, sparing carbohydrate use from all sources.
- Third, by consuming large quantities of carbohydrates after depleting glycogen stores as a result of exercise or diet, the body can increase storage capacity of intramuscular glycogen stores. This process is known as carbohydrate loading. In general, glycemic index of carbohydrate source does not matter since muscular insulin sensitivity is increased as a result of temporary glycogen depletion.

When athletes ingest both carbohydrate and caffeine following exhaustive exercise, their glycogen stores tend to be replenished more rapidly; however, the minimum dose of caffeine at which there is a clinically significant effect on glycogen repletion has not been established.

=== Nanomedicine ===
Glycogen nanoparticles have been investigated as potential drug delivery systems.

== See also ==
- Bioenergetic systems
- Chitin
- Peptidoglycan
