= Ovorubin =

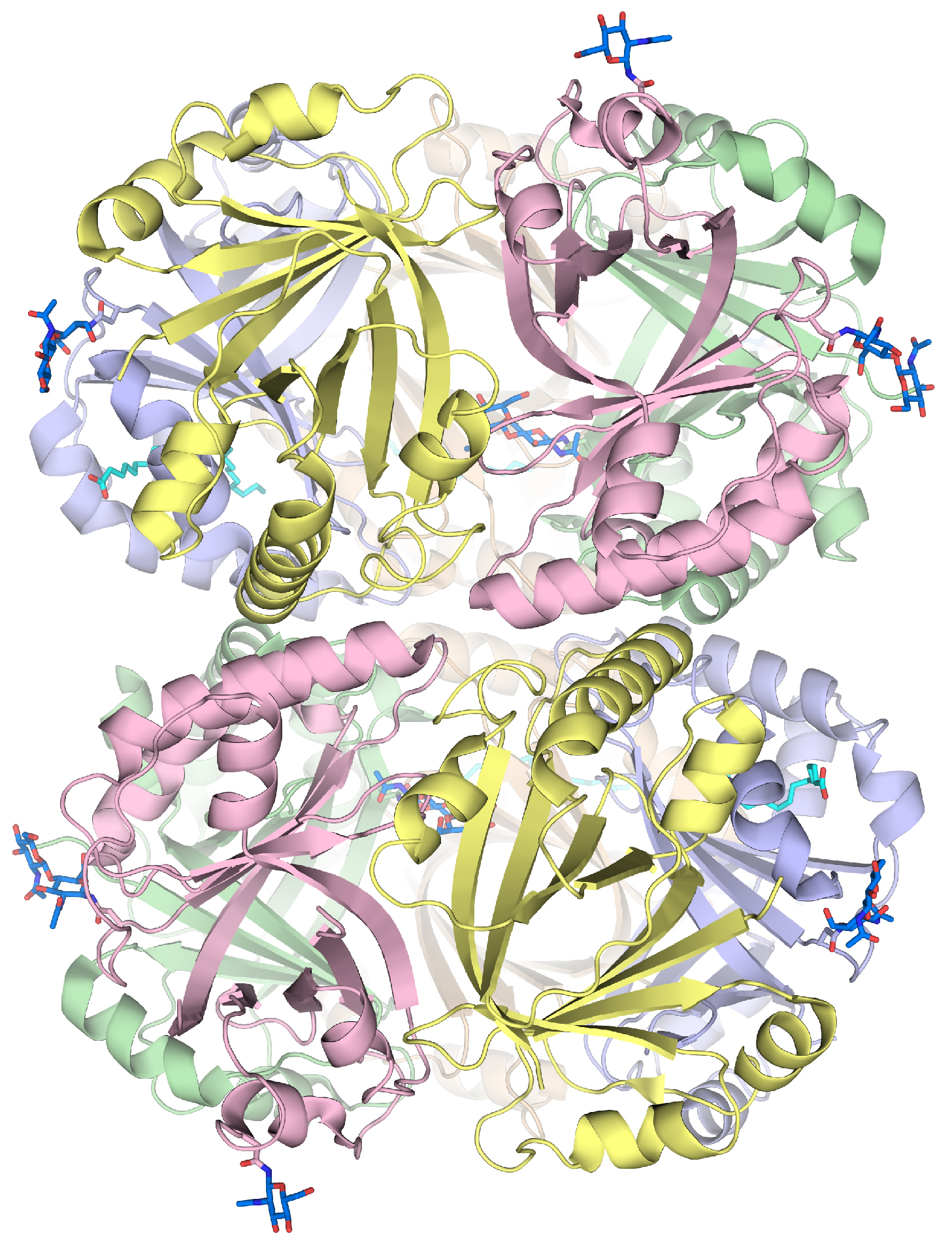

Identifiers
- Organism: Pomacea canaliculata (golden apple snail)
- Symbol: PcOvo
- Alt. symbols: PcPV1
- PDB: 9UAJ
- UniProt: J7I2T6
Search for
- Structures: Swiss-model
- Domains: InterPro

Ovorubin (PcOvo or PcPV1) is the most abundant perivitellin (>60 % total protein) of the perivitelline fluid from Pomacea canaliculata snail eggs. This glyco-lipo-caroteno protein complex is a approximately 300 kDa multimer of different ~30 kDa subunits. The three-dimensional structure of ovorubin was determined by cryo-electron microscopy. The protein is decameric (10-mer) consisting of two copies of PcOvo1-5.

Together with the other perivitellins from Pomacea canaliculata eggs, ovorubin serves a nutrient source for developing embryos, notably to the intermediate and late stages. Moreover, after hatching, the protein is still detected in the lumen of the digestive gland ready to be endocytosed, therefore, acting as a nutrient source for the newly hatched snail.

Ovorubin contains carbohydrates and carotenoid pigments as main prosthetic groups, which are related to many physiological roles on Pomacea aerial egg-laying strategy. Given that carbohydrates tend to retain water, the high glycosylation of ovorubin (~17 % w/w) was proposed as an embryo defense against water loss. The carotenoid pigments stabilized by ovorubin also provide the eggs of antioxidant and photoprotective capacities, crucial roles to cope with the harsh conditions of the aerial environment. The presence of carotenoid pigments is also responsible for the brightly reddish coloration of Ovorubin, and therefore snail eggs, which was related to a warning coloration (aposematism) advertising predators about the presence of deterrents. In fact, field evidence of egg unpalatability is provided by the fact that most animals foraging in habitats where the apple snails live ignore these eggs.

Like most other studied perivitellins from Pomacea snails, ovorubin is highly stable in a wide range of pH values and withstands gastrointestinal digestion, characteristics associated with an antinutritive defense system that deters predation by lowering the nutritional value of the eggs.
