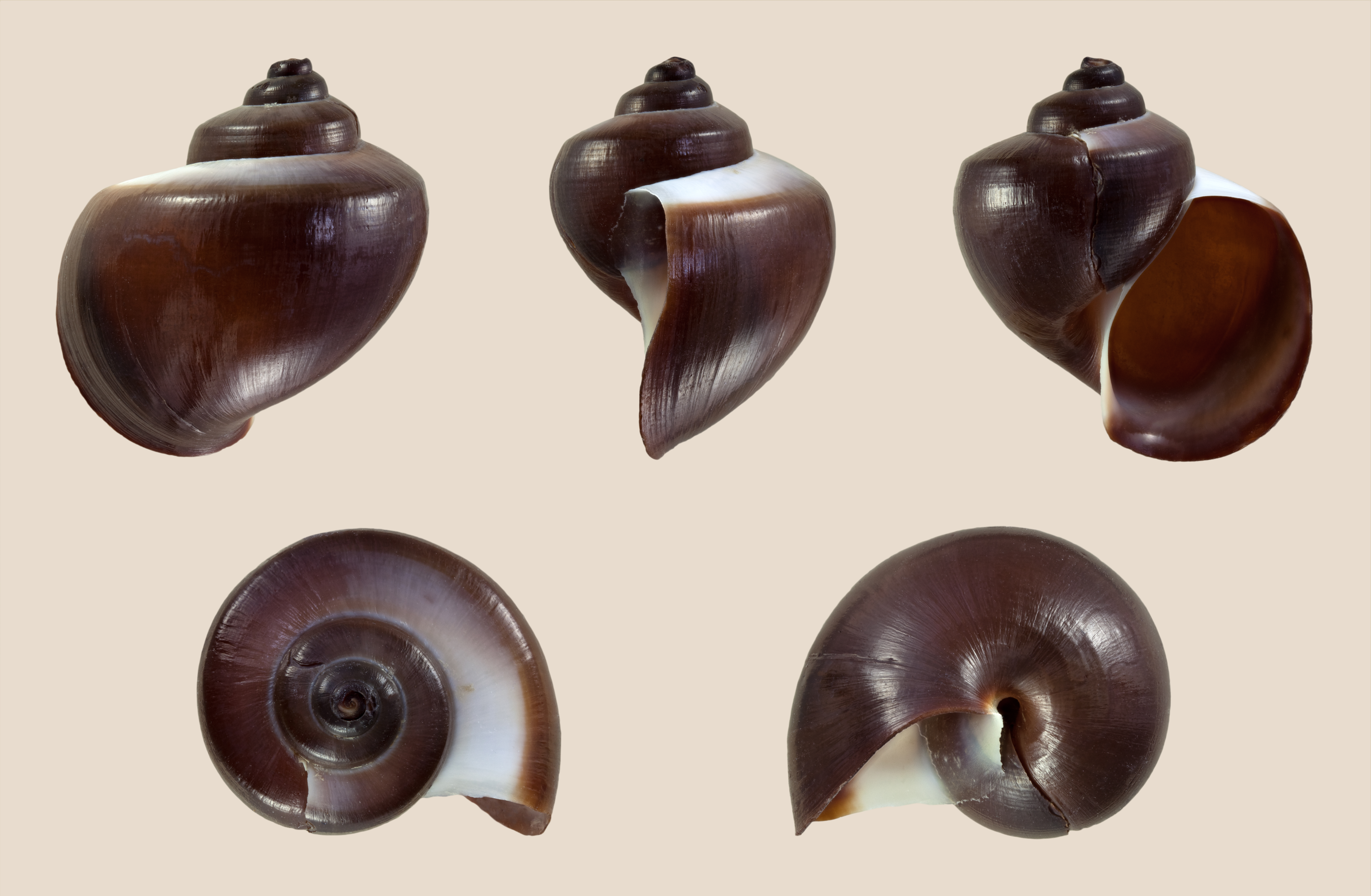
- Five views of a shell of P. scalaris form Argentina

Scientific classification
- Kingdom: Animalia
- Phylum: Mollusca
- Class: Gastropoda
- Subclass: Caenogastropoda
- Order: Architaenioglossa
- Family: Ampullariidae
- Subfamily: Pomaceinae
- Genus: Pomacea
- Species: P. scalaris

Binomial name
- Pomacea scalaris (d'Orbigny, 1835)

Synonyms
- Ampullaria scalaris d'Orbigny, 1835 (original combination); Ampullaria angulata Jay, 1836; Ampullaria angulata Deshayes, 1850 (invalid: junior homonym of Ampullaria angulata Jay, 1836); Pomacea (Pomacea) scalaris (d'Orbigny, 1835)· accepted, alternate representation

= Pomacea scalaris =

Species of gastropod

Pomacea scalaris is a species of freshwater snail of the Ampullariidae ("apple snails") family. It was described by Alcide d'Orbigny in 1835. It is found in Bolivia, Paraguay, Argentina, Brasil, and Uruguay. It is invasive in Taiwan. First documented in 1989, it was possibly introduced alongside Pomacea canaliculata illegally brought to the country for aquaculture.

Pomacea scalaris can grow to a shell length of at least 31 mm (1.2 in).
