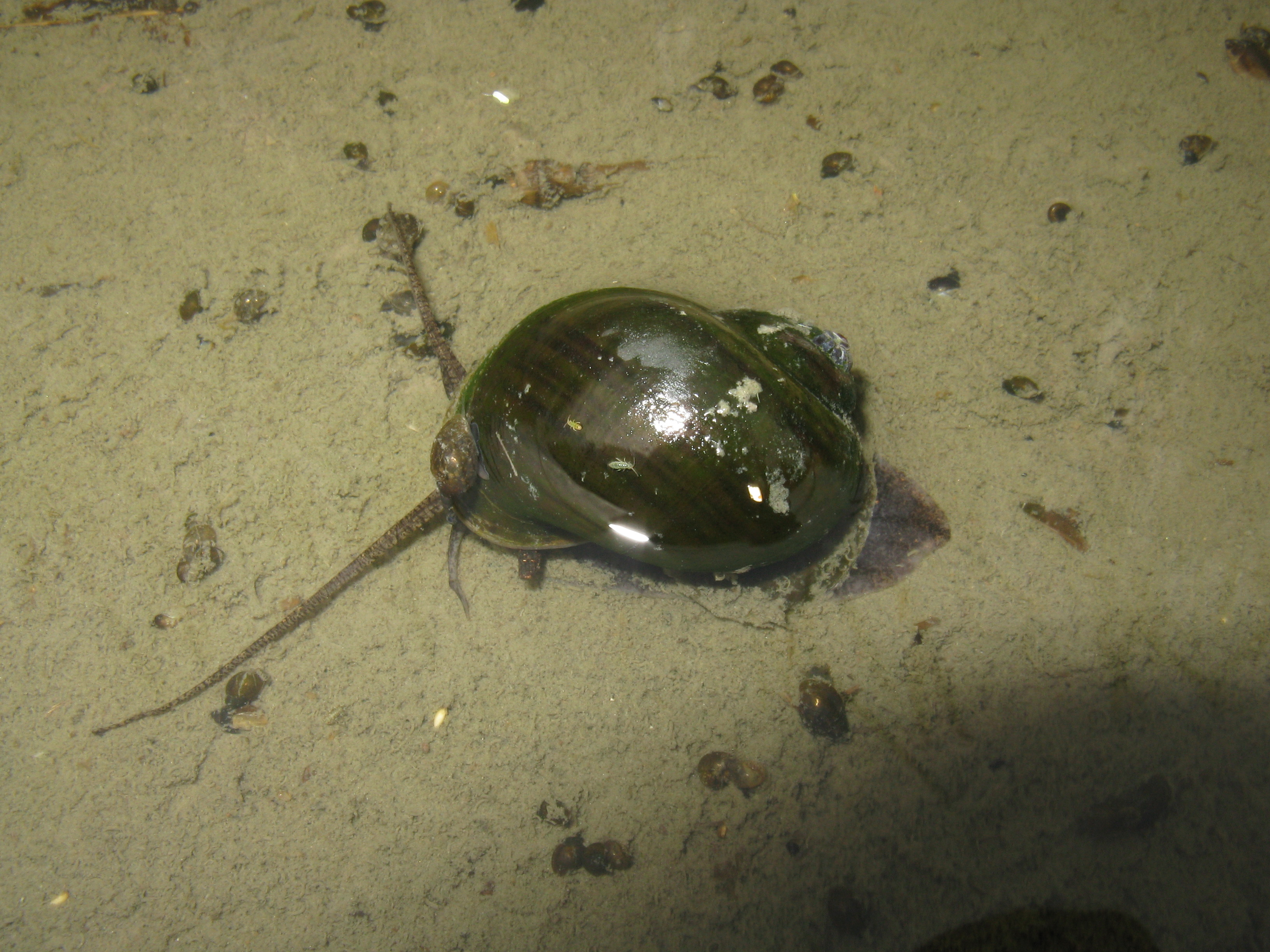

Conservation status
- Least Concern (IUCN 3.1)

- Secure (NatureServe)

Scientific classification
- Kingdom: Animalia
- Phylum: Mollusca
- Class: Gastropoda
- Subclass: Caenogastropoda
- Order: Architaenioglossa
- Family: Ampullariidae
- Genus: Pomacea
- Species: P. canaliculata

Binomial name
- Pomacea canaliculata (Lamarck, 1819)

= Pomacea canaliculata =

Species of gastropod

Pomacea canaliculata, commonly known as the golden apple snail or the channeled apple snail, is a species of large freshwater snail with gills and an operculum, an aquatic gastropod mollusc in the family Ampullariidae, the apple snails. South American in origin, this species is considered to be in the top 100 of the "World's Worst Invasive Alien Species". It is also ranked as the 40th worst alien species in Europe and the worst alien species of gastropod in Europe.

== Distribution ==
The native distribution of P. canaliculata is basically tropical and subtropical, including Argentina, Bolivia, Paraguay, Uruguay, and Brazil. The southernmost record for the species is Paso de las Piedras reservoir, south of the Buenos Aires province, Argentina.

=== Non-indigenous distribution ===
This species also occurs in the United States, where the initial introductions were probably from aquarium release, aka "aquarium dumping". The non-indigenous distribution includes: Lake Wawasee in Kosciusko County, Indiana; Langan Park and Three Mile Creek in Mobile, Alabama; a pond bordering the Mobile-Tensaw River Delta in Baldwin County, Alabama; Little Wekiva River, Orlando, Florida; a lake near Jacksonville, Florida; Miramar Reservoir in San Diego County, California; and a pond near Yuma, Arizona. Established populations exist in California and Hawaii.

Moving north, the Government of Alberta has labelled channeled apple snails as an invasive species.

The species has been found in China since 1981. Its initial point of distribution in China was Zhongshan city.

The species has been found in Chile since 2009 with a restricted distribution.

The species has also been found in the Philippines, Japan, Korea, Taiwan, Vietnam, Cambodia, Laos, Papua New Guinea, parts of Indonesia and Malaysia, Singapore, and Guam. In 1980, the apple snail was introduced to south-east Asia as a food item and aquarium pet. First, it was introduced to Taiwan, then Japan, then Thailand and the Philippines. Instead of catching on, snails were released or escaped and have become a major agricultural pest. Samples taken 3 December 2020 in Mwea Constituency, Kirinyaga County, Kenya were the first in that country, and indeed the first in continental Africa.

== Shell description ==
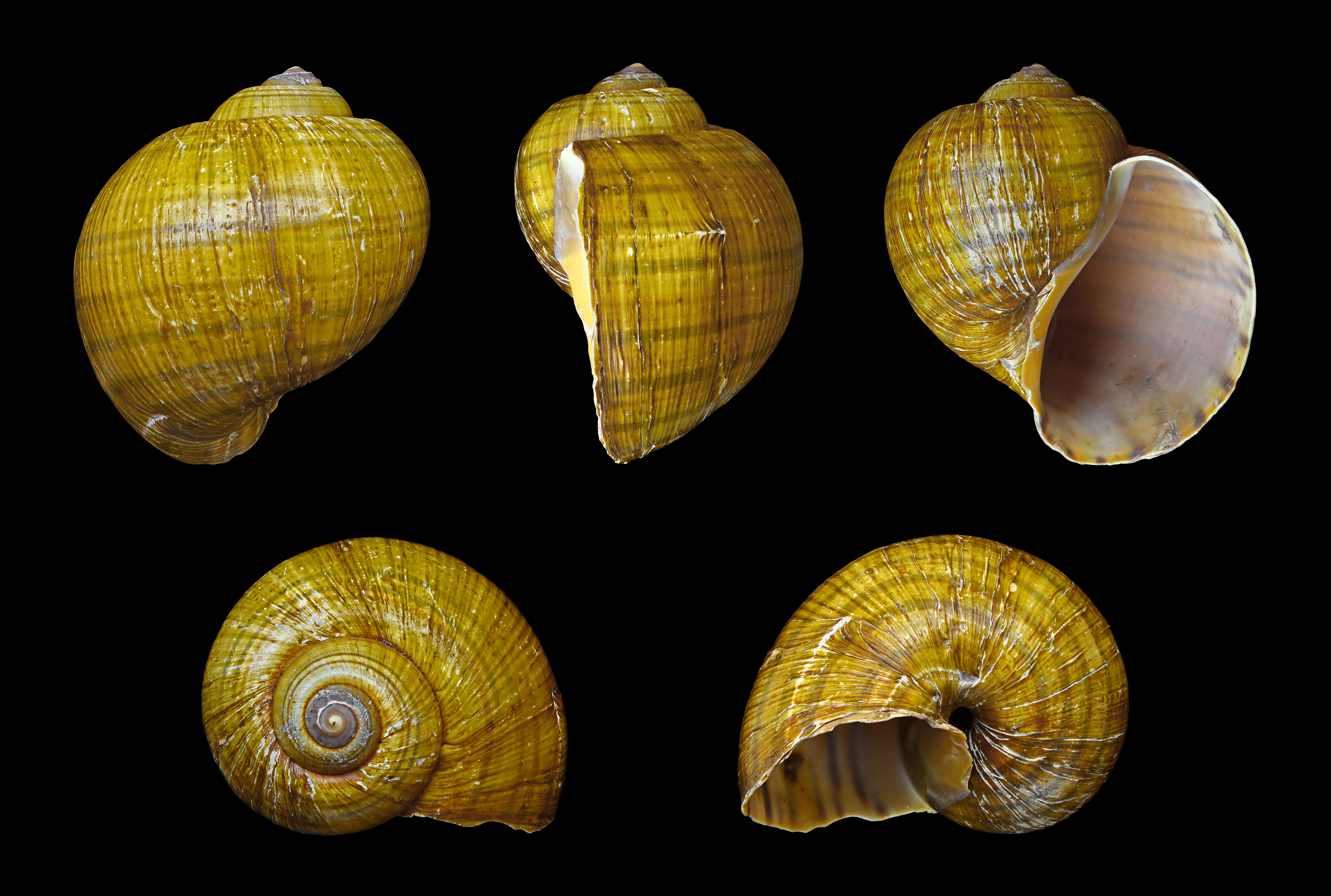
Five views of shell of P. canaliculata, Shell diameter 8 cm (3 1/4 in)

The shells of these apple snails are globular in shape. Normal coloration typically includes bands of brown, black, and yellowish-tan; color patterns are extremely variable. Albino and gold color variations exist. The size of the shell is up to 150 millimetres (6 in) in length.

== Ecology ==
=== Habitat ===
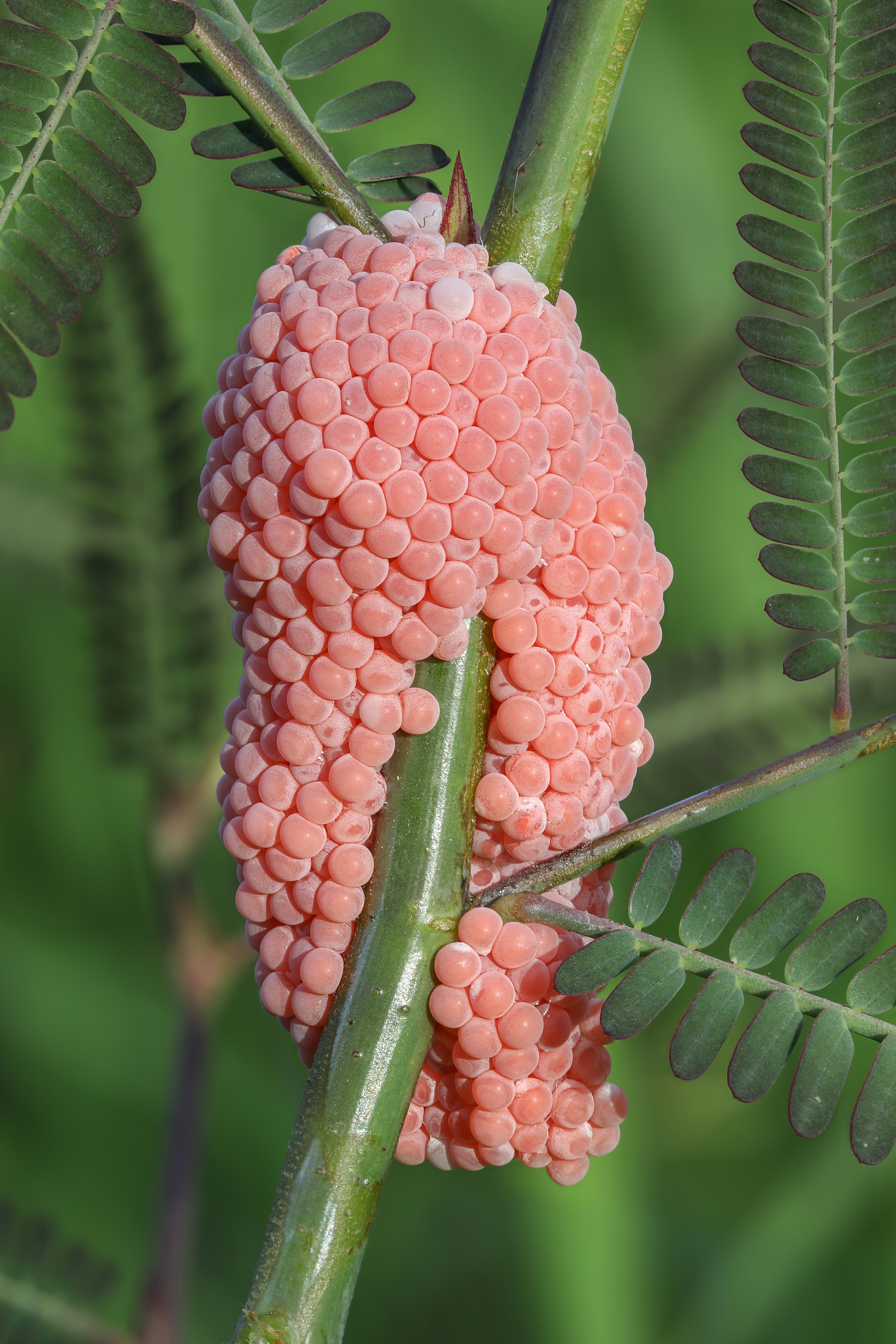
P. canaliculata egg masses are typically bright pink or orange in color and are laid on emergent vegetation over freshwater bodies of water.

This species lives in freshwater lake, river, pond and swamp habitats and tolerates a wide range of temperatures. In natural settings, they rely on grasses and other emergent vegetation growing along the perimeter of bodies of water to lay their eggs. Where invasive, they can utilize crops such as rice and taro as a substrate for reproduction.

=== Feeding habits ===
P. canaliculata is extremely polyphagous, feeding on vegetal (primarily macrophytophagous, feeding on floating or submersed higher plants), detrital, and animal matter. Diet may vary with age, with younger smaller individuals feeding on algae and detritus, and older, bigger (15 millimetres (19/32 in) and above) individuals later shifting to higher plants. This species negatively impacts rice and taro agriculture worldwide where it has been introduced.

=== Life cycle ===
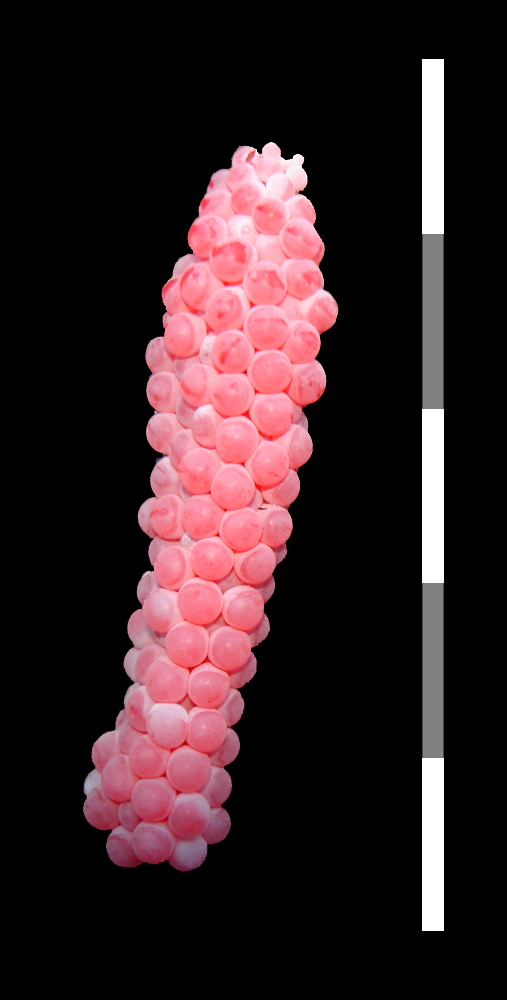
Eggs of Pomacea canaliculata, scale bar in cm (25/64 in).

In temperate climates, the egg-laying period of this species extends from early spring to early fall, while in tropical areas reproduction is continuous. The duration of the reproductive period of P. canaliculata decreases with latitude, to a minimum of six months in the southern limit of its natural distribution. Adult females oviposit on emergent vegetation at night, but will also lay their eggs on rocks and manmade surfaces like boats. Once laid, the eggs take approximately two weeks to hatch, during which time the bright pink or orange coloration of the eggs fades.

First direct evidence (of all animals), that proteinase inhibitor from eggs of P. canaliculata interacts as trypsin inhibitor with protease of potential predators, has been reported in 2010.

=== Predators ===
The snail kite, Rostrhamus sociabilis, is a predator of this species in South America. The fire ant, Solenopsis geminata, has also been observed to prey upon this species.

=== Parasites ===
Approximately 1% of the P. canaliculata on sale on local markets in Dali City, Yunnan, China were found to be infected with pathogenic Angiostrongylus cantonensis in 2009.

=== Control ===
Crude cyclotide extracts from both Oldenlandia affinis and Viola odorata plants showed molluscicidal activity comparable to the synthetic molluscicide metaldehyde. Because submerging developing eggs below the water reduces hatching success, manipulating the water level in agricultural fields and dammed reservoirs may provide a tool for controlling invasive populations.

== Human use ==
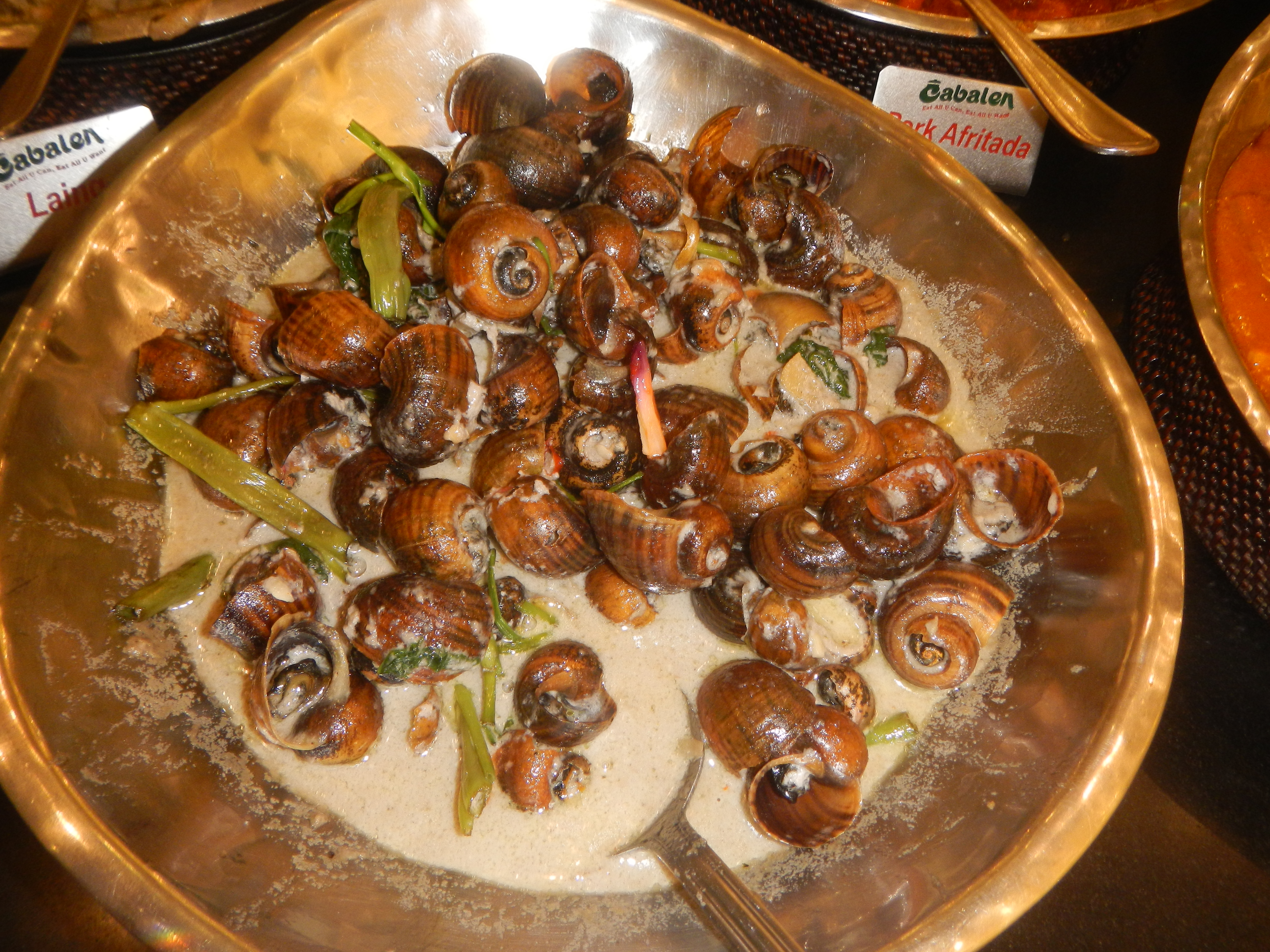
Filipino ginataang kuhol (apple snails in coconut milk)

This species is edible. P. canaliculata constitutes one of the three predominant freshwater snails found in Chinese markets. In China and Southeast Asia, consumption of raw or undercooked snails of P. canaliculata and other snails is the primary route of infection with Angiostrongylus cantonensis causing angiostrongyliasis.

In Isan, Thailand these snails are collected and consumed. They are picked by hand or with a hand-net from canals, swamps, ponds, and flooded paddy fields during the rainy season. During the dry season when these snails are concealed under dried mud, collectors use a spade to scrape the mud in order to find them. The snails are usually collected by women and children. After collection, the snails are cleaned and parboiled. They are then taken out of their shells, cut, and cleaned in salted water. After rinsing with water, they are mixed with roasted rice, dried chili pepper, lime juice, and fish sauce, and then eaten.

Some French restaurants have tried to use P. canaliculata as an alternative to escargot. After boiling, the guts and eggs are removed, and the muscular body is washed with vinegar to eliminate the odor. As a result, it can be used as an alternative to escargot. The nutrition value, taste, and ease of growing of P. canaliculata led to it being identified as one of the ideal choices for space aquaculture, coming second only to brine shrimp. P. canaliculata has displaced some of the indigenous rice field apple snail species in the genus Pila traditionally eaten in Southeast Asia (including Thailand and the Philippines) such as Pila ampullacea and Pila pesmei; as well as the viviparid trapdoor snail (Cipangopaludina chinensis).

In some paddy fields in Japan, P. canaliculata is used to control weeds by allowing the snail to eat them. However, this method runs risk of the snails also eating young rice plants, and of spreading to nearby fields and waterways as an invasive pest.

It is a part of the ornamental pet trade for freshwater aquaria.

== See also ==
- Keong Emas
- Ovorubin
- Perivitellin-2
