= Perivitelline fluid =

The perivitelline fluid is an extracellular fluid found in the eggs of most gastropods and constitutes the main source of nutrition and defense for their embryos. It replaces the egg yolk of other animals, which in snail eggs is reduced to non-nutritive proteinaceous granules with putative enzymatic function.

During embryonic development the perivitelline fluid is ingested macropinocytotically by the embryos and the resulting phagosomes fuse with β-granules containing hydrolytic enzymes, which digest the perivitelline fluid components.

== Origin ==
The perivitelline fluid is synthesized by the albumen gland of female snails (also known as albumen gland-capsule gland complex or uterine gland), an accessory gland from the reproductive tract. Fertilized oocytes enter the albumen gland and, on their way out, are coated with the perivitelline fluid. The amount of perivitelline fluid per egg vary considerably among species. However, the amount of perivitelline fluid per egg is constant within a given species. In this regard, it has been shown in Pomacea apple snails that during the reproductive season, when the nutrient precursors decrease in the albumen gland due to successive ovipositions, females tend to reduce the number of eggs per clutch but not the amount allocated to each egg.

== Composition ==
The perivitelline fluid contains predominantly galactogen, proteins, and calcium.

Carbohydrate is invariably the most abundant component of the perivitelline fluid. Specifically, the eggs of most gastropod accumulate the polysaccharide galactogen, which would provide the main energy source for the developing embryo. A small amount of soluble glucose was also detected in some species.

Proteins, called perivitellins, are the second most abundant component of the perivitelline fluid. Perivitellins are also a source of nutrients for snail embryos and play a role in protection against pathogens and predators, and include non-digestible perivitellins, toxins and protease inhibitors. These proteins were thoroughly studied in apple snails from the genus Pomacea, where they were originally grouped in two most abundant protein fractions perivitellin-1 or PV1, perivitellin-2 or PV2 (comprising approximately 70% of total protein), and a heterogeneous fraction dubbed perivitellin-3 or PV3 fraction. Recent proteomic analyses, however, showed that the perivitelline fluid from Pomacea snails has between 34-38 different proteins with a wide variety of functions.

Lipids are a minor component, mostly represented by membrane lipids, indicating that snails do not use lipids as a major energy reserve during reproduction. Apart from structural lipids, some eggs also contain carotenoid pigments, notably astaxanthin. These lipidic pigments have been associated with antioxidant and photoprotective functions, and also provide Pomacea eggs with the typical bright color that would function as a warning signal (i.e. aposematism) to deter predators.

Among the inorganic components, calcium ion is the most abundant in the perivitelline fluid. As these snails have direct development, calcium needs to be stored to allow the snail to develop the shell during organogenesis. Besides, calcium is the main component of the eggshell of those snails with aerial oviposition.
