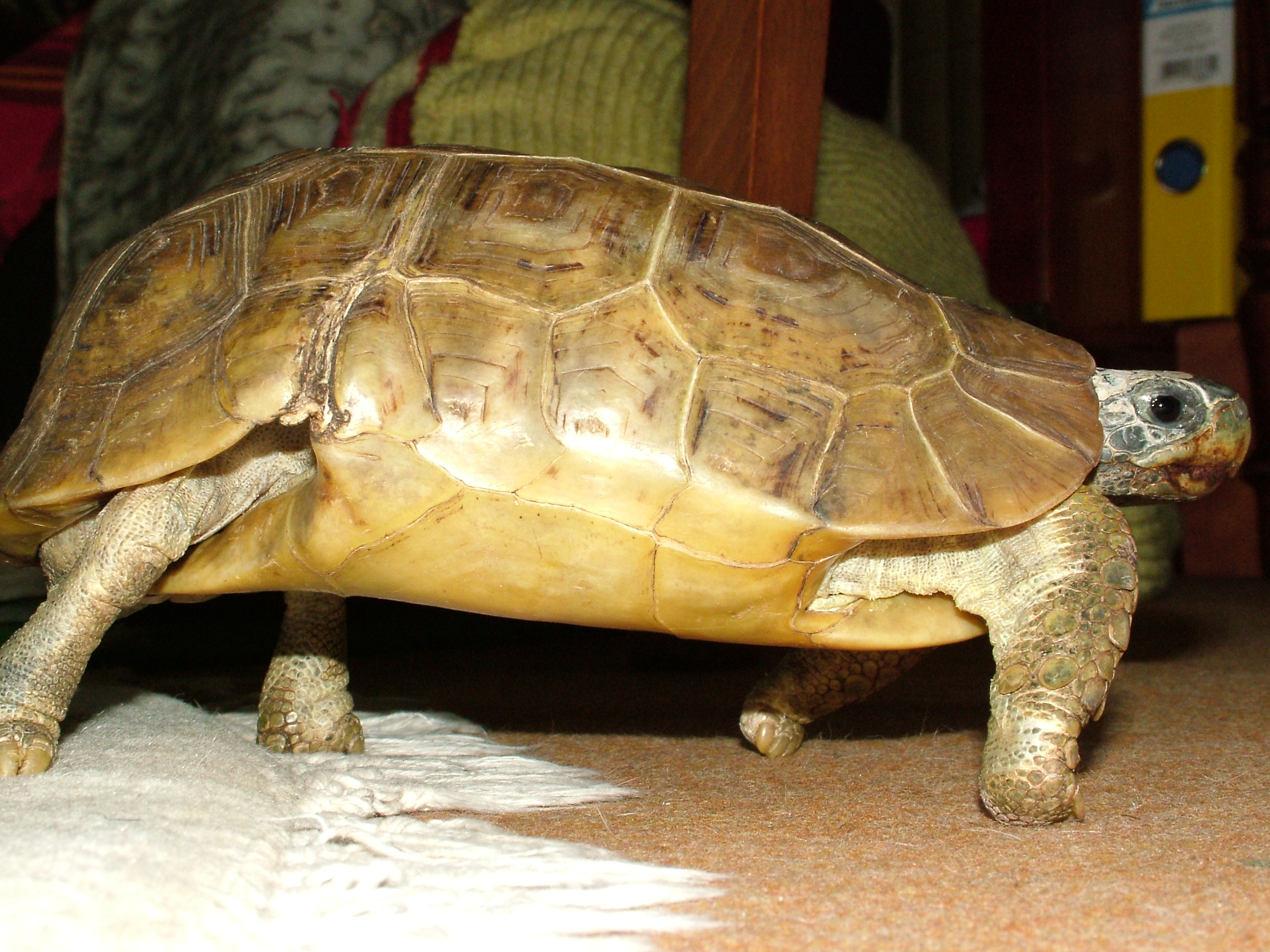
- Kinixys nogueyi

Scientific classification
- Kingdom: Animalia
- Phylum: Chordata
- Class: Reptilia
- Order: Testudines
- Suborder: Cryptodira
- Family: Testudinidae
- Genus: Kinixys; Bell, 1827

= Kinixys =

Genus of tortoises

Kinixys is a genus of turtles in the family Testudinidae. The genus was erected by Thomas Bell in 1827. The species in the genus Kinixys are native to Sub-Saharan Africa and Madagascar and commonly known as hinged tortoises or hinge-back tortoises.

Most of the Kinixys species are omnivores. They feed mainly on a wide range of different leaves, weeds, roots, flowers and fruits. However, they also eat worms, insects and other small invertebrates.

== Species ==
The following species are recognised in the genus Kinixys:

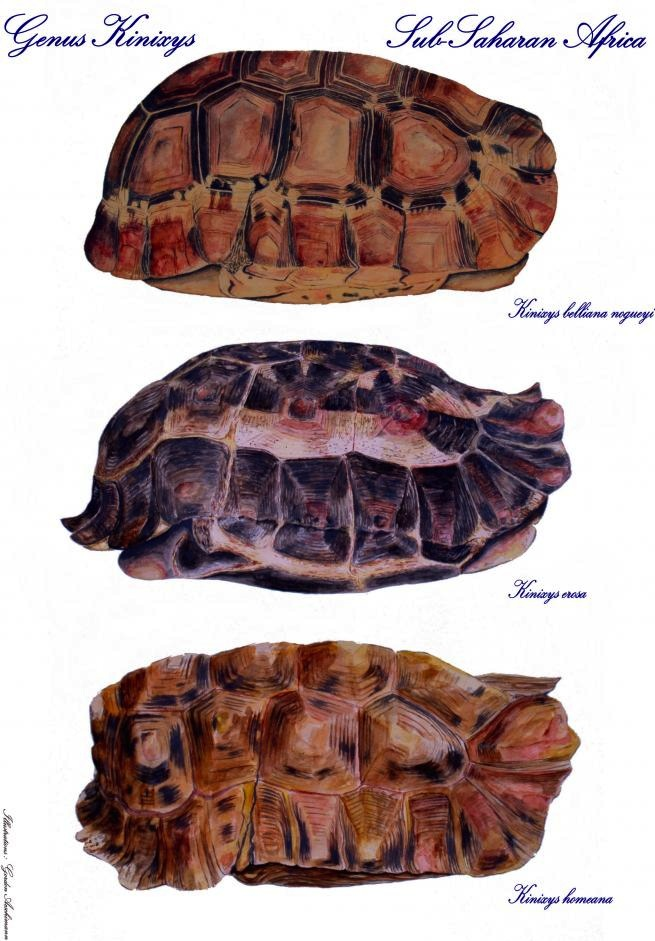
Three species of Kinixys: K. nogueyi, K. erosa, K. homeana. (Illustration G. Aeschimann).

Image	Species	Common name
	Kinixys belliana (Gray, 1830)	Bell's hinge-back tortoise
	Kinixys erosa (Schweigger, 1812)	forest hinge-back tortoise
	Kinixys homeana Bell, 1827	Home's hinge-back tortoise
	Kinixys lobatsiana (Power, 1927)	Lobatse hinge-back tortoise
	Kinixys natalensis Hewitt, 1935	Natal hinge-back tortoise
	Kinixys nogueyi Hewitt, 1935	Western hinge-back tortoise
	Kinixys spekii Gray, 1863	Speke's hinge-back tortoise
	Kinixys zombensis Hewitt, 1931	Eastern hinge-back tortoise

Nota bene: A binomial authority in parentheses indicates that the species was originally described in a genus other than Kinixys.

== Distribution and habitat ==
The several species of the genus Kinxys are found across much of tropical and sub-tropical sub-Saharan Africa, ranging as far south as KwaZulu-Natal in South Africa, and as far north as the fringes of the Sahel and Sahara. However, individuals are often very scarce within this range, and several species are threatened.

Though the species' wide geographic ranges overlap considerably, they are separated from each other by favouring different habitats within this range. Some species (such as K. belliana) favour open savannah or grasslands, others (such as K. homeana) favour rainforest.

== Parasites ==
Species of tortoises in the genus Kinixys play host to a number of ectoparasites (external) and endoparasites (internal). A survey (by Alan Probert & Clive Humphreys) of mixed captive K. spekii and K. belliana (mostly K. spekii) in Zimbabwe showed that the following parasites were known to infest/infect this species. This had been observed and published by others too. However some of the tiny roundworms (photographed under scanning electron microscope) are very likely new species and as yet remain undescribed.

- Ticks (Arachnida)
- Roundworms (Nematoda) – Angusticium, Atractis and Tachygontria
