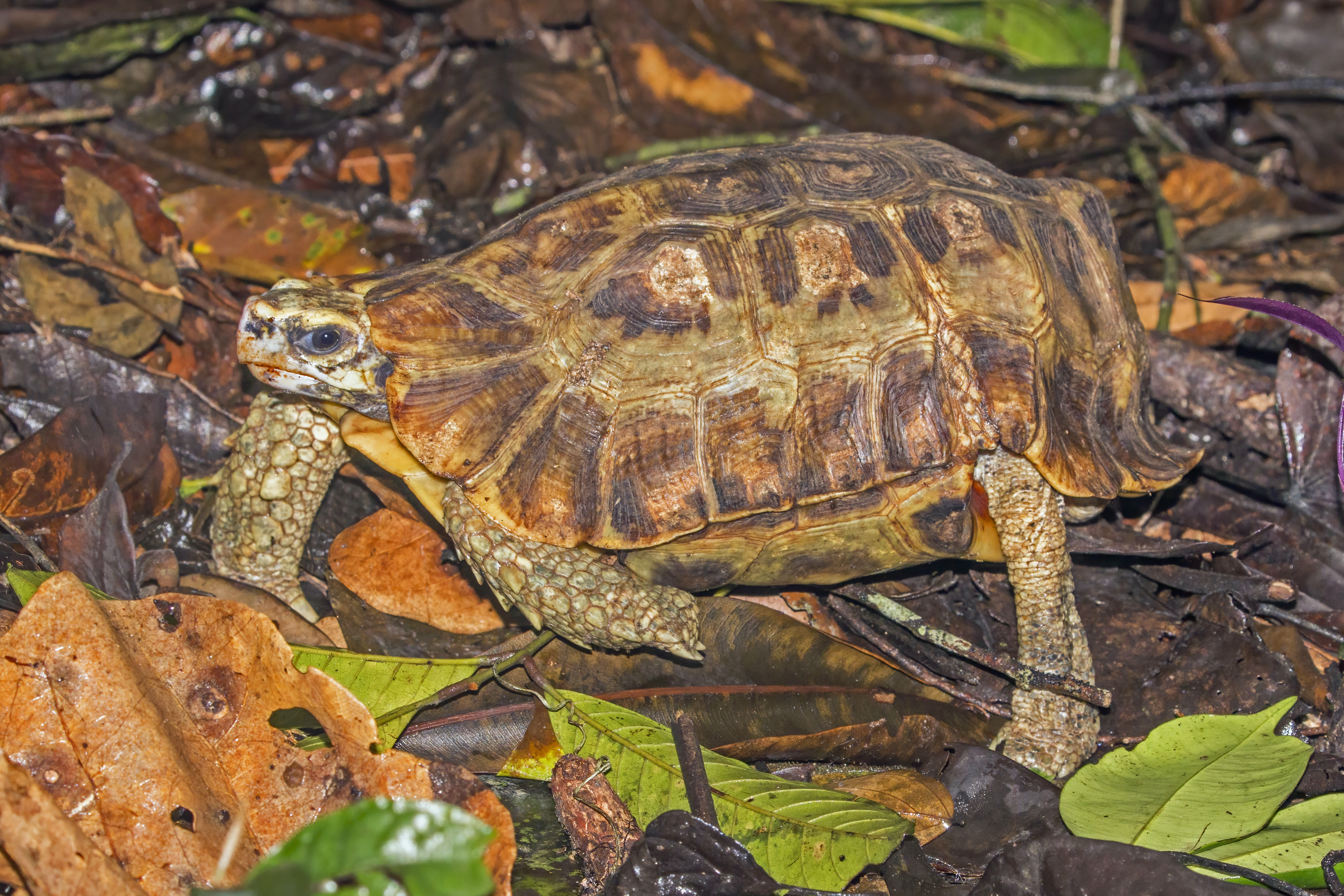
- In Kakum National Park, Ghana

Conservation status
- Critically Endangered (IUCN 3.1)

Scientific classification
- Kingdom: Animalia
- Phylum: Chordata
- Class: Reptilia
- Order: Testudines
- Suborder: Cryptodira
- Family: Testudinidae
- Genus: Kinixys
- Species: K. homeana

Binomial name
- Kinixys homeana Bell, 1827

Synonyms
- Kinixys homeana Bell, 1827; Cinixys homeana — Wagler, 1830; Testudo (Kinyxis) homeana — Gray, 1831; Kinixys belliana homeana — Nutaphand, 1979

= Home's hinge-back tortoise =

Species of tortoise

Home's hinge-back tortoise (Kinixys homeana) is a species of tortoise in the family Testudinidae. The species is endemic to Africa.

== Etymology ==
The specific name, homeana, is in honor of English surgeon and naturalist Everard Home.

== Geographic range ==
K. homeana is found in Benin, Cameroon, Democratic Republic of the Congo, Equatorial Guinea, Gabon, Ghana, Guinea, Ivory Coast, Liberia, Nigeria, and possibly Togo.

== Habitat ==
The natural habitats of Home's hinge-back tortoise are subtropical or tropical moist lowland forests, subtropical or tropical swamps, and plantations.

== Ecology and life history ==
Home's hinge-back tortoise is naturally attracted to red or pink flowers. It prefers low light and often moves in early morning or dusk, preferring to stay hidden the rest of the day.

== Diet ==
In captivity the diet of K. homeana may include, banana, guava, watermelon, black mushrooms, cooked sweet potato, cooked potato, and cooked or raw squash, and sources of animal protein such as earthworms, mealworms, crickets, snails and fish.

== Conservation status ==
K. homeana is threatened by habitat loss.
