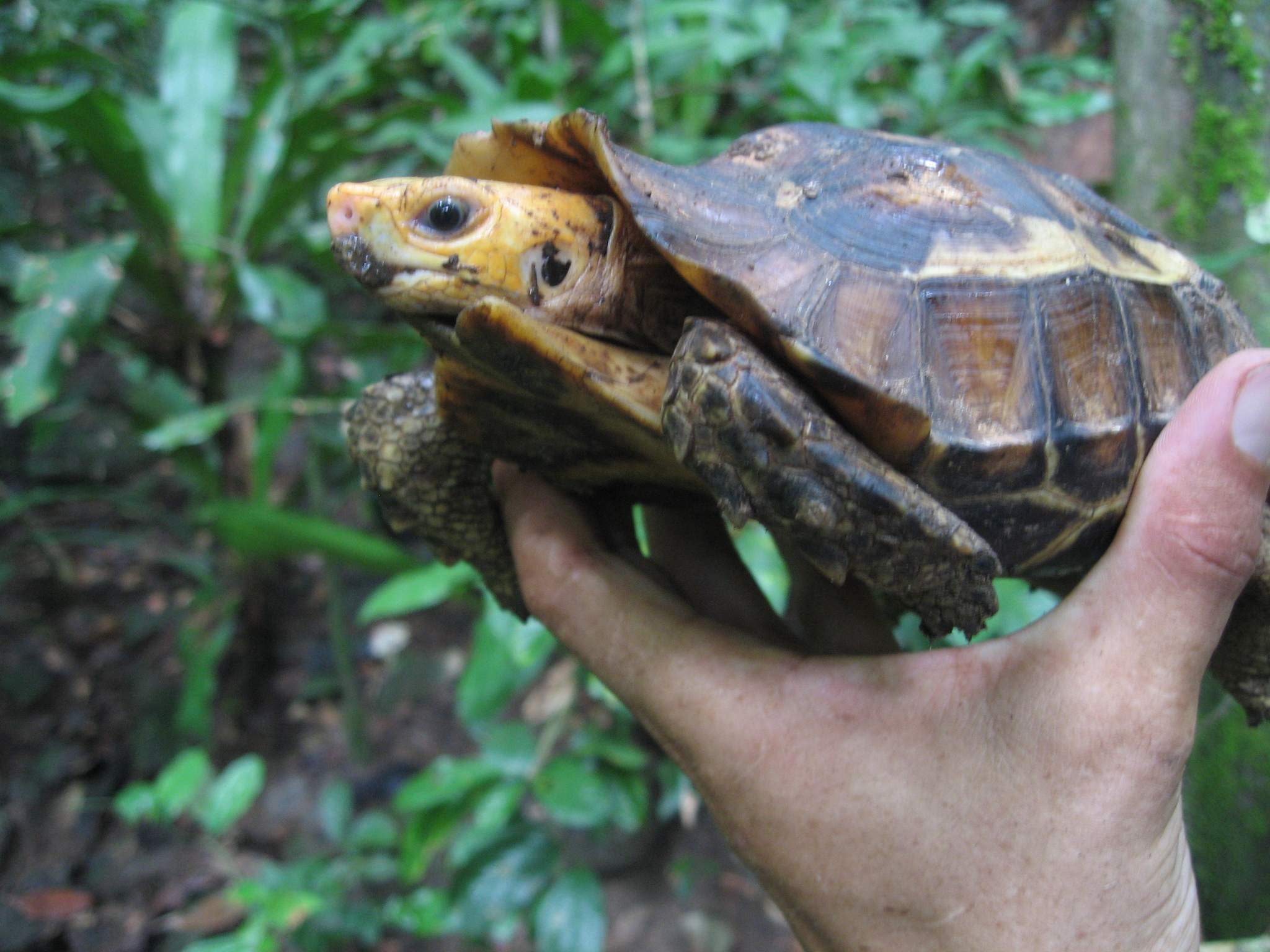

Conservation status
- Data Deficient (IUCN 2.3)

Scientific classification
- Kingdom: Animalia
- Phylum: Chordata
- Class: Reptilia
- Order: Testudines
- Suborder: Cryptodira
- Family: Testudinidae
- Genus: Kinixys
- Species: K. erosa

Binomial name
- Kinixys erosa (Schweigger, 1812)

Synonyms
- List: Testudo erosa Schweigger, 1812; Testudo schoepfii Fitzinger, 1826 (nomen nudum); Kinixys castanea Bell, 1827; Kinixys erosa — Gray, 1831; Cinixys erosa — A.M.C. Duméril & Bibron, 1835; Cinixys (Cinixys) castanea — Fitzinger, 1835.; Kinixys belliana erosa — Nutaphand, 1979

= Forest hinge-back tortoise =

Species of tortoise

The forest hinge-back tortoise (Kinixys erosa), also known commonly as the serrated hinge-back tortoise or Schweigger's tortoise, is a species of tortoise in the family Testudinidae. The species is indigenous to the tropical forests and marshes of central and western Africa.

== Geographic range and habitat ==
The forest hinge-back tortoise is indigenous to the tropical rainforests of Sub-Saharan Africa. Here it is often found in marshes and river banks, where it spends much of its time buried under roots and logs.

Its natural range extends from northern Angola, throughout the Congo Basin, as far east as the shores of Lake Victoria, and throughout the West African forests as far as Senegal. Specifically, it is found in Angola, Burkina Faso, Cameroon, Central African Republic, Republic of the Congo, Democratic Republic of the Congo, Ivory Coast, Equatorial Guinea, Gabon, Gambia, Ghana, Guinea, Liberia, Nigeria, Rwanda, Senegal, Sierra Leone, Uganda, possibly Benin, possibly Guinea-Bissau, and possibly Togo.

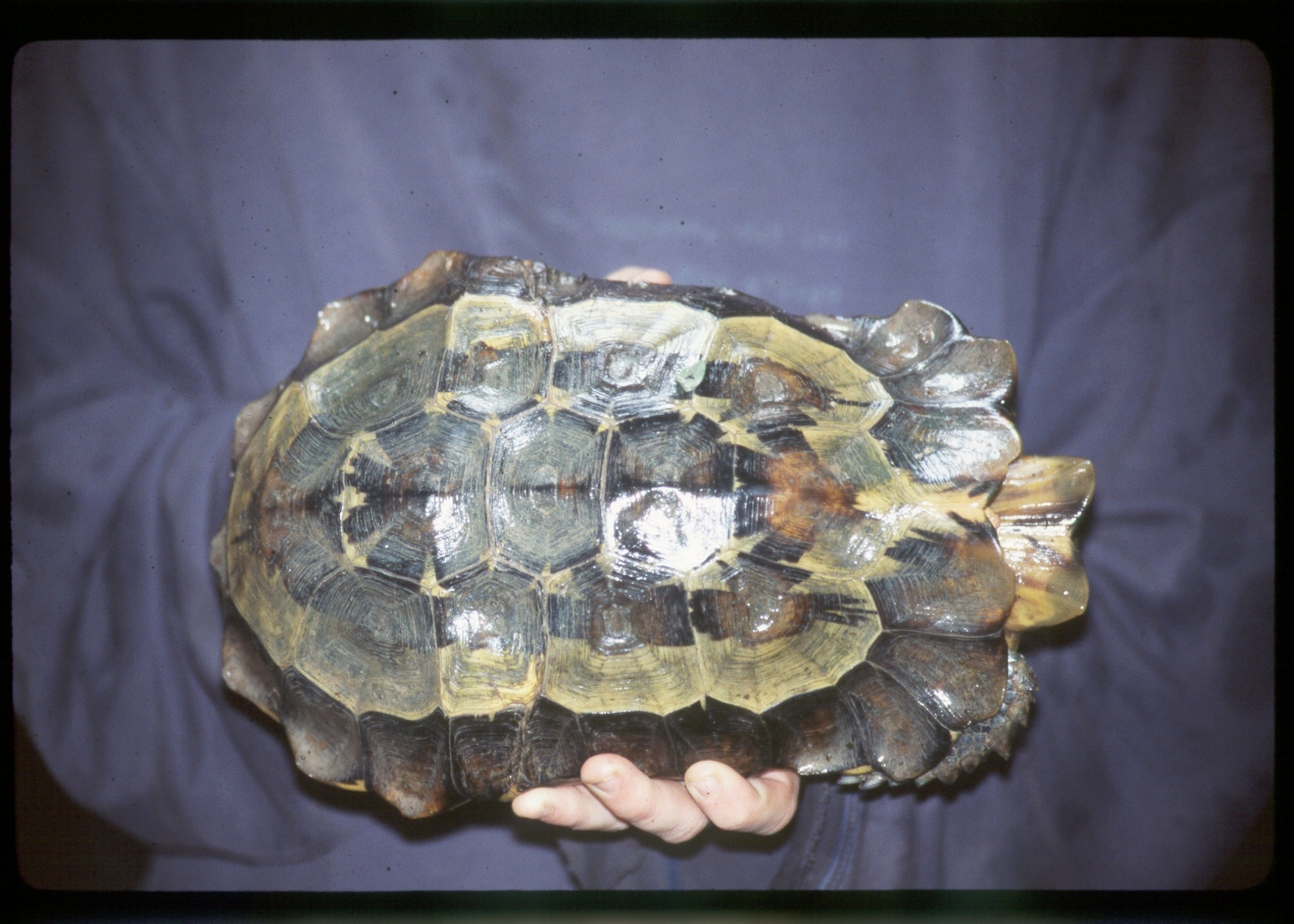
In Uganda

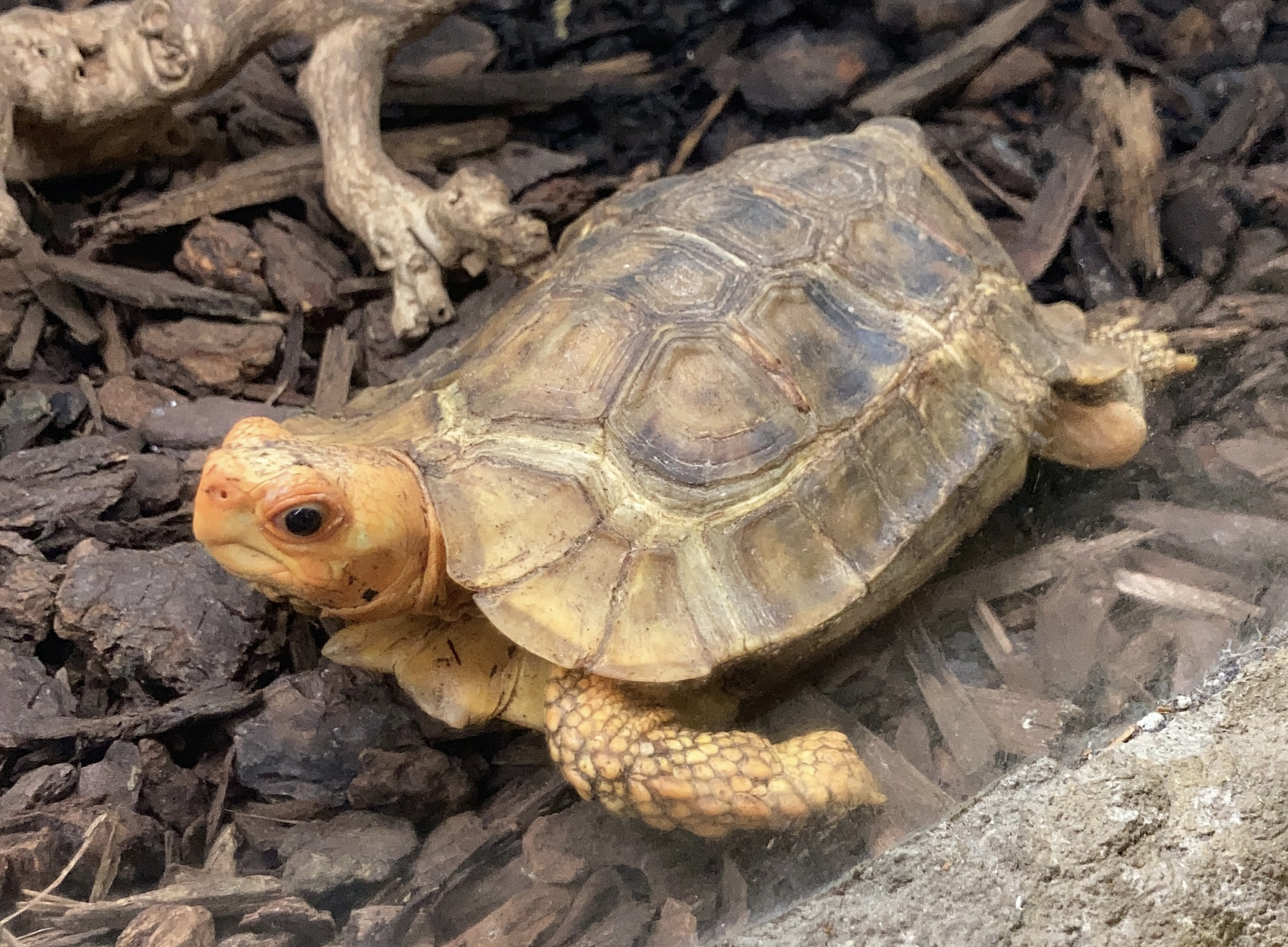
At The Reptile Zoo

== Behavior ==
K. erosa can arch its back 90 degrees downwards to protect its tail and hind legs while sleeping and to protect itself from predators. It is an excellent swimmer and can dive and navigate rainforest water-bodies to search for food.

== Reproduction ==
The female K. erosa lays up to 4 eggs on the ground, covered in leaves.

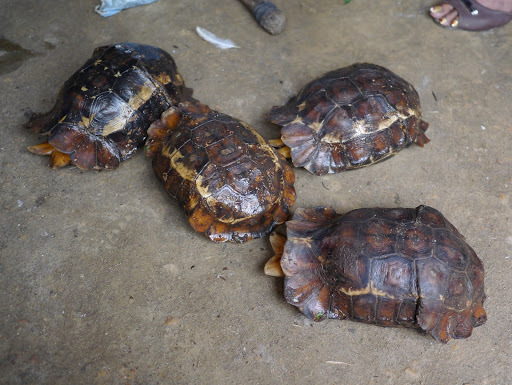
Live tortoises hunted for the bushmeat market in Litoral, Equatorial Guinea

== Diet ==
The forest hinge-back tortoise is omnivorous, feeding on edible leaves, grass, invertebrates, carrion, weeds, and fruits.

== Threats ==
K. erosa is hunted locally for bush meat, and its range has retreated due to clearance of its rainforest habitat. The forest hinge-back tortoise is considered to be threatened in the long-term, primarily due to habitat destruction.
