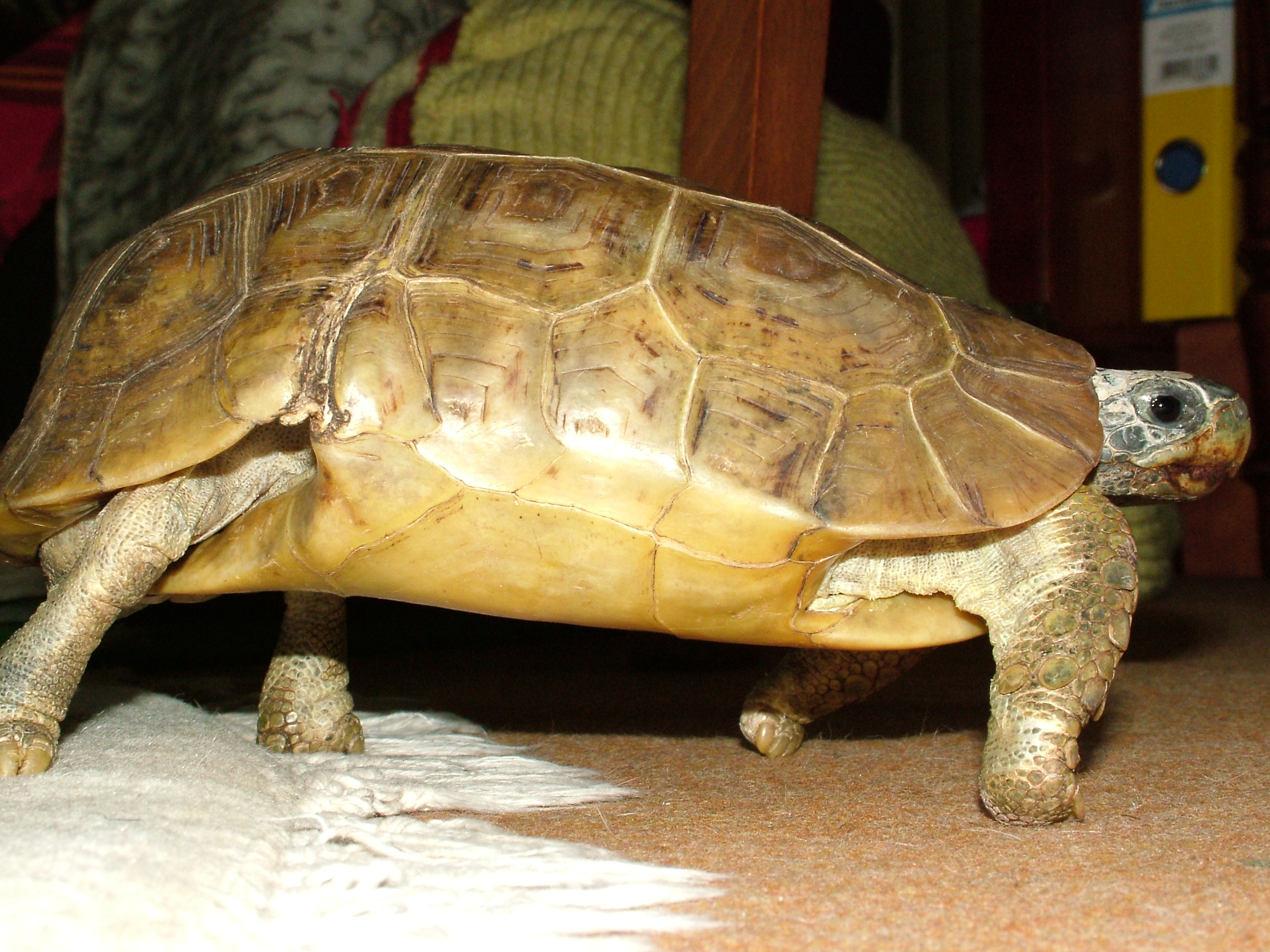
- Kinixys belliana "nogueyi"

Conservation status
- Least Concern (IUCN 2.3)

Scientific classification
- Kingdom: Animalia
- Phylum: Chordata
- Class: Reptilia
- Order: Testudines
- Suborder: Cryptodira
- Family: Testudinidae
- Genus: Kinixys
- Species: K. belliana

Binomial name
- Kinixys belliana Gray, 1831

Synonyms
- Kinixys belliana belliana: Testudo (Kinyxis) belliana Gray, 1831; Kinixys belliana — Gray, 1831; Cinixys (Cinothorax) belliana — Fitzinger, 1835; Cinothorax bellianus — Fitzinger, 1843; Kinixys schoensis Rüppell, 1845; Kinixys belliana zombensis Hewitt, 1931; Kinixys belliana zuluensis Hewitt, 1931; Kinixys belliana belliana — Mertens, L. Müller & Rust, 1934; Kinixys zuluensis — Hewitt, 1937; Kinixys zombensis — F. J. Mitchell, 1946; Kinixys belliana schoensis — Mertens & Wermuth, 1955; Kinixys belliana mertensi Laurent, 1956; Madakinixys domerguei Vuillemin, 1972; Kinixys shoensis [sic] Pritchard, 1979 (ex errore); Madakinixys domergei [sic] Gaffney, 1979 (ex errore); Kinixys belliana domerguei — Bour, 1985; Kinixys belliana nogueyi: Homopus nogueyi Lataste, 1886; Cinixys dorri Lataste, 1888; Cinixys nogueyi — Siebenrock, 1903; Kinixys nogueyi — Hewitt, 1931; Kinixys belliana nogueyi — Mertens, L. Müller & Rust, 1934

= Bell's hinge-back tortoise =

Species of African reptile

Bell's hinge-back tortoise (Kinixys belliana), also known commonly as Bell's eastern hinged tortoise, is a species of tortoise in the family Testudinidae. The species is native to central Africa. It has the hinge that characterizes all tortoises in the genus Kinixys. There are no recognized subspecies.

== Etymology ==
Both the specific name, belliana, and the common name are in honor of English zoologist Thomas Bell.

== Description ==
Bell's hinge-back tortoise is a medium-sized light brown tortoise. They can grow up to 22 cm. On the back of its shell, the tortoise has a 90 degree hinge which, when closed, can protect its rear legs and tail from predators. This broad band of flexible connective tissue is located between the 4th and 5th costals and the 7th and 8th peripherals in adults.

The scutes on its slightly domed and elongated shell typically have a radiating pattern of dark patches, though these can fade. Adult males have a concave belly. Most Bell's hinge-backs have five claws on each forefoot.

== Distribution and habitat ==
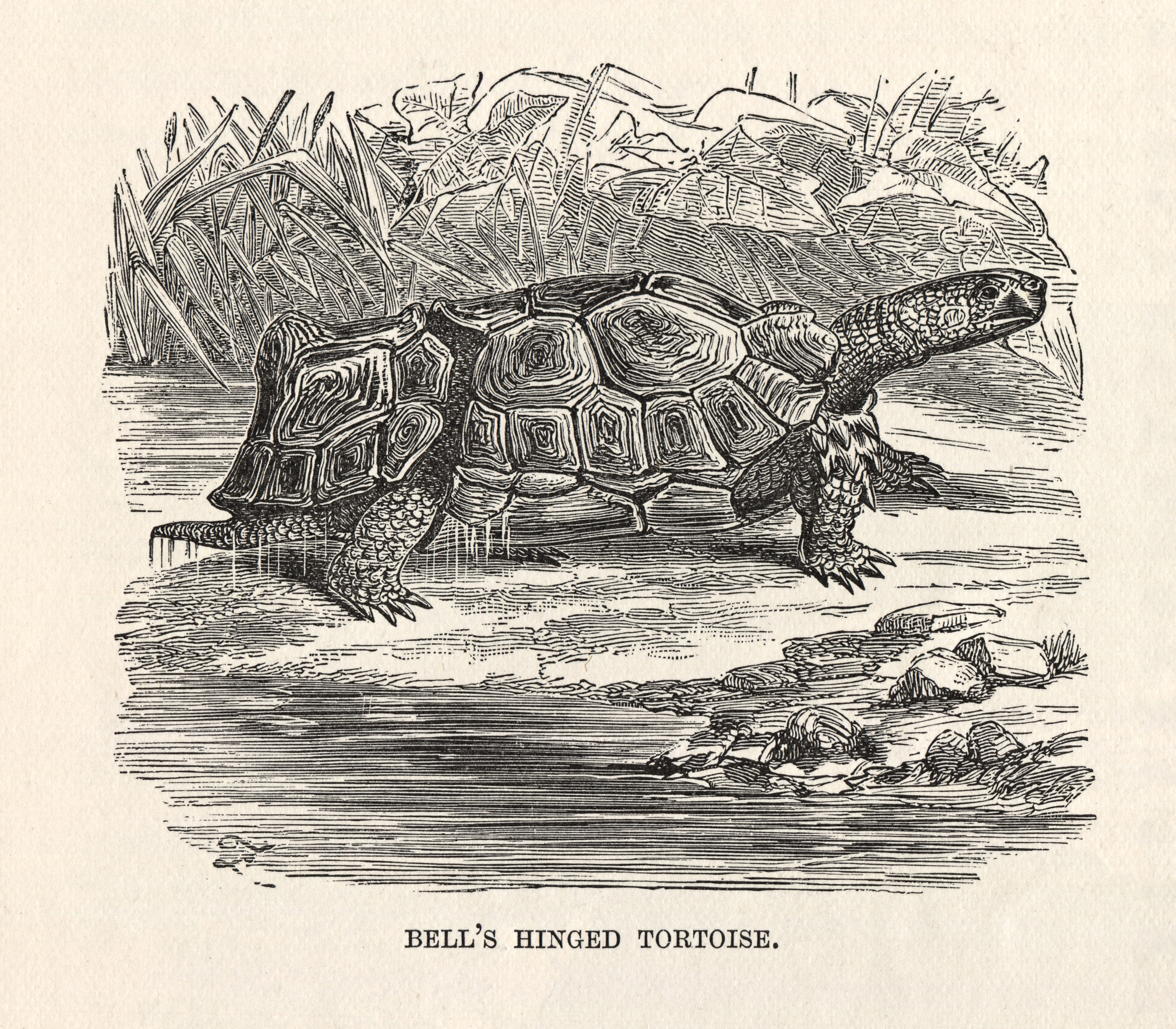
Engraving of Bell's Hinge-back tortoise from "The Royal Natural History" (1896).

In its habitat, Bell's hinge-back tortoise favours tropical and sub-tropical savannahs of sub-Saharan Africa.

It was traditionally considered to be the most common and widespread hinge-back tortoise, found throughout a large part of sub-Saharan Africa such as in Sudan, Tanzania, the Democratic Republic of the Congo and down to southern Africa. However, a revision of the species advocated by Kindler et al. (2012) restricted it only to the central African populations, ranging from Angola to Burundi.

== Diet ==
Bell's hinge-back tortoise is an omnivore, with a very varied diet consisting mainly of a range of different plants, but also including insects and other meat.

It feeds on vegetables, twigs, roots, leaves, fruits, earthworms, snails, tadpoles and other small invertebrates.

== Threats and conservation ==
In its natural habitat, its predators are leopards, hawks and eagles.

Currently it is mainly threatened by widespread collection from the wild for the illegal international trade in the species. It is also collected by local peoples for food and human population growth in the area is putting pressure on the species. Human-induced fire is also a threat.

Its shells are used as musical instruments by the priests of the Oroko and other peoples of southwestern Cameroon to accompany religious incantations.

As of March 22, 2000, the USDA has banned importation of the Bell's hinge-back tortoise, leopard tortoise and the African spurred tortoise.

== Subspecies ==
No subspecies are currently recognized as being valid. Formerly the following subspecies were recognized:

- K. b. belliana – Bell's hinge-back
- K. b. domerguei – Madagascan hinge-back
- K. b. nogueyi – western hinge-back
- K. b. zombensis – southeastern hinge-back

Kindler et al. (2012) raised the subspecies K. b. zombensis (which they considered a senior synonym of K. b. domerguei) and K. b. nogueyi to the ranks of species, respectively Kinixys zombensis and Kinixys nogueyi. K. b. domerguei is now treated as subspecies of Kinixys zombensis (i.e., Kinixys zombensis domerguei).

== Parasites of hinge-back tortoises ==
Kinixys tortoises play host to a number of ectoparasites (external) and endoparasites (internal) A survey (by Alan Probert & Clive Humphreys) of mixed captive K. spekii and K. belliana (mostly K. spekii) in Zimbabwe showed that ticks (Arachnida) and roundworms (Nematoda) of genera Angusticium, Atractis and Tachygontria infect these tortoises. This has been reported by others as well. However, some of the tiny roundworms (photographed under SEM) are very likely new species and as yet remain undescribed.
