= The Reptile Zoo =

Zoo in Fountain Valley, California

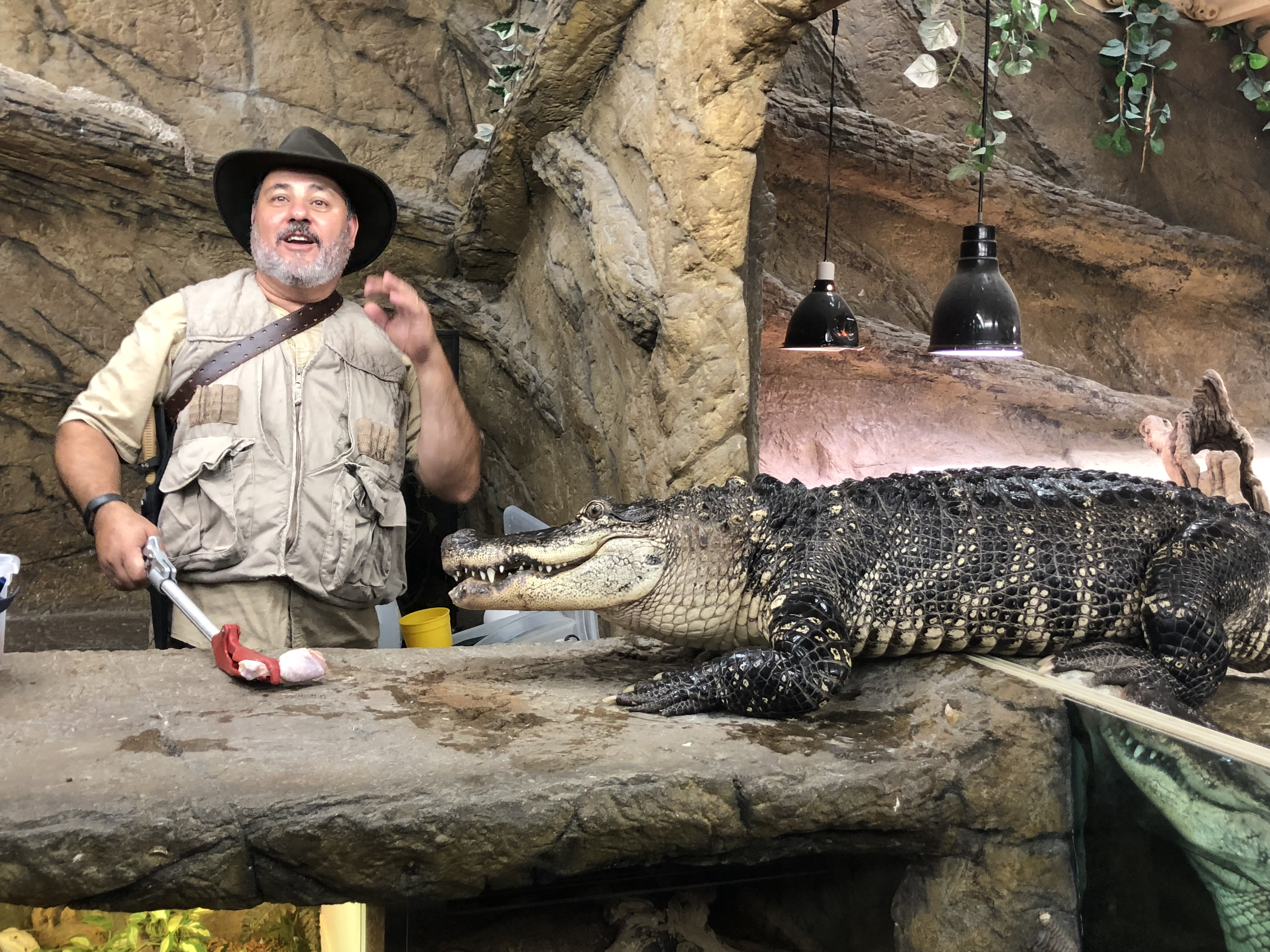
- Jay Brewer, the founder, at the zoo with an American alligator in 2018
- Interactive map of The Reptile Zoo
- 33.689946°N 117.953338°W
- Date opened: July 10, 2009
- Location: Fountain Valley, California, United States
- Floor space: 13,000 square feet (1,200 m^{2})
- No. of animals: Over 100
- No. of species: Over 100
- Owner: Jay Brewer
- Website: www.thereptilezoo.com

The Reptile Zoo is an indoor zoo focusing on reptiles in Fountain Valley, California. Fish, amphibians, and arachnids are also on display. It contains the pet store Prehistoric Pets, which sells items targeted towards reptile owners. Over 1,000,000 people have visited the zoo since its founding. Frank, an Asian water monitor and animal actor, lived at the zoo until his death in 2021.

== History ==
Prehistoric Pets originally opened in 1988 under the name Pet Country, which sold both traditional and exotic pets. As more people visited the store, the focus shifted to education about exotic reptiles. Pet Country then closed and Prehistoric Pets opened in 1992.

The company then created Jurassic Parties in 1995, which allowed for more learning about reptiles via interactive events. Jay Brewer, and ex-fisherman and the founder of the store, decided to build an indoor zoo next to the shop to attract visitors. After being founded on July 10, 2009, people started visiting the shop just to see the reptiles at the zoo.

The store expanded to its current 13,000 square feet (1,200 m^{2}) in two expansions during 2000 and 2018.

The corporation has about 50 staff members, per LinkedIn and their websites, including Brewer and his three daughters.

== Animals ==
The zoo contains the following species, which include:

- African spurred tortoise
- Aldabra giant tortoise
- Alligator snapping turtle
- American alligator
- Arboreal ratsnake
- Argentine black and white tegu
- Asian water monitor
- Baja blue rock lizard
- Ball python
- Black pond turtle
- Black tree monitor
- Blood python
- Brown rainbow boa
- Burmese python
- Butterfly peacock bass
- Central bearded dragon
- Checkered garter snake
- Chinese water dragon
- Common blue-tongued skink
- Common box turtle
- Common chuckwalla
- Common snapping turtle
- Crested gecko
- Crocodile monitor
- Cunningham's spiny-tailed skink
- Cuvier's dwarf caiman
- Desert monitor
- Desert tortoise
- Dumeril's boa
- Eastern diamondback rattlesnake
- Egyptian sand boa
- Emerald tree boa
- Emerald tree skink
- False water cobra
- Flat rock scorpion
- Forest hinge-back tortoise
- Frilled lizard
- Galápagos tortoise
- Giant gourami
- Gray's monitor
- Greek tortoise
- Green anaconda
- Green iguana
- Green tree python
- Indian python
- Indonesian blue-tongued skink
- Jamaican boa
- Japanese pond turtle
- Knight anole
- Koi
- Lace monitor
- Leopard gecko
- Madagascar giant day gecko
- Mangrove monitor
- Mangrove snake
- Mexican beaded lizard
- Midget faded rattlesnake
- Northern caiman lizard
- Olive python
- Oscar
- Panther chameleon
- Papuan python
- Peach-throated monitor
- Pig-nosed turtle
- Pond slider
- Radiated tortoise
- Rankin's dragon
- Redtail catfish
- Red tegu
- Reticulated python
- Rhinoceros iguana
- Rock monitor
- Roughneck monitor
- Saltwater crocodile
- Savannah monitor
- Schneider's skink
- Silver arowana
- Smooth-fronted caiman
- Solomon Island spiny monitor
- Solomon Islands skink
- Spiny softshell turtle
- Southern Pacific rattlesnake
- Speckled kingsnake
- Sudan plated lizard
- Tambaqui
- Texas rat snake
- Three-toed box turtle
- Tree-crevice skink
- Western diamondback rattlesnake
- Yellow anaconda
- Yellow-headed water monitor
- Zebra tilapia

The zoo was home to Twinkie, the world's largest albino snake in captivity, according Guinness World Records, who died in 2014 at 11 years old. At 23 feet (7.0 m) long and 370 pounds (170 kg), she had also appeared on The Tonight Show With Conan O'Brien. Frank, a monitor lizard from the show Jessie, also used to live at the zoo, along with a two-headed Texas rat snake.

Animals from the zoo come from many different places. Some were born at the zoo, while others are rescued from the wild or from private collections.

The zoo additionally contains a 2,000 US gallons (7,600 L) indoor pond housing fish and turtles.

== In popular culture ==
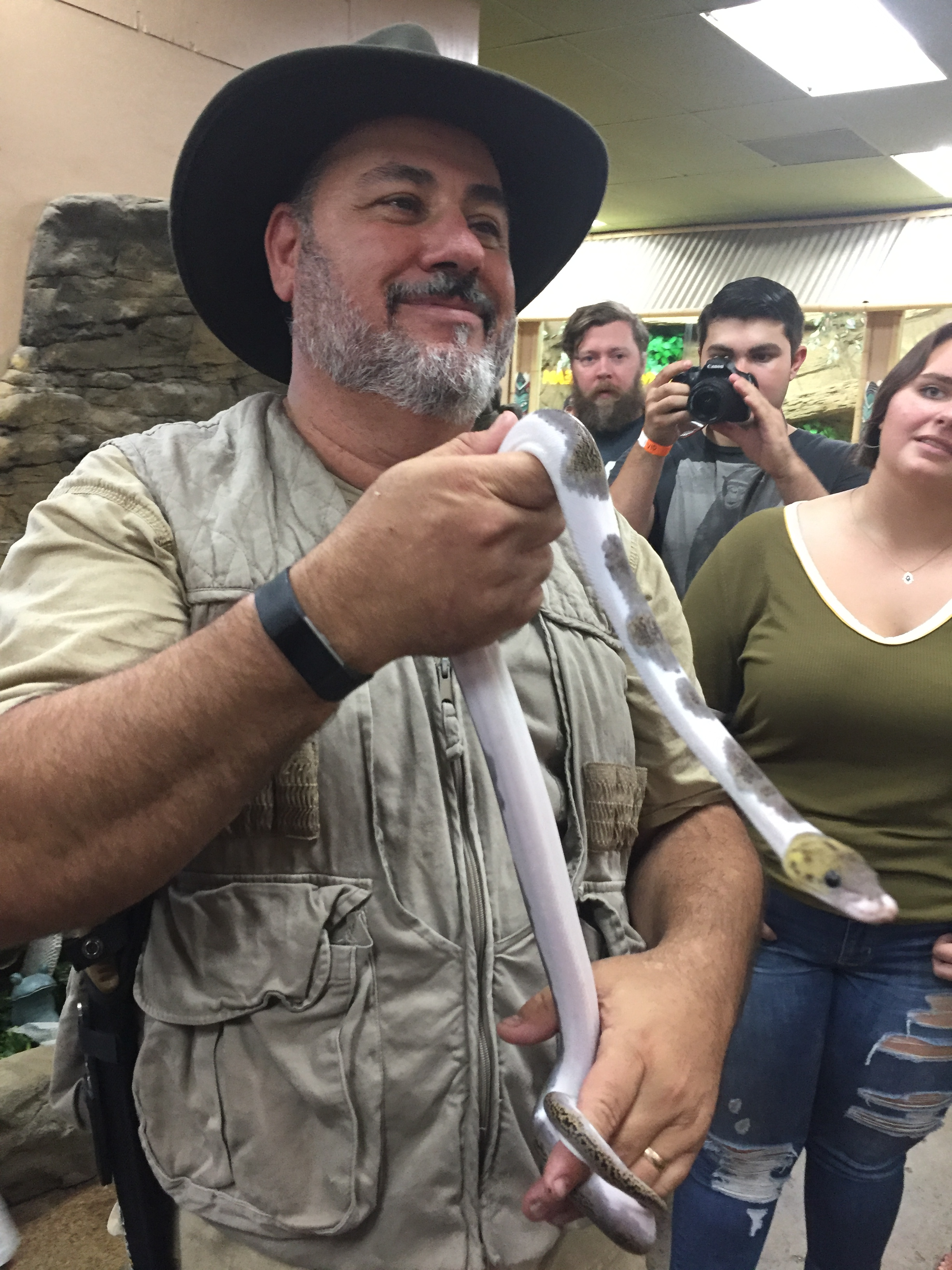
Brewer in 2018

Jay Brewer, the founder of the zoo, and his daughter Juliette have a prominent following on social media, with 2.1 million followers on Instagram and over 20 million followers on TikTok. On the latter, the zoo itself has 12 million followers. They have also collaborated with celebrities such as Snoop Dogg, Kevin Hart, and Diplo.

In 2023, Reptile Zoo was featured on The Roku Channel's reality show Reptile Royalty, a six-episode miniseries following the zoo’s day to day activity. The show was picked up for a second season in 2024.
