= Frank (lizard) =

Asian water monitor and animal actor (c. 2003 – 2021)

- Frank in 2018
- Species: Asian water monitor
- Sex: Male
- Hatched: c. October 19, 2003
- Died: c. October 23, 2021
- Occupation: Animal actor
- Notable role: Mrs. Kipling
- Years active: 2011–2015
- Owner: Jay Brewer
- Residence: The Reptile Zoo

Frank (c. October 19, 2003 - c. October 23, 2021) was an Asian water monitor and animal actor best known for his role as Mrs. Kipling on the American teen sitcom series Jessie. He was owned by Jay Brewer and lived at The Reptile Zoo in California until his death in 2021.

== Career ==
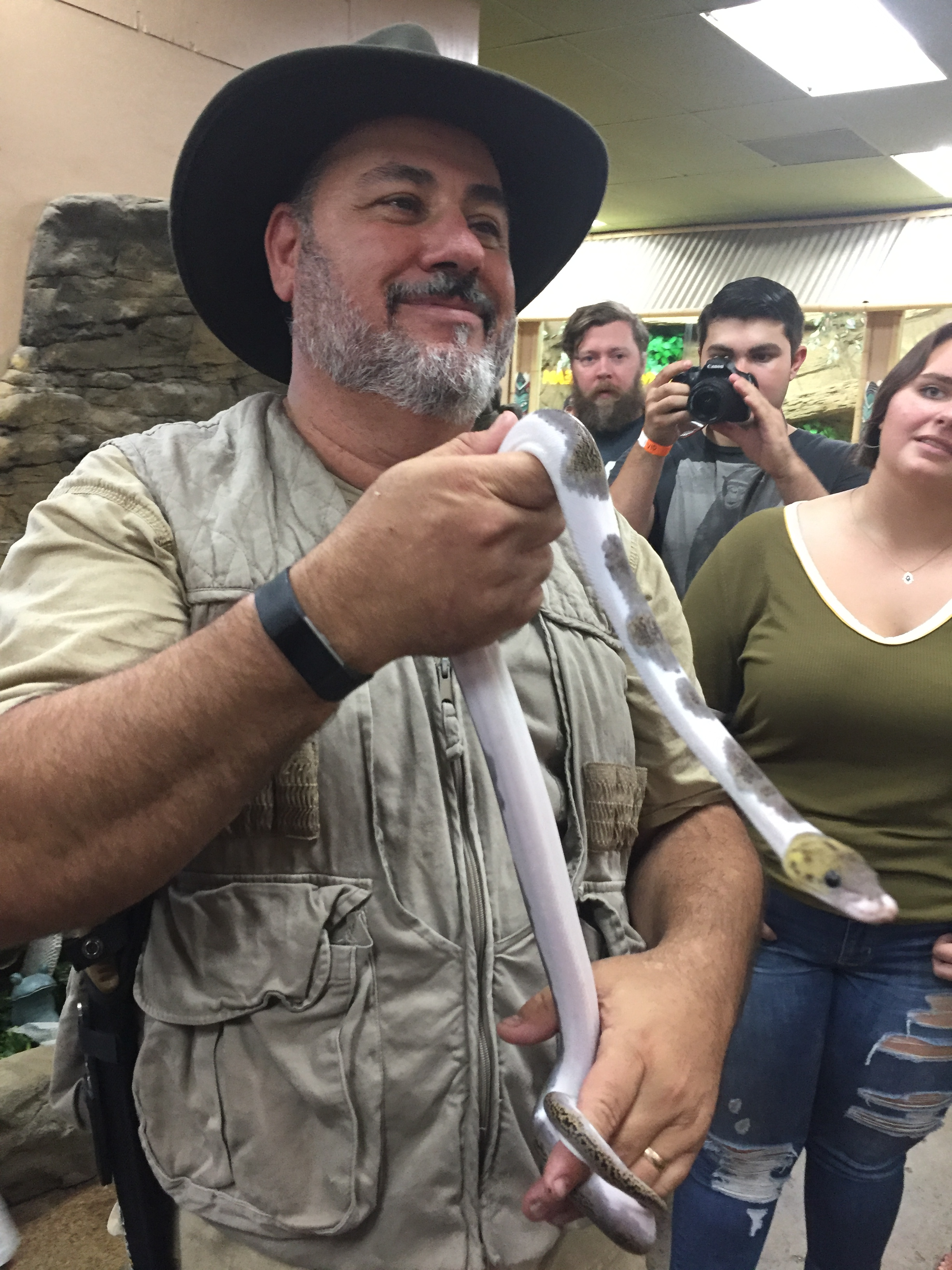
Jay Brewer, Frank's owner, in 2018

Disney Channel approached Jay Brewer in 2011 requesting a "big, tame lizard". Brewer chose Frank because of his calm disposition. Brewer compared Frank to a teddy bear, stating that he was "always dependable". Frank reprised his role as Mrs. Kipling in Bunk'd, a sequel series to Jessie.

=== Filmography ===
Title	Notes	Refs.
Jessie	Played the role of Mrs. Kipling	
Bunk'd	Reprised his role from Jessie	
Good Day L.A.	Breakfast television feature	
The Tonight Show with Jay Leno	Talk show feature	
The David Letterman Show	Talk show feature	
Conan	Talk show feature	

== Personal life ==
Frank lived in Jay Brewer's Reptile Zoo in Fountain Valley, California. He was known to wander around Prehistoric Pets, a pet store within the zoo.

On October 23, 2021, Jessie co-star Skai Jackson confirmed his death months before. According to her, he died at the age of 18, outliving 28 siblings. He left behind a nephew named Frank Jr.
