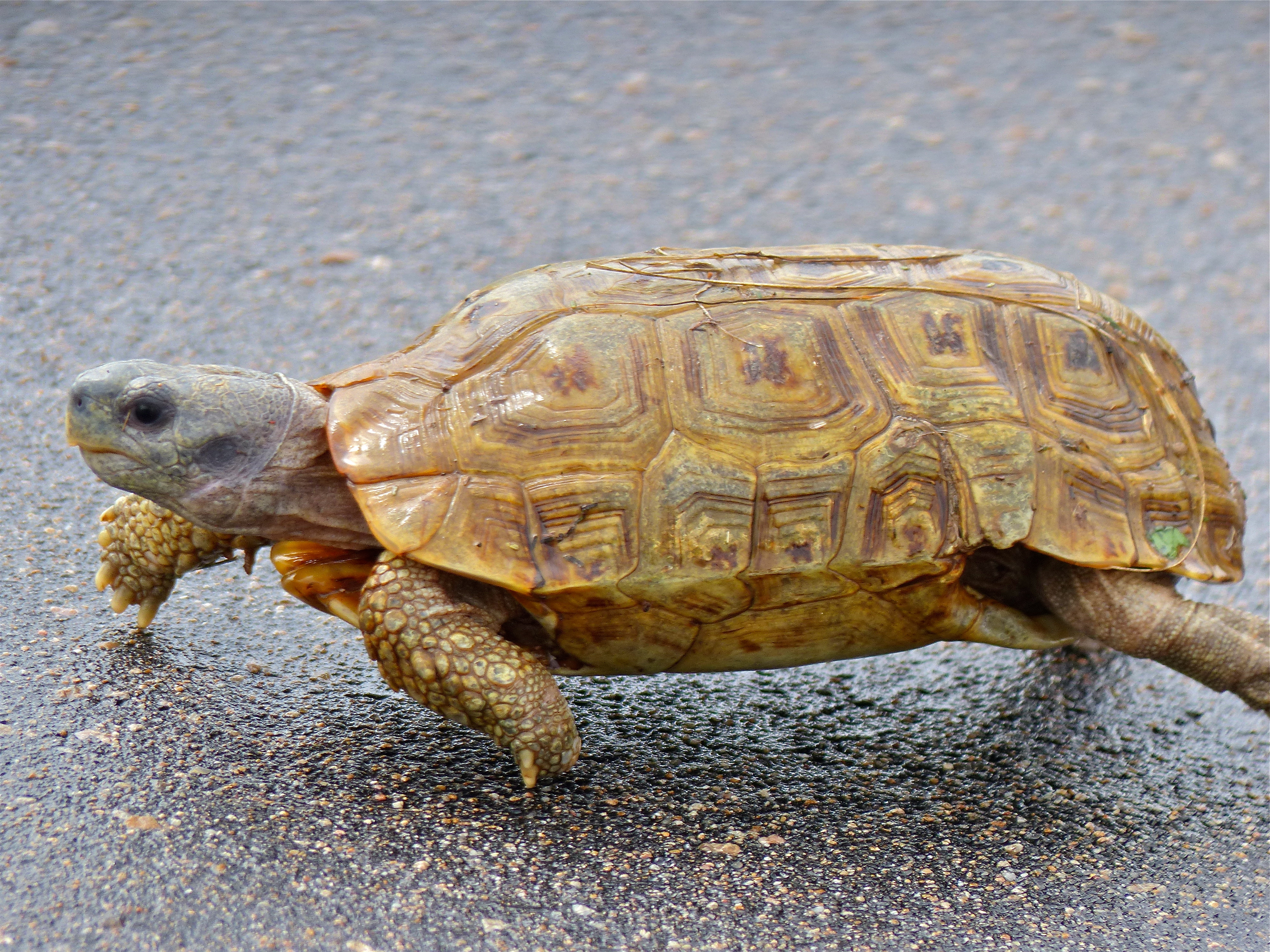
- Speke's hinge-back tortoise at Kruger National Park, South Africa

Scientific classification
- Kingdom: Animalia
- Phylum: Chordata
- Class: Reptilia
- Order: Testudines
- Suborder: Cryptodira
- Family: Testudinidae
- Genus: Kinixys
- Species: K. spekii

Binomial name
- Kinixys spekii Gray, 1863

Synonyms
- List: Kinixys spekii Gray, 1863; Cinixys spekii — Boulenger, 1889; Homopus darlingi Boulenger, 1902; Testudo procterae Loveridge, 1923; Kinixys australis Hewitt, 1931; Kinixys darlingi — Hewitt, 1931; Kinixys jordani Hewitt, 1931; Kinixys youngi Hewitt, 1931; Kinixys australis mababiensis V. FitzSimons, 1932; Kinixys australis australis — Mertens, L. Müller & Rust, 1934; Kinixys belliana spekei Mertens, Müller & Rust, 1934 (ex errore); Malacochersus procterae — Mertens, Müller & Rust, 1934; Kinixys belliana australis — Mertens & Wermuth, 1955; Kinixys belliana darlingi — Mertens & Wermuth, 1955; Kinixys belliana mababiensis — Mertens & Wermuth, 1955; Kinixys belliana spekii — Mertens & Wermuth, 1955

= Speke's hinge-back tortoise =

Species of tortoise

Speke's hinge-back tortoise (Kinixys spekii), also known commonly as Speke's hingeback tortoise, is a species of turtle in the family Testudinidae. The species is endemic to Africa.

== Etymology ==
The specific name, spekii, is in honor of English explorer John Hanning Speke.

== Description ==
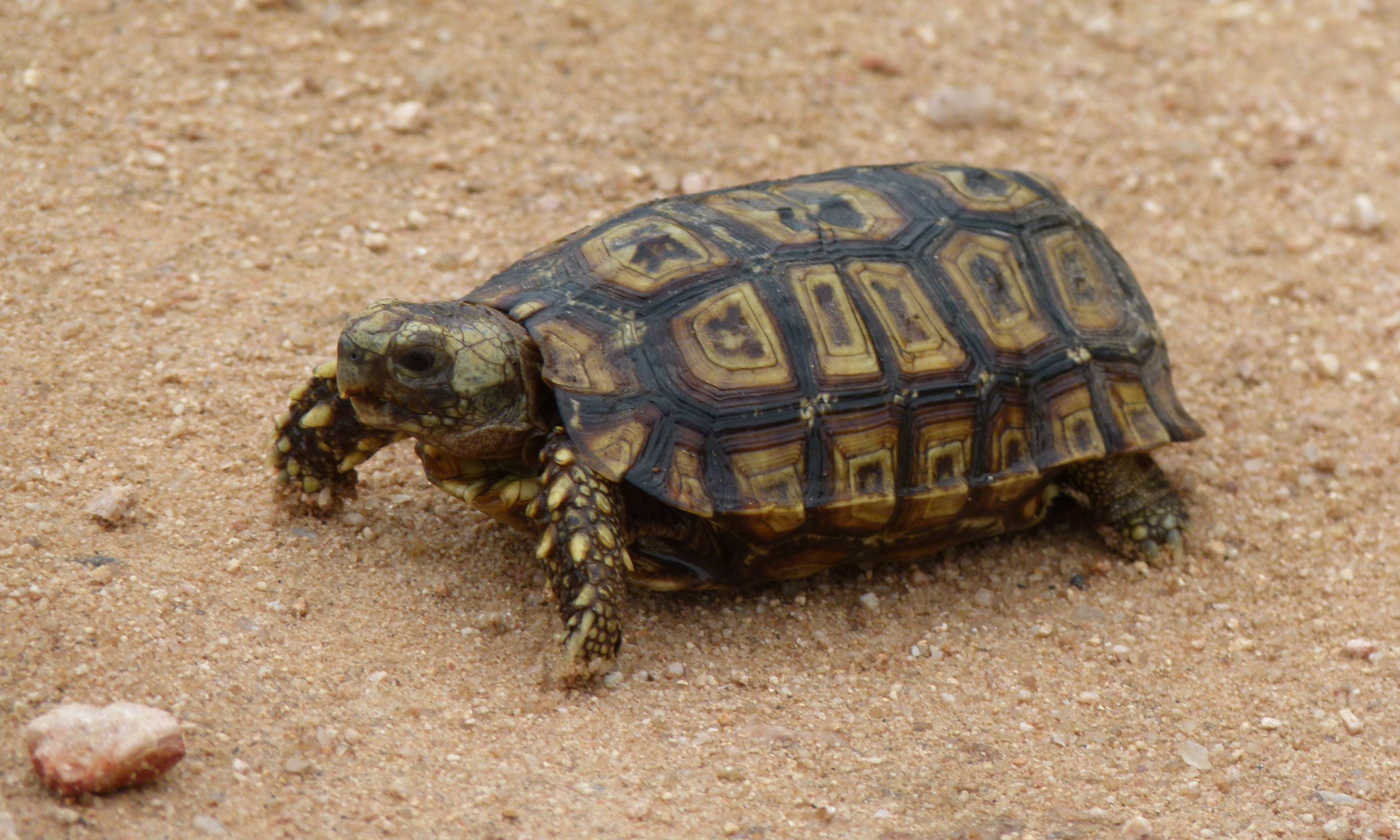
In Kruger National Park

K. spekii has an elongated carapace, up to 20 cm (7.9 in) in straight length, which is distinctly flattened, allowing it to seek refuge in rock crevices and under logs (the co-occurring pancake tortoise is even more flattened). Its carapace has a weak, disrupted medial keel, and posterior marginals that are neither strongly serrated nor reverted. This species has a well-developed hinge at the rear end of the upper part of its shell, permitting the protection of its rear legs after they have been retracted. The male has a notably longer tail than the female of this species, and the tails end in a spine. Females possess a flat plastron, yet males have a more concave one.

== Geographic range ==
Speke's hinge-back tortoise is found in East Africa from Uganda and Kenya south to Eswatini, next to Mozambique and Zululand. Its range extends westwards as far as the coast of Angola.

== Habitat ==
K. spekii inhabits savannahs and dry bush with rocky areas. It tends to inhabit more wooded areas during the dry season, and to move out into the savannahs when the summer rains come.

== Diet ==
K. spekii feeds on small flowers, leaves, grass, herbs, succulents and fungi. It also eats snails and other small invertebrates, having a special preference for millipedes.

== Reproduction ==
Females of K. spekii lay a small clutch of two to four eggs in the summer.
