= Jane S. Bell =

British scientific illustrator (1798–1873)

Jane Sarah Roberts Bell (1798-1873) was a British illustrator. Her illustrations of the African softshell turtle and pale-throated sloth's bone structures were published in A Monograph of the Testudinata and Transactions of the Zoological Society of London.

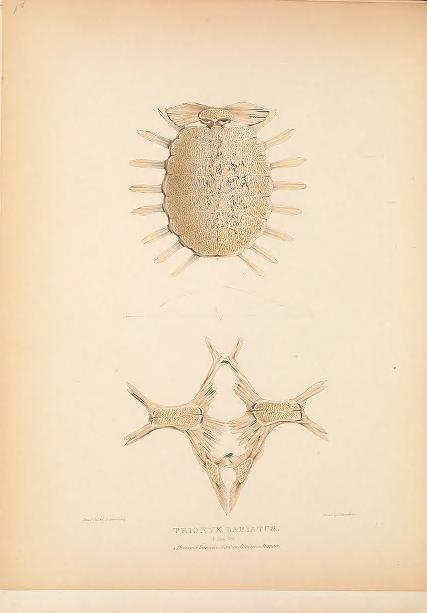
Illustration (Plate 18) for Thomas Bell's A Monograph of the Testudinata, illustrated by Jane S. Bell

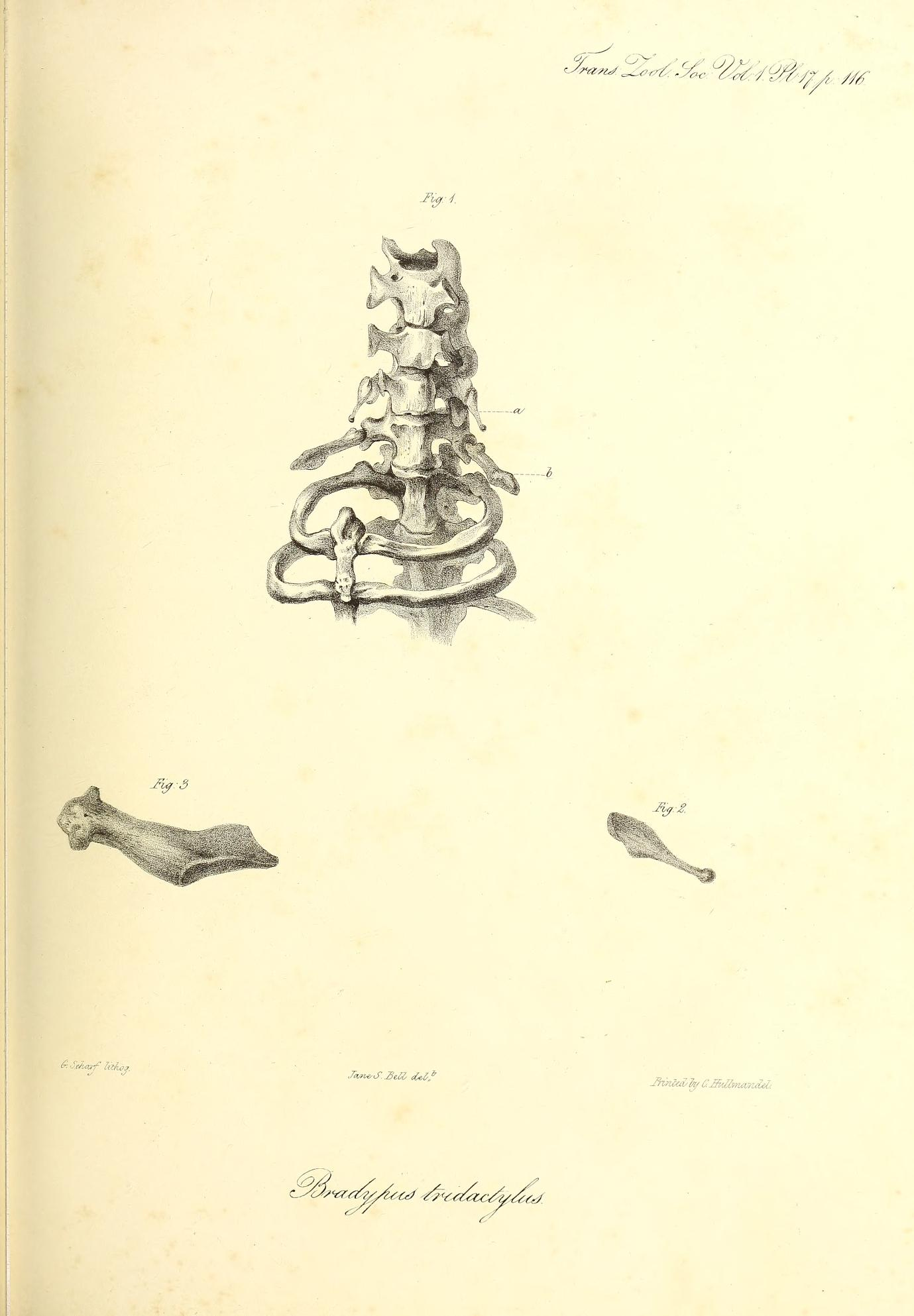
Vol 1 Plate 17 of Transactions of the Zoological Society of London by Jane S. Bell

== Personal life ==
Bell was born to William Robert of Ruabon, Denbighshire, Wales. Bell married Thomas Bell at St Mary's Church, Rotherhithe on 3 December 1832. The couple had one child, a daughter, Susan Gosse, born 29 March 1836. Susan pre-deceased her parents on 4 January 1854. In 1861/2 Thomas and Jane retired to The Wakes, a house in Selborne, Hampshire, former home of the amateur naturalist Gilbert White. Jane died on 29 June 1873, followed by Thomas in 1880. She is buried at the Church of St. Mary, a historic church in Selborne.

A few of Thomas Bell's works were illustrated by Jane, who signed herself Jane S. Bell.

== Works ==
- A Monograph of the Testudinata. 1832–1836. Summarizes all the world's turtles, living and extinct. The book was authored by her husband, Thomas Bell, and the forty plates are by Jane S. Bell, James De Carle Sowerby and Edward Lear.
- Bell, Thomas (1834). "XII. Observations on the Neck of the Three-toed Sloth, Bradypus tridactylus, Linn". The Transactions of the Zoological Society of London. 1 (2): 113–116. Plates by Jane S. Bell
