= Thomas Bell (zoologist) =

English zoologist, surgeon and writer

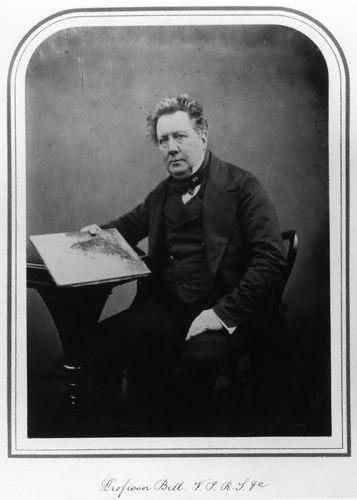
- Born: 11 October 1792; Poole, England
- Died: 13 March 1880 (aged 87); Selborne, England
- Known for: British Stalke-eyed Crustacea
- Spouse: Jane Roberts (scientific illustrator)
- Children: 1
- Relatives: Philip Henry Gosse (cousin)
- Scientific career
- Workplaces: King's College London, Guy's Hospital, London
- Author abbrev. (zoology): Bell

Thomas Hornsey Bell FRS FLS (11 October 1792 – 13 March 1880) was an English zoologist, dental surgeon and writer, born in Poole, Dorset, England. He was a professor of zoology at King's College from 1836.

== Career ==
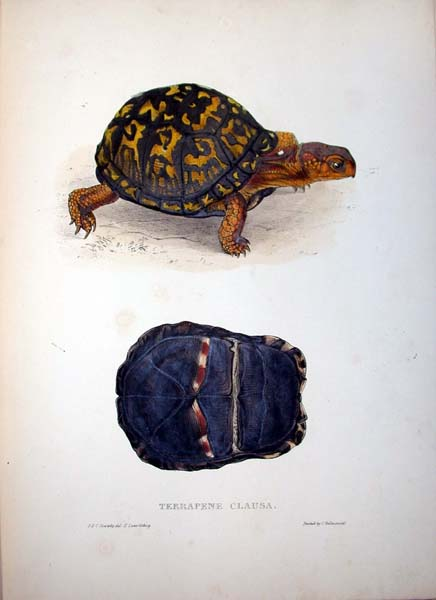
Terrapene clausa from Thomas Bell's "A Monograph of the Testudinata" London: 1832–1836

Bell, like his mother Susan, took a keen interest in natural history which his mother also encouraged in his younger cousin Philip Henry Gosse. Bell left Poole in 1813 for his training as a dental surgeon in Guy's and St. Thomas's Hospitals, London. He is listed in 1817 as having an address at number 17 Fenchurch Street, and as being a committee member of the newly formed London Peace Society. By 1819 his address is given as 18 Bucklersbury, also in the city of London. He combined two careers, becoming Professor of Zoology at King's College London in 1836 (on the strength of amateur research) and lecturing on anatomy at Guy's Hospital. He became a fellow of the Royal College of Surgeons in 1844. He was the first president of the Ray Society, founded the same year, and President of the Linnean Society in 1858. He was elected to the Royal Society in 1828 and served as a secretary to the Royal Society between 1848 and 1853.

Bell was at the heart of the scientific establishment and when Charles Darwin returned to London from the Beagle expedition on 2 December 1836, Bell was quick to take on the task of describing the reptile specimens. He was also entrusted with the specimens of Crustacea collected on the voyage. He was the authority in this field; his book British Stalke-eyed Crustacea is a masterwork. He played a significant part in the inception of Darwin's theory of natural selection in March 1837 when he confirmed that the giant Galápagos tortoises were native to the islands, not brought in by buccaneers for food as Darwin had thought. He supported the arrangements for publication of Zoology of the Voyage of H.M.S. Beagle, but then was very slow to make progress on the work, and though the first parts of work were published in 1838, Bell's contribution on reptiles (Part 5) was published in two numbers, in 1842 and 1843, and he subsequently failed to take any action on the Crustacea.

As President of the Linnean Society, Bell chaired the meeting on 1 July 1858 at which Darwin and Alfred Russel Wallace's theories on natural selection were first presented in a joint reading of their papers On the Tendency of Species to form Varieties; and on the Perpetuation of Varieties and Species by Natural Means of Selection. Bell appears to have been unimpressed, and in his annual presidential report presented in May 1859 wrote that "The year which has passed has not, indeed, been marked by any of those striking discoveries which at once revolutionize, so to speak, the department of science on which they bear".

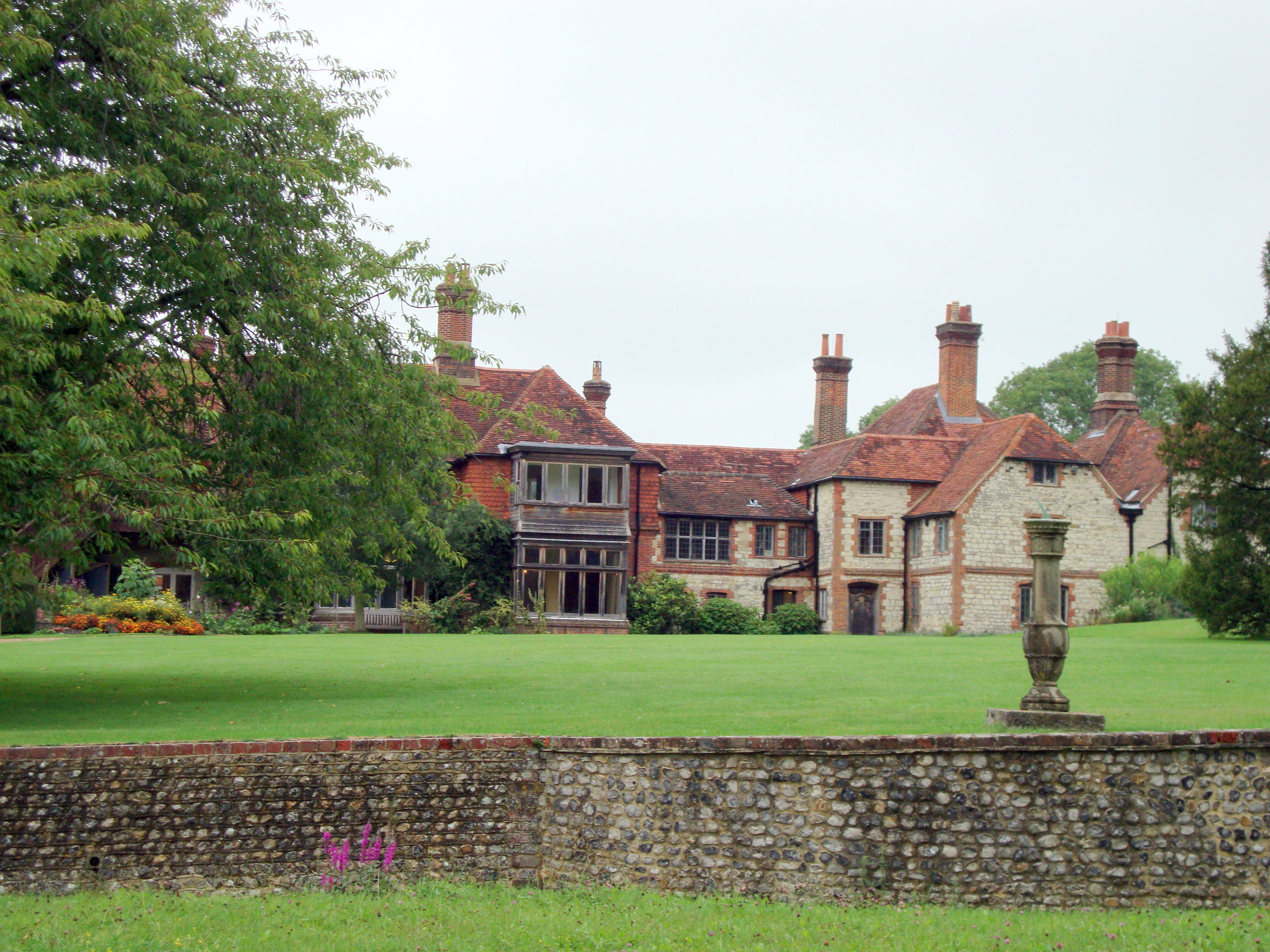
Gilbert White's house, The Wakes, now a museum, viewed from the back gardens in 2010

In his seventieth year Bell retired to The Wakes, bought from the descendants of Gilbert White at Selborne. He collected White memorabilia and studied the flora and fauna around the home. In 1877, aged eighty-five, he published a new edition of White's book The Natural History of Selborne. Bell died at Selborne in 1880.

== Personal life ==
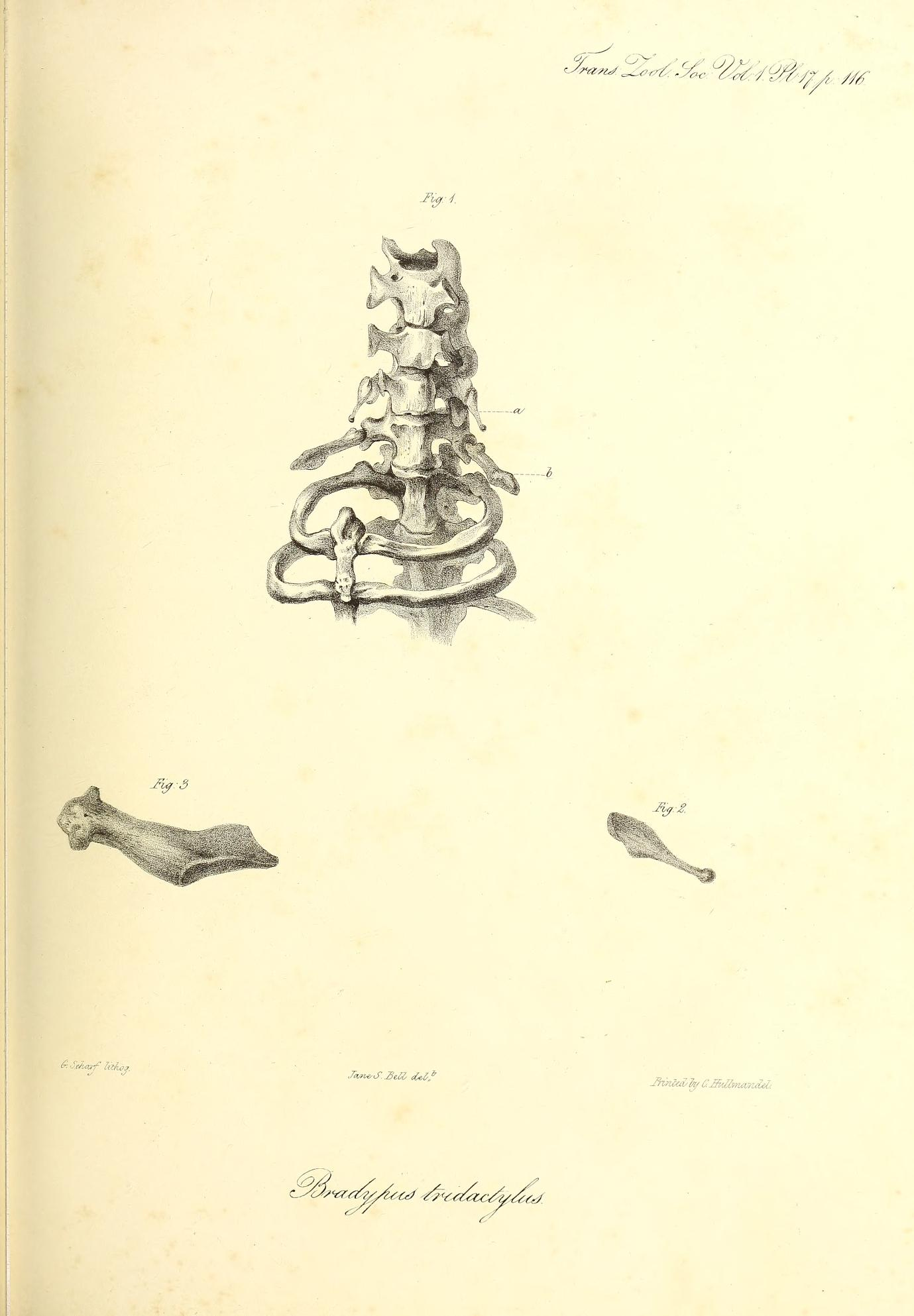
Illustration (Plate 17) for one of Bell's articles "Observations on the Neck of the Three-toed Sloth, Bradypus tridactylus, Linn.", by Jane S. Bell

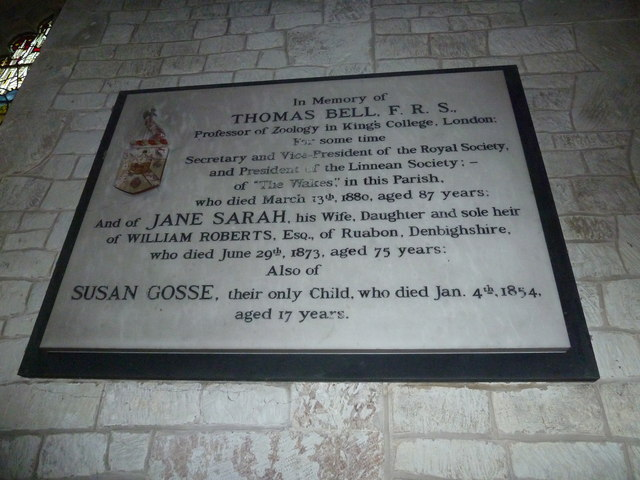
Memorial plaque in St Mary's Selborne

Bell married Jane Sarah, daughter of William Roberts, Esq., at St Mary's Church, Rotherhithe, on 3 December 1832. The couple had one child, a daughter, Susan Gosse, born 29 March 1836. Susan pre-deceased her parents on 4 January 1854. Jane died on 29 June 1873.

A few of Bell's works were illustrated by Jane, who signed herself Jane S. Bell.

== Legacy ==
Bell is commemorated in the scientific names of several species and subspecies of reptiles.

- Chrysemys picta belli, a subspecies of turtle
- Gonocephalus bellii, a species of lizard
- Kinixys belliana, a species of tortoise
- Leiolepis belliana, a species of lizard
- Leiosaurus bellii, a species of lizard
- Liolaemus bellii, a species of lizard
- Myuchelys bellii, a species of turtle
- Plestiodon lynxe bellii, a subspecies of lizard

== Works ==
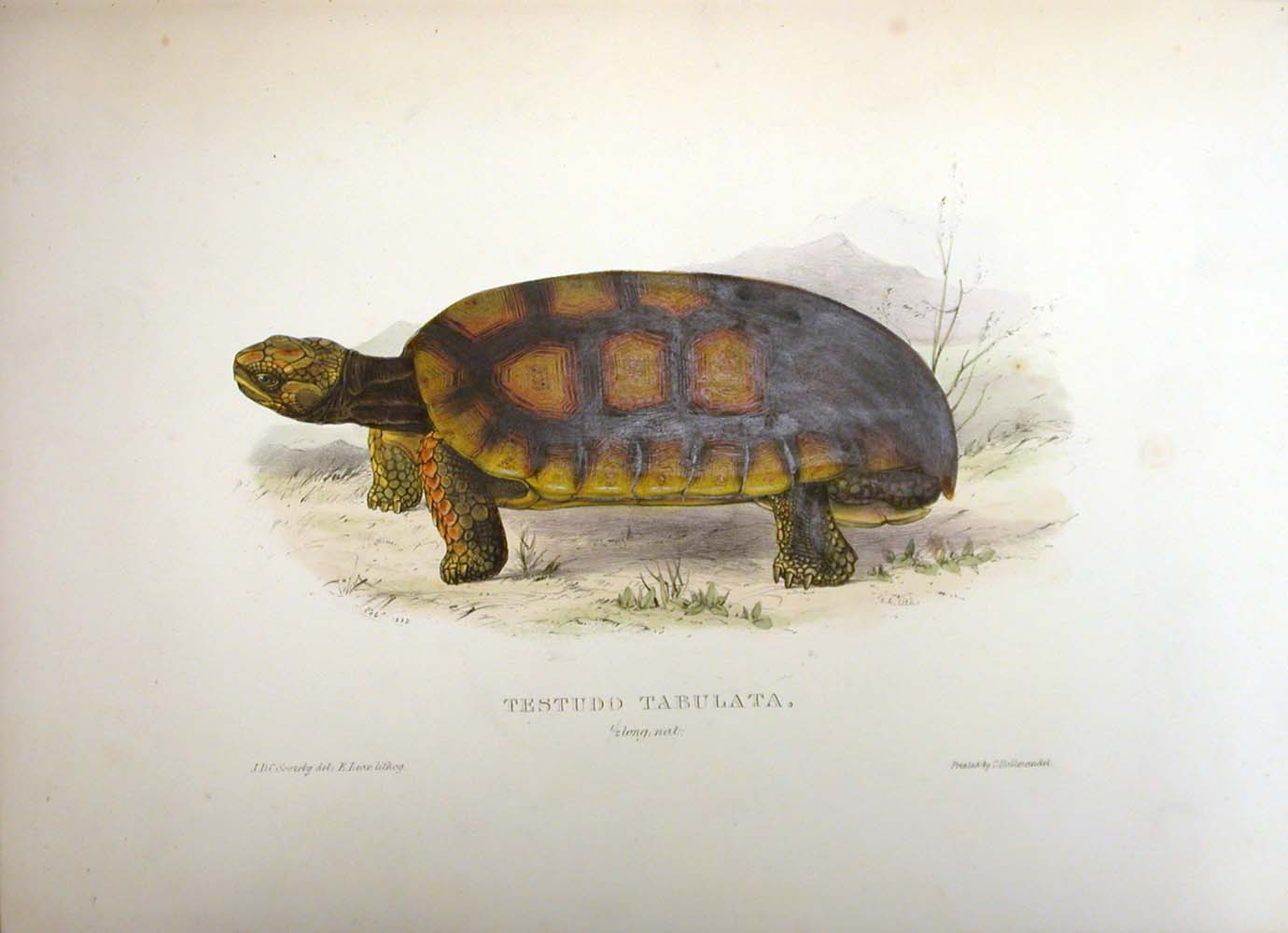
Chelonoidis denticulata/Testudo tabulata from Thomas Bell's A Monograph of the Testudinata London: 1832–1836

- A Monograph of the Testudinata. 1832–1836. – summarizes all the world's turtles, living and extinct. The forty plates are by Jane S. Bell, James de Carle Sowerby and Edward Lear.
- A History of British Quadrupeds. 1836.
- A History of the British Stalk-eyed Crustacea. Paternoster Row, London: John Van Voorst. 1844–1853.

== See also ==
- Category:Taxa named by Thomas Bell (zoologist)
